= Northville, Connecticut =

Rural community in New Milford, Connecticut, United States

- Unincorporated village
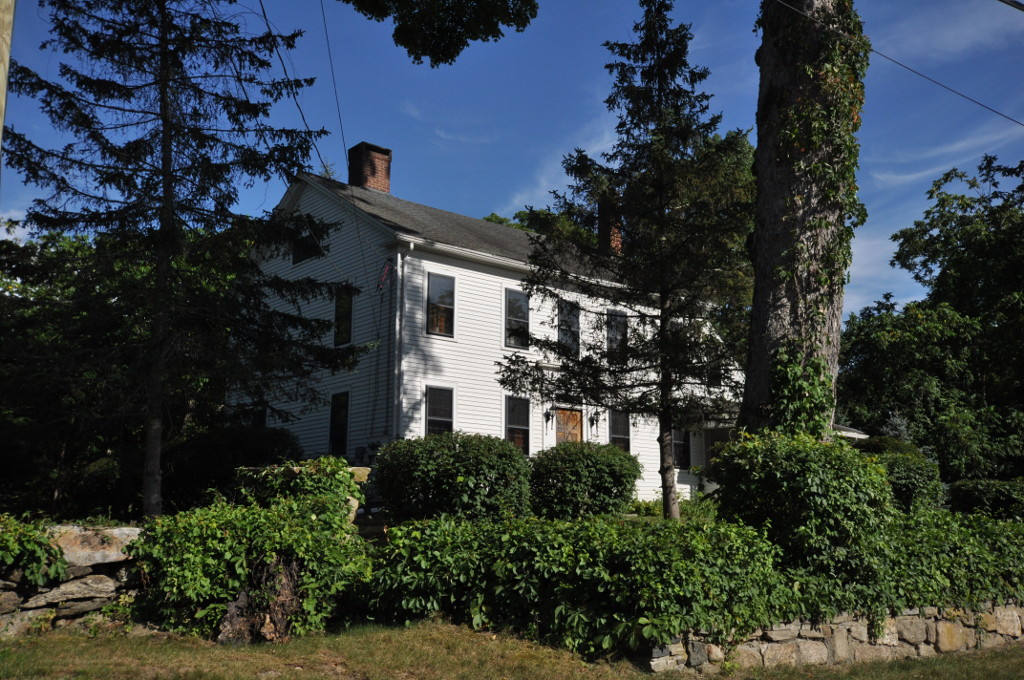

- Location in Connecticut Location in the United States
- Coordinates: 41°37′45.34″N 73°23′35.43″W
- Country: United States
- U.S. state: Connecticut
- Town: New Milford
- County: Litchfield

Northville is an unincorporated area in the town of New Milford, Litchfield County, Connecticut, United States. It is located approximately 4 miles (6.4 km) northeast of New Milford Town Center along U.S. Route 202.

== History ==
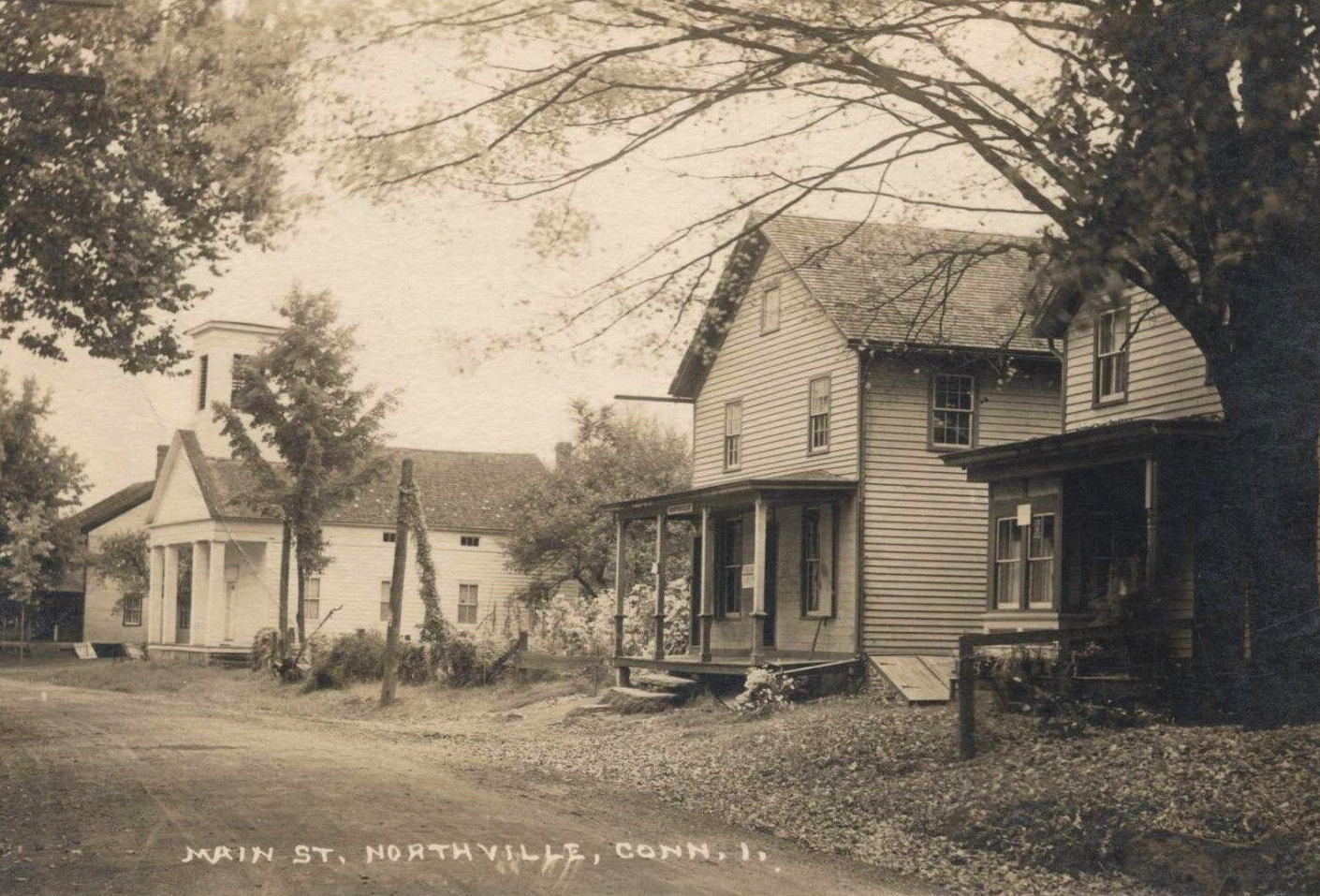
Northville Center in 1920

Northville was settled in the 1750s, after Daniel Hine established a farm here, while still residing in the village center. It was only in 1760 that Hine built a farmhouse on the land. By 1773, Abel Buckingham would begin farming on the adjacent lot and thus, a farming community began. The combined property is now known as Hine-Buckingham Farms or Hunt Hill Farm. It is listed on the National Register of Historic Places.

The Buckingham family would remain a significant presence in the Northville community for years to come. Many were farmers but some members of the family would fulfill other key roles in the community.

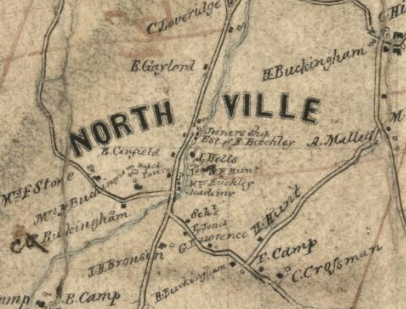
Snippet of Northville from 1850s New Milford Map

=== Store and Post Office ===
Sheldon Buckingham opened the original Northville store out of his home around 1816. This would also be the location of the Nothville post office, of which he was postmaster for thirteen years. After selling the store, the building became a tavern. The store & post office was moved to a building on the other side (north) of the meetinghouse. The post office would eventually be discontinued however, the store would remain in operation for the better part of the next century. This would be until it was destroyed by fire in 1983, under the ownership of Joel Brenner. His mother perished as a result of the fire. Today, the property is occupied by the current Northville Market and Northville Liquors.

=== Northville Church ===
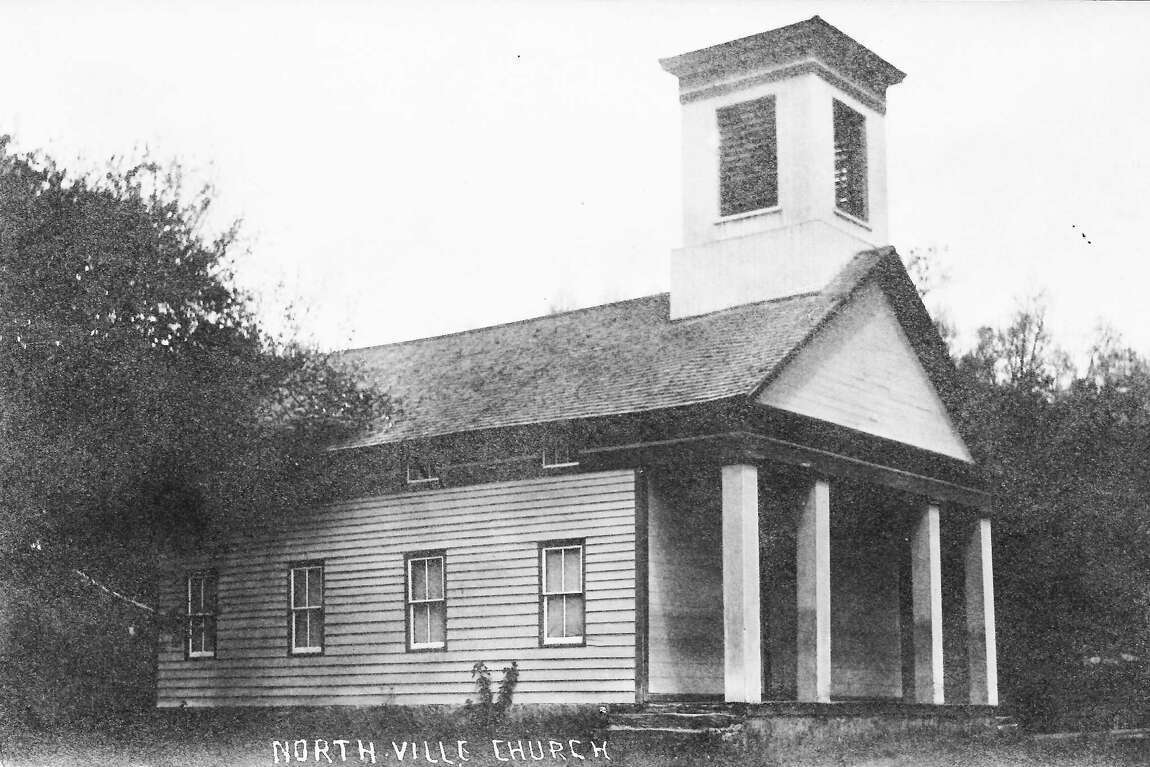
Northville Baptist Meetinghouse

The Northville Baptist Church was established in 1814. The meetinghouse, built in 1821, became known as the "East Meetinghouse", while the church in neighboring Merryall was called "West Meetinghouse".

For decades the Church was a central fixture of the community. That was until the congregation decided to move off the main route to a nearby side road in 1956. The original meetinghouse was also moved, but not to the new location of the church. Rather, it was moved to a hilltop across the road (south corner of Route 202 and Buckingham Rd). The building still stands today, and for a time, it served as the headquarters for the New Milford Knights of Columbus Council No. 40.

=== Northville School ===
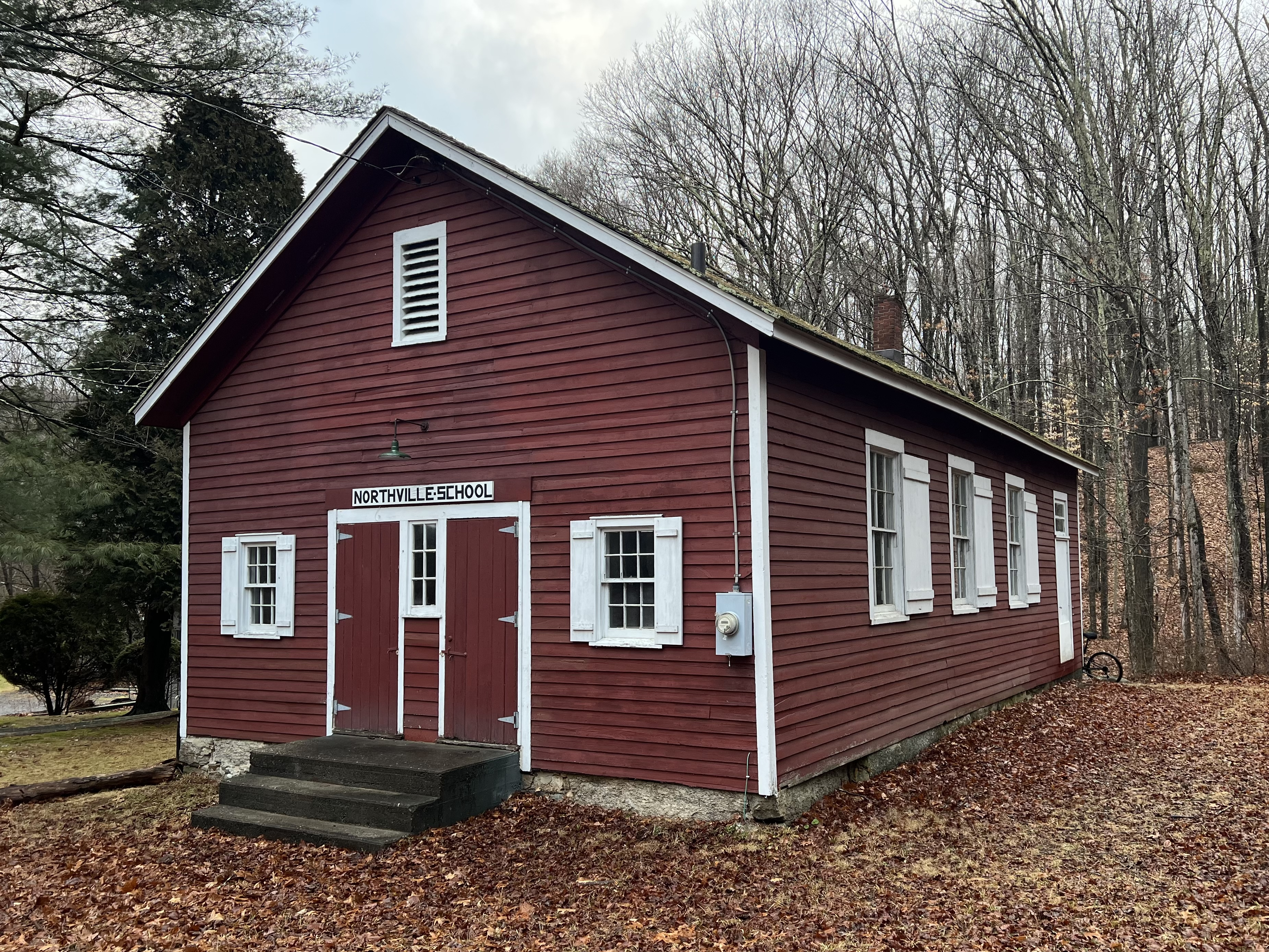
Northville Schoolhouse

In 1862 land was purchased for the school to be built. It would be used to educate students until the mid-twentieth century, when New Milford began a consolidation effort, phasing out the one-room schoolhouses. By the 1950s Northville students began attending school in the town center. The building was then used by the Northville Fire Dept. as a storage space for many years.

Today, Northville School is one of three surviving schoolhouses in New Milford. Now owned by the Town of New Milford, the Northville Schoolhouse Committee oversees its maintenance and use.

Northville would be without an educational institution until September 1972, when Schaghticoke Middle School would open its doors. Ten years later Northville Elementary School would open.

== Parks and recreation ==
- Baldwin Park
- Pratt Nature Center
- Carlson's Grove Park
- Chappuis Park
