= New Milford, Connecticut =

New Milford, Connecticut Weantinock
- Town
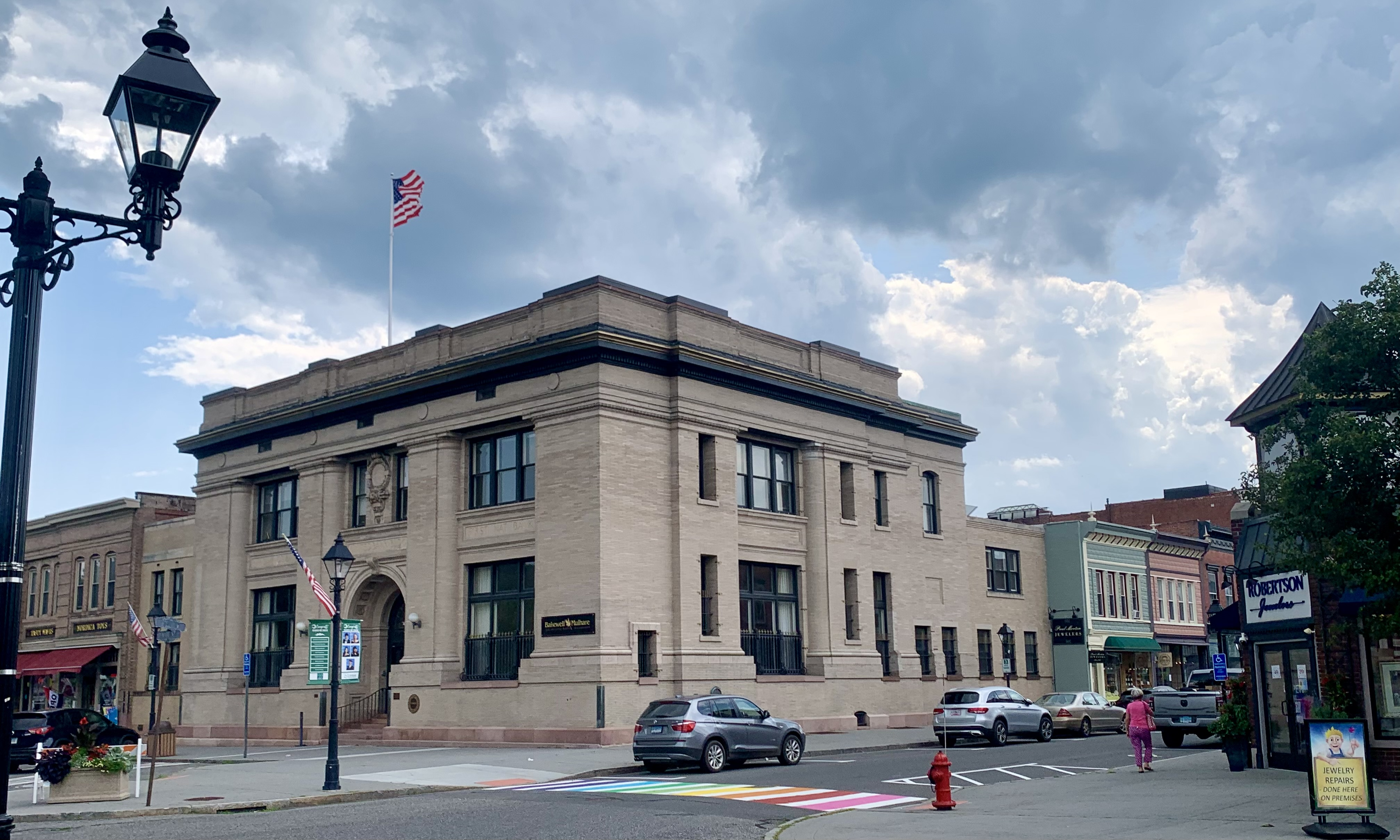
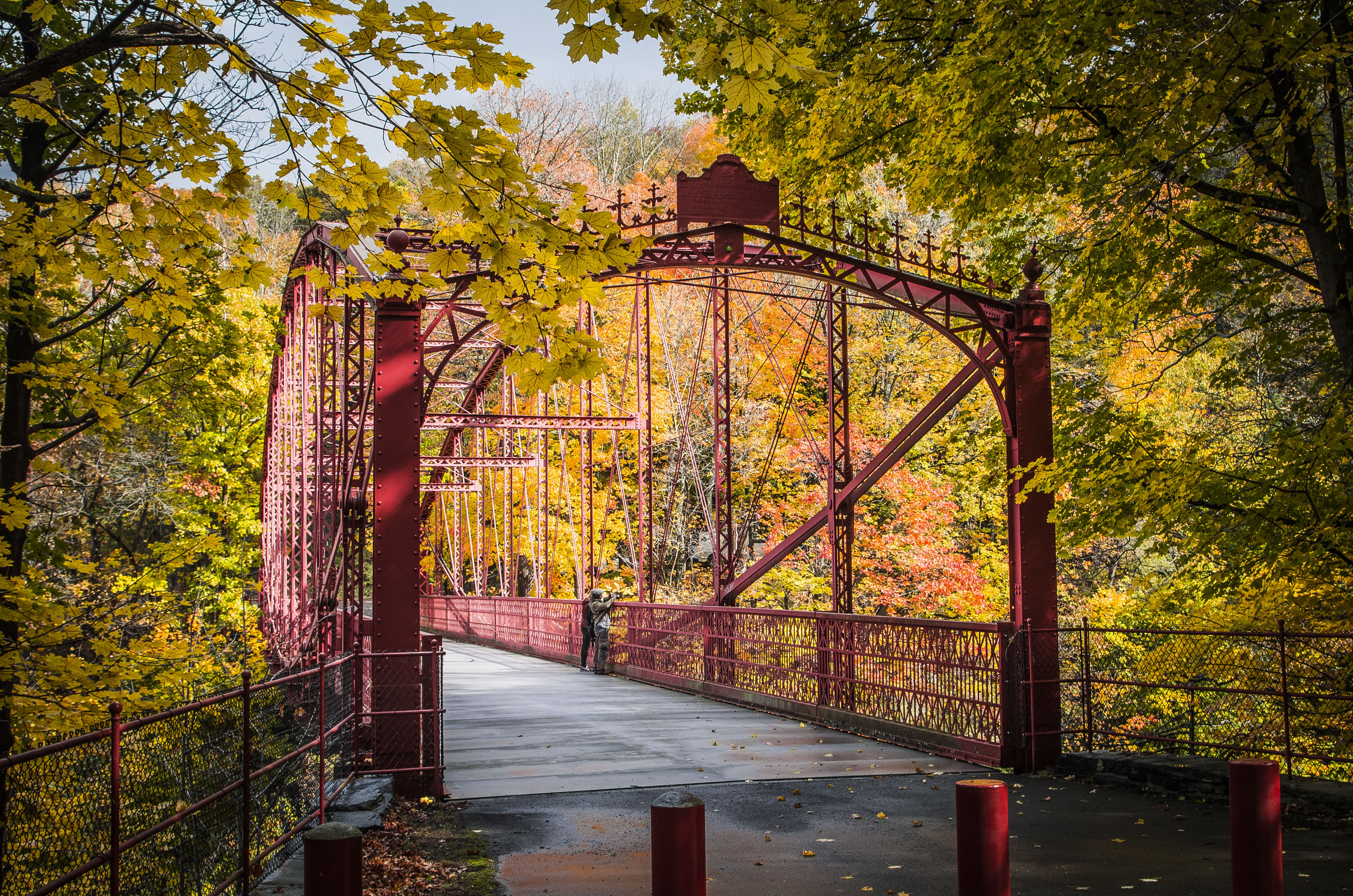
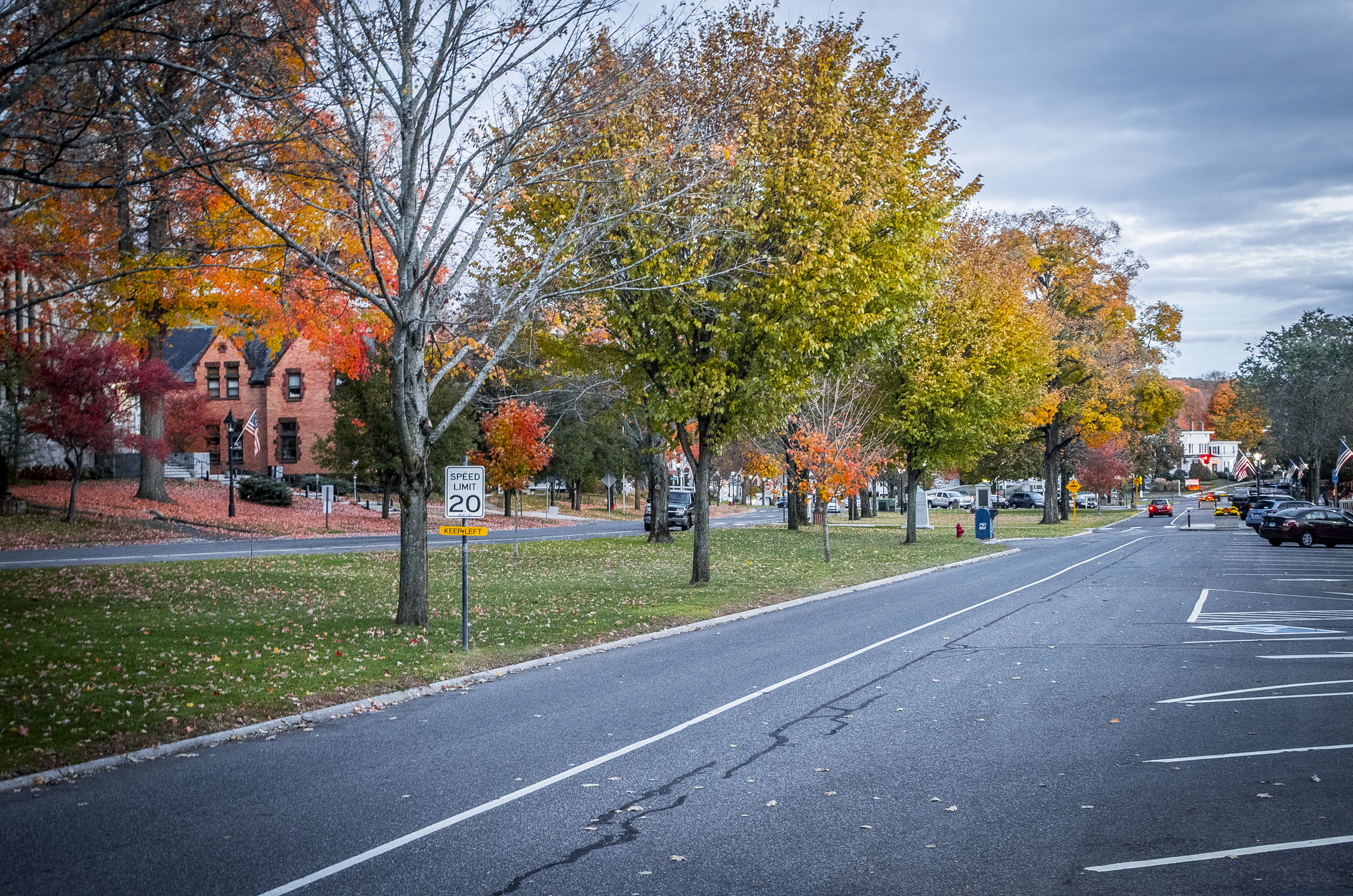
- United Bank Building Lover's Leap Bridge Town Green

- Flag Seal
- Motto: "Gateway to Litchfield County"
- Coordinates: 41°34′37″N 73°24′30″W
- Country: United States
- U.S. state: Connecticut
- County: Litchfield
- Region: Western CT
- Settled: 1707
- Incorporated: 1712

Government
  - Type: Mayor-council
  - Mayor: Pete Bass
  - Town Council: 9 members: Chris Cosgrove (R); Tom Esposito (R); Katy Francis (R); Mary Jane Lundgren (D); Paul Murphy (R); Robert Gambino (D); Sal Rynkiewicz (R); Doug Skelly (R); Alexandra Thomas (D)

Area
  - Total: 63.7 sq mi (165.0 km^{2})
  - Land: 61.6 sq mi (159.5 km^{2})
  - Water: 2.1 sq mi (5.5 km^{2})
- Elevation: 236 ft (72 m)

Population (2024)
  - Total: 28,334
  - Density: 457/sq mi (176.3/km^{2})
- Time zone: UTC-5 (Eastern)
  - Summer (DST): UTC-4 (Eastern)
- ZIP Codes: 06755, 06776
- Area codes: 860/959
- FIPS code: 09-52630
- GNIS feature ID: 209242
- Website: www.newmilford.org

New Milford is a town in Litchfield County, Connecticut, United States. The town, part of Greater Danbury, as well as the New York Metropolitan Area, has a population of 28,115 as of the 2020 census. New Milford is located within the Western Connecticut Planning Region.

New Milford is located roughly 50 miles (80 km) west of Hartford, 63 miles (101 km) northeast of New York City proper, and 80 miles from Midtown Manhattan.

New Milford lies 14 miles (23 km) north of Danbury on the banks of the Housatonic River, and shares its border with the northeastern shore of Candlewood Lake. It is the largest town in the state of Connecticut in terms of land area at nearly 63.7 mi^{2} (164.9822 km^{2}). The town center is listed as a census-designated place (CDP).

New Milford consists of a number of town sub-divisions (i.e. boroughs, districts, communities, or neighborhoods), including Chimney Point, Gaylordsville, Merryall, and Northville. The town's infrastructure largely branches off from either side of the highway routes U.S. 7 and U.S. 202, which intersect and split within the town and together form its main thoroughfare.

The area constituting contemporary New Milford was originally inhabited by the indigenous Wawyachtonoc people, while the town of New Milford itself was formally established by English colonists in the early 18th century.

== History ==
=== Native Americans ===
The indigenous Wawyachtonoc people, an Algonquian-speaking sub-group of the Golden Hill branch of the Paugusset Nation, and later a Mahican-affiliated Native American tribe, are the earliest known inhabitants of the area constituting contemporary New Milford, having resided there both before and during the colonial era. They had a farming and fishing culture, cultivating corn—mainly by the Housatonic River and its local tributary, the Still River—squash, beans, and tobacco; and fishing in freshwater areas.

=== Colonial times ===
In 1707 John Noble Sr., previously of Westfield, Massachusetts, and his eight-year-old daughter Sarah Noble were the first Anglo-American settlers. (A public school was later named after Sarah Noble.) They were soon joined by others who had bought land there.

On October 17, 1711, twelve families (with a total of about 70 people) petitioned the Connecticut General Assembly to create the town, together with the associated privilege of levying a tax to support a minister. With the legislature's approval the town was organized the next year. The residents soon secured Daniel Boardman to preach, and he was ordained as the minister of the Congregational Church on November 21, 1716.

In 1722 most of northwestern Connecticut (except for the town of Litchfield) was placed under the jurisdiction of New Haven County. In 1730 the eastern half of northwestern Connecticut was transferred to the jurisdiction of Hartford County. However, New Milford, Salisbury, and Sharon remained in New Haven County until the formation of Litchfield County in 1751.

=== American Revolution ===
Roger Sherman lived in New Milford before moving to New Haven in 1761. He later became a member of the Continental Congress and signed both the Declaration of Independence and U.S. Constitution. The lot of his former house is the site of the present Town Hall.

During the American Revolution the 7th Connecticut Regiment (also known as the 19th Continental Regiment) was raised in town on September 16, 1776. The regiment, and the New Milford men in it, would see action in the Battle of Brandywine, Battle of Germantown, and the Battle of Monmouth. In total the town "sent 285 men to fight in the War out of a total population of 2,776."

=== The Boardman family ===
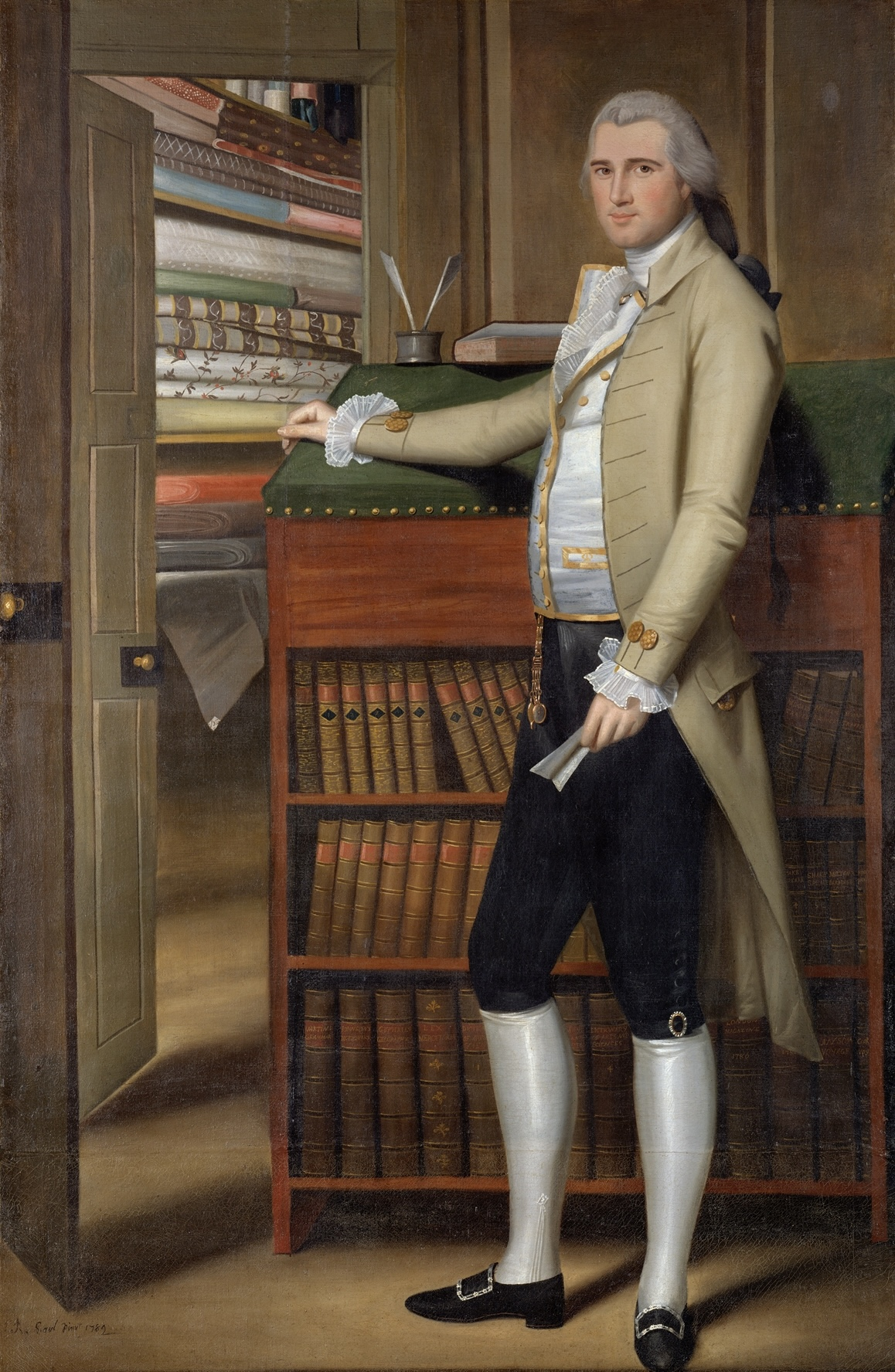
Elijah Boardman, by Ralph Earl c. 1789

- David Sherman Boardman (1768–1864) was the youngest child of Deacon Sherman and Sarah (Bostwick) Boardman. He became a lawyer in town and later chief judge in Litchfield County Court. He served as judge of probate for the district of New Milford in 1805, and held the place by successive annual appointments for sixteen years. He was elected Representative to the General Assembly eight times.
- Elijah Boardman (1760–1823) was a U.S. senator representing Connecticut. Born in New Milford, he was educated by private tutors, and served in the Revolutionary War.
- William Whiting Boardman (1794–1871), a U.S. Representative born in town, was the son of Elijah Boardman. He was a Connecticut state senator in the fourth district, 1830–32, a member of the Connecticut State House of Representatives, 1836–1839, 1845, and 1849–1851; Speaker of the Connecticut State House of Representatives, 1836, 1839, and 1845; US Representative from Connecticut's second district, 1840–1843. He died in New Haven, and is interred at Grove Street Cemetery in New Milford.

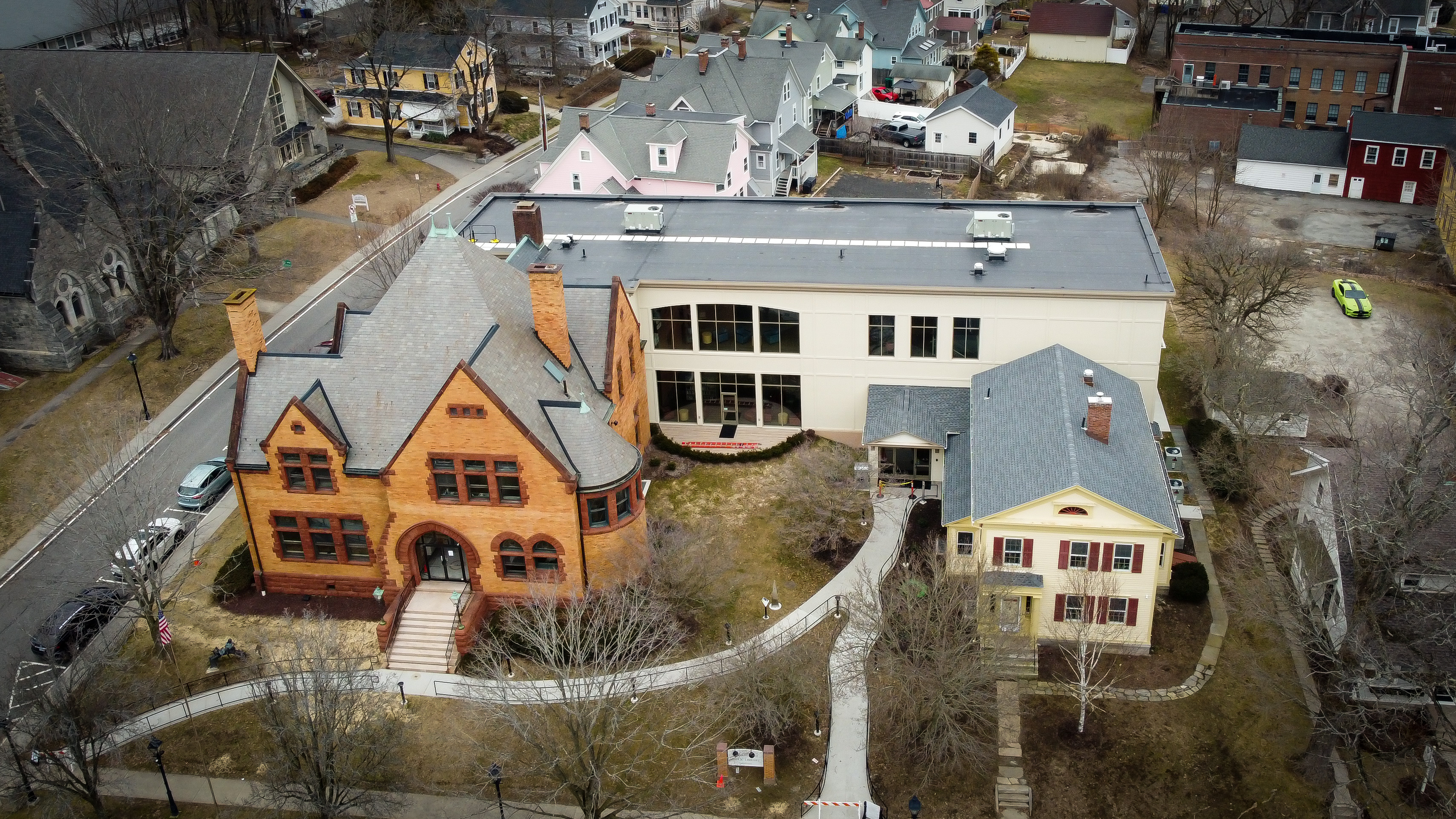
Town Library, 2023

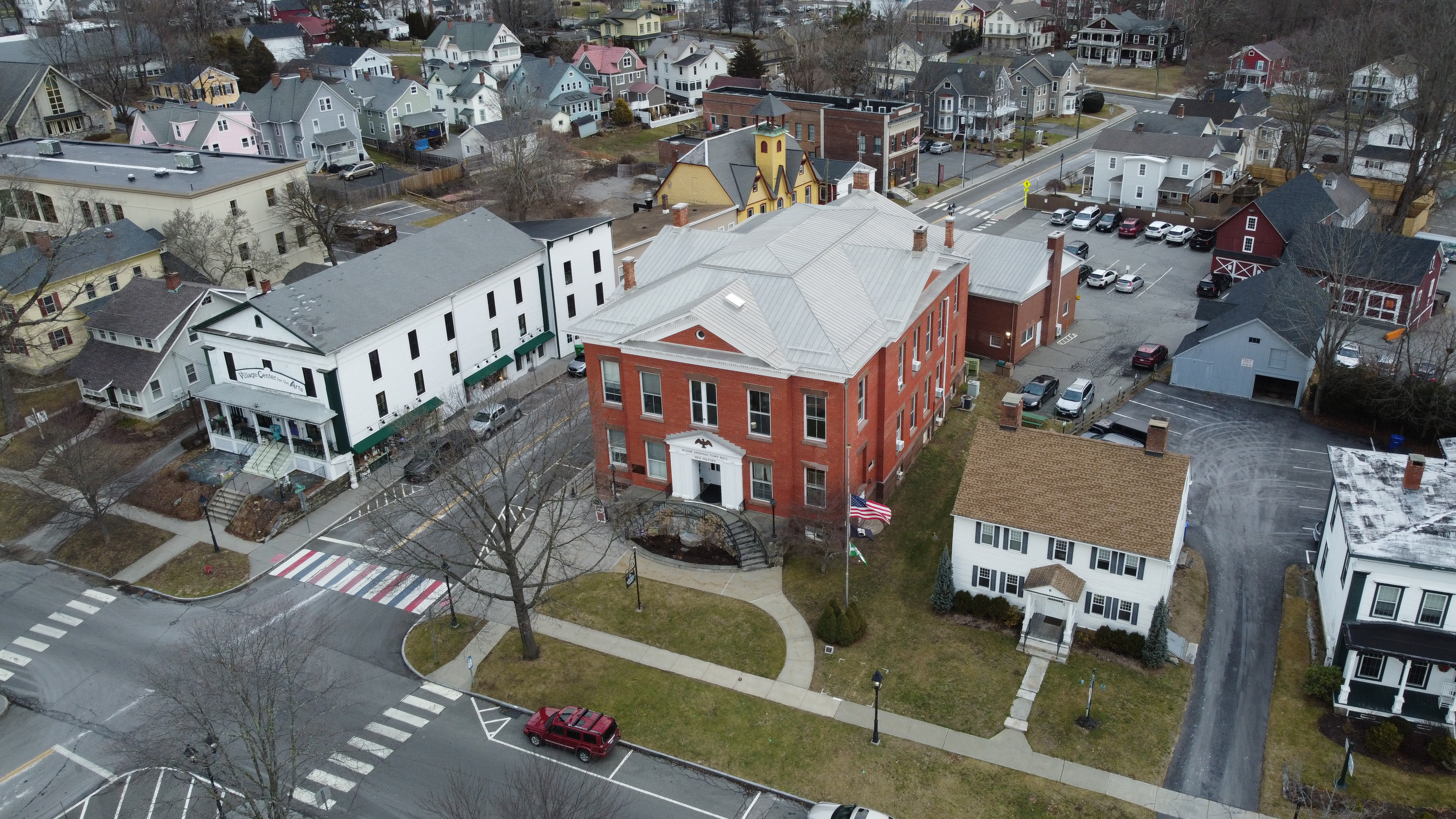
Town Hall, 2023

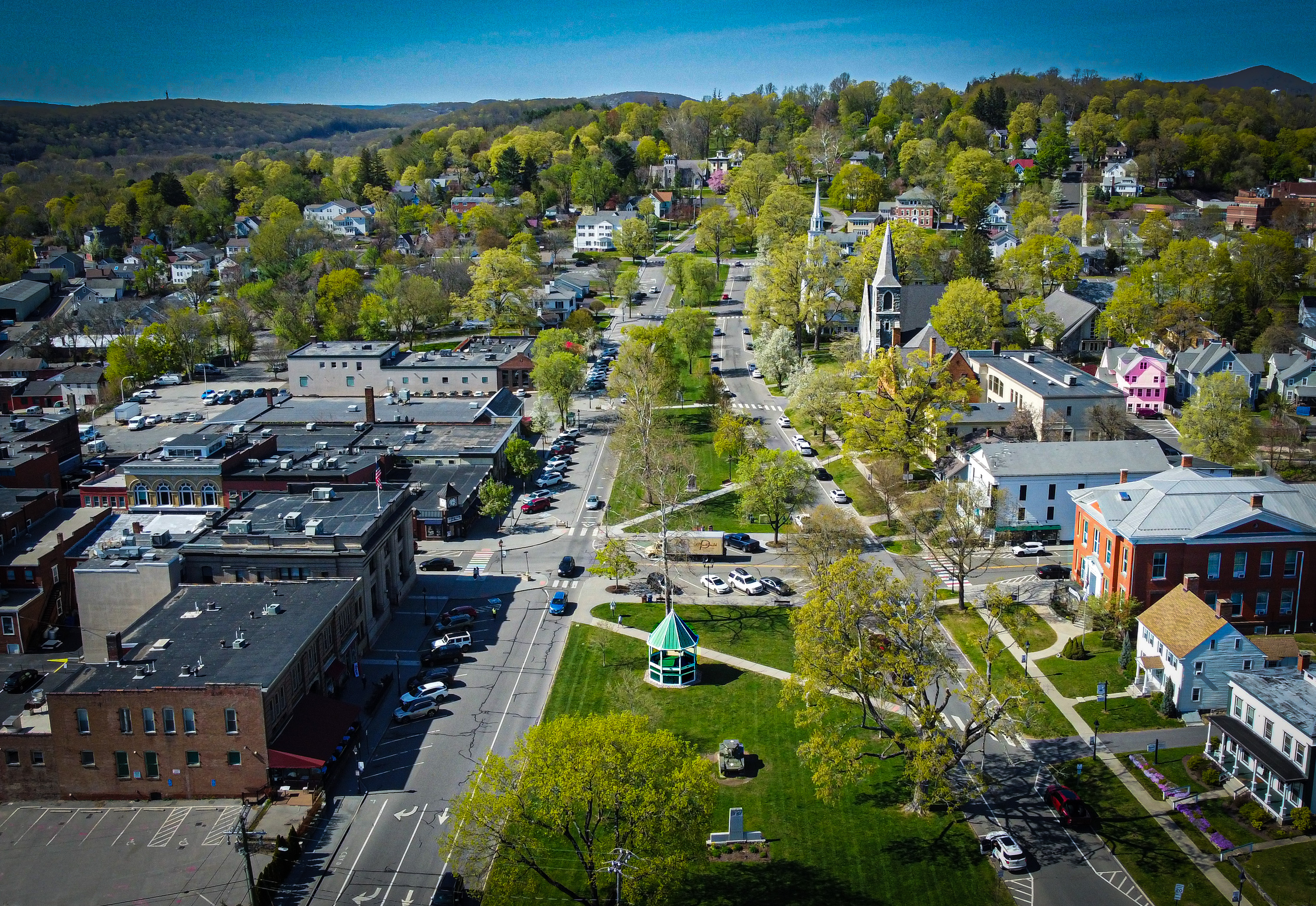
The Town Green, 2023

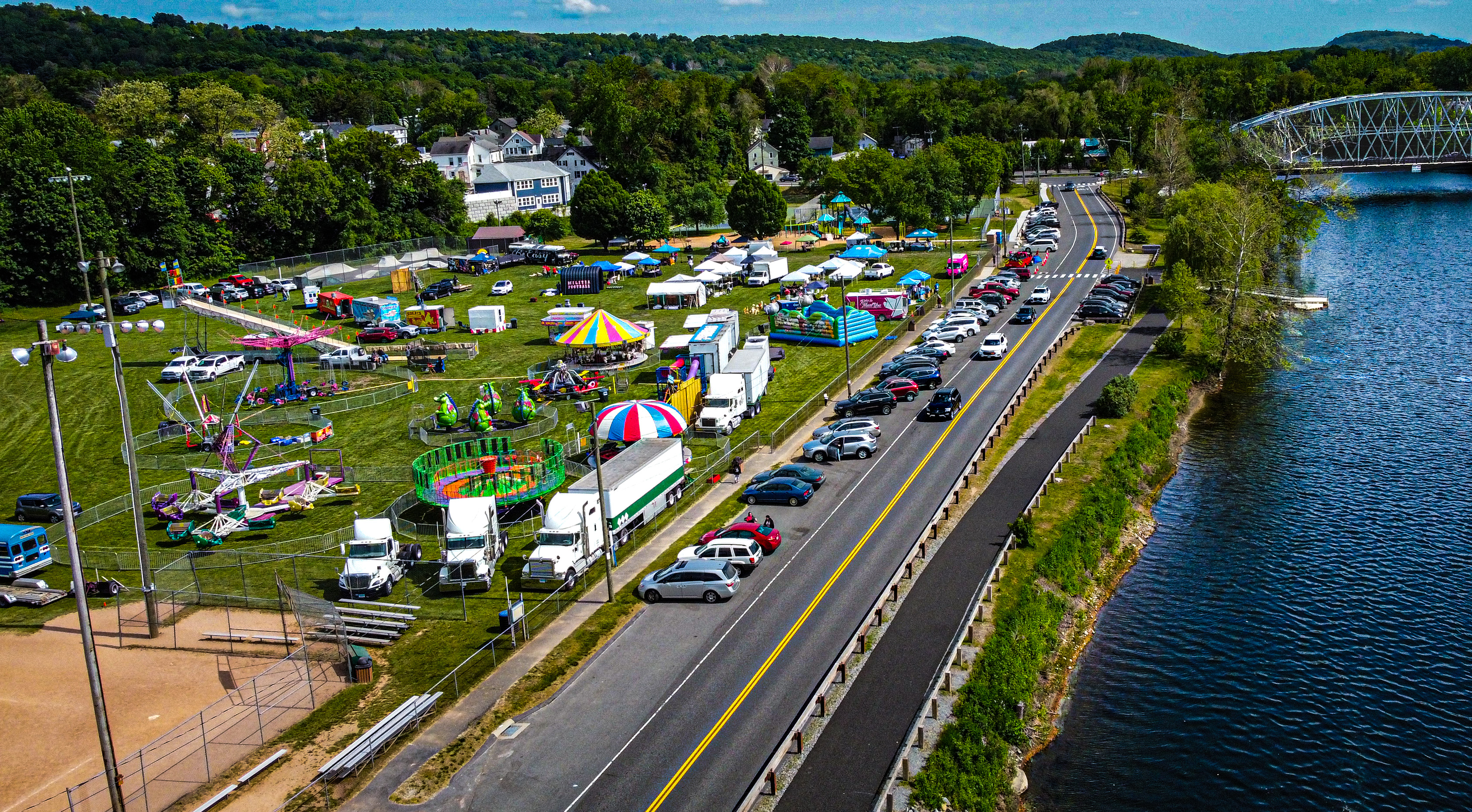
New Milford G.O.A.T. Days, 2023

=== 19th and 20th centuries ===
During the early- to mid-19th century, New Milford was home to several locations that were part of the Underground Railroad network.

In the second half of the 19th century, many new industries came to town. The Water Witch Hose Company No. 2, local telephone and electricity companies, and newspapers were all founded. Factories in town made buttons, paint and varnish, hats, furniture, pottery, lime, dairy products and pasteboard, among other goods. Tobacco became the major crop in the area, and tobacco warehouses sprang up to handle its storage and processing before sales.

In 1942 Buck's Rock Camp was founded off Bucks Rock Road, and has remained in operation ever since.

The house that inspired the 1946 novel and 1948 film, Mr. Blandings Builds His Dream House, still stands in the Merryall section of town.

=== 21st century ===
The town has constructed a 1,000,000-gallon sewer plant expansion on West Street and a sewer pump station on Boardman Road. It has also reconstructed the Route 67/Grove Street Intersection and built an ambulance facility on Scovill Street.

The town added a skate park at Young's Field (2006), reconstructed the tennis and basketball courts at Young's Field (2010), reconstructed the basketball court at Williamson Park in Gaylordsville (2010), and improved Lynn Deming Park (2017), and is working on the New Milford River Trail, which will eventually join the existing 1.5-mile Sega Meadows Park trail (2012), 3.5 miles of River Road, and the 0.25-mile Young's Field River Trail (2017) and link them to the greenways in the neighboring towns of Brookfield and Kent. Several streetscape projects were completed by the Department of Public Works (DPW) with grant money on Church Street, Whittlesey Avenue, and the west side of East Street (2009/2010). Candlewoof Dog Park is completed on Pickett District Road. A bocce ball court was constructed at the Senior Center by Boy Scout Troop 66 (2012).

New Milford is frequented on weekends between the months of April and December, when visitors attend the Elephant's Trunk Flea Market, a large outdoor flea market located near the southern end of the town which WRKI has claimed is the largest weekly flea market in New England. Not only is it a popular destination with summer and weekend residents from NYC and its suburbs, but also for those looking to tour a town similar to Stars Hollow in the television series Gilmore Girls. Communities on Candlewood Lake's northeast corner and the rural and rolling farm land in the northern portion of the town between Routes 7 and 202 swell with additional visitors between May and October.

The trend of town population growth has continued but slowed since the beginning of the 21st century.

=== National Register of Historic Places sites ===
- Boardman's Bridge – Boardman Road at Housatonic River, northwest of New Milford (added June 13, 1976)
- Carl F. Schoverling Tobacco Warehouse – 1 Wellsville Avenue (added May 12, 1982)
- E. A. Wildman & Co. Tobacco Warehouse – 34 Bridge Street (added November 20, 1988)
- Hine-Buckingham Farms – 44, 46, and 48 Upland Road, 78, 81 Crossman Road (added June 7, 2004)
- Housatonic Railroad Station – Railroad Street (added April 1, 1984)
- J. S. Halpine Tobacco Warehouse – West and Mill Streets (added 1982)
- John Glover Noble House (added September 29, 1977)
- Lover's Leap Bridge – south of New Milford on Pumpkin Hill Road (added June 13, 1976)
- Merritt Beach & Son Building – 30 Bridge Street (added May 28, 1992)
- Merryall Union Evangelical Society Chapel – Chapel Hill Road (added July 5, 1986)
- New Milford Center Historic District – Bennitt and Elm Streets, Center Cemetery, East, South Main, Mill, and Railroad Streets (added July 13, 1986)
- United Bank Building – 19-21 Main Street (added May 12, 1982)

== Geography ==
New Milford is located on the northeastern shore of Candlewood Lake. The East Aspetuck River, Still River, and Housatonic River flow through the town. Downtown New Milford is home to a large town green, commonly cited as the longest town green in the state of Connecticut.

According to the United States Census Bureau, the town has a total area of 63.7 square miles (165.1 km^{2}), making it the largest town in Connecticut. Ranking behind New Milford is Greenwich with 47.62 square miles. 61.6 square miles (159.5 km^{2}) of New Milford is land, and 2.2 square miles (5.6 km^{2}) of New Milford (3.40%) is water. The census-designated place (or CDP) corresponding to the town center has a total area of 3.4 square miles (8.8 km^{2}), of which 3.4 square miles (8.8 km^{2}) is land and 0.04 square miles (0.10 km^{2}) (0.88%) is water.

=== Greater New Milford Area ===
The Greater New Milford Area, also known as Southern Litchfield County, encompasses a cluster of towns nestled in the Connecticut landscape. This region includes Bridgewater, Kent, New Milford, Roxbury, Sherman, Warren, and Washington. With a combined urban and town proper population of 43,732, the area is celebrated for its rich history, rural charm, and picturesque surroundings. Residents and visitors alike are drawn to the area's historic architecture, vibrant community life, and a harmonious blend of urban and rural living.

=== Principal Communities ===
- Gaylordsville (06755)
- Boardman Bridge
- Lower Merryall
- Merwinsville
- New Milford Center
- Northville
- Park Lane
- Still River
- Upper Merryall
- Lanesville
- Candlewood Hills
- Sunny Valley
- Pickett District
- Squash Hollow

=== Climate ===
New Milford has a humid continental climate, with mild-to-warm humid summers, cold-to-very-cold winters, and precipitation being relatively uniformly distributed throughout the year. The highest recorded temperature was 103 °F (39 °C) in July 1966, while the lowest recorded was −18 °F (−28 °C) in January 1968. Snowfall is generally frequent in winter.

Climate data for New Milford, Connecticut (Candlelight Farms Airport)
| Month | Jan | Feb | Mar | Apr | May | Jun | Jul | Aug | Sep | Oct | Nov | Dec | Year |
|---|---|---|---|---|---|---|---|---|---|---|---|---|---|
| Record high °F (°C) | 71 (22) | 77 (25) | 87 (31) | 95 (35) | 97 (36) | 100 (38) | 103 (39) | 102 (39) | 100 (38) | 92 (33) | 82 (28) | 76 (24) | 103 (39) |
| Mean daily maximum °F (°C) | 36 (2) | 40 (4) | 49 (9) | 61 (16) | 72 (22) | 80 (27) | 85 (29) | 83 (28) | 75 (24) | 63 (17) | 51 (11) | 40 (4) | 61 (16) |
| Mean daily minimum °F (°C) | 16 (−9) | 19 (−7) | 27 (−3) | 37 (3) | 48 (9) | 56 (13) | 62 (17) | 60 (16) | 53 (12) | 42 (6) | 32 (0) | 22 (−6) | 40 (4) |
| Record low °F (°C) | −18 (−28) | −14 (−26) | −8 (−22) | 14 (−10) | 26 (−3) | 36 (2) | 40 (4) | 38 (3) | 28 (−2) | 19 (−7) | 6 (−14) | −13 (−25) | −18 (−28) |
| Average precipitation inches (mm) | 3.76 (96) | 3.30 (84) | 4.43 (113) | 4.36 (111) | 4.57 (116) | 4.74 (120) | 4.99 (127) | 4.55 (116) | 4.66 (118) | 4.89 (124) | 4.54 (115) | 4.16 (106) | 52.95 (1,345) |

== Demographics ==
Historical population
| Year | Pop. | ±% |
|---|---|---|
| 1756 | 1,137 | — |
| 1774 | 2,776 | +144.2% |
| 1782 | 3,015 | +8.6% |
| 1790 | 3,167 | +5.0% |
| 1800 | 3,221 | +1.7% |
| 1810 | 3,537 | +9.8% |
| 1820 | 3,830 | +8.3% |
| 1850 | 4,508 | +17.7% |
| 1860 | 3,535 | −21.6% |
| 1870 | 3,586 | +1.4% |
| 1880 | 3,907 | +9.0% |
| 1890 | 3,917 | +0.3% |
| 1900 | 4,804 | +22.6% |
| 1910 | 5,010 | +4.3% |
| 1920 | 4,781 | −4.6% |
| 1930 | 4,700 | −1.7% |
| 1940 | 5,559 | +18.3% |
| 1950 | 5,799 | +4.3% |
| 1960 | 8,318 | +43.4% |
| 1970 | 14,601 | +75.5% |
| 1980 | 19,420 | +33.0% |
| 1990 | 23,629 | +21.7% |
| 2000 | 27,121 | +14.8% |
| 2010 | 28,142 | +3.8% |
| 2020 | 28,115 | −0.1% |
Population of Connecticut Towns 1756-1820

As of the census of 2020, there were 28,276 people, 10,775 households, and 7,503 families residing in the town. The population density was 443.8 inhabitants per square mile (171.4/km^{2}). There were 11,763 housing units at an average density of 190.4 per square mile (73.5/km^{2}). The racial makeup of the town was 81.6% White, 4.1% Black or African American, 0.1% Native American, 3.2% Asian, 0.00% Pacific Islander, 3.5% from other races, and 7.5% from two or more races. Hispanic or Latino of any race was 10.6% of the population.

Of the 10,618 households, 33.4% had children under the age of 18 living with them, 58.0% were married couples living together, 8.8% had a female householder with no husband present, and 29.3% were non-families. 23.0% of all households were made up of individuals, and 7.9% had someone living alone who was 65 years of age or older. The average household size was 2.62 and the average family size was 3.13.

In the town, the population had 24.30% under the age of 18, 6.87% from 18 to 24, 24.90% from 25 to 44, 31.75% from 45 to 64, and 12.18% who were 65 years of age or older. The median age was 41.4 years. For every 100 females, there were 97.4 males. For every 100 females age 18 and over, there were 93.6 males.

As of the 2000 Census the median income for a household in the town was $65,354, and the median income for a family was $75,775. Males had a median income of $50,523 versus $34,089 for females. The per capita income for the town was $29,630. About 2.1% of families and 3.3% of the population were below the poverty line, including 2.7% of those under age 18 and 5.5% of those age 65 or over.

Voter registration and party enrollment as of November 1, 2022
| Party | Active voters | Inactive voters | Total voters | Percentage |
|---|---|---|---|---|
| Democratic | 4,918 | 313 | 5,231 | 27.58% |
| Republican | 4,959 | 290 | 5,249 | 27.67% |
| Unaffiliated | 7,555 | 586 | 8,141 | 42.92% |
| Minor parties | 321 | 25 | 346 | 1.83% |
| Total | 17,753 | 1,214 | 18,967 | 100% |

=== Religion ===
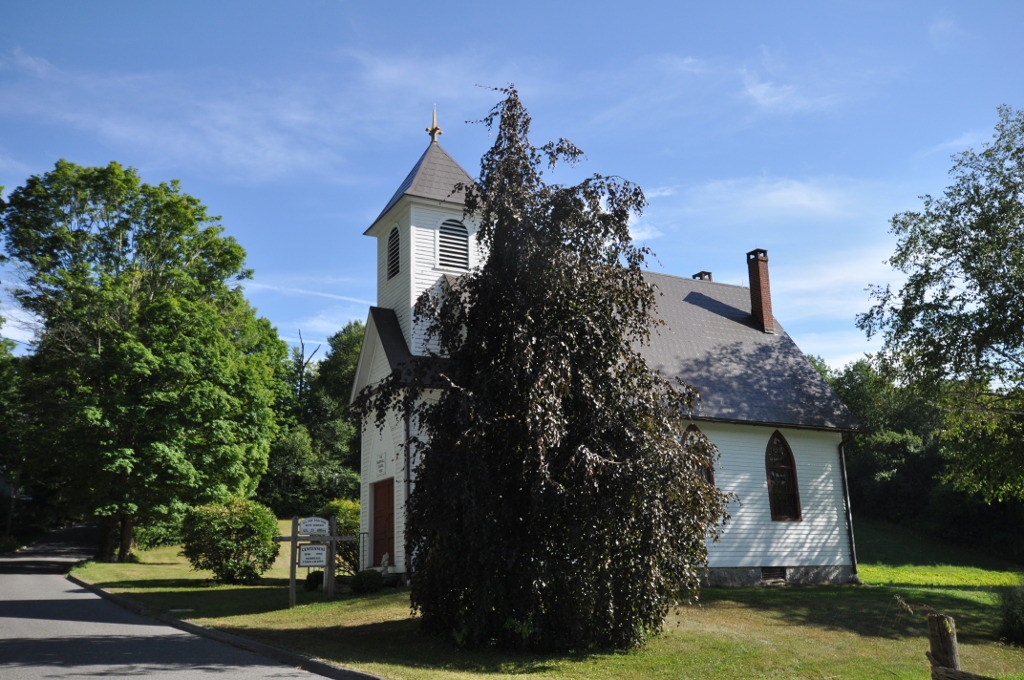
The Merryall Union Chapel in Lower Meryall, New Milford.

New Milford is known for its large church and religious school, the nondenominational Faith Church. It is also home to two Catholic churches, a Lutheran church, Christian Science community, longstanding Quaker community, house of worship belonging to the United Church of Christ, United Methodist church, and an Assemblies of God (Pentecostal) church, as well the Episcopalian (Anglican) St. John's Episcopal Church, located next to the town green. A Jewish Reform synagogue, Temple Sholom, is located near the town's border with Sherman.

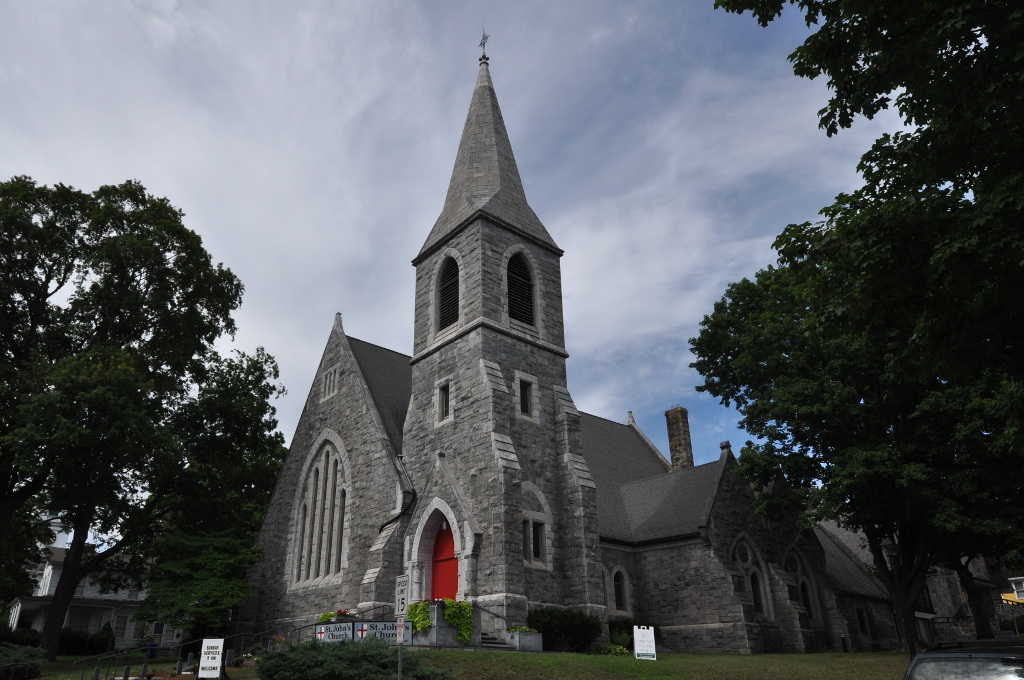
St. John's Episcopal Church in downtown New Milford.

The Canterbury School, a well-known Catholic boarding school, is located near downtown New Milford.

== Sports ==
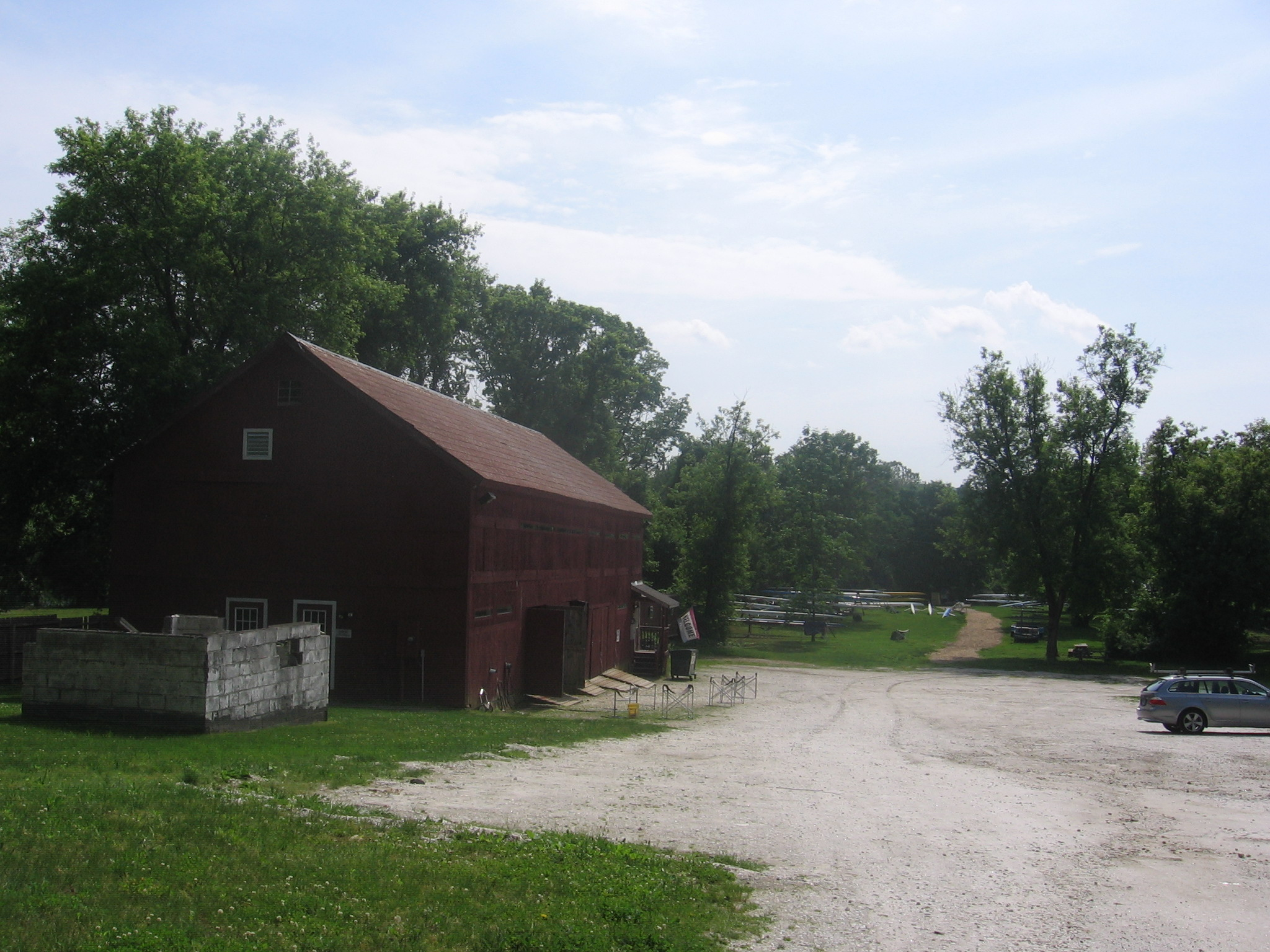
GMS Rowing Center

New Milford is home to the GMS Rowing Center. Founded in 2003, it manages a US Rowing Training Center Program. It has a highly successful Middle and High School (Junior) Program which competes at Youth National Championships, Junior National Team Trials, The "Royal Canadian Henley" and has sent rowers to the Junior World Rowing Championships. In 2011 GMS also had rowers representing the US at the Under 23 World Championships in Amsterdam, the Netherlands and at the World Rowing Championships at Bled, Slovenia.

== Education ==
It is in the New Milford School District.

=== Elementary schools ===
- Northville Elementary School
- Hill & Plain Elementary School

=== Intermediate schools ===
- Sarah Noble Intermediate School
- Schaghticoke Middle School

=== High schools ===
- New Milford High School

=== Private schools ===
- Canterbury School
  - New Milford is home to the Canterbury School, a well-known Roman Catholic boarding school. The school's Chapel of Our Lady features the Jose M. Ferrer Memorial Carillon.
- Faith Preparatory
- Education without Walls

== Infrastructure ==
=== Transportation ===
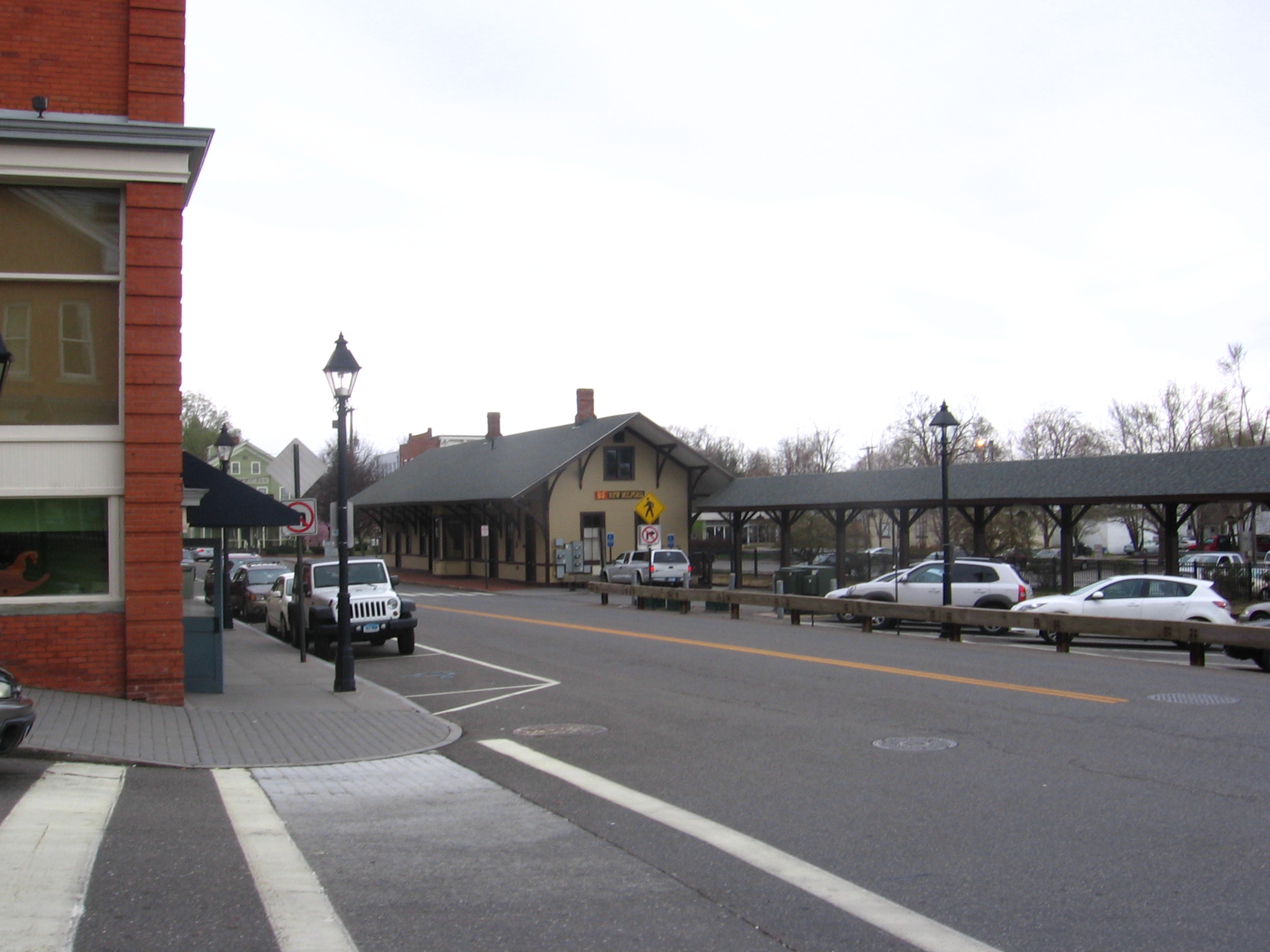
New Milford station building

New Milford is served by fixed-bus routes of the Housatonic Area Regional Transit. The main highways of the town are U.S. Route 7 and U.S. Route 202.

There has been continued talk about a proposal to electrify and restore the Danbury Branch of the Metro-North Railroad north of Danbury to New Milford. These efforts have included a Rail Study in 2008, proposed state legislation in 2017, and stimulus money in 2021. The Danbury Branch provides commuter rail service between Danbury, to South Norwalk, Stamford, and Grand Central Terminal in New York City. The tracks north of Danbury are currently used by the Housatonic Railroad for freight service.

== Notable people ==
- Léonie Fuller Adams (1899–1988), poetry consultant to the Library of Congress (now titled poet laureate)
- Charles A. Beard (1874–1948), historian, activist
- Mary R. Beard (1876–1958), historian, activist
- Elizabeth Bentley (1908–1963), spy
- David Sherman Boardman (1768–1864), lawyer, judge and politician
- Elijah Boardman (1760–1823), U.S. senator
- William Whiting Boardman (1794–1871), U.S. congressman
- Emily Sophie Brown (1881–1985), one of the first women to serve in the Connecticut House of Representatives
- Kenny Coolbeth (born 1977), motorcycling champion
- Fortunato Depero (1892–1960), painter, writer, sculptor and graphic designer
- Jack Douglas (1908–1989), writer
- Florence Eldridge (1901–1988), stage and screen actress
- Diane von Fürstenberg (born 1946), fashion designer, who plans to be buried at her 100-acre (0.40 km^{2}) farm in town
- Peter Gallagher, actor
- Ethan Hawke (born 1970), actor, writer
- Lillian Hellman (1905–1984), playwright
- Skitch Henderson (1918–2005), pianist, composer and conductor
- Eric Hodgins (1899–1971), author
- Ian Hunter (born 1939), English singer-songwriter
- Keith Kane, guitarist and founding member of Vertical Horizon
- Eartha Kitt (1927–2008), singer, actress, author
- Columbia Lancaster (1803–1893), U.S. congressman
- Jeremy Levin, businessman, physician and scientist
- Max Lowenthal (1888–1971), lawyer and civil servant
- Fredric March (1897–1975), film and stage actor
- Florence Maybrick (1862–1941), accused murderer, prison reform advocate
- Maryann Measles (1984-1997), murder victim
- Seth Meyers, American stand-up comedian, television host, actor, writer, and producer
- Hap Moran (1901–1994), football player
- Dhan Gopal Mukerji (1890–1936), writer, author, Newbery Medal recipient 1928
- William H. Noble (1788–1850), U.S. congressman
- M. Scott Peck (1936–2005), psychiatrist and self-help author
- Natacha Rambova (1897–1966), costume and set designer, dancer, actress, academic, former wife of Rudolph Valentino
- Thomas Riley, US ambassador to Morocco 2003–2009
- Joan Rivers (1933–2014), comedian, actress, writer, producer
- Roger Sherman (1721–1793), signer of Declaration of Independence and Constitution
- Jean Simmons (1929–2010), British actress
- Eric Sloane (1905–1985), artist
- Walker Todd (1786–1840), lawyer, member of the New York State Senate (2nd D.) and Inspector of Mount Pleasant State Prison
- Solmous Wakeley (1794–1867), pioneer Wisconsin legislator
- Mary B. Weaver (1887–1978), Connecticut politician
- Joseph J. Went (born 1930), general
- Horace Wheaton (1803–1882), U.S. congressman
- Theodore White (1915–1986), political author of the 1960s–1970s
- Gladys Mary Wrigley (1885–1975) geographer and journal editor.

== Movies filmed in New Milford ==
The following movies with their actual or expected year of release have been filmed in New Milford:

- The Brass Ring (1983) (TV)
- Mr. Deeds (2002)
- Zero Day (2003)
- What Alice Found (2003)
- The Ballad of Jack and Rose (2005)
- The Six Wives of Henry LeFay (2007)
- The Private Lives of Pippa Lee (2009)
- 25/8 renamed to My Soul to Take (2009)
- Candlewood (2022)
- Matchbox: The Movie (2026)
