= Lanesville =

Lanesville may refer to:

- Lanesville, Indiana
- Lanesville, New York, a hamlet in Greene County, New York
- Lanesville, Nova Scotia
- Lanesville, Virginia
- Lanesville, a neighborhood of Gloucester, Massachusetts
- Lanesville, Connecticut
