= Murder of Maryann Measles =

1997 murder of a 13-year-old girl in Connecticut, U.S.

- Undated image of Measles distributed after her disappearance
- Date: October 19, 1997
- Location: New Milford, Connecticut, U.S.; 41°37′24″N 73°27′43.5″W
- Type: Kidnapping, sexual assault, torture murder
- Motive: Victim intimidation/elimination, revenge
- Deaths: Maryann Measles, aged 13
- Convicted: Alan M. "A.J." Walter; Keith M. Foster; Deaneric "Dino" Dupas III; Dorothy Hallas; Maggie Mae Bennett; Ronald A. Rajcok; June Bates Segar; Jeffrey A. Boyette
- Verdict: Guilty
- Convictions: Felony murder, first-degree kidnapping, conspiracy to commit first-degree kidnapping, conspiracy to commit first-degree sexual assault, tampering with physical evidence, risk of injury to a minor, tampering with a witness, and conspiracy to commit murder
- Sentence: Walter: 60 years in prison Foster: 110 years in prison Dupas: 47 years in prison Hallas: 25 years in prison Bennett: 19 years in prison Rajcok: 36 years in prison Segar: 30 years in prison Boyette: 50 years in prison (suspended after 25)

On October 19, 1997, 13-year-old Maryann Jeanine Measles was abducted from the parking lot of a New Milford, Connecticut shopping center, while waiting for her mother. A group of eight former friends planned and committed her murder. Her body was discovered in nearby Lake Lillinonah approximately nine months later. All eight individuals involved in the murder were charged. The case garnered national media attention due to the crime's brutality.

== Victim ==
Maryann Measles was born on March 22, 1984, to parents Martin and Cyndi Measles in Sharon, Connecticut. She grew up in New Milford with her sisters Jennifer, Victoria, and Chelsea. She was a seventh grade student at Schaghticoke Middle School at the time of her disappearance.

== Events prior to the murder ==
Measles began spending time with an older group of friends during the summer of 1997, only three months before they all participated in her murder. The group included Keith Foster, Dorothy Hallas, Maggie Mae Bennett, Alan Walter, Jeffrey Boyette, Ronald Rajcok, Deaneric Dupas, and June Segar. In the months leading up to the murder, Measles had been sexually molested by some men in the crew, including Alan Walter and Keith Foster. This was an initial cause of tension for the women in the group, including Foster's girlfriend Dorothy Hallas, and Maggie Bennett, who was dating Walter.

In early October, Measles confided to her mother that she had sex with the adult men. Despite initial hesitation, Maryann and her mother decided to file statutory rape charges with the New Milford police. While only one official report was filed regarding Walter, they planned to return to file a report on Foster as well. Upon learning of Measles's intentions, Dupas informed Walter, and the group devised a plan to silence her.

== Events of October 19, 1997 ==
The day of her murder, Measles could sense that her life was in danger. While at the New Milford Town Green that day, Maggie Bennett, Alan Walter, and June Segar were circling Measles in Bennett's mini van, yelling at her and hurling out threats. Feeling uneasy, Measles called her mother from a payphone near the Green's gazebo and asked for a ride home. Cyndi Measles picked Measles up but needed to stop for milk and bread at the nearby Big Y at Veterans Plaza. As Measles waited in the parking lot for her mother to finish her errand, she was approached by Ronald Rajcok, who forced her into his Pontiac Trans Am. She was driven to a pull-off on River Road, where the group of friends had gathered. Measles was beaten, gang-raped, drowned, bound in chains, and dumped into the Housatonic River.

== Investigation and judicial process ==
After a search of about nine months, Measles's body was found near a boat launch at Lake Lillinonah in Bridgewater, Connecticut, where it connects to the Housatonic. Her remains were wrapped in a blanket and chains. Her identity was confirmed by dental records.

In 2002, authorities announced the arrests of eight people for the killing of Measles, including Jeffrey Boyette, who had since relocated to Texas, and required extradition to face charges. Walter and Dupas were the only two charged with capital murder. However, both men made plea deals to avoid the death penalty. Alan Walter pleaded guilty to felony murder, first-degree kidnapping, conspiracy to commit first-degree kidnapping, conspiracy to commit first-degree sexual assault, and tampering with physical evidence, earning him a sentence of 60 years in prison. Deaneric Dupas also pleaded guilty to felony murder, conspiracy to commit first-degree kidnapping, and conspiracy to commit first-degree sexual assault. He was sentenced to 47 years in prison. Keith Foster was sentenced to the most lengthy prison term of the group, 110 years, for charges including felony murder, first-degree sexual assault, three counts of first-degree kidnapping, conspiracy to commit first-degree kidnapping, tampering with a witness, and tampering with physical evidence. Foster's girlfriend, Dorothy Halls, was charged with and pleaded guilty to felony murder, conspiracy to commit first-degree kidnapping, and risk of injury to a minor. She was sentenced to 25 years in prison and five years probation. Maggie Mae Bennett, Walter's girlfriend, was charged with first-degree kidnapping, conspiracy to commit kidnapping, risk of injury to a minor, tampering with a witness, and tampering with evidence. Due to her cooperation with prosecutors, Bennett was sentenced to only 19 years in prison. She was released in 2019. Ronald Rajcok was sentenced to 36 years in prison after pleading guilty to charges of felony murder, first-degree kidnapping, conspiracy to commit first-degree kidnapping, risk of injury to a minor, and tampering with a witness. As part of a plea bargain, June Segar was found guilty of felony murder, conspiracy to commit first-degree kidnapping, and tampering with a witness. She received a sentence of 30 years in prison. Jeffrey Boyette pleaded no contest to felony murder, first-degree sexual assault, first-degree kidnapping, and risk of injury to a minor. He was sentenced to 50 years in prison, suspended after 25 years.

=== Appeals ===
Keith M. Foster, the only defendant to go to trial, appealed his conviction in 2009, but the appeal was rejected.

== See also ==
- List of solved missing person cases: 1950–1999
