= New Milford Center Historic District =

Historic district in Connecticut, United States

- U.S. National Register of Historic Places
- U.S. Historic district
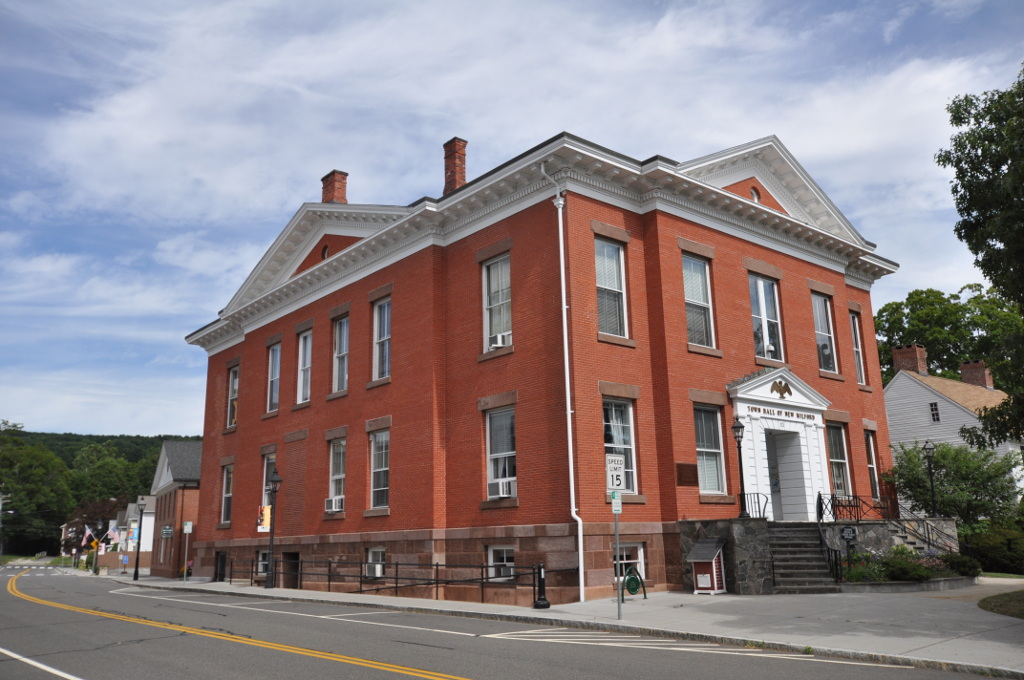
- New Milford Town Hall

- Location within Connecticut Location within the United States
- Location: Bennett and Elm Streets, Center Cemetery, East, South Main, Mill, and Railroad Streets, New Milford, Connecticut
- Area: 55 acres (22 ha)
- Built: 1870
- Architect: Northrup, Joseph W.; Et al.
- Architectural style: Late 19th And 20th Century Revivals, Late Victorian, Greek Revival
- NRHP reference No.: 86001255
- Added to NRHP: June 13, 1986

The New Milford Center Historic District encompasses much of the traditional civic and commercial heart of New Milford, Connecticut.

== Description and history ==
New Milford's town center was originally focused around its town green, a long three-block greensward located just East of the present Downtown area. This remained the focus of civic and commercial activity until the Housatonic Railroad opened in 1840. The area between the green and the railroad then developed as a commercial hub, as the town grew to become a major service center for surrounding communities. Later in the 19th century, as tobacco became a major crop in the Housatonic River valley, New Milford also became a center for the drying and processing of tobacco leaves, an industry that was one of its largest employers. As a result of these growth patterns, the downtown area features architecturally significant buildings from the late 19th and early 20th centuries, and some of its surrounding residential areas have significant housing stock from that period.

The historic district is roughly bounded on the east by East Street and South Main Street, the south by Mill Street, the west by South Main Street and Railroad Street (excluding many of the buildings on the latter roadway), and on the north by Bennitt and Elm Streets. Prominent features include one of the state's longest town greens, which is lined mainly by civic and residential buildings, and the cluster of commercial brick and stone buildings along Bank and Main Streets near the southern end of the green. Residential areas with fine 19th-century Victorian houses fringe the district, on South Main, East, and Bennitt Streets. Separately listed buildings on the National Register that are in the district include the United Bank Building and the E. A. Wildman & Co. Tobacco Warehouse; the district excludes the separately listed railroad station.

== See also ==
- National Register of Historic Places listings in Litchfield County, Connecticut
