= Merritt Beach & Son Building =

- U.S. National Register of Historic Places
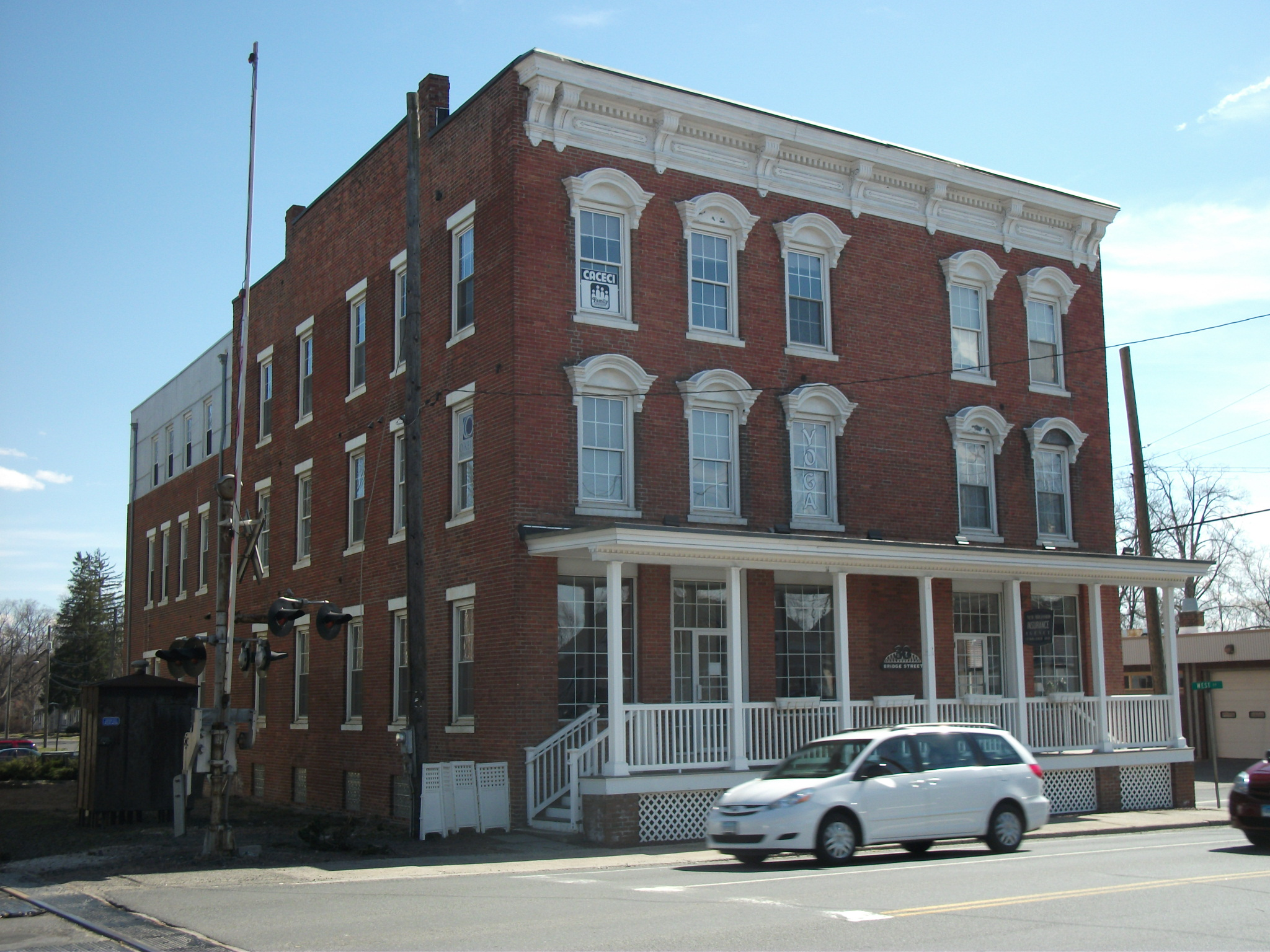

- Location within Connecticut Location within the United States
- Location: 30 Bridge Street, U.S. Route 202 New Milford, Connecticut
- Coordinates: 41°34′35″N 73°24′43″W
- Area: 0.2 acres (0.081 ha)
- Built: 1873
- Built by: Beach, Merritt, & Son
- Architectural style: Italianate
- NRHP reference No.: 92000403
- Added to NRHP: April 28, 1992

The Merritt Beach & Son Building is a historic commercial building at 30 Bridge Street U.S. Route 202 in New Milford, Connecticut. Built in 1873, it is one of the town's oldest surviving commercial buildings. It was built for Merritt Beach & Son, a lumber and hardware merchant that is one of its oldest continuously operating businesses (although it is no longer at this site). The building was listed on the National Register of Historic Places in 1992.

== Description and history ==
The Merritt Beach & Son Building stands just outside New Milford's main downtown business district, on the west side of railroad tracks and the South Side of Bridge Street (U.S. Route 7) and (U.S. Route 202). It is a three-story brick building with Italianate styling. Its front facade is five bays wide, with a gap between the right two bays and those to the left. Windows on the upper floors are topped by bracketed segmented-arch hoods, and a single-story porch flat-roof porch extends across the first floor, supported by square posts with simple balustrades between. An elaborate bracketed and dentillated cornice crowns the building. To the main block's rear area series of additions that are mainly lumber sheds that have been readapted for other uses.

The firm of Canfield and Beach began business in New Milford in 1857 as a lumber concern. After Canfield withdrew from the business in 1866, it was run by a succession of members of the Beach and Barlow families, and was in 1992 the town's oldest continuously operating business. It built this building in 1873 to house its hardware store, a tobacco storage warehouse on the second floor, and a public meeting hall on the third. The firm operated on these premises until 1977. It is the only surviving commercial building from that period to survive in the town.

== See also ==
- National Register of Historic Places listings in Litchfield County, Connecticut
