= Sarah Noble Intermediate School =

Coordinates: 41.6201°N 73.3929°W

Location
- 25 Sunny Valley Road; New Milford, Connecticut 06776

Information
- School type: Public, school district
- Grades: 3-5
- Enrollment: 1237
- Information: (860)-210-4020
- Website: Official website

Sarah Noble Intermediate School is an intermediate school located in the historic town of New Milford, Connecticut. The school was named after Anglo-American girl Sarah Noble.

In 1707, John Noble Sr., previously of Westfield, Massachusetts and his eight-year-old daughter Sarah Noble were the first Anglo-American settlers.
