= Mary B. Weaver =

American farmer and politician (1887–1978)

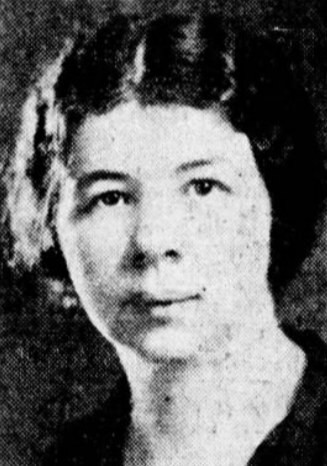

Member of the Connecticut House of Representatives from New Milford
- In office 1923–1929

Member of the Connecticut Senate from the 32nd district
- In office 1929–1931
- Preceded by: Scovill M. Buckingham
- Succeeded by: James M. Whittlesey

Member of the Connecticut House of Representatives from New Milford
- In office 1939–1941

Personal details
- Born: December 12, 1887 Washington, Connecticut, U.S.
- Died: August 28, 1978 (aged 90) New Milford, Connecticut, U.S.
- Party: Republican

Mary Baker Weaver (December 12, 1887 – August 28, 1978) was an American farmer and state legislator in Connecticut. A Republican, she served in the Connecticut House of Representatives from 1923 to 1929, representing the town of New Milford, and the Connecticut Senate from 1929 to 1931, representing the 32nd district. She again represented New Milford in the House of Representatives from 1939 to 1941.

== Early life and education ==
Weaver was born on December 12, 1887, in Washington, Connecticut to Vincent Sterling Weaver and Jennie Seeley (née Baker). While as a small child she lived in Colorado and California and able to speak Spanish, she grew up and lived in New Milford. After her father died in 1893, her mother soon remarried to Andrew G. Barnes, who later became a Connecticut state representative in 1895 then state senator in 1907.

Weaver graduated from New Milford Normal School. After her step-father's death, she took over management of the family farm, a tobacco farm named Candlewood. She also taught school.

== Political career ==
Weaver was elected to the Connecticut House of Representatives for the 1923 term on the Republican ticket representing New Milford, one of seven women elected that term. A proponent of women's suffrage, she was elected for two additional terms serving until 1929. Serving on the committee of human institutions, she believed inmates were afforded more "luxuries" than rich families and was concerned about the influx of immigrants who made of the majority of inmates. She also expressed the need for more hospitals to treat tuberculosis and a new a psychiatric hospital. In 1927, she was elected to the coveted appropriations committee.

In 1928, Weaver was elected to the Connecticut's 1929 Senate representing the 32nd district. She was the only woman serving in the 1929 senate session after Alice Merritt lost her re-election bid for the 2nd district. As a senator, she introduced a failed bill to allow women to serve as jurors and supported a failed bill to decriminalize the use of birth control. Believing billboards were unsightly and hazardous, Weaver introduced a bill to limit the placement of billboards to business and commercial areas and prohibit them in rural areas.

From 1939 to 1941, Weaver again served in the House of Representatives. She ran for reelection in 1940 but lost the nomination.

== Death ==
Weaver died on August 28, 1978, in New Milford. In 2008 she was inducted into the New Milford's Daughters of the American Revolution Hall of Fame.
