= United Bank Building =

- U.S. National Register of Historic Places
- U.S. Historic district – Contributing property
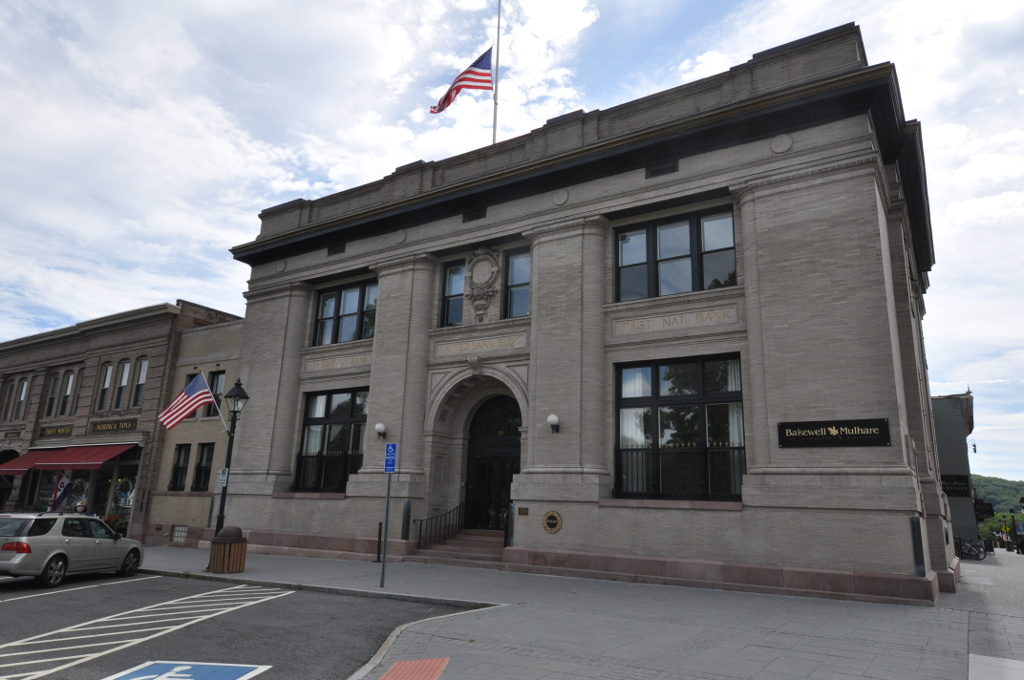

- Location within Connecticut Location within the United States
- Location: 19–21 Main Street, New Milford, Connecticut
- Coordinates: 41°34′38″N 73°24′42″W
- Area: less than one acre
- Built: 1902–04
- Architect: Wilson Potter
- Architectural style: Classical Revival
- Part of: New Milford Center Historic District (ID86001255)
- NRHP reference No.: 82004447

Significant dates
- Added to NRHP: April 12, 1982
- Designated CP: June 13, 1986

The United Bank Building is a historic commercial building at 19–21 Main Street in Downtown New Milford, Connecticut. Designed by Wilson Potter and built 1902–04, it is a prominent local example of Classical Revival architecture, built to house two banks whose previous buildings had been destroyed in a fire. The building was listed on the National Register of Historic Places in 1982, and is a contributing element of the New Milford Center Historic District.

== Description and history ==
The United Bank Building occupies a prominent location in downtown New Milford, at the top end of Bank Street, one of its main commercial streets, where it meets the town common. It is a two-story masonry structure, built out of buff-colored brick with brownstone trim. Its main facade, facing Main street and the common, is three bays wide, articulated by broad piers which rise to a multilevel cornice and parapeted roof. The main entrance is in the central bay, recessed in a tall round-arch opening. Above the arch is a recessed panel incised with the building name, with a decorative cartouche above that, flanked by sash windows. The flanking bays each have three-part window groups in both the first and second levels. The interior has a central vestibule and hall, which separate the spaces historically allotted to the two banks that were its initial occupants.

On May 5, 1902, a fire struck the New England House, a locally well known tavern and inn located at the corner of Bank and Main Streets. The conflagration also consumed the adjacent buildings of the New Milford Savings Bank and the New Milford First National Bank, located down Bank Street. The two banks immediately organized to rebuild, quickly agreeing in principle to build a joint facility on the site of the tavern. Their committee accepted a design from Wilson Potter, an architect then based in New York City. The large-scale features of the building and its prominent setting on the town common make it an imposing feature of the town's commercial district.

== See also ==
- National Register of Historic Places listings in Litchfield County, Connecticut
