= David Sherman Boardman =

American politician

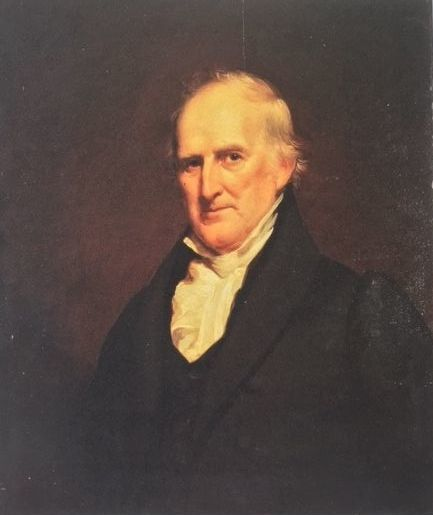
- Born: December 8, 1768
- Died: December 2, 1864 (aged 95)
- Alma mater: Yale University
- Occupation: Lawyer, politician, judge
- Parent(s): Sherman Boardman
- Position held: Member of the Connecticut House of Representatives

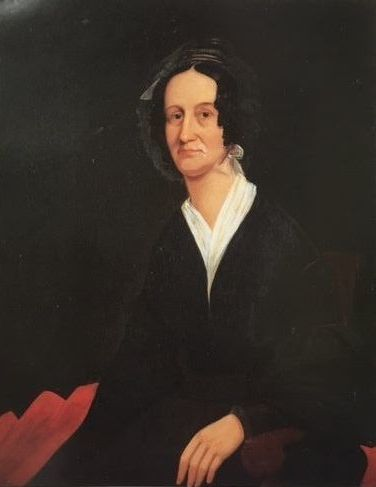
Charlotte Taylor Boardman

David Sherman Boardman (December 8, 1768 – December 2, 1864) was an American lawyer, judge, and state assemblyman in the early United States.

The youngest child of Deacon Sherman and Sarah (Bostwick) Boardman, he lived for nearly his entire life in New Milford. He was born at a farm near Housatonic, and suffered severe illness. For a time this illness Attendance at school in his father's house for a few months, and in the village for four months at the age of fourteen, gave him all the common-school education he received.

For a time, failure in his eyesight seemed to bar him from further education; however in 1791, after stints in local boarding schools, he matriculated at Yale University. Near the end of his first semester, he was elected member of the Phi Beta Kappa Society. He graduated in 1793.

In 1796 Yale President Dwight proposed to nominate him as a tutor, but he had already been admitted to the Bar, and declined the offer. He opened an office in his native town. He practiced in Litchfield and Fairfield counties. After thirty-six years, he was appointed for five successive years Chief Judge of the County Court for Litchfield County, before he was displaced for political reasons. He was made Judge of Probate for the district of New Milford in 1805, and held the place by successive annual appointments for sixteen years. He was Justice of the Peace for thirty-two years. He was elected Representative to the General Assembly eight times. In 1808, he was elected a member of the Connecticut Society of Arts and Sciences, and was vice-president of the Connecticut Historical Society from its first establishment.

He married May 18, 1806, Charlotte Taylor, the daughter of Nathaniel Taylor, Esq., and they had seven children. John Taylor, April 17, 1807; Catharine Ann, December 12, 1808, died October 9, 1811; George William, February 26, 1811, died September 23, 1815; Charles Sherman, December 4, 1812, died October 26, 1815; Augustus, April 19, 1814, died October 31, 1815; Frederick, July 20, 1817, died July 17, 1876, and Mary Cornelia, May 29, 1819.

In March 1838, he was admitted with his wife to the fellowship of the Congregational Church.

He was from the first to the last a Washingtonian Federalist. At ten years, he had seen Washington in an encampment some twenty miles off. A local party of Jeffersonians was early organized in New Milford and supported by two of his brothers, but this circumstance did not abate the form of his allegiance to federalist principles, nor on the other hand did it weaken the tenderness of his fraternal love.

Henry Clay and Daniel Webster were the objects of his profoundest admiration. He rarely wrote for publication. He contributed however a few papers of great value for the newspapers, and for the New Englander of November 1858, a review of Mr. J. C. Hamilton's History of the United States, as traced in the writings of Alexander Hamilton, also for the American Quarterly Church Review for January 1859, a review of Parton's Life and Times of Aaron Burr, and in 1860 a pamphlet entitled Early Lights of the Litchfield Bar.

== Bibliography ==
- Kilborn, Dwight Canfield (2002). The Bench and Bar of Litchfield County, Connecticut, 1709-1909. Clark, NJ: Lawbook Exchange.
- Klafter, Craig Evan (1993). Reason Over Precedent. Wesport: Greenwood Press.
- Orcutt, Samuel (1882). History of the Towns of New Milford and Bridgewater, (Litchfield County), Connecticut, 1703-1882.
