= J. S. Halpine Tobacco Warehouse =

- U.S. National Register of Historic Places
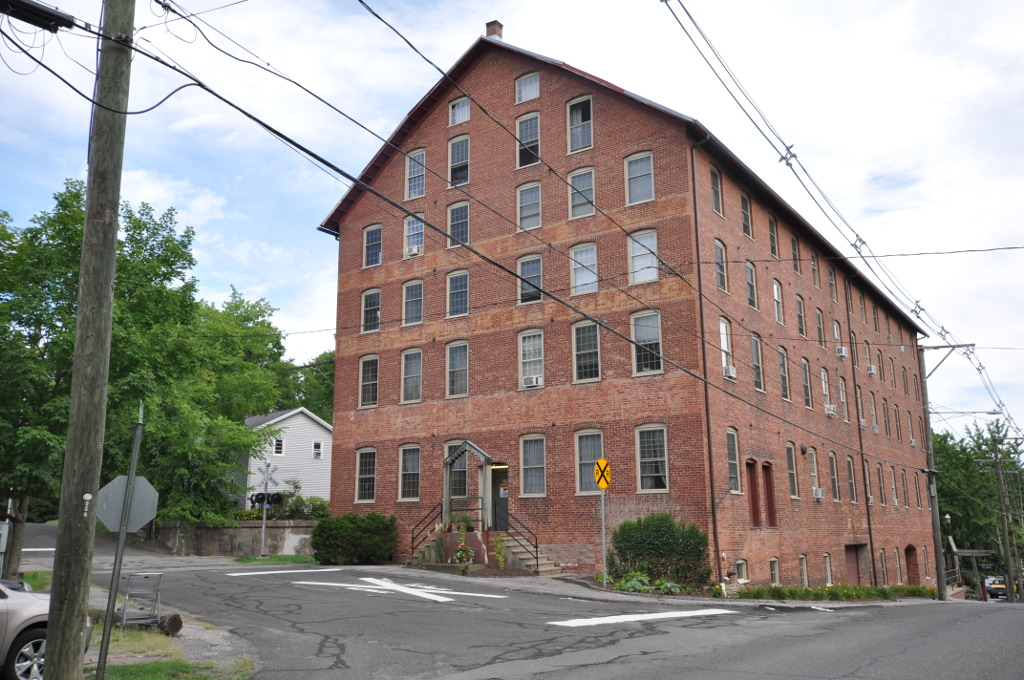

- Location within Connecticut Location within the United States
- Location: West and Mill Streets, New Milford, Connecticut
- Coordinates: 41°34′21″N 73°24′40″W
- Area: less than one acre
- Built: 1896
- NRHP reference No.: 82001002
- Added to NRHP: December 16, 1982

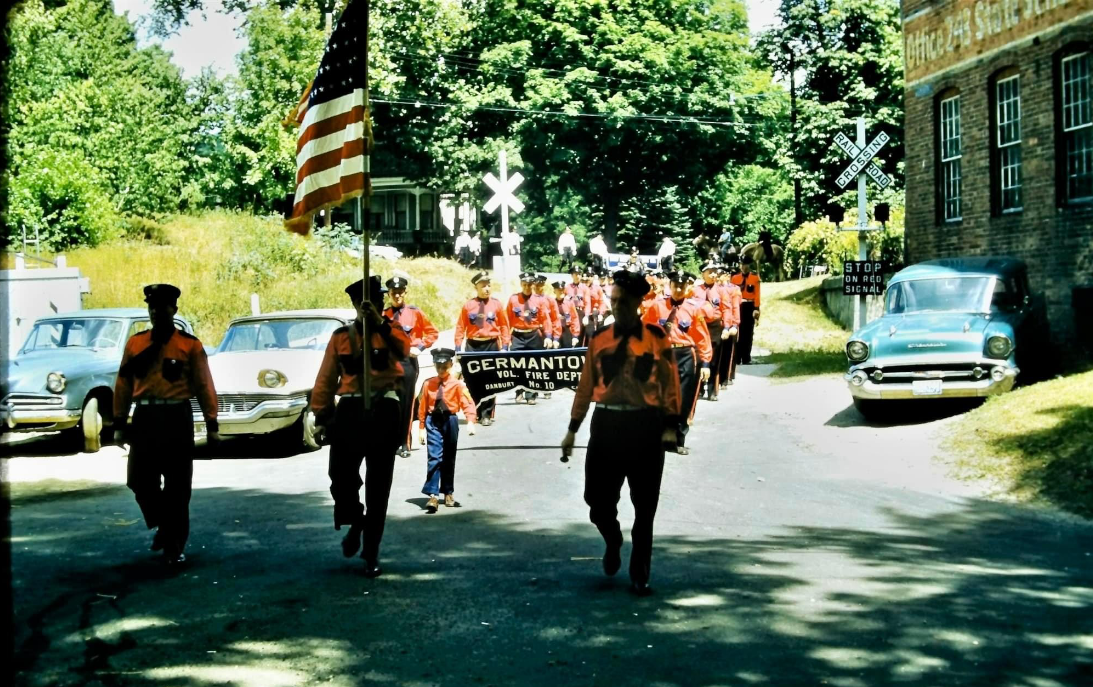
1955; Parade on Mill Street passing the warehouse.

The J. S. Halpine Tobacco Warehouse is a historic tobacco warehouse at West and Mill Streets in New Milford, Connecticut. Built c. 1900–02 for one of the area's leading tobacco processors, it is a reminder of tobacco's historic economic importance in northwestern Connecticut. The building was listed on the National Register of Historic Places in 1982. It has been converted to residential use.

== Description and history ==
The J.S. Halpine Tobacco Warehouse stands in what is now a largely residential area south of downtown New Milford, at the southwest corner of West and Mill Streets, and adjacent to the railroad tracks of the Housatonic Railroad. It is a 5 1/2-story brick structure, with a two-stage roof that is mostly gabled, with a slight gambrel. Its modest stylistic elements include segmented-arch window openings and a gabled surround for the main pedestrian entrance, which is on the north side. Openings formerly used for loading and unloading tobacco (now largely boarded over) are located on the long east and west facade. The interior has heavy timber framing supporting wooden floors.

The warehouse was built c. 1900–02, at a time when this region of the Housatonic River valley was a major tobacco production region. It was built for J.S. Halpine, agent for Rossin & Sons, a tobacco firm that was at the time one of the region's largest employers. The property was used for tobacco sorting and curing until that business collapsed in the late 1930s. During this period the Housatonic valley produced cigar wrapping leaves for major domestic cigar manufacturers. This warehouse is one of the few buildings left in New Milford that is associated with that business and time period, and is the region's largest surviving tobacco warehouse.

== See also ==
- National Register of Historic Places listings in Litchfield County, Connecticut
