= Carl F. Schoverling Tobacco Warehouse =

- U.S. National Register of Historic Places
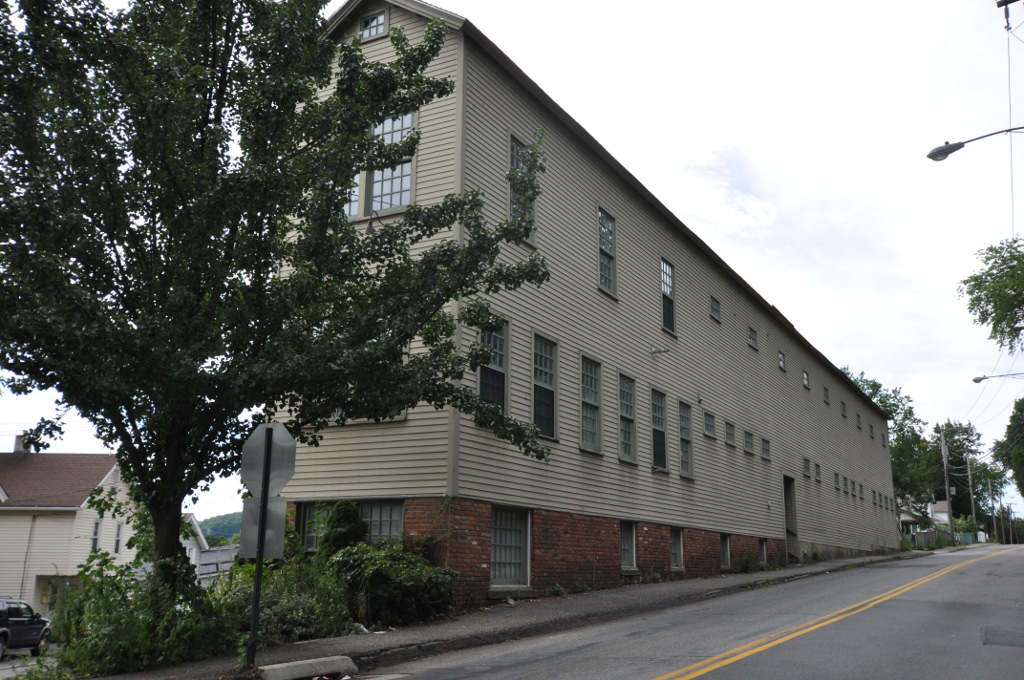

- Location within Connecticut Location within the United States
- Location: 1 Wellsville Avenue, New Milford, Connecticut
- Coordinates: 41°34′50.6″N 73°24′56.8″W
- Area: less than one acre
- Built: 1897
- Built by: Soule, Turney & Co.
- NRHP reference No.: 82004446
- Added to NRHP: April 12, 1982

The Carl F. Schoverling Tobacco Warehouse is a historic industrial storage building at 1 Wellsville Avenue in New Milford, Connecticut. Also known locally as the Flatiron Building, it was built in 1897 by one of the region's leading tobacco processing businesses, and is one of only two such buildings to surviving from period in the town. It was listed on the National Register of Historic Places in 1982.

== Description and history ==
The former Schoverling Tobacco Warehouse stands North of Downtown New Milford, occupying a roughly triangular lot at the Northern Junction of Wellsville Avenue and Housatonic Avenue. It is a two-story wood frame structure with a flat roof, clapboarded exterior, and partially exposed brick foundation. It presents a narrow two-bay facade to the street junction, and gradually widens. Its main facade is the long side facing Wellness Avenue, while the western facade, facing Housatonic Avenue, is where shipping activities were originally focused. The building interior retains massive timber framing, and a rare example of an early elevator, originally powered by a water pump.

When this warehouse was built in 1897, it was described as one of the most advanced tobacco warehouses in the country, featuring all of the latest amenities. New Milford was then the primary center for processing tobacco leaf grown in the Housatonic River valley, used for wrapping cigars. It was built by Carl Schoverling, the son and nephew of two German immigrants who were major figures in the local tobacco industry. The building originally had wings extending to the west (where Housatonic Avenue) now runs, and was conveniently sited near the Housatonic Railroad. Its use by the Schoverlings was short-lived: the business closed in 1903, apparently due to setbacks caused by repeated crop failures. After passing through bank ownership, it was again used as a tobacco warehouse into the 1930s, after which it has been used by a variety of other businesses.

== See also ==
- National Register of Historic Places listings in Litchfield County, Connecticut
