= Merryall Union Evangelical Society Chapel =

Historic church in Connecticut, United States

- U.S. National Register of Historic Places
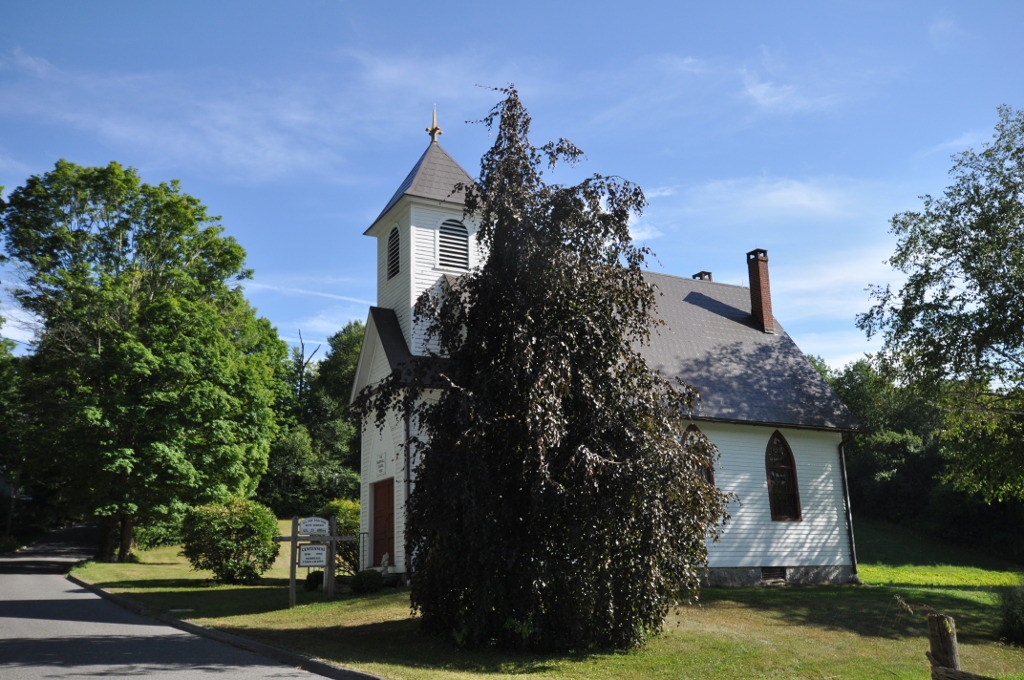

- Location within Connecticut Location within the United States
- Location: Chapel Hill Road, New Milford, Connecticut
- Coordinates: 41°38′50″N 73°25′11″W
- Area: 0.1 acres (0.040 ha)
- Built: 1890
- Built by: Soule, Tourney & Co.; Et al.
- Architectural style: Gothic
- NRHP reference No.: 86001240
- Added to NRHP: June 5, 1986

The Merryall Union Evangelical Society Chapel (also known as Merryall Union Chapel) is a historic church building on Chapel Hill Road in the Lower Merryall section of New Milford, Connecticut. Built in 1890, it is the town's best example of Carpenter Gothic architecture. It is used in the summertime for services by visiting ministers of diverse denominations, and hosts weddings and other private functions. It was listed on the National Register of Historic Places in 1986.

== Description and history ==
The Merryall Chapel stands in a rural setting about 4 miles (6.4 km) north of the center of New Milford, on the west side of Chapel Hill Road. It is a single-story wood-frame structure, with a steeply pitched gabled roof and clapboarded exterior. A square tower projects from the center of the street-facing front facade, rising to a pyramidal roof and fleur-du-lis finial. The entrance is in the base of the tower, topped by a lancet-arched panel. Lancet-arch windows line the side walls. The interior is decorated in a Victorian style, with spindle-backed chairs for seating of the congregation, and a raised platform at the rear serves as the altar, furnished with velvet armchairs and couch.

The Merryall Union Evangelical Association was founded in 1884 as a vehicle to provide Sunday School education to children in the area. The present chapel was an outgrowth of that organization, which expanded to offer regular services to local residents, who would otherwise have to make the sometimes difficult journey to the town center for services. Services were typically provided by traveling ministers or ministers from other area churches, and were usually non-denominational. About 1900, care of the building fell to a local sewing club, and services were regularly offered during the summer, bringing in summer residents of the area. A new nonprofit was established in the 1970s to oversee maintenance of the building.

== See also ==
- National Register of Historic Places listings in Litchfield County, Connecticut
