= John Glover Noble House =

Historic house in Connecticut, United States

- U.S. National Register of Historic Places
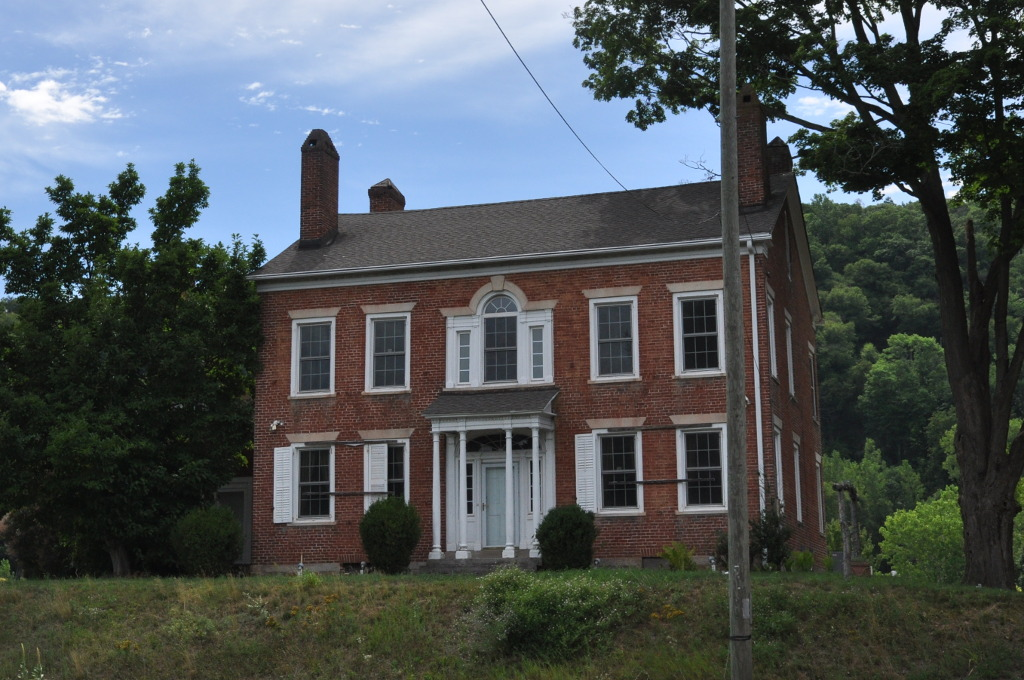

- Location within Connecticut Location within the United States
- Location: 586 Danbury Road, New Milford, Connecticut
- Coordinates: 41°30′17″N 73°25′9″W
- Area: 2 acres (0.81 ha)
- Built: 1820
- Architectural style: Federal, Adams Style
- NRHP reference No.: 77001402
- Added to NRHP: August 29, 1977

The John Glover Noble House is a historic house at 586 Danbury Road (U.S. Route 202) in New Milford, Connecticut. Built in the 1820s, it is a fine local example of Federal period architecture executed in brick. It was listed on the National Register of Historic Places in 1977. It has most recently been used for commercial purposes, housing an antique shop.

== Description and history ==
The John Glover Noble House is located on the west side of Danbury Road, a short way north of New Milford's border with Brookfield. It is a 2 1/2-story brick building, with a side gable roof and four end chimneys. It is oriented facing east on a rise above the road. It has a five-bay front facade, with sash windows set in rectangular openings topped by splayed stone lintels. The front entrance is at the center, flanked by sidelight windows, and pilasters. It is sheltered by a shed-roof portico with slender round columns. A Palladian window is set above the entrance, with pilasters articulating its elements.

The house was built in the 1820s by John Glover Noble, a descendant of one of New Milford's founders, and remained in the family for several generations. Its bricks were made in a family brickyard, its iron fixtures in a family ironworks, and the glass for its windows came from a glassworks in Marbledale. The house was described in the 1930s by Edna Ferber as "the most beautiful in America" in her novel An American Beauty. It is set to be opened as an antique shop in 2017.

== See also ==
- National Register of Historic Places listings in Litchfield County, Connecticut
