= New Milford station =

New Milford
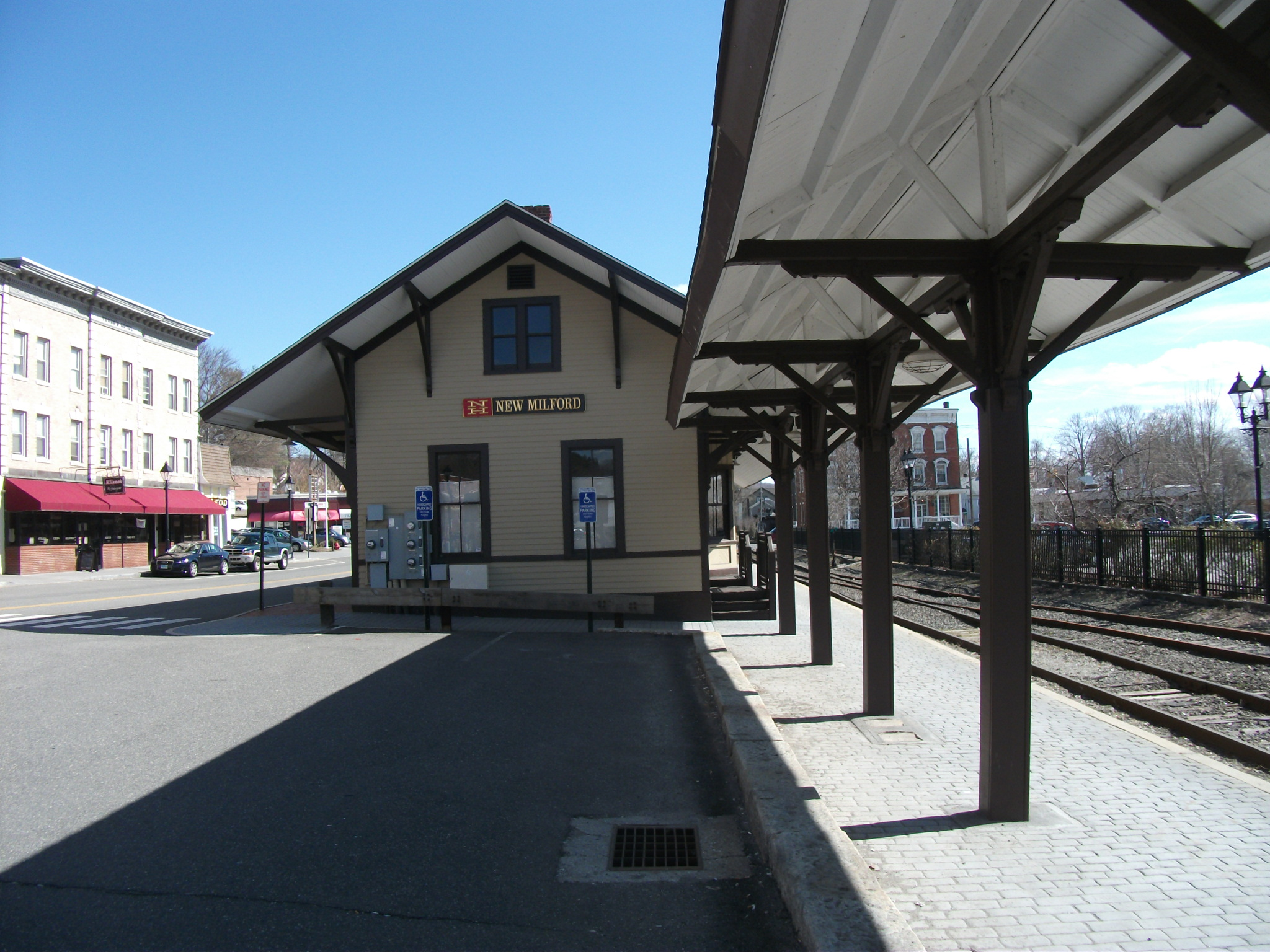
- The former New Milford station in 2010

General information
- Owner: ConnDOT
- Line: Housatonic Railroad
- Tracks: 2

History
- Opened: 1886; 140 years ago
- Closed: 1971; 55 years ago

Proposed services
Preceding station	Metro-North Railroad	Following station
Brookfield toward South Norwalk, Stamford or Grand Central	Danbury Branch	Terminus

Former services
Preceding station	New York, New Haven and Hartford Railroad	Following station
Brookfield toward Norwalk and South Norwalk	Pittsfield Branch	Gaylordsville toward Pittsfield
- New Milford Railroad Station
- U.S. National Register of Historic Places
- Location: 11 Railroad Street, New Milford, Connecticut
- Coordinates: 41°34′35″N 73°24′46″W
- Area: 1 acre (0.40 ha)
- Built: 1886; 140 years ago
- Architect: Housatonic Railroad Company
- Architectural style: Victorian
- NRHP reference No.: 84001062
- Added to NRHP: March 1, 1984
Location

New Milford station is a former railroad station on Railroad Street in New Milford, Connecticut. Built in 1886 by the Housatonic Railroad Company, it cemented the town's importance as a regional tourist and business center. It served passenger service until 1971, and is now home to the Greater New Milford chamber of commerce. It was listed on the National Register of Historic Places in 1984.

== History ==
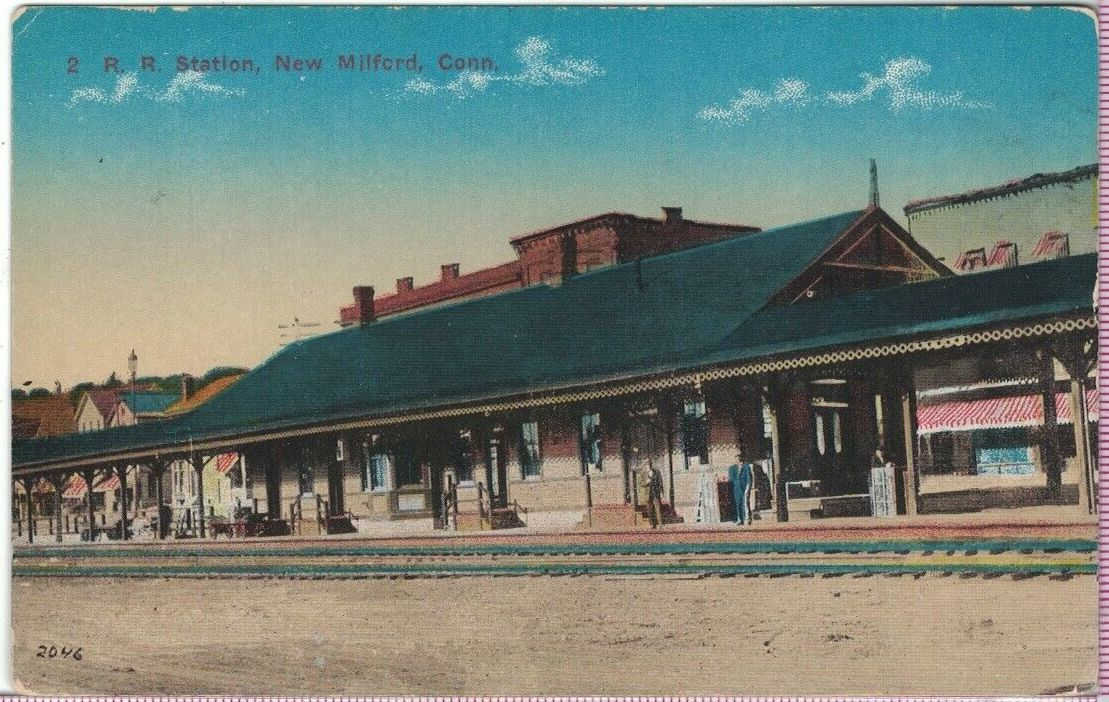
Early-20th-century postcard of the station

The station was built in 1886 by the Housatonic Railroad, then at the height of its operations. New Milford was also going through an economic boom, both as a center of regional tourism, and as the principal location for the processing and packing of tobacco in the Housatonic River valley. The railroad was later acquired by the New York, New Haven and Hartford Railroad. Passenger service, particularly tourist-related summer business, continued into the 1950s, but declined thereafter, and was ended in 1970. The station building, closed in the late 1960s, stood vacant for a time, but has since been rehabilitated and is now occupied by the New Milford chamber of commerce.

The station is located on the west side of New Milford's downtown business district, with Railroad Street to its east and the tracks of the Housatonic Railroad to the west. It is a long and narrow wood-frame building with a gable roof and clapboarded exterior. The street facade is regular, with windows and doors alternating, and a central projecting bay. Opposite this bay on the track side is a similar projection, which historically housed the ticketing office. The gabled roof has extended eaves, supported by large triangular brackets with decorative jigsawn woodwork on their interior. The track side eave is further extended to provide shelter over the passenger platform, with original cast iron supporting posts.

=== Proposed service ===
Local and state officials in Connecticut have proposed the extension of the Danbury Branch to New Milford Station along with possible electrification. There is no set timeline yet.
