= E. A. Wildman & Co. Tobacco Warehouse =

- U.S. National Register of Historic Places
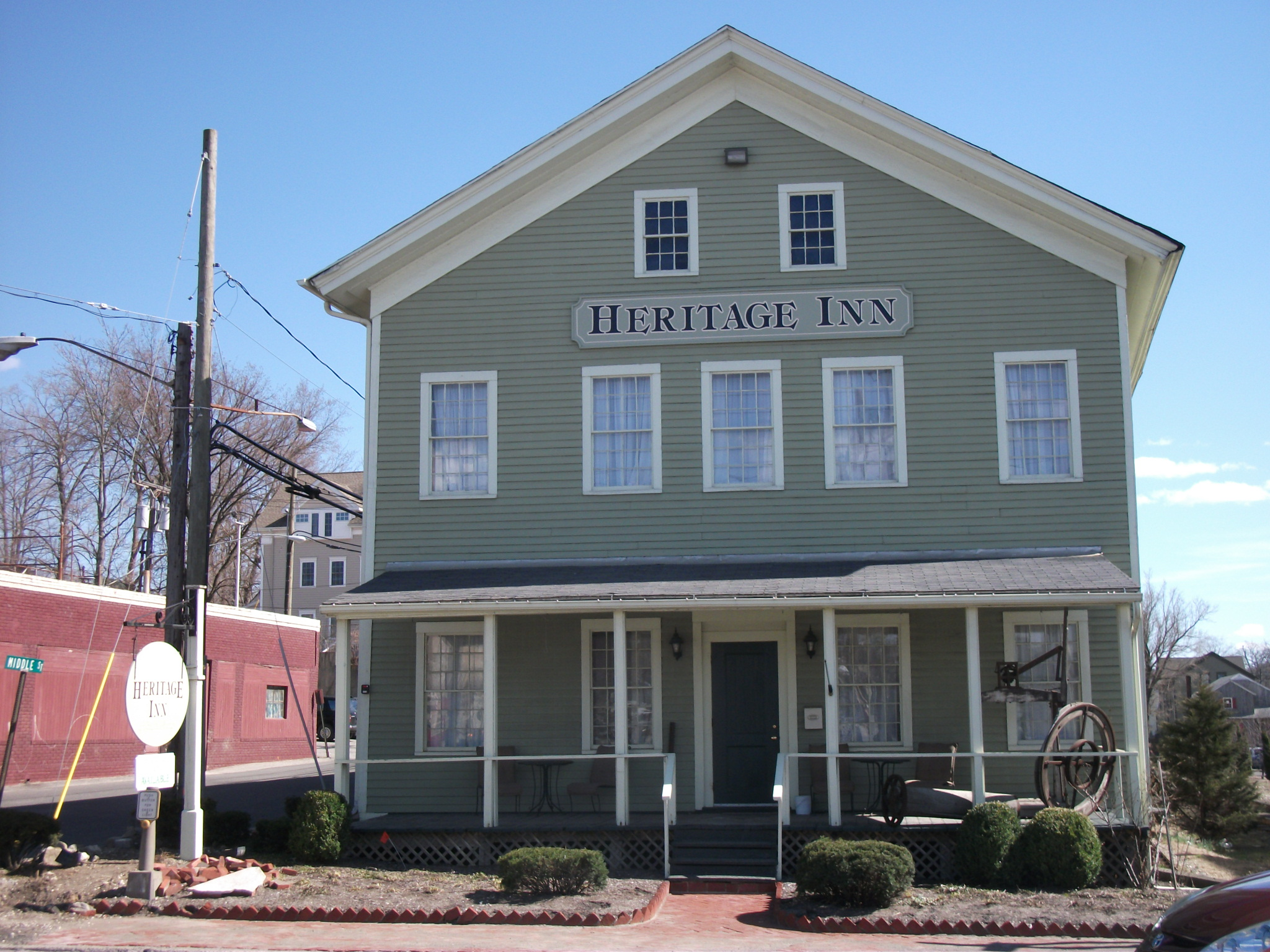

- Location within Connecticut Location within the United States
- Location: 34 Bridge Street, U.S. Route 202 New Milford, Connecticut
- Coordinates: 41°34′35″N 73°24′43″W
- Area: 0.2 acres (0.081 ha)
- Built: 1870
- Architectural style: Mid-19th century post & beam
- NRHP reference No.: 88000731
- Added to NRHP: October 20, 1988

The E.A. Wildman & Co. Tobacco Warehouse is a historic commercial/industrial building at 34 Bridge Street U.S. Route 202 in New Milford, Connecticut. Built in 1870, it is the oldest of the surviving tobacco warehouses in the town, which was a major tobacco processing center in the region. The building was listed on the National Register of Historic Places in 1988. The building has most recently served as a hotel.

== Description and history ==
The Wildman Tobacco Warehouse is a 2-1/2 story frame structure standing on the south side of Bridge Street in central New Milford, between Middle Street and the tracks of the Housatonic Railroad. It is long (167 feet (51 m)), with three sections. The front two, a total of sixteen bays long, were built on site, while the rear four bays are an originally separate warehouse that was moved to the site in 1901. This rear section is an extremely rare example of a rural packing barn. The building has a five-bay facade, with a single-story shed-roof porch across its width, and the entrance at the center.

The warehouse's front section was built in 1870, the early period in the region's development as a tobacco growing area. By World War I, New Milford was a major producer of cigar wrapping tobacco leaf, and supported twelve packing and warehousing operations. The Wildman Warehouse was one of the first to be built by a commercial packer, where earlier leaf packing operations had typically been run by farmers. Edward Wildman was a native of Brookfield, who served as agent to a major tobacco firm based in New York City. His warehouse was expanded in 1874, and again in 1901 after a surge in production. The building remained in use for tobacco production until about 1950.

== See also ==
- National Register of Historic Places listings in Litchfield County, Connecticut
