= 21st century in the United States =

The 21st century in the United States refers to the period in the United States from 2001 through 2100 in the Gregorian calendar. For articles on this period, see:

- History of the United States series:
  - History of the United States (1991–2016)
  - History of the United States (2016–present)
