= Lower Merryall, Connecticut =

Rural community in New Milford, Connecticut, United States

- Unincorporated village
- Location in Connecticut Location in the United States
- Coordinates: 41°38′48.34″N 73°24′56.44″W
- Country: United States
- U.S. state: Connecticut
- County: Litchfield
- Town: New Milford

Lower Merryall, otherwise referred to as just Merryall, is a rural community in the town of New Milford, Litchfield County, Connecticut, United States.

== History ==
The name "Merryall" was given to the land in 1726 by a group of surveyors, after having dinner by a spring and sharing a bottle of spirits. With the contents of the bottle, all had become merry and the land was named accordingly.

The district was originally established as Merryall but was later divided into Upper Merryall and Lower Merryall. However, they are often grouped as a single Merryall.

=== Historical sites ===
- Merryall Union Evangelical Society Chapel 1890
- Lower Merryall Schoolhouse (1759 – 1937)
- Cobble Hill Farm
- West Meetinghouse Cemetery
- Smyrski Farm
- The Merryall Community Center – the former Aspetuck Valley Grange, established as a community arts center in 1952

== Geography ==
Lower Merryall is made of farmland and forests. Conservation groups like the Friends and Neighbors of Historic Merryall have preserved the rural culture despite the rapid growth in other areas of New Milford.

The total land area of Lower Merryall is debatable however, the Merryall district as a whole (including Upper Merryall) has a total land area of 11.4 square miles (30 km^{2}), making up the northeast corner of New Milford.

The West Aspetuck River is Lower Merryall's primary waterway, running through the center of the community.

The highest point in elevation in Lower Merryall is Bear Hill (1,281 ft).

== Notable people ==
- Candice Bergen – American actress
- Diane von Fürstenberg – Belgian fashion designer
- Eartha Kitt – American singer and actress
- Orange Merwin – United States House representative
- Eric Sloane – American landscape painter, illustrator, and author
