= Lanesville, Connecticut =

Unincorporated area in New Milford, Connecticut, United States

- Unincorporated area
- Location in Connecticut Location in the United States
- Coordinates: 41°32′8.34″N 73°25′22.44″W
- Country: United States
- U.S. state: Connecticut
- County: Litchfield
- Town: New Milford

Lanesville is an unincorporated area in the town of New Milford, Litchfield County, Connecticut, United States.

== History ==
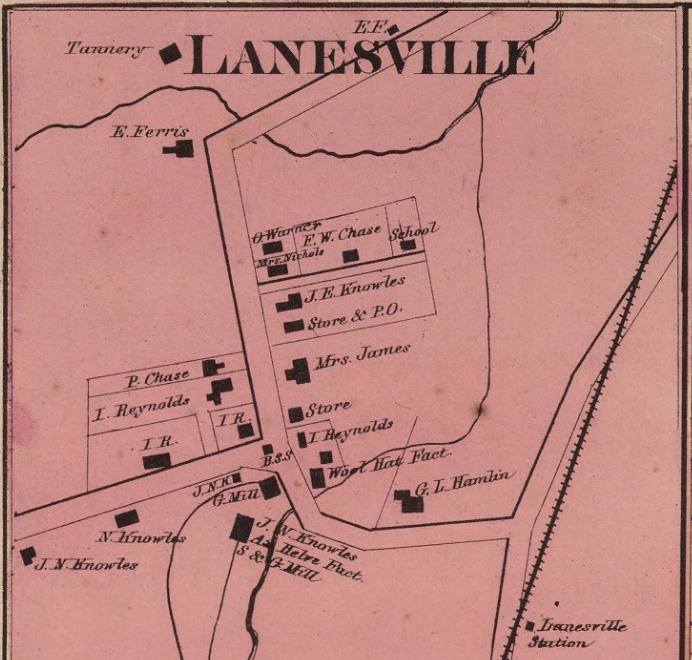
1867 New Milford Map - Lanesville inset

The establishment of what we now consider Lanesville is marked by the construction of the area's first gristmill, on the Still River in 1717. For a time, the area was known as Pleasant Valley but was eventually named Lanesville after prominent resident Jared Lane. In the nineteenth century, Lanesville was a well-known district with a post office, one-room schoolhouse, and railroad depot.

== Geography ==
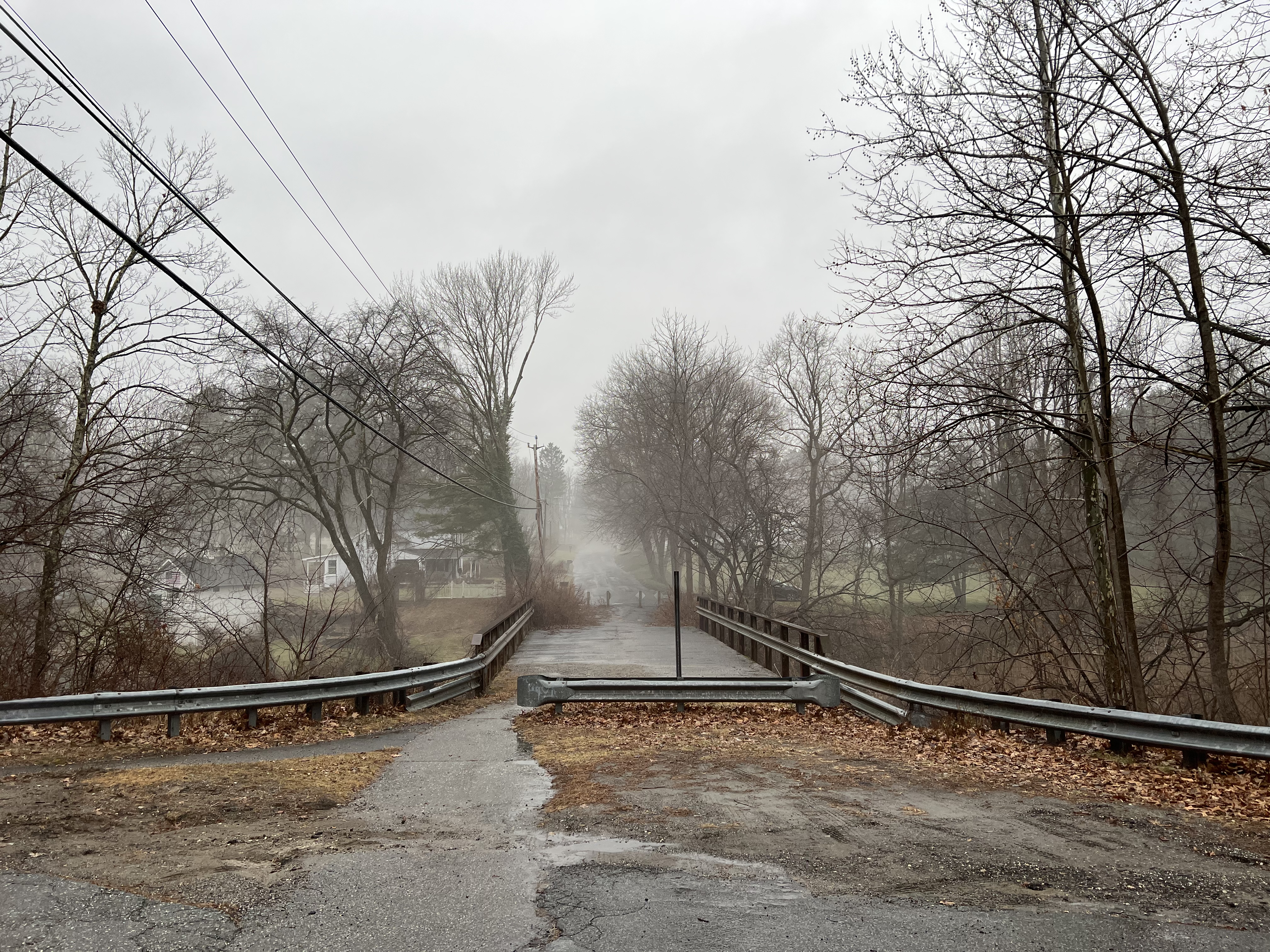
Bridge to Lanesville closed from Franks Lane

There has been limited access to the area since 2008, when the town closed off Lanesville Road from US Route 7. This closure pleased the residents of Lanesville but left businesses struggling. The area is now almost completely residential as a result. Traffic is also blocked on the other end of Lanesville Road, where there are barriers to the bridge connecting Lanesville with Franks Lane and Harrybrook Park.

== Parks and recreation ==
- Harrybrook Park
- Lovers Leap State Park
