= Hunt Hill Farm =

- Hine–Buckingham Farms
- U.S. National Register of Historic Places
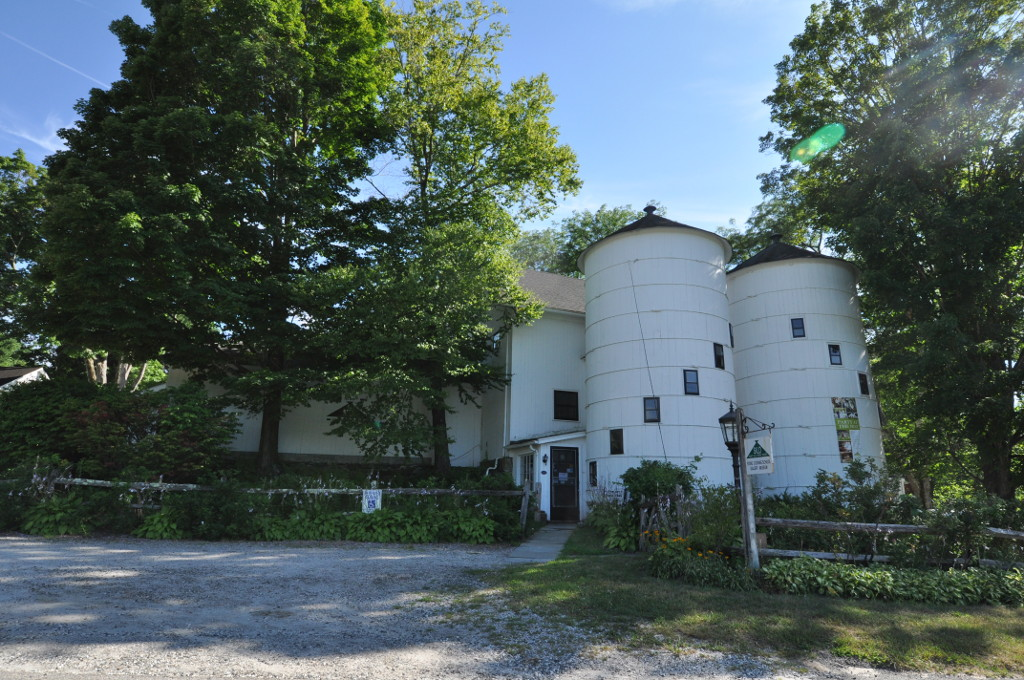

- Location within Connecticut Location within the United States
- Location: 44,46, 48 Upland Road, 78,81 Crossman Road, New Milford, Connecticut
- Coordinates: 41°38′18″N 73°22′57″W
- Area: 137 acres (55 ha)
- Architectural style: Colonial, Greek Revival
- NRHP reference No.: 04000413
- Added to NRHP: May 7, 2004

The Hunt Hill Farm is a historic farm property at Upland and Crossman Roads in New Milford, Connecticut. Also known as the Hine–Buckingham Farms, the 137-acre (55 ha) property encompasses two farm properties that remained family-run from the 18th to early 20th centuries. The property includes one 18th and several 19th-century farmhouses and other outbuildings. It was listed on the National Register of Historic Places in 2004. The farmstead is now home to The Silo at Hunt Hill Farm, an arts and culinary organization, while much of the land is held as conservation land by the town.

== Description and history ==
Hunt Hill Farm is located in a rural setting about 4 miles (6.4 km) North of New Milford Center, in the uplands on the east side of the East Aspetuck River. Its lands area combination of open fields and woodland, with the cluster of farm buildings set around the Junction of Upland and Crossman Roads. It includes three houses, built roughly between 1760 and 1836, as well as several barns, stables, and other outbuildings. A prominent feature of the complex is a pair of circular silos, set close to the road Junction in front of one of the barns.

The history of these farm properties dates to the early 18th century, and the earliest period of New Milford's settlement. Daniel Hine, a native Milford, settled in New Milford in 1737, and soon had a farm established here. Abel Buckingham began farming land adjacent to Hines's in 1775. The oldest of the three surviving houses was built about 1760 by Daniel Hines. By the mid-19th century, both families were engaged in dairy farming, sending their products to market via the Housatonic Railroad. The Hines farm was sold out of the family in 1908, while that of the Buckinghams remained in that family until 1972, when it was sold to the Hendersons. The Hines farm was purchased by the Hendersons in 1968, and the combined property was adapted by them to its present use as a culinary school and arts center.

== See also ==
- National Register of Historic Places listings in Litchfield County, Connecticut
