= Northwest Harwinton, Connecticut =

Census-designated place in Connecticut, United States

- Census-designated place
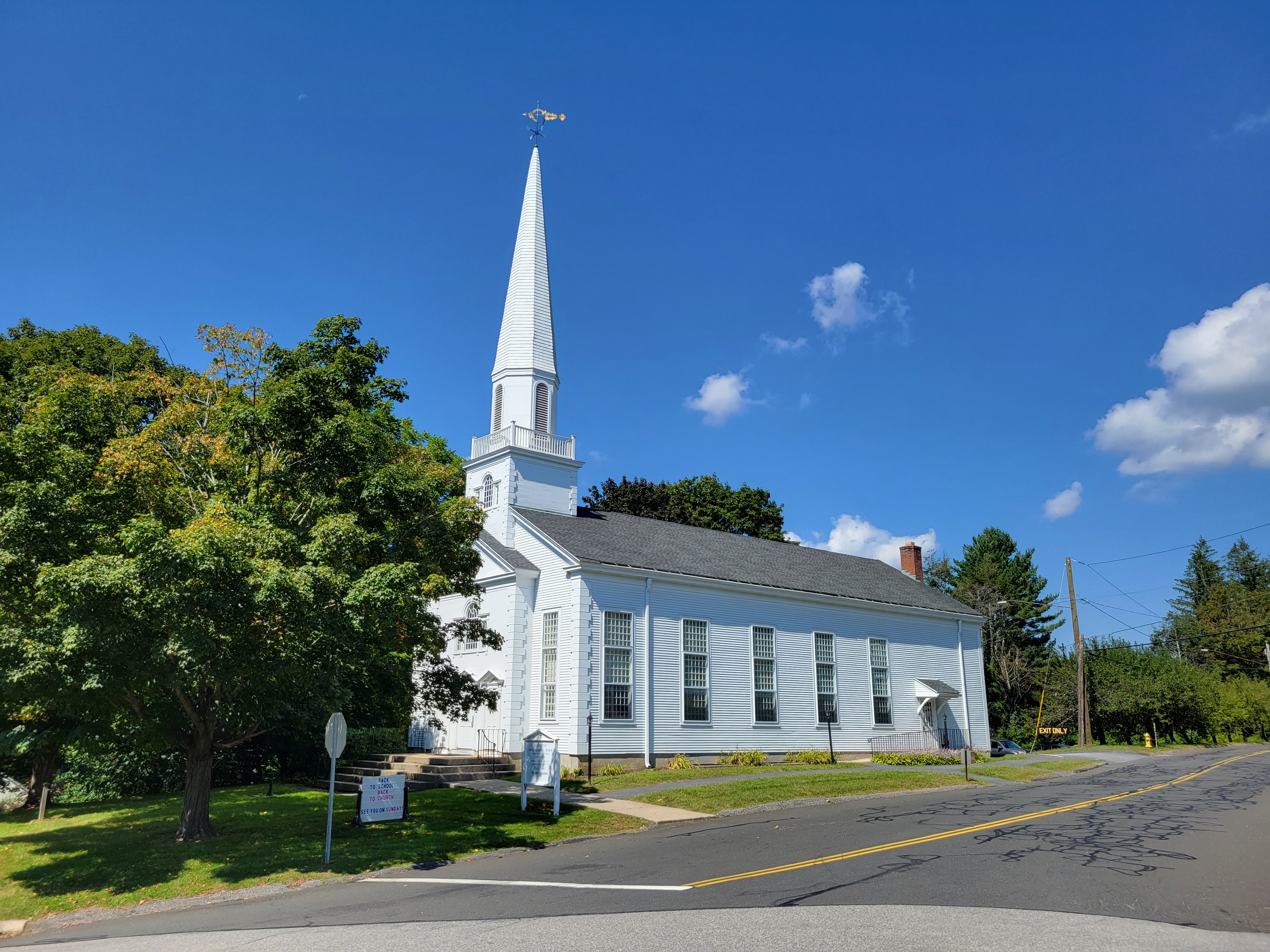
- Harwinton Congregational Church

- Location in Litchfield County, Connecticut
- Coordinates: 41°46′16″N 73°3′36″W
- State: Connecticut
- County: Litchfield
- Town: Harwinton

Area
  - Total: 8.8 sq mi (22.8 km^{2})
  - Land: 8.7 sq mi (22.5 km^{2})
  - Water: 0.12 sq mi (0.3 km^{2})
- Elevation: 820 ft (250 m)

Population (2020)
  - Total: 3,158
  - Density: 374/sq mi (144.3/km^{2})
- ZIP Code: 06791
- FIPS code: 09-55725
- GNIS feature ID: 2377844

Northwest Harwinton is a census-designated place (CDP) in the town of Harwinton in Litchfield County, Connecticut, United States. The population was 3,158 at the 2020 census, out of 5,484 in the entire town. The CDP contains the town center.

== Geography ==
The CDP occupies the northwestern quarter of the town of Harwinton, bordered to the north by the town of New Hartford, to the northwest by the city of Torrington, and to the west by the town of Litchfield. The southern edge of the CDP follows Connecticut Route 118 (Litchfield Road) west of Route 222 (Hill Road), and Delay Road, Swimming Hole Road, and Shingle Mill Road east of Route 222. The eastern edge of the CDP follows Plymouth Road, Harmony Hill Road, and North Road. The CDP includes the Harwinton town center at the intersection of Routes 118 and 4, as well as the residential community surrounding Lake Harwinton.

Route 4 leads east 20 miles (32 km) to West Hartford and northwest 5 miles (8 km) to Torrington, while Route 118 leads west 8 miles (13 km) to Litchfield borough, and Route 222 leads south 7 miles (11 km) to Thomaston.

According to the U.S. Census Bureau, the Northwest Harwinton CDP has a total area of 8.8 square miles (22.8 km^{2}), of which 8.7 square miles (22.5 km^{2}) are land and 0.1 square miles (0.3 km^{2}), or 1.25%, are water. The Naugatuck River forms the western edge of the CDP and the town of Harwinton.

== Demographics ==
=== 2020 census ===
As of the 2020 census, Northwest Harwinton had a population of 3,158. The median age was 48.0 years. 20.1% of residents were under the age of 18 and 22.7% of residents were 65 years of age or older. For every 100 females there were 103.6 males, and for every 100 females age 18 and over there were 104.7 males age 18 and over.

54.2% of residents lived in urban areas, while 45.8% lived in rural areas.

There were 1,301 households in Northwest Harwinton, of which 28.2% had children under the age of 18 living in them. Of all households, 58.6% were married-couple households, 15.5% were households with a male householder and no spouse or partner present, and 19.5% were households with a female householder and no spouse or partner present. About 22.6% of all households were made up of individuals and 10.7% had someone living alone who was 65 years of age or older.

There were 1,397 housing units, of which 6.9% were vacant. The homeowner vacancy rate was 0.8% and the rental vacancy rate was 0.9%.

Racial composition as of the 2020 census
| Race | Number | Percent |
|---|---|---|
| White | 2,912 | 92.2% |
| Black or African American | 24 | 0.8% |
| American Indian and Alaska Native | 9 | 0.3% |
| Asian | 23 | 0.7% |
| Native Hawaiian and Other Pacific Islander | 0 | 0.0% |
| Some other race | 9 | 0.3% |
| Two or more races | 181 | 5.7% |
| Hispanic or Latino (of any race) | 97 | 3.1% |

=== 2010 census ===
As of the census of 2010, there were 3,252 people, 1,307 households, and 980 families residing in the CDP. The population density was 374 inhabitants per square mile (144/km^{2}). There were 1,386 housing units, of which 79, or 5.7%, were vacant. The racial makeup of the CDP was 97.4% White, 0.3% African American, 0.1% Native American, 1.0% Asian, 0.1% Native Hawaiian or Pacific Islander, 0.2% some other race, and 1.0% from two or more races. Hispanic or Latino of any race were 1.6% of the population.

Of the 1,307 households in the community, 32.4% had children under the age of 18 living with them, 61.4% were headed by married couples living together, 8.9% had a female householder with no husband present, and 25.0% were non-families. 21.7% of all households were made up of individuals, and 10.3% were someone living alone who was 65 years of age or older. The average household size was 2.48, and the average family size was 2.87.

22.4% of the CDP population were under the age of 18, 5.7% were from 18 to 24, 20.7% were from 25 to 44, 33.4% were from 45 to 64, and 17.9% were 65 years of age or older. The median age was 45.8 years. For every 100 females, there were 99.9 males. For every 100 females age 18 and over, there were 96.0 males.

=== Income and poverty ===
For the period 2013–17, the estimated median income for a household in the CDP was $100,863, and the median income for a family was $110,357. The per capita income for the CDP was $41,424. Male full-time workers had a median income of $72,321 compared with $46,563 for females. 3.8% of families and 7.4% of the total population were living below the poverty line, including 18.5% of people under 18 and 5.7% of those over 64.

Historical population
| Census | Pop. | Note | %± |
|---|---|---|---|
| 2010 | 3,252 | | — |
| 2020 | 3,158 | | −2.9% |
sources 2010-2020

== Education ==
It is in the Regional School District 10.
