= Connecticut Route 73 =

State highway in Connecticut, US

Route 73
- Watertown Avenue
- Map of western Connecticut with Route 73 highlighted in red

Route information
- Maintained by CTDOT
- Length: 3.46 mi (5.57 km)
- Existed: 1932–present

Major junctions
- West end: Route 63 in Watertown
- East end: Route 8 in Waterbury

Location
- Country: United States
- State: Connecticut
- Counties: Litchfield, New Haven

Highway system
- Connecticut State Highway System; Interstate; US; State; SSR; SR; Scenic
← Route 72	→ Route 74

Route 73 is an east–west state highway in Connecticut connecting the town center of Watertown to the Route 8 expressway in Waterbury via the village of Oakville. The road is classified as an urban principal arterial road and carries traffic volumes of about 16,400 vehicles per day.

== Route description ==
Route 73 begins at an intersection with Route 63 in the town center of Watertown. It begins as Main Street, splitting off to the east from Route 63. It travels east southeast, crossing over Steele Brook, into the Oakville section of town. In Oakville, it has a junction with Buckingham Street, an unsigned state road linking Route 73 to Route 262. Route 73 soon enters the city limits of Waterbury as Watertown Avenue, crossing over Steele Brook again. East of the intersection with Irvington Avenue, Route 73 widens to four lanes. After about 0.2 miles (0.32 km), Route 73 leaves Watertown Avenue and becomes an expressway for its final 0.6-mile (0.97 km) length. Route 73 ends as it merges with Route 8 southbound.

== History ==
In 1922, the route between Watertown center and downtown Waterbury via the village of Oakville was designated as a secondary state highway known as State Highway 339. In the 1932 state highway renumbering, old Highway 339 was renumbered to Route 73. At that time, the Route 8 expressway had not yet been built and Route 73 had a slightly different alignment in Waterbury. Originally, Route 73 entered Waterbury on Watertown Avenue as it does today. However, east of Windsor Street, instead of heading directly onto the Route 8 expressway, Route 73 continued to follow Watertown Avenue southeast to West Main Street then turned east along West Main Street to end at the intersection with Thomaston Avenue, which was the original alignment of Route 8. In the 1960s, there were plans to build a short freeway connector between Route 8 in Waterbury and the Route 63/US 6 junction in Watertown. As part of this plan, a partial interchange was built for Route 73, which opened in 1968. Route 73 was soon relocated to the freeway approach and ramps. The original route into downtown Waterbury became an unsigned state highway with designation State Road 846. However, no additional construction or right of way acquisition has taken place since then and the Route 73 freeway had been removed from the state's long range transportation plans since the mid-1970s.

== Junction list ==
County	Location	mi	km	Destinations	Notes
Litchfield	Watertown	0.00	0.00	Route 63 – Middlebury, Litchfield	Western terminus
Litchfield	Watertown	1.20	1.93	Buckingham Street (SR 855 north)	
New Haven	Waterbury	2.85	4.59	Watertown Avenue (SR 846 south)	
New Haven	Waterbury	2.85	4.59	Western end of limited-access section	
New Haven	Waterbury	3.46	5.57	Route 8 south – Bridgeport	Eastern terminus; exit 31 on Route 8 north
1.000 mi = 1.609 km; 1.000 km = 0.621 mi
