= Connecticut Route 254 =

State highway in Litchfield County, Connecticut, US

Route 254
- Map of Litchfield County in northwestern Connecticut with Route 254 highlighted in red

Route information
- Maintained by CTDOT
- Length: 8.41 mi (13.53 km)
- Existed: 1963–present

Major junctions
- South end: US 6 / Route 8 in Thomaston
- North end: Route 118 in Litchfield

Location
- Country: United States
- State: Connecticut
- Counties: Litchfield

Highway system
- Connecticut State Highway System; Interstate; US; State; SSR; SR; Scenic
| ← Route 244 | → Route 262 |

Route 254 is a state highway in northwestern Connecticut running from Thomaston to Litchfield.

== Route description ==
Route 254 begins as a continuation of State Road 848 (Waterbury Road) at a northbound exit from Route 8 in Southeastern Thomaston. It heads north, crosses under the Route 8 expressway, and meets U.S. Route 6 at the point where eastbound US 6 joins northbound Route 8. Route 254 then continues north along South Main Street towards Thomaston center. In the town center, Route 254 then turns northwest along Northfield Road. Unsigned SR 807 continues north to connect to Route 222. Northfield Road follows the path of Northfield Brook into the town of Litchfield. In Litchfield, Route 254 soon enters the village of Northfield, then continues northwest for about 4.7 miles (7.6 km) to end at an intersection with Route 118 in the borough of Litchfield.

The section of Route 254 from Camp Hill Road in the village of Northfield to the northern terminus in Litchfield borough is designated as a state scenic road.

== History ==
Prior to 1963, the Thomaston-Northfield-Litchfield road was an unsigned state highway designated as State Road 854. As part of the 1962 Route Reclassification Act, SR 854 was renumbered to Route 254 at the beginning of 1963. In 1967, Route 254 was extended southward along South Main Street (former US 6) to the north end of SR 848. A 0.7-mile (1.1 km) section of the route (Litchfield Street) was relocated to a newly constructed two-lane road (southern end of modern Northfield Road) in 1970.

== Junction list ==
The entire route is in Litchfield County.

| Location | mi | km | Destinations | Notes |
|---|---|---|---|---|
| Thomaston | 0.00 | 0.00 | Waterbury Road (SR 848 south) | Continuation south |
| Thomaston | 0.18 | 0.29 | US 6 / Route 8 – Watertown, Waterbury, Torrington | Exit 38 on Route 8 |
| Thomaston | 0.27 | 0.43 | Watertown Road (SR 810 west) | |
| Thomaston | 1.07 | 1.72 | South Main Street (SR 807 north) | |
| Litchfield | 8.41 | 13.53 | Route 118 – Litchfield Center, Harwinton | Northern terminus |
1.000 mi = 1.609 km; 1.000 km = 0.621 mi
