= Connecticut Route 222 =

State highway in Litchfield County, Connecticut, US

Route 222
- Map of Litchfield County in northwestern Connecticut with Route 222 highlighted in red

Route information
- Maintained by CTDOT
- Length: 8.08 mi (13.00 km)
- Existed: 1963–present

Major junctions
- South end: US 6 / Route 8 in Thomaston
- Route 8 in Thomaston
- North end: Route 118 in Harwinton

Location
- Country: United States
- State: Connecticut
- Counties: Litchfield

Highway system
- Connecticut State Highway System; Interstate; US; State; SSR; SR; Scenic
← Route 220	→ Route 229

Route 222 is a state highway in west central Connecticut, running in a meandering pattern from Thomaston to Harwinton.

== Route description ==
Route 222 begins as East Main Street in the town center of Thomaston at the Exit 39 interchange of the Route 8 expressway, where eastbound US 6 leaves. It first heads west across the Naugatuck River, then turns north along North Main Street. Turning south on Main Street (unsigned State Road 807) leads to Route 254. Route 222 follows the west bank of the Naugatuck River northward, intersecting Route 8 at Exit 40 after 0.7 miles (1.1 km). After another 0.3 miles (0.48 km), it turns east to cross the Naugatuck River again along Hill Road. Hill Road continues northeast until it reaches the Plymouth town line. In Plymouth, it curves northward just east of the town line before reentering Thomaston. It then crosses the northeast corner of Thomaston into Harwinton and loops westward briefly back and forth across the town line back into Thomaston and again into Harwinton. In Harwinton, it continues north-northwest for another 4.3 miles (6.9 km) until it ends at an intersection with Route 118 west of the town center.

== History ==
Route 222 was commissioned in 1963, partially from parts of the pre-expressway alignment of Route 8 in Thomaston (North Main Street) and former SR 722 (Hill Road) in Harwinton. It has had no major changes since.

== Junction list ==
The entire route is in Litchfield County.

Location	mi	km	Destinations	Notes
Thomaston	0.00	0.00	US 6 / Route 8 – Plymouth, Watertown	Southern terminus; exit 39 on Route 8
Thomaston			South Main Street (SR 807 south)	
Thomaston	1.11	1.79	Route 8 north – Torrington	Exit 40 on Route 8 south
Harwinton	8.08	13.00	Route 118 – Litchfield, Harwinton, Hartford	Northern terminus
1.000 mi = 1.609 km; 1.000 km = 0.621 mi
