= Reynolds Bridge =

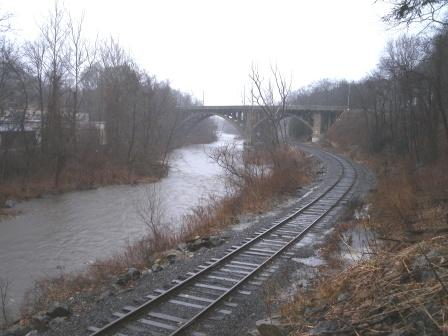
- View from south
- Coordinates: 41°39′11″N 73°4′37″W
- Reynolds Bridge
- U.S. National Register of Historic Places
- Area: less than one acre
- Built: 1928
- Architect: Connecticut Highway Department; Haggerty, Charles A.
- Architectural style: open-spandrel concrete arch
- NRHP reference No.: 04001095
- Added to NRHP: September 29, 2004
- Carries: State Road 848 (Waterbury Road)
- Crosses: Naugatuck River
- Locale: Thomaston, Connecticut
- Official name: Bridge No. 603
- Maintained by: Connecticut Department of Transportation

Characteristics
- Total length: 148.7 m (488 ft)

Statistics
- Daily traffic: 3,100

Location
- Interactive map of Reynolds Bridge

The Reynolds Bridge in Thomaston, Connecticut is an open-spandrel concrete arch bridge carrying Waterbury Road (unsigned State Road 848) over the Naugatuck River. Built in 1928, it is one of a small number of surviving open-spandrel bridges in the state. It was listed on the National Register of Historic Places in 2004.

== Description and history ==
The Reynolds Bridge is located roughly midway between Waterbury and the town center of Thomaston, just east of Connecticut Route 8's Exit 38. It is oriented northwest-southeast, and spans the Naugatuck River, the active railroad of the Naugatuck Railroad, which run along the river's east bank, and a former right-of-way of a streetcar line which ran along the river's west bank. The bridge is a three-arch open spandrel concrete structure, with four concrete beam approach spans on either side. The main span is 169 feet (52 m) long, while the secondary arches are each 97 feet (30 m); the bridge has a total length of 487 feet (148 m). The arches are joined by crossing struts, and vertical columns rise from the arch to support the road deck. The deck has a width of 42 feet (13 m), with the sidewalks cantilevered outside the supporting arches.

At the time of its construction in 1928, the state used open-spandrel design was used for the longest concrete bridge crossings, and this was the longest designed by the Connecticut State Highway Department up to that time. The Cornwall Bridge, built a few years later over the Housatonic River, has a longer span. At the time of its National Register listing in 2004, it was one of six open-spandrel bridges in the state.

== See also ==
- National Register of Historic Places listings in Litchfield County, Connecticut
- List of bridges on the National Register of Historic Places in Connecticut
