= Connecticut Route 262 =

State highway in Connecticut, US

Route 262
- Map of Western Connecticut with Route 262 highlighted in red

Route information
- Maintained by CTDOT
- Length: 9.37 mi (15.08 km)
- Existed: March 1963–present

Major junctions
- South end: US 6 in Watertown
- Route 8 in Watertown
- North end: US 6 in Plymouth

Location
- Country: United States
- State: Connecticut
- Counties: Litchfield, New Haven

Highway system
- Connecticut State Highway System; Interstate; US; State; SSR; SR; Scenic
← Route 254	→ Route 263

Route 262 is a state highway in west central Connecticut running in a "U" pattern from Watertown to Plymouth.

== Route description ==
Route 262 begins at an intersection with US 6 in Watertown. It heads southeast and east to Route 8, turning north and intersecting Route 8 before crossing the Naugatuck River into Thomaston. In Thomaston, it Continues South along the Naugatuck River to Waterbury. It briefly curves East just South of the Thomaston–Waterbury Town line before turning North into Plymouth. In Plymouth, it heads north past the Waterbury Airport and Lake Plymouth before ending at another intersection with US 6 in Plymouth.

== History ==
Route 262 was commissioned in March 1963 from South Street (old SR 862, which became a state road in 1959) and its southward continuation along Spruce Brook Road (which became state-maintained in 1962). It originally ran from Waterbury Road (modern SR 848) in Thomaston to US 6 in Plymouth. In 1964, with the opening of the Route 8 freeway from Waterbury to Thomaston, Route 262 was extended south along the former route of Route 8 to Huntingdon Avenue in Waterbury. In 1965, it was truncated back to Spruce Brook Road in Waterbury. In 1975, the Watertown section of Route 262 was added, using former SR 824 (newly constructed road from Buckingham Street to Frost Bridge Road in 1970) and SR 855 (Buckingham Street). In the same year, the section between Lake Plymouth and Tomlinson Road in Plymouth was realigned.

== Junction list ==
County	Location	mi	km	Destinations	Notes
Litchfield	Watertown	0.00	0.00	US 6 – Watertown, Thomaston	Southern terminus
Litchfield	Watertown			Buckingham Street (SR 855 south)	
Litchfield	Watertown	2.89	4.65	Route 8 south – Waterbury	Exit 34 on Route 8 north
Litchfield	Watertown			Route 8 north – Torrington	Exit 34 on Route 8 south
Litchfield	Thomaston			Waterbury Road (SR 848 north)	
New Haven	Waterbury			Thomaston Avenue (SR 847 south)	
Litchfield	Plymouth	9.37	15.08	US 6 – Thomaston, Terryville, Bristol	Northern terminus
1.000 mi = 1.609 km; 1.000 km = 0.621 mi
