= Connecticut Route 8 =

Highway in Connecticut

Route 8
- Route 8 highlighted in red

Route information
- Maintained by CTDOT
- Length: 67.36 mi (108.41 km)
- Existed: 1922–present

Major junctions
- South end: I-95 / Route 25 in Bridgeport
- US 1 in Bridgeport; Route 25 in Bridgeport; Route 108 / Route 15 / Merritt Parkway in Trumbull; Route 34 in Derby; I-84 in Waterbury; US 6 / Route 254 in Thomaston; US 202 / Route 4 in Torrington; US 44 / Route 183 in Winsted; Route 20 in Winchester
- North end: Route 8 at the Massachusetts state line near Colebrook

Location
- Country: United States
- State: Connecticut
- Counties: Fairfield, New Haven, Litchfield

Highway system
- Connecticut State Highway System; Interstate; US; State; SSR; SR; Scenic
← US 7	→ Route 9

Route 8 is a 67.36-mile (108.41 km) state highway in Connecticut that runs north–south from Bridgeport, through Waterbury, all the way to the Massachusetts state line where it continues as Massachusetts Route 8. Most of the highway is a four-lane freeway but the northernmost 8.8 miles (14.2 km) is a two-lane surface road.

== Route description ==
Route 8 begins at Interstate 95 (I-95) in Bridgeport. The first 3.75 miles (6.04 km) through Bridgeport runs concurrently with the freeway portion of Route 25. Approaching the split between Routes 8 and 25, the road expands to six, eight, and even ten lanes. Route 8 continues northeastward into Trumbull where there is an interchange with Route 15 (Merritt Parkway).

From Trumbull, it briefly enters Stratford before entering Shelton passing by several exits providing access to business parks. It then crosses the Housatonic River and continues into Derby. After the Route 34 interchange, the road takes on more of a semi-rural character as it winds its way along the Naugatuck River through the towns of Ansonia, Seymour, and Beacon Falls before it becomes more suburban in nature in Naugatuck and then more urban as it enters Waterbury. In Waterbury, Route 8 meets with I-84 at the interchange known locally as the "Mixmaster". After the Route 73 interchange, the road returns to its winding semi-rural nature, passing through Watertown and Thomaston. In the latter city, U.S. Route 6 (US 6) briefly overlaps for about a mile. The highway then continues through Litchfield and Harwinton. After a brief suburban section through Torrington where it intersects US 202 and Route 4, it returns to a rural freeway before entering the town of Winchester.

The freeway section of Route 8 ends at US 44 and Route 183 in Winsted. After a short 0.33-mile (0.53 km) northwesterly overlap with US 44 and Route 183, Route 8 continues north as a mostly rural surface road. It intersects the western end of Route 20 on the northern edge of town, and continues through Colebrook to the Massachusetts state line, becoming Massachusetts Route 8 upon entering Sandisfield.

The section from I-95 to the Route 25 split is also known as the Colonel Henry Mucci Highway (designation continues on Route 25). The section from Shelton to Beacon Falls is known as the General Samuel Jaskilka Highway. The section from Constitution Boulevard in Shelton to Route 334 at the Seymour–Ansonia town line is known as the Ansonia–Derby–Shelton Expressway. The section from Waterbury to the freeway end in Winchester is known as the James H. Darcey Memorial Highway.

== History ==

Most of the alignment of Route 8 was part of an improved toll road known as the Waterbury River Turnpike, which ran from Naugatuck, via Torrington, Winchester Center and Colebrook Center, to the Massachusetts state line. The turnpike was chartered in 1801 and collected tolls until 1862. Two other sections of Route 8 were also old turnpikes: the portion north of Torrington was known as the Still River Turnpike chartered in 1815; the portion between Seymour and Naugatuck was known as the Humphreysville and Salem Turnpike chartered in 1825.

In 1922, the six New England states began a region-wide highway numbering system. The trunk highway from Stratford through Waterbury to the Massachusetts state line became part of the multi-state New England Route 8. Route 8 remained unchanged in the 1932 state highway renumbering. The main road connecting Bridgeport and Shelton (following Noble Avenue, Huntington Turnpike, Shelton Road, Bridgeport Avenue, and Center Street), which was designated as State Highway 316 in 1922, was renumbered as Route 65 in the 1932 renumbering.

In 1951, the Ansonia–Derby–Shelton Expressway portion between Constitution Boulevard in Shelton and Pershing Drive in Derby (including the Commodore Isaac Hull Memorial Bridge) opened to traffic. As part of the freeway upgrades to Route 8, the southern terminus was shifted west from Stratford to Bridgeport, taking over old Route 65. The original southern end of Route 8 was assigned to an extended Route 110. By 1957, the entire length of the Ansonia–Derby–Shelton Expressway portion was open, with the extension from Pershing Drive to Route 334 at the Ansonia/Seymour town line complete.

In the 1960s and 1970s additional sections of the Route 8 freeway opened in stages: in 1960, the segment from Route 63 to South Main Street in Waterbury opened; in 1962, the section from Route 334 to Route 67, including the elevated highway portion through central Seymour, opened; in 1966, the Mixmaster interchange with I-84 is completed and the freeway was also extended to Route 262 in Watertown. An additional section from Route 118 in Litchfield to Kennedy Drive in Torrington also opened. By 1970, the portion from Route 262 in Watertown to Route 118 in Litchfield opened. By 1972, the segment from I-95 to Route 108 in Trumbull, including the overlap with Route 25, was completed. The freeway was also extended from Kennedy Drive in Torrington to its present terminus at Route 44 in Winsted. By 1975, the freeway was completed between Huntington Turnpike at the Trumbull/Shelton town line to Constitution Boulevard in Shelton.

The early 1980s saw the completion of the Route 8 freeway with the 4-lane surface route from Route 67 in Seymour to Route 63 in Naugatuck (originally built in the 1940s) upgraded to a freeway, including the portion that bypasses Beacon Falls. The original alignment of Route 8 through Beacon Falls became part of Route 42. The last segment of freeway between Route 108 in Trumbull and Huntington Turnpike, including a new interchange with the Merritt Parkway was completed in 1982. This constituted the completion of the freeway from Bridgeport to Winchester, 35 years after construction began.

=== Attempts at Interstate designation ===
The Route 8 freeway was envisioned to continue beyond its present northern terminus in Winsted to either Massachusetts or southern Vermont. In 1972, Massachusetts and Connecticut requested an interstate designation for the Route 8 corridor that included completed and yet-to-be-built sections in both states. That request was denied by the Federal Highway Administration.

In the ensuing 40 years, on-and-off discussions and engineering studies to designate Route 8 as an interstate route have continued, with the most recent study being completed in 2011. In that report, the study noted that not all of the Route 8 freeway meets interstate standards, particularly sections that were designed and built before the interstate highway era. Newer sections between Bridgeport and Shelton, around Beacon Falls, and from the I-84 interchange in Waterbury to Winsted were designed and built from the late 1960s to the early 1980s and either meet interstate standards or require minimal spot upgrades to meet interstate standards. The report noted the sections that do not meet interstate standards include the 8-mile segment from Shelton to Seymour, which was built in stages from the late 1940s through the early 1960s; and the 5-mile section through Naugatuck, which was built in the 1950s. Both of these segments include narrow cross-sections, tight curve radii, and closely spaced interchanges that do not meet current interstate standards. Because these segments wind their way through the urban centers of Shelton, Derby, Seymour and Naugatuck on elevated viaducts, upgrading (or bypassing) these segments would be costly and cause significant disruption to the surrounding communities.

== Junction list ==
CTDOT has not announced a renumbering schedule to mile-based exit numbers on Route 25. The "NEW EXIT NUMBERS" shown below are not confirmed, but potential numbers for when the switch to mile-based exit numbers does occur.

County	Location	mi	km	Old exit	New exit	Destinations	Notes
Fairfield	Bridgeport	0.00	0.00	–	1A-B	I-95 – New Haven, New York City Route 25 begins	Southern terminus; signed as exits 1A (I-95 north) & 1B (I-95 south); southern terminus of Route 25; exit 29A/C on I-95
Fairfield	Bridgeport	0.40	0.64	1	1C	Prospect Street / Myrtle Avenue	Southbound exit and northbound entrance
Fairfield	Bridgeport	0.80	1.29	2	1D	Route 130 (Fairfield Avenue)	Southbound exit and northbound entrance
Fairfield	Bridgeport	0.80	1.29	2	1	Golden Hill Street / Main Street	Northbound exit and southbound entrance
Fairfield	Bridgeport	1.44	2.32	3 4	2A	Main Street / Washington Avenue	Southbound exit and northbound entrance
Fairfield	Bridgeport	2.21	3.56	3 4	2A	US 1 / Lindley Street	Northbound exit and southbound entrance; US 1 not signed
Fairfield	Bridgeport	2.80	4.51	5	2B	US 1 (Boston Avenue / North Avenue)	Access via SR 722
Fairfield	Bridgeport	3.75	6.04	6	3	Route 25 north to Route 15 south / Merritt Parkway south – Trumbull, New York City	Northbound exit and southbound entrance; northern end of Route 25 concurrency
Fairfield	Trumbull	4.17	6.71	7	4	Route 127 (East Main Street / White Plains Road)	Southbound exit and northbound entrance
Fairfield	Trumbull			8	5	To Route 108 – Stratford	Northbound exit only; access via Penny Avenue
Fairfield	Trumbull	5.46	8.79	8	5	Route 108 to Route 15 north / Merritt Parkway north – Stratford, New Haven	No northbound exit; exit 34 on Merritt Parkway
Fairfield	Trumbull	5.51– 6.25	8.87– 10.06	9 (NB); 10 (SB)	6	Route 15 / Merritt Parkway – New Haven, New York City	Same-directional access only; exit 34 on Merritt Parkway
Fairfield	Shelton	7.16	11.52	11	7	Huntington Road	No southbound exit
Fairfield	Shelton			11	7	Bridgeport Avenue (SR 714)	Southbound exit only
Fairfield	Shelton	9.19	14.79	12	9	Old Stratford Road	
Fairfield	Shelton	11.4	18.3	13	11	Bridgeport Avenue (SR 714) / Constitution Boulevard	Southbound exit and entrance
Fairfield	Shelton	11.47	18.46	13	11	Constitution Boulevard / Bridgeport Avenue (SR 714)	Northbound exit and entrance
Fairfield	Shelton	12.28	19.76	14	12A	Route 110 (Howe Avenue) – Shelton	
Housatonic River		12.28– 12.58	19.76– 20.25	Commodore Hull Bridge			
New Haven	Derby	12.84	20.66	15	12B	Route 34 – Derby, New Haven	Access to Derby-Shelton station
New Haven	Derby	13.40	21.57	16	13A	Pershing Drive (SR 727 north) – Ansonia	Northbound exit and southbound entrance
New Haven	Derby	13.68	22.02	17	13	Seymour Avenue	Signed as exit 13B southbound
New Haven	Derby	14.33	23.06	18	14	Division Street	No southbound exit
New Haven	Ansonia	15.79	25.41	19	15	Route 334 (Wakelee Avenue)	No southbound exit
New Haven	Ansonia			19	15	To Route 334 (Wakelee Avenue)	Southbound exit only; access via Derby Avenue
New Haven	Seymour	16.78	27.00	20 21	17	Derby Avenue	Southbound exit and northbound entrance
New Haven	Seymour	17.50	28.16	20 21	17	Derby Avenue (SR 728) to Route 67 – Oxford	Northbound exit and southbound entrance
New Haven	Seymour	18.68	30.06	22	18	Route 67 / Route 313 east – Seymour	Route 313 not signed
New Haven	Beacon Falls	21.09	33.94	23 24	21	Route 42 – Beacon Falls, Oxford	Northbound exit and southbound entrance
New Haven	Beacon Falls	22.35	35.97	23 24	21	To Route 42 – Beacon Falls, Oxford	Southbound exit and northbound entrance; access via North Main Street
New Haven	Naugatuck	24.09	38.77	25	24	Cross Street to Route 63	Route 63 not signed northbound
New Haven	Naugatuck	25.27	40.67	26	25A	Route 63 (South Main Street) – Bethany	Bethany not signed northbound
New Haven	Naugatuck	25.6	41.2	27	25B	Naugatuck	Southbound exit and northbound entrance; access via Maple Street
New Haven	Naugatuck	25.7	41.4	27	25B	Naugatuck	Northbound exit and southbound entrance; access via North Main Street
New Haven	Naugatuck			28	26	Route 68 – Union City, Prospect	Northbound exit and southbound entrance; access via SR 723
New Haven	Naugatuck	26.83	43.18	28	26	To Route 68 – Union City, Prospect	Southbound exit and northbound entrance; access via SR 710
New Haven	Naugatuck	27.31	43.95	29	27	South Main Street (SR 847 north) – Waterbury	Waterbury not signed southbound
New Haven	Waterbury			30	29	South Leonard Street / Washington Avenue	Northbound exit and southbound entrance
New Haven	Waterbury			30	29	Washington Avenue	Southbound exit and northbound entrance
New Haven	Waterbury	30.21– 30.38	48.62– 48.89	31-33	30	I-84 / Riverside Street – Hartford, Downtown Waterbury, Danbury	No northbound access to Riverside Street; signed as exits 30A (I-84 east), 30B (Riverside Street) & 30C (I-84 west); exits 32A & 32B on I-84
New Haven	Waterbury	30.64	49.31	34	30D	West Main Street (SR 846 south) – Downtown Waterbury	Southbound exit and northbound entrance
New Haven	Waterbury	31.22	50.24	35	31	Route 73 – Oakville, Watertown	Northbound exit and southbound entrance; southern terminus of Route 73
New Haven	Waterbury	32.61	52.48	36	32	Huntingdon Avenue / Colonial Avenue	Northbound exit and entrance
New Haven	Waterbury			36	32	Colonial Avenue / Huntington Avenue	Southbound exit only
Litchfield	Watertown	34.31	55.22	37	34	Route 262 – Watertown	Northbound exit and southbound entrance
Litchfield	Watertown			37	34	Route 262 – Watertown	Southbound exit and northbound entrance
Litchfield	Thomaston	38.24	61.54	38	38	US 6 west / Route 254 to Route 109 – Thomaston, Watertown	Watertown not signed northbound; Southern end of US 6 concurrency; southern terminus of Route 254;
Litchfield	Thomaston	39.70	63.89	39	39	US 6 east / Route 222 – Thomaston, Bristol, Plymouth, Terryville	Thomaston not signed southbound; Northern end of US 6 concurrency; southern terminus of Route 222
Litchfield	Thomaston	40.36	64.95	40	40	Route 222 (North Main Street)	Southbound exit and northbound entrance
Litchfield	Northfield	44.11	70.99	41	44	Northfield, Campville	Access via Campville Road
Litchfield	Litchfield	46.82	75.35	42	46	Route 118 – Litchfield, Harwinton	
Litchfield	Torrington			43	49	Harwinton Avenue	Northbound exit and entrance
Litchfield	Torrington			43	49	Harwinton Avenue	Southbound exit only
Litchfield	Torrington	49.93	80.35	44	50	US 202 / Route 4 – Downtown Torrington	
Litchfield	Torrington			45	51	Winsted Road (SR 800) to Kennedy Drive	Southbound exit and entrance
Litchfield	Torrington	51.81	83.38	45	51	Kennedy Drive / Winsted Road (SR 800)	Northbound exit and entrance
Litchfield	Torrington	55.55	89.40	46	55	Pinewoods Road – Burrville	
Litchfield	Winchester	58.51	94.16	Northern end of freeway section			
Litchfield	Winchester	58.51	94.16			US 44 east / Route 183 south – New Hartford	Southern end of US 44/Route 183 concurrency
Litchfield	Winchester	58.84	94.69			US 44 west / Route 183 north – Colebrook, Canaan	Northern end of US 44/Route 183 concurrency
Litchfield	Winchester	60.67	97.64			Route 20 east – Riverton	Western terminus of Route 20
Litchfield	Colebrook	67.36	108.41			Route 8 north – Sandisfield, Otis	Continuation into Massachusetts
1.000 mi = 1.609 km; 1.000 km = 0.621 mi: Concurrency terminus; Incomplete access
