= Oakville, Connecticut =

Census-designated place in Connecticut, United States

- Census-designated place
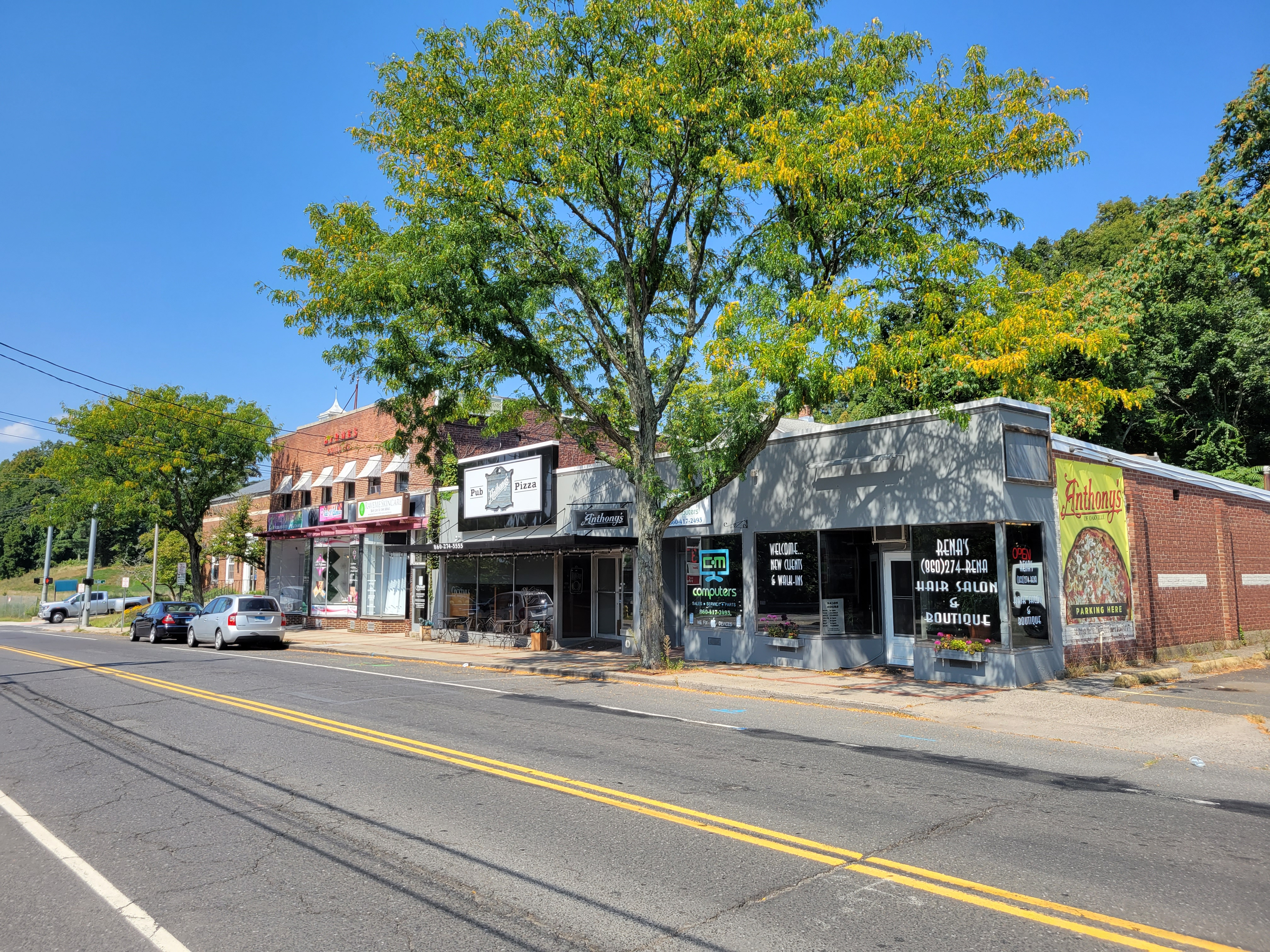
- Main Street

- Location in Litchfield County, Connecticut
- State: Connecticut
- County: Litchfield
- Town: Watertown

Area
  - Total: 3.28 sq mi (8.50 km^{2})
  - Land: 3.25 sq mi (8.41 km^{2})
  - Water: 0.035 sq mi (0.09 km^{2})
- Elevation: 395 ft (120 m)

Population (2020)
  - Total: 9,504
  - Density: 2,787/sq mi (1,075.9/km^{2})
- ZIP Code: 06779
- FIPS code: 09-56690
- GNIS feature ID: 209448

Oakville is a census-designated place (CDP) and neighborhood section of Watertown, in Litchfield County, Connecticut, United States. As of the 2020 census, Oakville had a population of 9,504. It is the most populous community in Watertown, with more than twice as many people as the center village of Watertown. The ZIP code for Oakville is 06779.

== Geography ==
Oakville is in the southeastern part of Watertown. It is bordered to the northwest by the village of Watertown and to the south by the city of Waterbury. The Route 8 freeway forms the eastern edge of Oakville, with access from a half-exit at Route 262. Oakville is 3 miles (5 km) north of Interstate 84 in Waterbury and 2 miles (3 km) southeast of Route 6.

According to the United States Census Bureau, the Oakville CDP has a total area of 3.3 square miles (8.5 km^{2}), of which 0.04 square miles (0.1 km^{2}), or 1.06%, are water. Steele Brook, a tributary of the Naugatuck River, flows through Oakville, with a dam in the center of town forming Pin Shop Pond.

== Demographics ==
=== Racial and ethnic composition ===
Oakville CDP, Connecticut – Racial composition Note: the US Census treats Hispanic/Latino as an ethnic category. This table excludes Latinos from the racial categories and assigns them to a separate category. Hispanics/Latinos may be of any race.
Race (NH = Non-Hispanic)	% 2020	% 2010	% 2000	Pop 2020	Pop 2010	Pop 2000
White alone (NH)	83.3%	89.9%	93.9%	7,921	8,134	8,089
Black alone (NH)	2.6%	1.7%	1.1%	248	156	94
American Indian alone (NH)	0.1%	0.3%	0.1%	13	26	6
Asian alone (NH)	2.1%	1.8%	1.1%	197	161	94
Pacific Islander alone (NH)	0%	0%	0%	4	0	2
Other race alone (NH)	0.6%	0.1%	0%	61	9	3
Multiracial (NH)	3.1%	1.3%	1%	295	114	87
Hispanic/Latino (any race)	8%	4.9%	2.8%	765	447	243

=== 2020 census ===
As of the 2020 census, Oakville had a population of 9,504. The median age was 45.0 years. 19.1% of residents were under the age of 18 and 20.0% of residents were 65 years of age or older. For every 100 females there were 94.7 males, and for every 100 females age 18 and over there were 89.3 males age 18 and over.

99.9% of residents lived in urban areas, while 0.1% lived in rural areas.

There were 3,802 households in Oakville, of which 28.3% had children under the age of 18 living in them. Of all households, 47.4% were married-couple households, 17.3% were households with a male householder and no spouse or partner present, and 28.7% were households with a female householder and no spouse or partner present. About 28.1% of all households were made up of individuals and 13.0% had someone living alone who was 65 years of age or older.

There were 3,990 housing units, of which 4.7% were vacant. The homeowner vacancy rate was 1.2% and the rental vacancy rate was 4.4%.

The most reported ancestries in 2020 were:

- Italian (28.9%)
- Irish (20%)
- English (11.7%)
- German (9.5%)
- French (9.2%)
- Polish (5.9%)
- Albanian (5.1%)
- Puerto Rican (4.6%)
- Lithuanian (3.1%)
- Scottish (2.5%)

=== 2000 census ===
As of the 2000 census, there were 8,618 people, 3,255 households, and 2,369 families residing in the CDP. The population density was 1,053.0/km^{2} (2,726.7/mi^{2}). There were 3,358 housing units at an average density of 410.3/km^{2} (1,062.5/mi^{2}). The racial makeup of the CDP was 95.72% White, 1.17% African American, 0.08% Native American, 1.13% Asian, 0.02% Pacific Islander, 0.64% from other races, and 1.24% from two or more races. Hispanic or Latino of any race were 2.82% of the population.

There were 3,255 households, out of which 33.7% had children under the age of 18 living with them, 58.0% were married couples living together, 10.8% had a female householder with no husband present, and 27.2% were non-families. Of all households 23.2% were made up of individuals, and 10.0% had someone living alone who was 65 years of age or older. The average household size was 2.64 and the average family size was 3.13.

In the community, the population was spread out, with 24.8% under the age of 18, 6.8% from 18 to 24, 31.6% from 25 to 44, 23.0% from 45 to 64, and 13.8% who were 65 years of age or older. The median age was 38 years. For every 100 females, there were 90.8 males. For every 100 females age 18 and over, there were 90.9 males.

The median income for a household in the CDP was $48,395, and the median income for a family was $59,417. Males had a median income of $41,993 versus $29,055 for females. The per capita income for the CDP was $20,763. About 1.6% of families and 3.2% of the population were below the poverty line, including 1.0% of those under age 18 and 5.7% of those age 65 or over.

== Local media ==
- Waterbury Republican-American, a Waterbury-based independent daily newspaper
- Town Times, Prime Publishers Inc., a local newspaper serving Watertown, Oakville, Bunker Hill in Waterbury, Thomaston, and Northfield. Voices, its sister paper, covers Southbury, Middlebury, Oxford, Seymour, Naugatuck, Woodbury, Bethlehem, New Preston, Washington, Washington Depot, Roxbury, Bridgewater, Monroe, Sandy Hook and Newtown

== Education ==
It is in the Watertown School District.
