= Delhi Reservoir =

- Location of Delhi Reservoir within New York
- Location: Delaware County, New York
- Coordinates: 42°17′21″N 74°55′52″W
- Type: Reservoir
- Primary inflows: Steele Brook
- Primary outflows: Steele Brook
- Surface elevation: 1,545 feet (471 m)
- Settlements: Delhi

Delhi Reservoir was a small reservoir located northwest of Delhi in Delaware County, New York. Steele Brook flowed through Delhi Reservoir.

== See also ==
- List of lakes in New York
