= First Congregational Church of Litchfield =

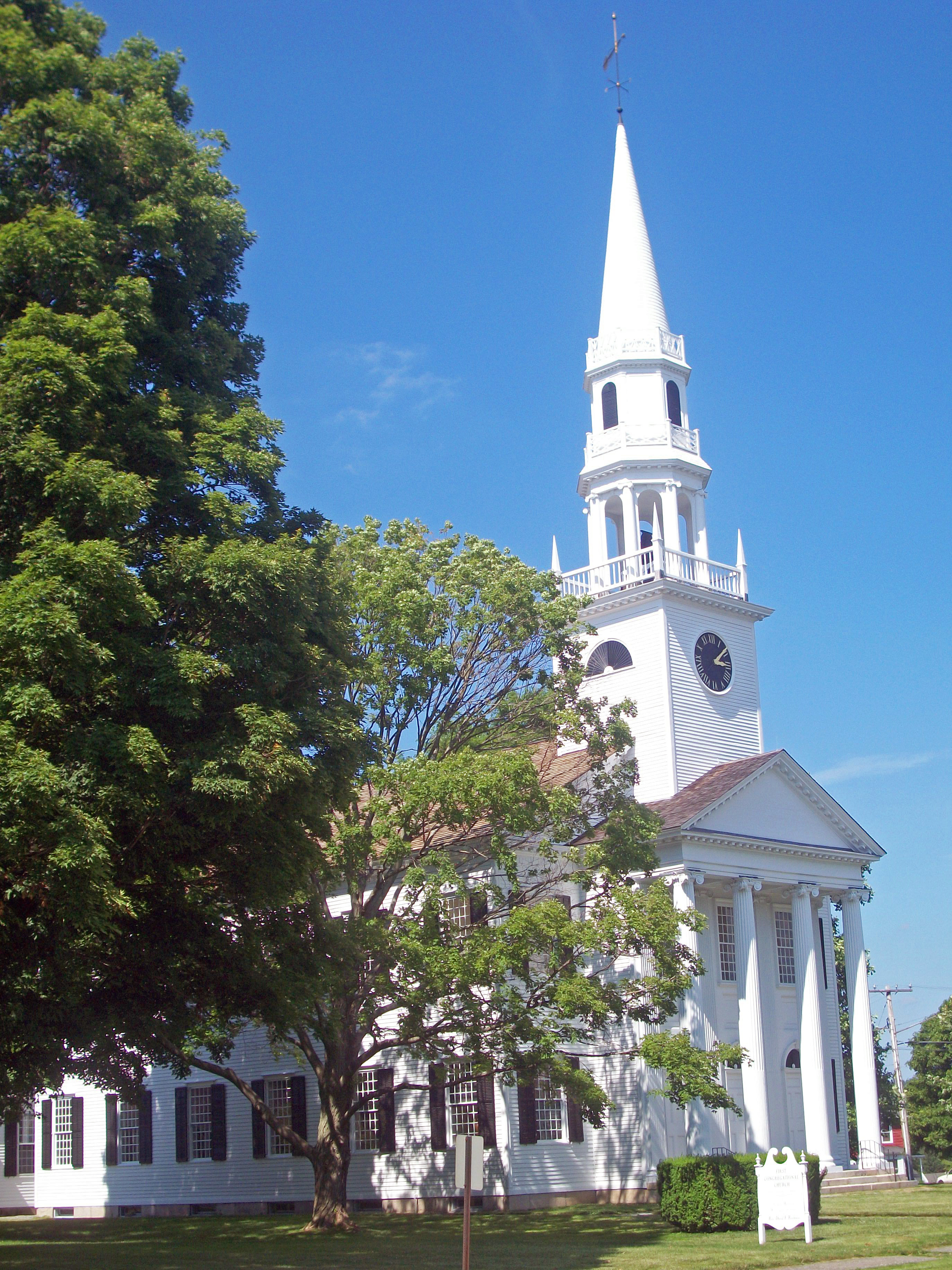
- First Congregational Church of Litchfield
- 41.7479°N 73.1883°W
- Location: Litchfield, Connecticut
- Country: US
- Denomination: Non Denomination / Independent
- Previous denomination: Congregational
- Website: fcclitchfield.com

History
- Founded: 1721

Architecture
- Heritage designation: Contributing property in Litchfield Historic District, a National Historic Landmark

The First Congregational Church of Litchfield is a congregation of the United Church of Christ in Litchfield, Connecticut, USA, occupying a historic building on the Litchfield green.

== History ==
The church was founded in 1721, when the town was first settled. The original wooden meetinghouse was completed in 1723 and replaced on the same site in 1761. The early meetinghouse served not only for public worship but also as a venue for town meetings and other community gatherings. Also, gunpowder and shot were stockpiled there for the defense of the community, and the meetinghouse was the recruiting site for a Continental Army that was formed in Litchfield early in the Revolutionary War. The adjacent church parsonage was built in 1787.

=== Lyman Beecher ===
The prominent American preacher Lyman Beecher served the First Congregational Church as its minister from 1810 to 1826. Beecher's fame as a preacher attracted people to the church. Six sermons on intemperance that he delivered in the church in 1814 were widely republished and are considered to have been influential in advancing the cause of temperance. While in Litchfield he also gained widespread attention for his preaching against Unitarianism, which he regarded as heresy. Beecher's eloquence in his opposition to Unitarianism led to his being invited to leave Litchfield in 1826 to serve a church in Boston, where his fame as a preacher grew.

=== Church building ===
The current building, constructed in 1829 in the Greek Revival style, is the congregation's third meetinghouse. In 1969, The New York Times called it "one of the best examples of early 19th-century church architecture" and in 2005 the same newspaper called it "a New England icon" and "one of Connecticut's familiar landmarks." It is described by the National Park Service as the "anchor" of the Litchfield Historic District, which is a National Historic Landmark. It is also called "the best known symbol of Litchfield" and is reputed to be the most photographed church building in New England.

The 1829 meetinghouse was built after the church had outgrown its 1761 building, due in part to the popularity of Lyman Beecher's preaching. There is no definite record indicating who designed the 1829 church. Five other Congregational churches were built on essentially the same design in the Connecticut towns of Old Lyme (the 1816–17 Old Lyme Congregational Church), Milford (1823), Cheshire (the 1827 First Congregational Church of Cheshire), Southington (1830), and Guilford (the 1830 First Congregational Church of Guilford). All six churches are fronted by Ionic porticos with four fluted columns, the doors of all six churches have the same dimensions, all six steeples are of the same design (described as a "four-stage Gibbsian tower and spire"); the specific prototype being James Gibbs' St Martin-in-the-Fields, London. All are surmounted by weathervanes that all appear to have been cast from the same mold, and all six churches have twenty-over-twenty double-hung windows. The similarities suggest that some of the building elements may have been prefabricated.

The 1829 meetinghouse remained in use for several decades, until its architectural style fell out of favor during the years after the Civil War. Henry Ward Beecher, a leading Congregational minister of the era who had been born in Litchfield during the years when his father was the church's minister, said of the building: "There is not a single line or feature in the old building suggesting taste or beauty". The building was moved a short distance down the road, without its steeple, to make way for a new church building. The fourth meetinghouse, which was completed in 1873, was a wooden structure in a Victorian Gothic style, with stained-glass windows and dark-colored pews and pulpit furniture.

By the early 20th century, church members had lost their fondness for the new building and sought to return the church's third meetinghouse to its original location. In 1929, the meetinghouse that was built in 1873 was razed. In 1930, the third meetinghouse, which had been in use at various times as a dance hall, armory, cinema, gymnasium, and roller skating rink, was reconstructed on its original site and rededicated "for the town's use in public worship". The church restoration project, done at a cost of $75,000, was part of a colonial revival initiative in Litchfield, in which townspeople also replaced a modern stone tower on the courthouse with a brick tower more consistent with colonial style, painted their houses and shops white, and added black shutters and other Colonial era architectural details to give the community a look reminiscent of 18th-century America. The community effort was inspired by news reports about plans to build a replica of an old English village in a suburb of Chicago; several New York City residents who maintained summer homes in Litchfield resolved to undertake a similar project to restore the town center to a look consistent with its own history.

A major restoration project, with an estimated cost of $1.9 million, was undertaken in 2005 to address problems due to serious structural deterioration, as well as to install a sprinkler system and renovate the church parsonage. A Save America's Treasures grant in the amount of $200,000 was awarded in 2004 to assist with the project.

== Affiliation ==
The church was founded in the Congregationalist tradition. The congregation is an independent non denominational church.
