= Old Lyme Congregational Church =

Church in Connecticut, US

Coordinates: 41.3129°N 72.3319°W

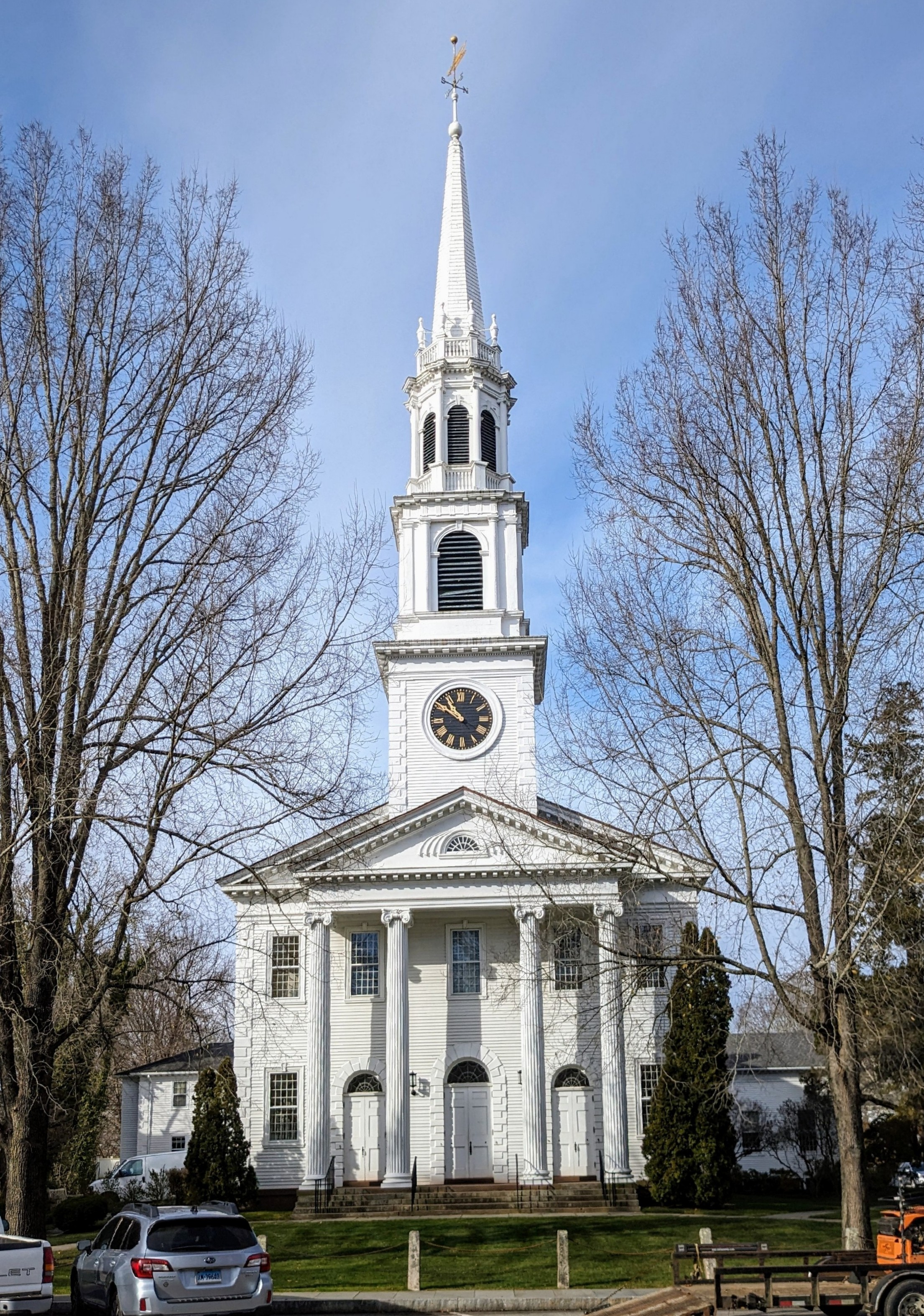
The church in 2023

The Old Lyme Congregational Church is located in Old Lyme, Connecticut. The church is noteworthy for having been a favorite subject of Old Lyme art colony painters. It is affiliated with the United Church of Christ.

== History ==
The first Meeting House was built in 1665 and the first minister was Moses Noyes. New buildings were constructed in 1689 and 1738. The current building was erected in 1816-7 by architect Samuel Belcher, Belcher also designed the John Sill and William Noyes houses on Lyme Street. The building, burnt down in a July 3, 1907 fire, was rebuilt in 1908-09 with help from artists at the Old Lyme art colony.

Five other Congregational churches were built essentially to the same design in the Connecticut towns of Milford (1823), Cheshire (the 1827 First Congregational Church of Cheshire), Litchfield (the 1829 First Congregational Church of Litchfield), Southington (1830), and Guilford (the 1830 First Congregational Church of Guilford). All six churches have front porticos with four fluted columns, the doors of all six have the same dimensions, all six steeples are of the same design and are surmounted by weathervanes that appear to have been cast from one mold, and all six churches have twenty-over-twenty double-hung windows. The similarities suggest that some of the building elements may have been prefabricated.

The building was restored circa 2001 by volunteers, including architect Steve Lloyd.

== Paintings ==
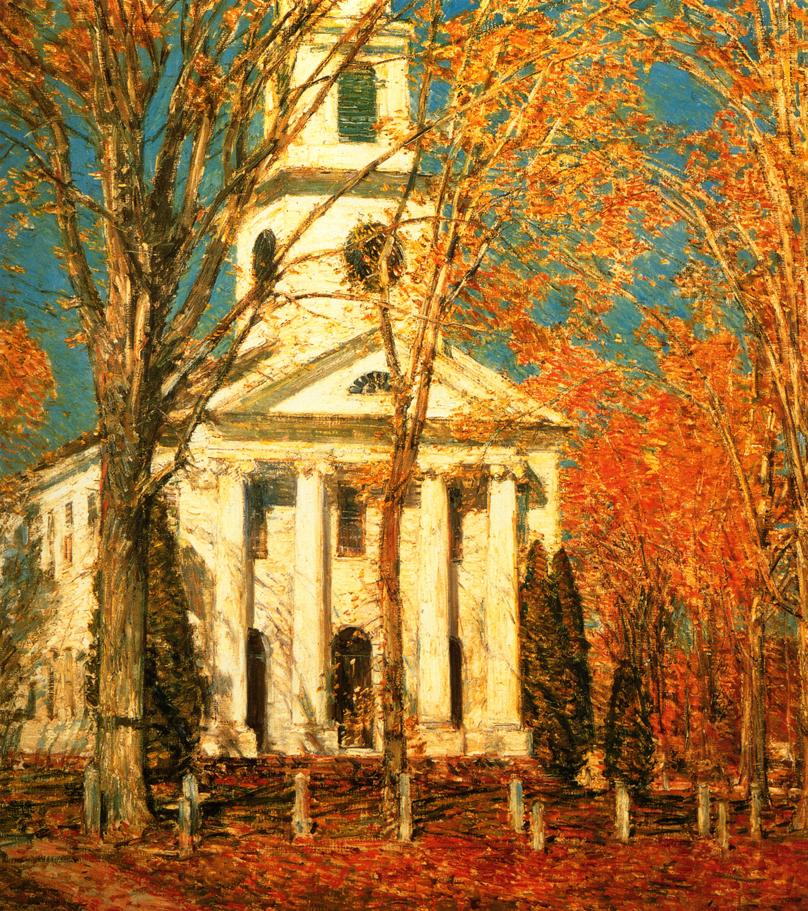
Church at Old Lyme, oil on canvas, Childe Hassam, 1905. Albright-Knox Art Gallery, Buffalo, New York.

Impressionist Childe Hassam depicted the church in a series of three celebrated paintings from 1903 to 1906. One hangs in the Parrish Art Museum in Southampton, New York. Another is displayed in the Albright-Knox Art Gallery in Buffalo, New York. Hassam's paintings helped bring publicity to the Old Lyme art colony and helped tourism in the town. Other artists at the colony, including Charles Ebert and Everett Warner (in about 1911), also tried their hands at painting the church.
