= First Congregational Church of Cheshire =

Historic church in Connecticut, United States

- U.S. National Register of Historic Places
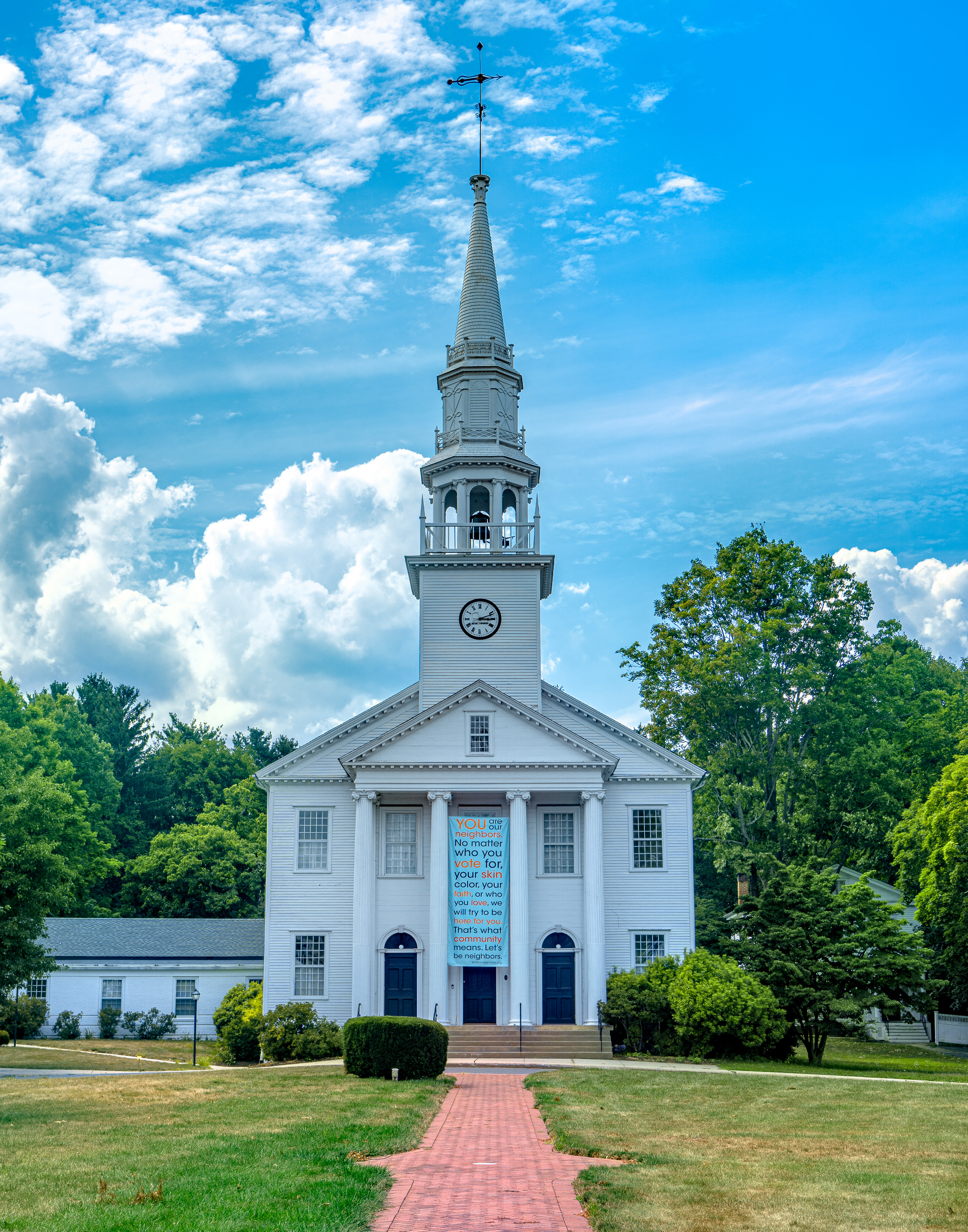

- Location within Connecticut Location within the United States
- Location: 111 Church Drive, Cheshire, Connecticut
- Coordinates: 41°29′53″N 72°54′13″W
- Area: 2 acres (0.81 ha)
- Built: 1827
- Architect: David Hoadley
- Architectural style: Federal, Adamesque
- NRHP reference No.: 73001950
- Added to NRHP: February 16, 1973

The First Congregational Church of Cheshire is a historic church at 111 Church Drive in Cheshire, Connecticut. Built in 1827, it was designed by David Hoadley and is a prominent local example of Federal period architecture. It was added to the National Register of Historic Places in 1973. The congregation is affiliated with the United Church of Christ.

== Architecture and history ==
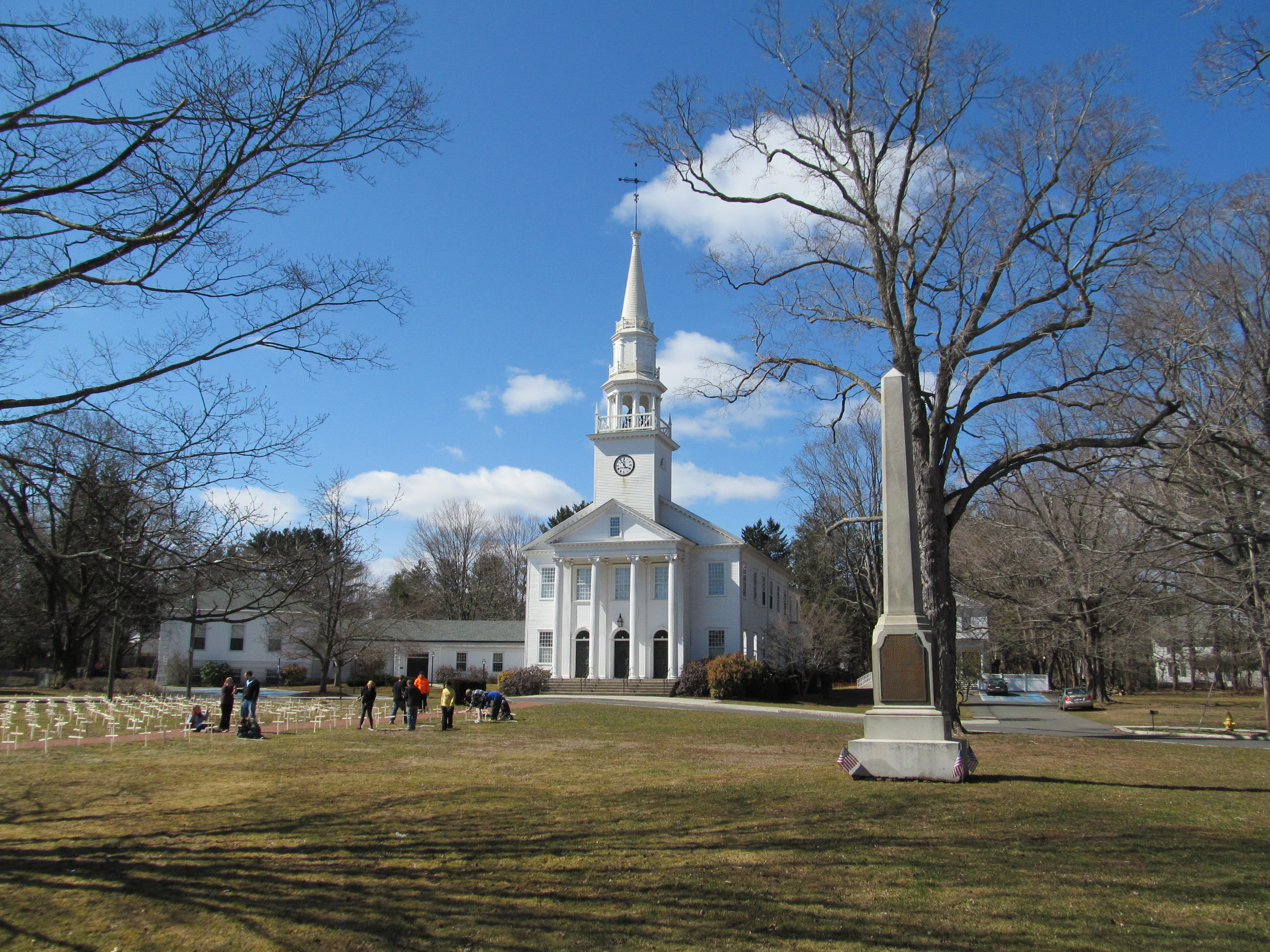
Church and surrounding Green

The First Congregational Church is located in Cheshire's town center, on the west side of Connecticut Route 10 opposite the town hall. It is separated by CT 10 by a surviving element of the town green, now owned and managed by the church, and is accessed via Church Drive. It is a two-story wood-frame structure, with a gabled roof and clapboarded exterior. Its front facade has a projecting four-column temple front, with round fluted columns rising to Ionic capitals and a fully pedimented gable. Straddling the projecting and the main roof is a tower, with a square base section housing a clock, two octagonal stages (one of which houses an open belfry), and a conical steeple ending in a cross.

Five other Congregational churches were built on essentially the same design in the Connecticut towns of Old Lyme (the 1816-17 Old Lyme Congregational Church), Milford (1823), Litchfield (the 1829 First Congregational Church of Litchfield), Southington (1830), and Guilford (the 1830 First Congregational Church of Guilford). All six churches have front porticos with four fluted columns, the doors of all six have the same dimensions, all six steeples are of the same design and are surmounted by weathervanes that appear to have been cast from one mold, and all six churches have twenty-over-twenty double-hung windows. The similarities suggest that some of the building elements may have been prefabricated.

== See also ==
- National Register of Historic Places listings in New Haven County, Connecticut
