= Commodore Isaac Hull Memorial Bridge =

Commodore Hull Bridge
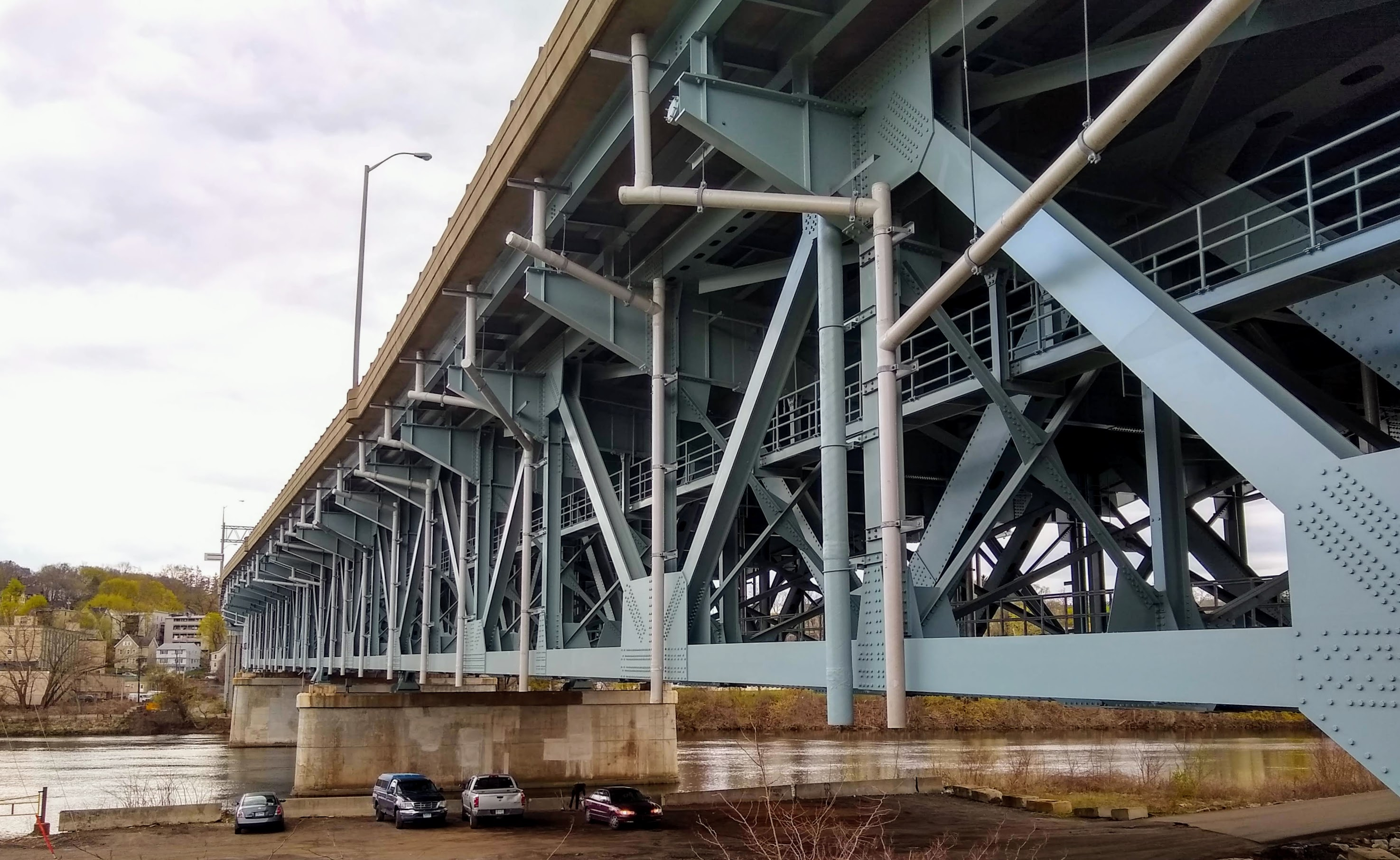
- Coordinates: 41°18′53″N 73°05′12″W
- Carries: 6 lanes of Route 8
- Crosses: Housatonic River
- Locale: Derby and Shelton, Connecticut
- Official name: Commodore Isaac Hull Memorial Bridge
- Maintained by: Connecticut Department of Transportation

Characteristics
- Design: steel truss bridge
- Total length: 1,578.2 ft (481 m)
- Width: 87.9 ft (26.8 m)
- Clearance below: 34.1 ft (10.4 m)

History
- Opened: 1951

Statistics
- Daily traffic: 83,700 (est. 2017-18)

Location
- Interactive map of Commodore Hull Bridge

The Commodore Isaac Hull Bridge carries Connecticut Route 8 over the Housatonic River, between Shelton and Derby, in Connecticut. The bridge was constructed in 1951 for Route 8. This deck-truss bridge, originally built in 1951 and named in honor of Commodore Isaac Hull who was born in Shelton. The bridge was widened during the 1980s to accommodate increased traffic with the completion of the Route 8 Expressway. This work was completed in 1990.

The deck-truss design is similar to that of the I-35W bridge in Minnesota that collapsed. Because of this, ConnDOT conducted an inspection on the Commodore Hull Bridge, and similar bridges throughout the state following the collapse. The bridge has recently been rated as "structurally deficient" and ConnDOT has completed its 2016-drafted plan. to rehabilitate the bridge's superstructure in early 2019.

== See also ==
- List of crossings of the Housatonic River
