= First Congregational Church of Guilford =

Coordinates: 41°11′55.3″N 73°24′32.5″W

First Congregational Church of Guilford is a United Church of Christ congregation in Guilford, Connecticut.

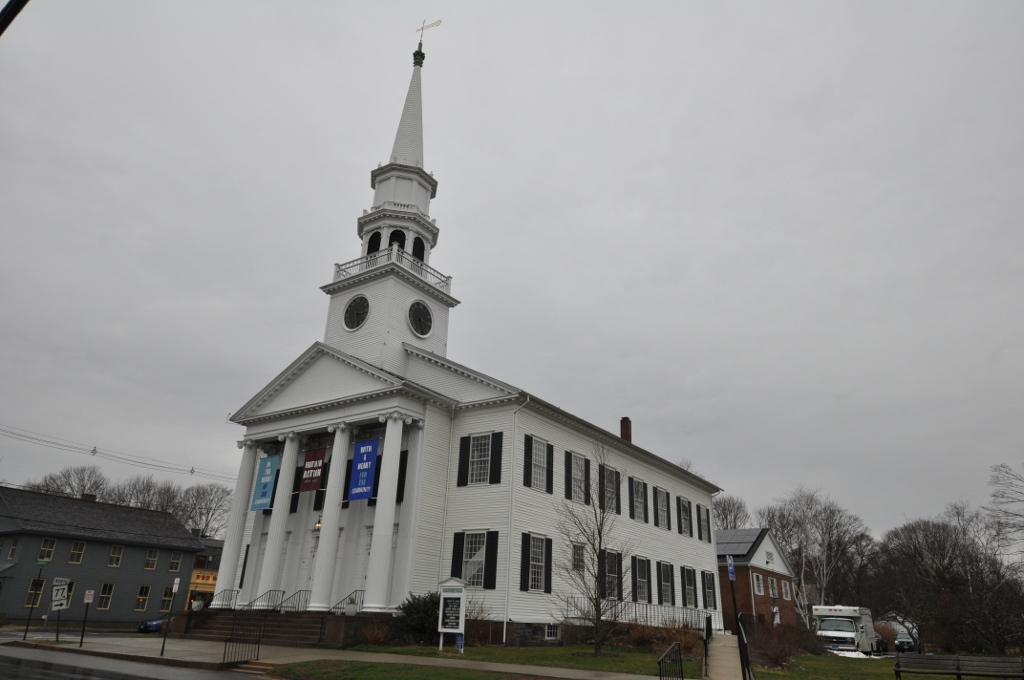
First Congregational Church in Guilford Historic Town Center, Guilford, Connecticut.

The church was founded in 1643, just a few years after the first settlement of Guilford in 1639. At that time, under the theocratic structure of the New Haven Colony, the town of Guilford and its church were essentially the same entity. Guilford's first meeting house was a simple stone structure with a thatched roof, located on the town green. It was expanded in the 1660s, 1670s, and 1680s, and finally replaced in 1713 with the construction of a larger building, also on the green, that is reputed to have been the first church in Connecticut with a steeple clock and a bell.

Initially the church served a very large area, which was reduced over time as new congregational societies were established in East Guilford (now the town of Madison), Cohabit (now North Guilford), and North Bristol (now North Madison).

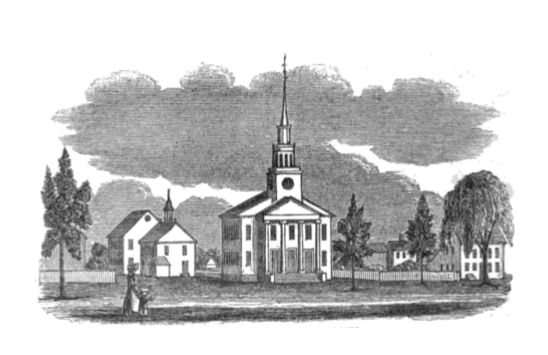
1838 view of Guilford from the Green showing (left to right) the Academy, the Congregational Church, and the Town House

The current church building, a wooden structure that overlooks the town green, was completed in 1830 as part of a campaign to clear the green of buildings. Five other Congregational churches were built on essentially the same design in the Connecticut towns of Old Lyme (the 1816–17 Old Lyme Congregational Church), Milford (1823), Cheshire (the 1827 First Congregational Church of Cheshire), Litchfield (the 1829 First Congregational Church of Litchfield), and Southington (1830). All six churches have front porticos with four fluted columns, the doors of all six have the same dimensions, all six steeples are of the same design and are surmounted by weathervanes that appear to have been cast from one mold, and all six churches have twenty-over-twenty double-hung windows. The similarities suggest that some of the building elements may have been prefabricated. The church lost its steeple in the 1938 New England hurricane, but the steeple was rebuilt the following year.

In the 19th century, the congregation was divided over the issue of slavery. After church leaders refused to allow local abolitionists to meet in the church, the church's abolitionist members formed a new separate congregation, the Third Congregational Church, which built its own meetinghouse in 1840. Aaron Dutton, who had been the First Congregational minister since 1806, left in 1842 because of the congregation's disapproval of his abolitionist views. According to the First Congregational Church's account of its own history, most of the members of the abolitionist church returned to First Church by 1920, after the slavery question had been resolved.
