= Derby Greenway =

Multipurpose trail in Derby, Connecticut, US

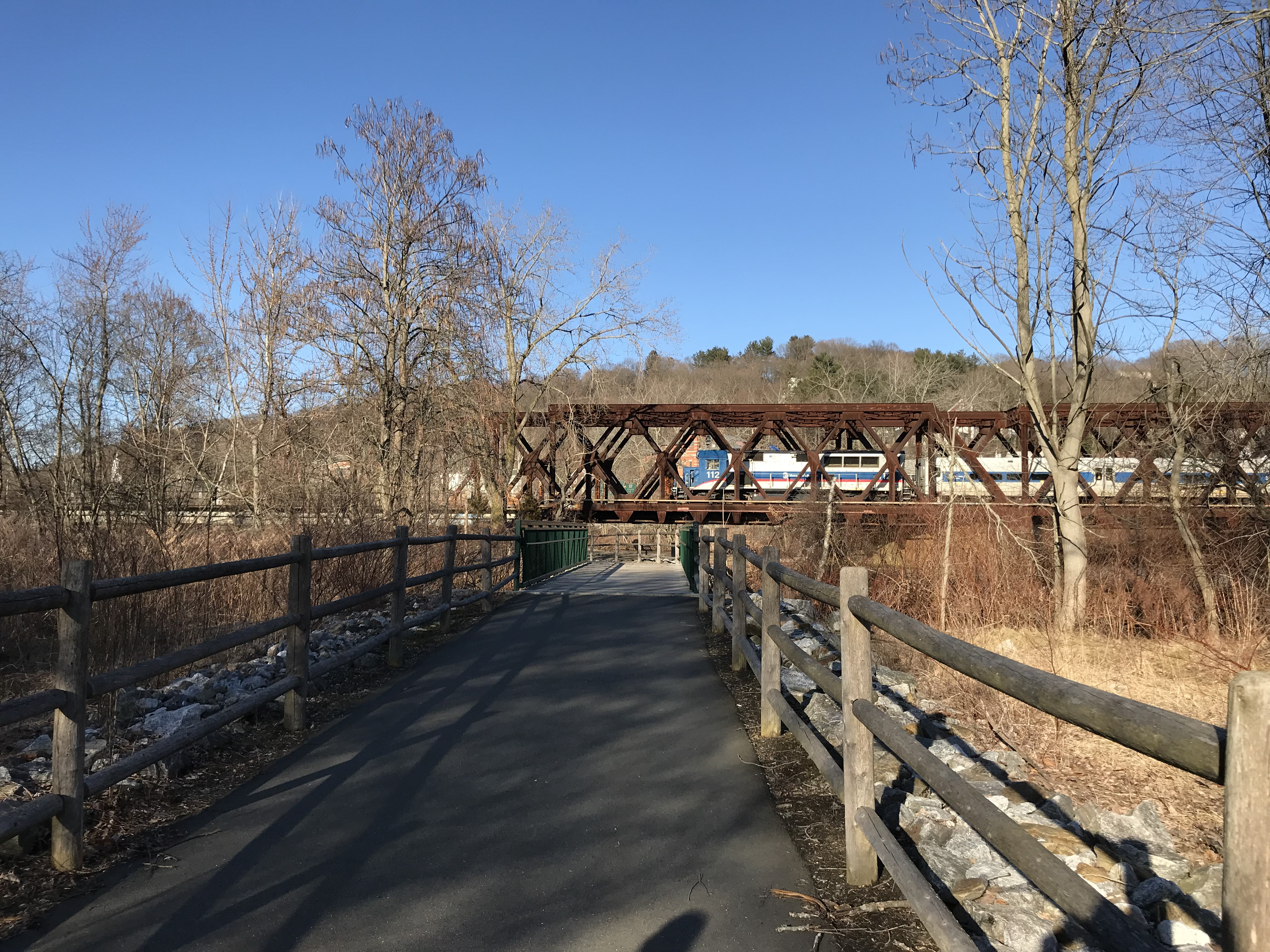
- Derby Greenway on O'Sullivans Island with a passing Northbound Metro North service above
- Length: 2.05 miles (3.30 km)
- Trailheads: Derby, Connecticut
- Use: Multi-use, non-motorized
- Season: Variable, depending on latitude
- Sights: Naugatuck River, Housatonic River
- Hazards: Weather, tick-borne diseases, poison ivy

The Derby Greenway is a 2.05 miles (3.30 km) long multipurpose trail located on the west side of Derby, Connecticut along the Naugatuck and Housatonic Rivers. The Greenway is part of the Naugatuck River Greenway Trail System, a proposed 44 miles (71 km) multipurpose trail that follows the Naugatuck River from Torrington to Derby. The Derby section of the Naugatuck River Greenway System is the second-busiest multipurpose trail in Connecticut (behind the Bluff Point State Park trail) with 217,163 trips counted in 2021.

== History ==
Construction broke ground in June 2005 and was completed in three stages, 2006, 2008, 2013 respectively.
