= Litchfield Historic District =

Historic district in Connecticut, United States

- U.S. National Register of Historic Places
- U.S. National Historic Landmark District
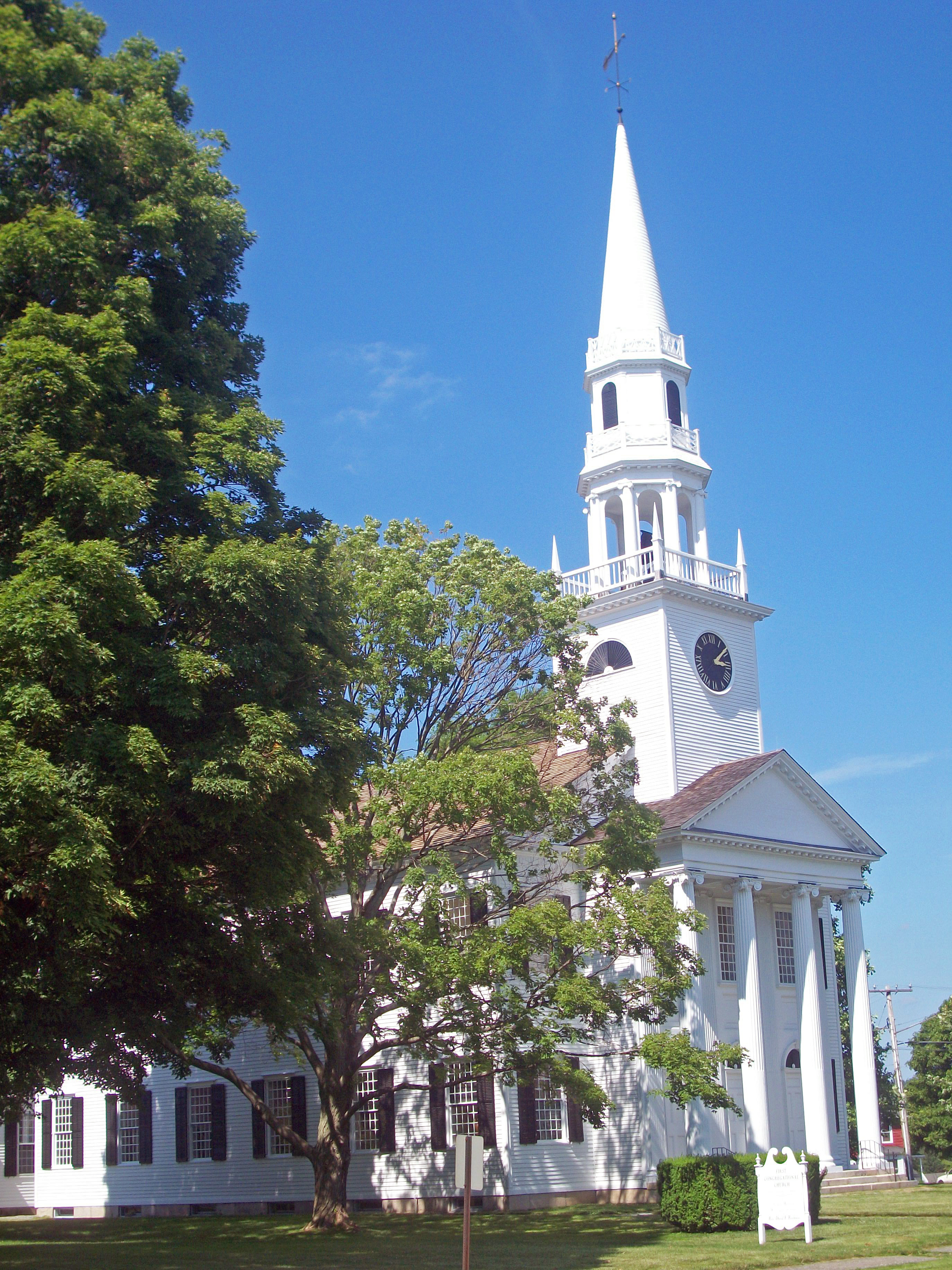
- South elevation and west profile of First Congregational Church, 2010

- Location within Connecticut Location within the United States
- Location: Litchfield, CT
- Coordinates: 41°44′50.6″N 73°11′24.5″W
- Architect: William Sprat
- Architectural style: Georgian, Greek Revival, Late Victorian
- NRHP reference No.: 68000050 (original); 78003456 (increase)

Significant dates
- Added to NRHP: November 24, 1968
- Boundary increase: November 29, 1978
- Designated NHLD: November 24, 1968

Litchfield Historic District, in Litchfield, Connecticut, is a National Historic Landmark District designated in 1968 as a notable and well-preserved example of a typical late 18th century New England village. As a National Historic Landmark, it is listed on the National Register of Historic Places (NRHP). It is the core area of a larger NRHP-listed historic district that includes the entire borough of Litchfield and was designated a state historic district in 1959.

This residential district is anchored by the Litchfield meetinghouse (1829) and is predominantly Georgian with clapboarding, gables and hipped roofs.

== Litchfield Town Green ==
At the center of the district is the Litchfield Town Green in the area of the intersection between Route 202 and Route 63, the main through routes of the town of Litchfield. The village green was originally established in 1720 and was primarily used as a common pasture ground, in addition to being the site of the first town meetinghouse, which was constructed in 1723. In the following years, other buildings were built on the green, including the first schoolhouse in the area in 1732, and the county courthouse in 1751, when Litchfield became the county seat of newly constituted Litchfield County. The use of the green as pasture ceased after the Revolutionary War and became used as a military parade ground. Its transformation into a park began in 1836, when it was officially designated by the town as such. The green was used as the center for recruitment during the Civil War and was also the place returning soldiers were welcomed. In the 20th century, various trees and shrubs were planted, and benches added as well. Several war monuments as well as a memorial fountain were also constructed.

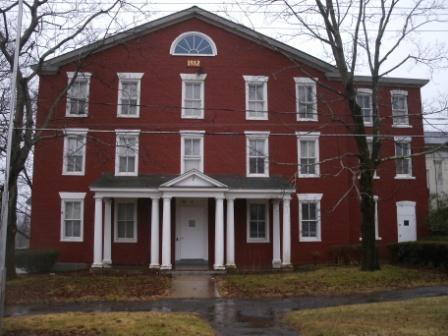
1812 building on the green

== South Street ==
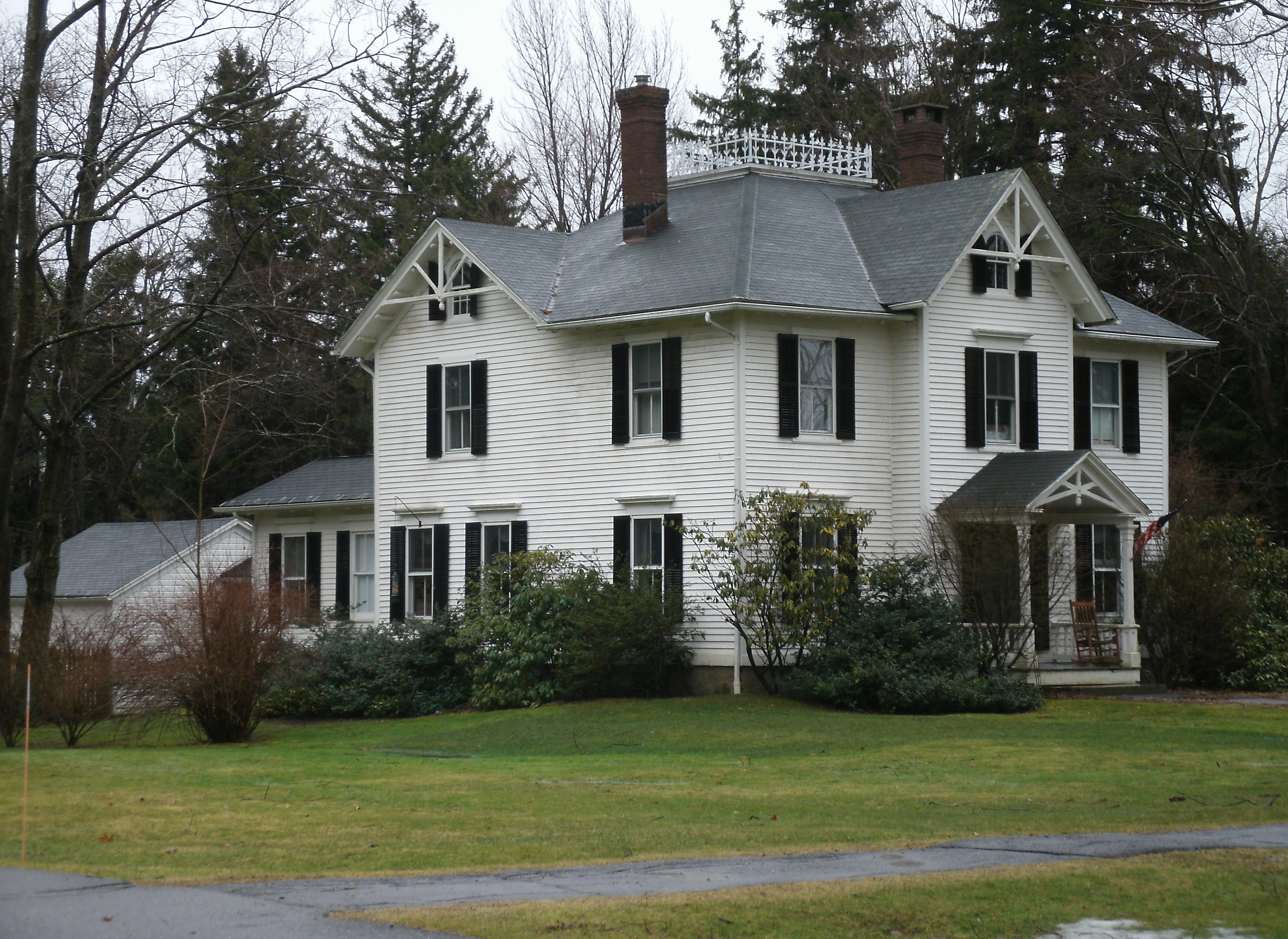
Stick style house at or adjacent to 127 South Street

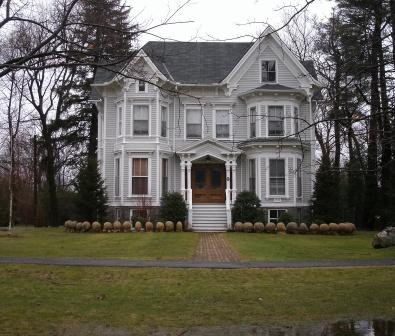
77 South Street

Along South Street are many houses. On South Street is the Tapping Reeve House and Law School, also known as Litchfield Law School, a one-room schoolhouse that was the first law school in the United States and where Aaron Burr, John C. Calhoun and others studied.

== North Street ==
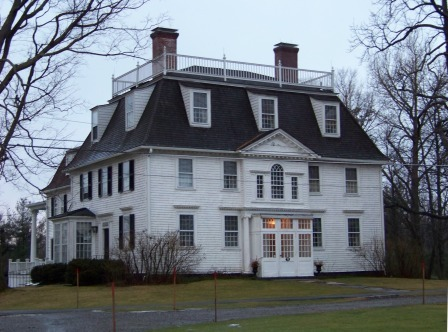
Sheldon Tavern, on North Street

Sheldon Tavern, on North Street, is one of the contributing properties. It was previously the home of Revolutionary War colonel Elisha Sheldon, for whom Sheldon was named.

== East Street ==
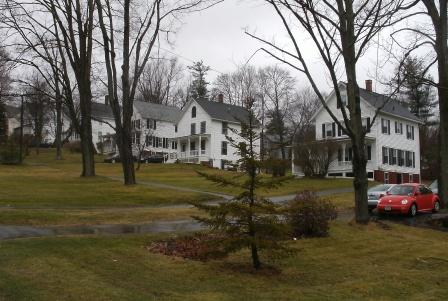
East Street houses, north side

The district includes historic houses on East Street descending a hill away from the church and downtown area.

== See also ==
- List of National Historic Landmarks in Connecticut
- National Register of Historic Places listings in Litchfield County, Connecticut
