= Thomaston (CDP), Connecticut =

Thomaston, Connecticut
- Census-designated place
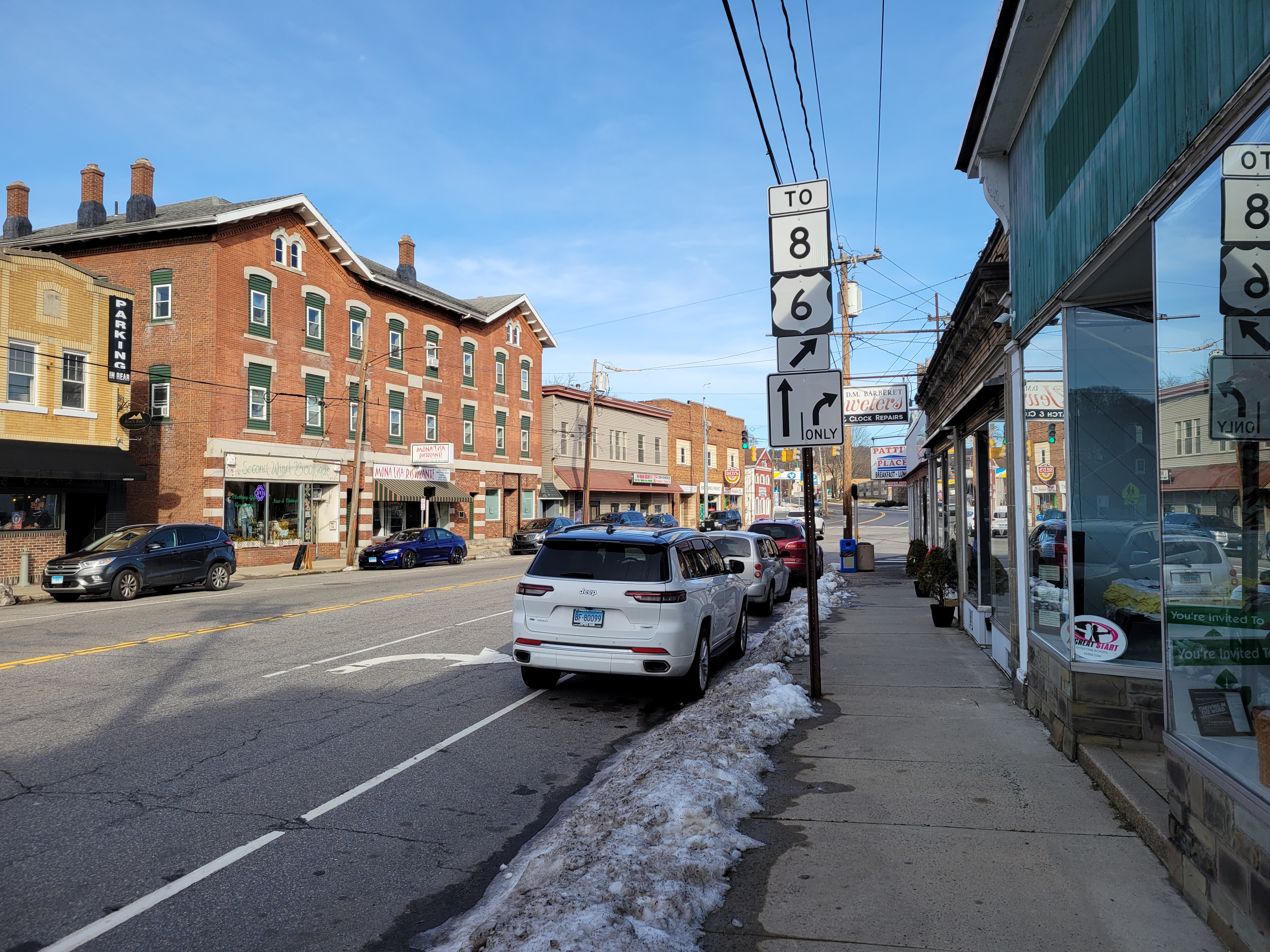
- Main Street

- Location in Litchfield County, Connecticut
- Coordinates: 41°40′26″N 73°4′22″W
- State: Connecticut
- County: Litchfield
- Town: Thomaston

Area
  - Total: 1.03 sq mi (2.66 km^{2})
  - Land: 1.02 sq mi (2.64 km^{2})
  - Water: 0.012 sq mi (0.03 km^{2})
- Elevation: 393 ft (120 m)

Population (2010)
  - Total: 1,910
  - Density: 1,876/sq mi (724.5/km^{2})
- ZIP Code: 06787
- FIPS code: 09-75660
- GNIS feature ID: 2631577

Thomaston is a census-designated place (CDP) in Litchfield County, Connecticut, United States. It comprises the downtown portion of the town of Thomaston. As of the 2010 census, the population of the CDP was 1,910, out of 7,887 in the entire town.

== Geography ==
The Thomaston CDP is slightly east of the geographic center of the town of Thomaston, on the west side of the Naugatuck River and its valley. It extends to the south as far as Watertown Road, to the west beyond Hillside Cemetery and to Northfield Brook, to the north to a power line south of D. Welton Way, and to the east to Williams Street, Electric Avenue, and the Naugatuck River.

U.S. Route 6 follows Main Street through Thomaston; it leads east to Bristol and southwest to Watertown. The Connecticut Route 8 freeway passes east of the CDP, leading south 9 miles (14 km) to Waterbury.

According to the U.S. Census Bureau, the Thomaston CDP has a total area of 1.0 square mile (2.7 km^{2}), of which 0.01 square miles (0.03 km^{2}), or 0.95%, are water.

== Demographics ==
As of the census of 2010, there were 1,910 people, 864 households, and 482 families residing in the CDP. The population density was 1,876 inhabitants per square mile (724/km^{2}). There were 946 housing units, of which 82, or 8.7%, were vacant. The racial makeup of the CDP was 95.3% White, 0.5% African American, 0.4% American Indian or Alaska Native, 0.5% Asian, 1.6% some other race, and 1.7% from two or more races. Hispanic or Latino of any race were 4.5% of the population.

Of the 320 households in the community, 25.5% had children under the age of 18 living with them, 39.9% were headed by married couples living together, 11.3% had a female householder with no husband present, and 44.2% were non-families. 37.0% of all households were made up of individuals, and 28.4% were someone living alone who was 65 years of age or older. The average household size was 2.21, and the average family size was 2.92.

20.7% of the CDP population were under the age of 18, 7.0% were from 18 to 24, 23.3% were from 25 to 44, 32.3% were from 45 to 64, and 16.6% were 65 years of age or older. The median age was 44.3 years. For every 100 females, there were 86.7 males. For every 100 females age 18 and over, there were 84.4 males.

For the period 2013–17, the estimated median annual income for a household in the CDP was $54,444, and the median income for a family was $69,406. Male full-time workers had a median income of $48,167 versus $52,788 for females. The per capita income for the CDP was $28,349. About 11.1% of families and 9.3% of the population were living below the poverty line, including 26.5% of those under age 18 and 4.1% of those age 65 or over.

== Education ==
It is in the Thomaston School District.
