= Erastus L. De Forest =

American Mathematician

Erastus Lyman De Forest
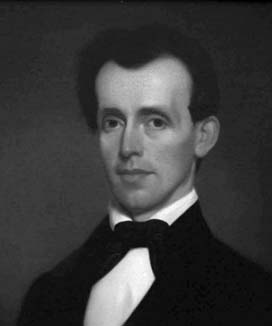
- Born: June 27, 1834; Watertown, Connecticut
- Died: June 6, 1888 (aged 53); Watertown, Connecticut
- Education: Yale University
- Scientific career
- Fields: Mathematics
- Workplaces: Yale University

Erastus Lyman De Forest (1834–1888) was an American mathematician who studied at Yale University.

== Life and work ==
Son of a Yale graduate, De Forest graduated himself at Yale University in 1854 and was awarded PhB in 1856. De Forest later vanished for two years while on a trip to New York, and his family feared the worst, but he eventually turned up in Australia, teaching in Melbourne. In 1861, he returned to New Haven and devoted himself to the study of mathematics.

In 1867–68, he was asked by his uncle, who was the president of Knickerbocker Life Insurance Company of New York, to improve the mortality tables used in his business.

Between 1870 and 1885, De Forest published more than twenty articles on statistics, using in some of them an early version of the Monte Carlo method to smooth time series.

== DeForest Senior Prize in Mathematics ==
The DeForest Senior Prize in Mathematics was established by John DeForest (Erastus's father) at Yale University in 1855 and increased in 1886 by Erastus. It is awarded to seniors for proficiency in pure and applied mathematics.

== Bibliography ==
- Gentle, James E. (2002). Elements of Computational Statistics. Springer. ISBN 0-387-95489-9.
- Stigler, Stephen M (1978). "Mathematical Statistics in the Early States". The Annals of Statistics. 6 (2): 239–265. doi:10.1214/aos/1176344123. ISSN 0090-5364. JSTOR 2958876.
