= Watertown, Connecticut =

- Town
- Town of Watertown
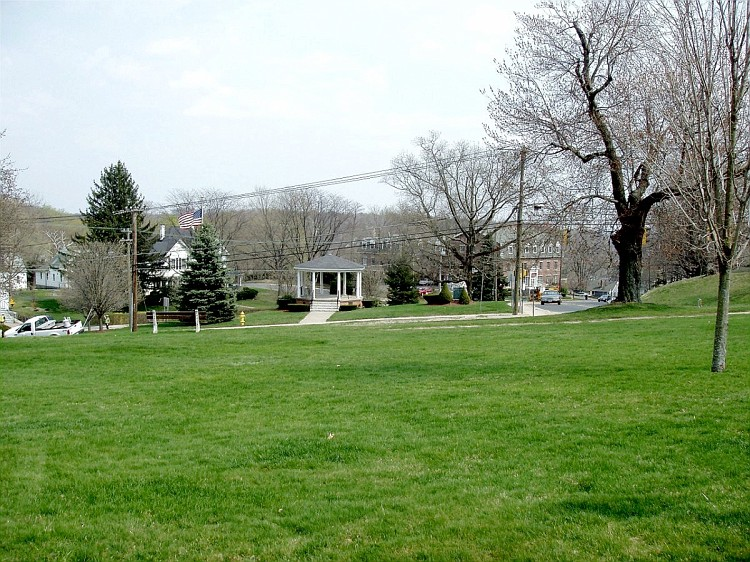
- Munson Memorial Park

- Seal

- Coordinates: 41°36′53″N 73°07′59″W
- Country: United States
- U.S. state: Connecticut
- County: Litchfield
- Region: Naugatuck Valley
- Incorporated: 1780

Government
  - Type: Council-manager
  - Town manager: Mark A Raimo
  - Town council: Johnathan Ramsay, Chm. (R); Mary Ann Rosa, Vice Chm. (R); Ken Demirs (R); Robert Desena (R); Anthony DiBona (R); Robert Retallick (R); Gary Lafferty (I); Denise Russ (D); Rachel Ryan (D)

Area
  - Total: 29.5 sq mi (76.4 km^{2})
  - Land: 29.0 sq mi (75.1 km^{2})
  - Water: 0.50 sq mi (1.3 km^{2})
- Elevation: 583 ft (178 m)

Population (2020)
  - Total: 22,105
  - Density: 762/sq mi (294.3/km^{2})
- Time zone: UTC-5 (Eastern)
  - Summer (DST): UTC-4 (Eastern)
- ZIP Codes: 06779, 06795
- Area codes: 860/959
- FIPS code: 09-80490
- GNIS feature ID: 0213527
- Website: www.watertownct.org

Watertown is a town in Litchfield County, Connecticut, United States. The town is part of the Naugatuck Valley Planning Region. The population was 22,105 at the 2020 census. It is a suburb of Waterbury. The urban center of the town is the Watertown census-designated place, with a population of 3,938 at the 2020 census.

== History ==
Watertown, before colonization, belonged to the Paugasuck Indians. In that time, the colony was called "Mattatock", though it had several variations in spelling through the years. Colonization of the area today called Watertown began in 1684 when Thomas Judd and other proprietors bought the land as a group. The land where Watertown is now located, having originally belonged to Mattatock, officially changed its name to Watterbury (now Waterbury) by record on March 20, 1695, by consensus of a council.

In 1729, the Garnsey family settled in an area of Watterbury, now called Guernseytown. The oldest house in Watertown today was built in 1735 on Main Street. A poet from the Revolutionary War, John Trumbull, was born here in 1750.

With a population of 338, the First Ecclesiastical Society of Westbury was formed. The Town of Watertown was officially established in 1780 when Westbury separated from Watterbury.

Some years later, in 1893, The Taft School was established in Watertown and has been there ever since.

== Geography ==
Watertown is in southeastern Litchfield County and is bordered to the southeast by the city of Waterbury in New Haven County. Other bordering towns are Middlebury to the south, Woodbury and Bethlehem to the west, Morris to the northwest, and Thomaston to the east. It is in the Eastern Standard time zone. The elevation at the town center is 583 feet (178 m).

According to the United States Census Bureau, the town has a total area of 29.5 square miles (76.4 km^{2}), of which 29.0 square miles (75.1 km^{2}) are land and 0.50 square miles (1.3 km^{2}), or 1.72%, are water. Oakville, which is often mistaken for a separate town, is in the southeastern part of Watertown. Although Oakville has its own post office and ZIP code, it does not have a charter or town government of its own. Oakville receives all of its town services (police, fire, water and so on) from Watertown.

== Demographics ==
Historical population
Census	Pop.	Note	%±
1820	1,439		—
1850	1,533		—
1860	1,587		3.5%
1870	1,698		7.0%
1880	1,897		11.7%
1890	2,323		22.5%
1900	3,100		33.4%
1910	3,850		24.2%
1920	6,050		57.1%
1930	8,192		35.4%
1940	8,787		7.3%
1950	10,699		21.8%
1960	14,837		38.7%
1970	18,610		25.4%
1980	19,489		4.7%
1990	20,456		5.0%
2000	21,661		5.9%
2010	22,514		3.9%
2020	22,105		−1.8%
U.S. Decennial Census

As of the census of 2000, there were 21,661 people, 8,046 households, and 5,994 families residing in the town. The population density was 743.0 inhabitants per square mile (286.9/km^{2}). There were 8,298 housing units at an average density of 284.6 per square mile (109.9/km^{2}). The racial makeup of the town was 96.46% White, 0.75% African American, 0.12% Native American, 1.27% Asian, 0.05% Pacific Islander, 0.48% from other races, and 0.87% from two or more races. Hispanic or Latino of any race were 1.87% of the population.

There were 8,046 households, out of which 34.7% had children under the age of 18 living with them, 61.7% were married couples living together, 9.4% had a female householder with no husband present, and 25.5% were non-families. 21.7% of all households were made up of individuals, and 9.4% had someone living alone who was 65 years of age or older. The average household size was 2.67 and the average family size was 3.13.

In the town, the population was spread out, with 24.8% under the age of 18, 6.3% from 18 to 24, 29.9% from 25 to 44, 24.9% from 45 to 64, and 14.1% who were 65 years of age or older. The median age was 39 years. For every 100 females, there were 92.0 males. For every 100 females age 18 and over, there were 90.6 males.

The median income for a household in the town was $59,420, and the median income for a family was $68,761. Males had a median income of $47,097 versus $31,822 for females. The per capita income for the town was $26,044. About 1.1% of families and 2.2% of the population were below the poverty line, including 0.8% of those under age 18 and 3.7% of those age 65 or over.

== Arts and culture ==
Notable places include:

- The Taft School, a private boarding school
- Watertown Historical Society

== Education ==
The Watertown School District|Watertown Public School District, which covers the CDP, has a total of 2,578 students enrolled in its five schools during the 2023-2024 school year. Out of these five schools, there is one preschool to second grade school, John Trumbull Primary School, and two elementary schools for grades 3-5, the Judson and Polk Elementary Schools. After coming from these schools, children go to Swift Middle School and then to Watertown High School.

Watertown also is the home to a private boarding school, Taft School. The school provides boarding and day education for grades 9-12 and has been nestled in Watertown since 1908.

== Media ==
- Waterbury Republican-American, a Waterbury-based independent daily newspaper
- Town Times, Prime Publishers Inc., a local newspaper serving Watertown, Oakville, Bunker Hill in Waterbury, Thomaston and Northfield. Voices, its sister paper, covers Southbury, Middlebury, Oxford, Seymour, Naugatuck, Woodbury, Bethelhem, New Preston, Washington, Washington Depot, Roxbury, Bridgewater, Monroe, Sandy Hook and Newtown.
- Macaroni Kid, an online magazine for families in Watertown

== Infrastructure ==
=== Transportation ===
The Route 8 expressway runs through the eastern edge of town, with two exits inside the town. Route 8 leads north 14 miles (23 km) to Torrington and south through Waterbury 34 miles (55 km) to Bridgeport. The main routes through the center of Watertown are Route 6 running east–west and Route 63 running north–south. Route 6 leads northeast 30 miles (48 km) to Hartford, the state capital, and southwest 30 miles (48 km) to Danbury, while Route 63 leads north 10 miles (16 km) to Litchfield and south the same distance to Naugatuck. Other important highways include Route 73 (a more direct route leading through Oakville to Waterbury) and Route 262, which runs north from Oakville through the eastern part of Watertown.

Public transportation is provided by buses of Northeast Transportation Company.

== Notable people ==
- Amanda Boulier, professional hockey player of Professional Women's Hockey League the Montreal Victoire
- Rico Brogna, MLB first baseman who played for the Detroit Tigers, New York Mets, Philadelphia Phillies, Boston Red Sox, and Atlanta Braves from 1992 to 2001
- Joe Cipriano, television announcer CBS, Fox, radio personality WWCO, WRQX, and KIIS FM
- Erastus L. De Forest (1834–1888), mathematician
- Edward Fitzsimmons Dunne (1853–1937), 31st mayor of Chicago (1905–1907); governor of Illinois (1913–1917); born in Watertown
- David Gravel, racing driver
- Benjamin B. Hotchkiss (1826–1885), for whom the Hotchkiss School was named by his widow, was one of the leading American ordnance engineers of his day; born in Watertown but in early childhood moved to Sharon
- Leatherman (1839–1889), drifter within the Connecticut and Hudson River Valley areas, known for his leather clothing
- Meredith Mallory, former US congressman
- Chris McKenna, actor featured in State of Affairs, The Young and the Restless, and One Life to Live
- Thomas Tessier, writer of horror novels and short stories
- John Trumbull (1750–1831), political satirist and poet; born in Watertown
- David Kenyon Webster (1922–1961), soldier, journalist and author
- Justin Waldron, internet entrepreneur, co-founder of Zynga
- Allen B. Wilson and Nathaniel Wheeler, founders of Wheeler & Wilson Manufacturing Company in Watertown, one of the first manufacturers of sewing machines
