= Connecticut Route 118 =

State highway in Litchfield County, Connecticut, US

Route 118

- Map of Litchfield County in northwestern Connecticut with Route 118 highlighted in red

Route information
- Maintained by CTDOT
- Length: 7.48 mi (12.04 km)
- Existed: 1966 (1932 as Route 116)–present

Major junctions
- West end: Route 63 in Litchfield
- Route 8 in Harwinton
- East end: Route 4 in Harwinton

Location
- Country: United States
- State: Connecticut
- Counties: Litchfield

Highway system
- Connecticut State Highway System; Interstate; US; State; SSR; SR; Scenic
← Route 117	→ Route 120

Route 118 is a state highway in northwestern Connecticut, running from the borough of Litchfield via the village of East Litchfield to the town center of Harwinton. Route 118 is a scenic road at both ends. The 2.8-mile (4.5 km) section from the western terminus at the Litchfield green to the village of East Litchfield, and the 0.1-mile (0.16 km) section within the town center of Harwinton have both been designated by the state as scenic roads.

== Route description ==
Route 118 begins at the corner of South Street and East Street in the Litchfield green at the center of the borough at an intersection with Route 63. It heads east as the southern branch of East Street, crosses the Bantam River, then intersects with Route 254 (the road to the village of Northfield). Route 118 then enters the village of East Litchfield, where there is a junction with Thomaston Road, an old alignment of Route 8 before the expressway was built. It then crosses the Naugatuck River into the town of Harwinton where it immediately has a Junction with Route 8. Within Harwinton, Route 118 is known as Litchfield Road. Route 118 continues for another 2.6 miles (4.2 km) as it heads towards Harwinton center, where it ends at the junction with Route 4. Litchfield Road continues beyond Harwinton center as Route 4.

== History ==
The Litchfield and Harwinton Turnpike company was chartered in October 1798 to improve and maintain the road between the villages of Litchfield, Harwinton, and Burlington, where it connected to the Farmington and Bristol Turnpike. The turnpike used modern Route 118 then continued past Harwinton along modern Route 4 to the Avon town line. As part of the 1932 state highway renumbering, Route 116 was established along part of the old Litchfield and Harwinton Turnpike alignment between Route 8 in East Litchfield and Canton Road (Route 4) in Burlington. In 1956, the rest of the old turnpike alignment to the Litchfield green was added to Route 116. This section of Route 116 was upgraded to a partially access controlled road in 1961. The old alignment is now East Litchfield Road. In 1963, Route 4 was relocated to its modern alignment and the east end of Route 116 was truncated to Harwinton. In 1966, Route 116 was renumbered to Route 118 because the number 116 was used for a route in Ridgefield that was renumbered to match the number in New York.

== Junction list ==
The entire route is in Litchfield County.

Location	mi	km	Destinations	Notes
Litchfield	0.00	0.00	Route 63 – Goshen, East Morris	Western terminus
Litchfield	1.06	1.71	Route 254 south – Thomaston	Northern terminus of Route 254
Harwinton	4.71	7.58	Thomaston Road (SR 800 north)	
Harwinton	4.89	7.87	Route 8 – Waterbury, Torrington	Exit 46 on Route 8
Harwinton	6.53	10.51	Route 222 south – Thomaston	Northern terminus of Route 222
Harwinton	7.48	12.04	Route 4 – Torrington, Burlington	Eastern terminus
1.000 mi = 1.609 km; 1.000 km = 0.621 mi
