= Steele Brook =

Location
- Country: United States
- State: New York
- County: Delaware

Physical characteristics
- Source
  - location: NNW of Delhi
  - coordinates: 42°19′55″N 74°57′16″W
- Mouth: West Branch Delaware River
  - location: Delhi
  - coordinates: 42°17′27″N 74°55′55″W
  - elevation: 1,339 ft (408 m)

Steele Brook is a river in Delaware County, New York. It flows into the West Branch Delaware River by Delhi. Steele Brook flows through Delhi Reservoir.
