= Watertown (CDP), Connecticut =

Watertown, Connecticut
- Census-designated place
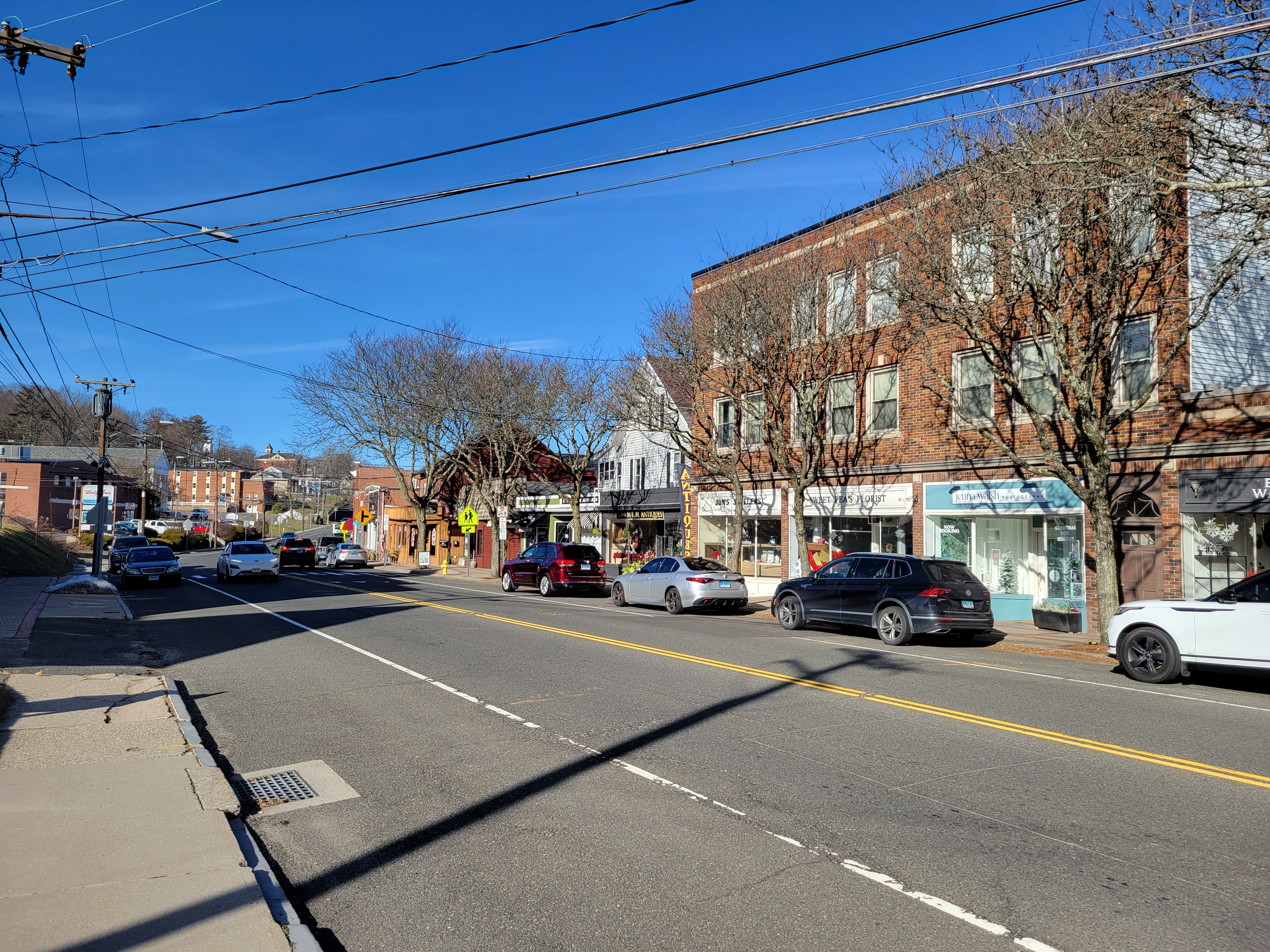
- Main Street

- Location in Litchfield County, Connecticut
- Coordinates: 41°36′21″N 73°7′5″W
- State: Connecticut
- County: Litchfield
- Town: Watertown

Area
  - Total: 2.12 sq mi (5.50 km^{2})
  - Land: 2.12 sq mi (5.49 km^{2})
  - Water: 0.0039 sq mi (0.01 km^{2})
- Elevation: 583 ft (178 m)

Population (2010)
  - Total: 3,574
  - Density: 1,687/sq mi (651.2/km^{2})
- ZIP Code: 06795
- FIPS code: 09-80420
- GNIS feature ID: 2631578

Watertown is a census-designated place (CDP) in Litchfield County, Connecticut, United States. It comprises the central village of the town of Watertown. As of the 2010 census, the population of the CDP was 3,574, out of 22,514 in the entire town. As of the 2020 Census, the population was 22,105.

== Geography ==
The Watertown CDP is slightly south of the geographic center of the town of Watertown, on a hill rising to the west of Steele Brook, a southeastward-flowing tributary of the Naugatuck River. The CDP is bordered to the southeast by the community of Oakville, the most populous place in Watertown. The Watertown CDP extends to the south as far as the junction of Connecticut Routes 63 and 73; to the west as far as Middlebury Road, Hamilton Lane, and Guernseytown Road; to the north as far as West Road and Merriam Lane; and to the east to Porter Street, Westbury Park Road, and French Street.

U.S. Route 6 follows Cutler Street, Deforest Street, and Woodbury Road through the center of the community; it leads northeast 5 miles (8 km) to Thomaston and southwest 7 miles (11 km) to Woodbury. Connecticut Route 63 is Watertown's Main Street; it leads north 10 miles (16 km) to Litchfield and south five miles to Interstate 84 at the western border of Waterbury. Downtown Waterbury is five miles to the southeast of Watertown via Routes 63 and 73.

According to the U.S. Census Bureau, the Watertown CDP has a total area of 2.1 square miles (5.5 km^{2}), of which 0.00 square miles (0.01 km^{2}), or 0.23%, are water.

== Demographics ==
As of the census of 2010, there were 3,574 people, 1,487 households, and 972 families residing in the CDP. The population density was 1,687 inhabitants per square mile (651/km^{2}). There were 1,563 housing units, of which 76, or 4.9%, were vacant. The racial makeup of the CDP was 96.0% White, 1.1% African American, 0.3% American Indian or Alaska Native, 0.9% Asian, 0.7% some other race, and 1.0% from two or more races. Hispanic or Latino of any race were 2.8% of the population.

Of the 1,487 households in the community, 27.3% had children under the age of 18 living with them, 51.0% were headed by married couples living together, 10.7% had a female householder with no husband present, and 34.6% were non-families. 30.1% of all households were made up of individuals, and 12.2% were someone living alone who was 65 years of age or older. The average household size was 2.34, and the average family size was 2.92.

20.2% of the CDP population were under the age of 18, 6.6% were from 18 to 24, 24.5% were from 25 to 44, 32.3% were from 45 to 64, and 16.3% were 65 years of age or older. The median age was 44.1 years. For every 100 females, there were 92.0 males. For every 100 females age 18 and over, there were 89.9 males.

For the period 2013–17, the estimated median annual income for a household in the CDP was $71,250, and the median income for a family was $102,000. Male full-time workers had a median income of $57,385 versus $41,723 for females. About 0% of families and 6.3% of the population were living below the poverty line, including 5.1% of those age 65 or over.
