= Litchfield (borough), Connecticut =

Litchfield, Connecticut
- Borough
- Borough of Litchfield
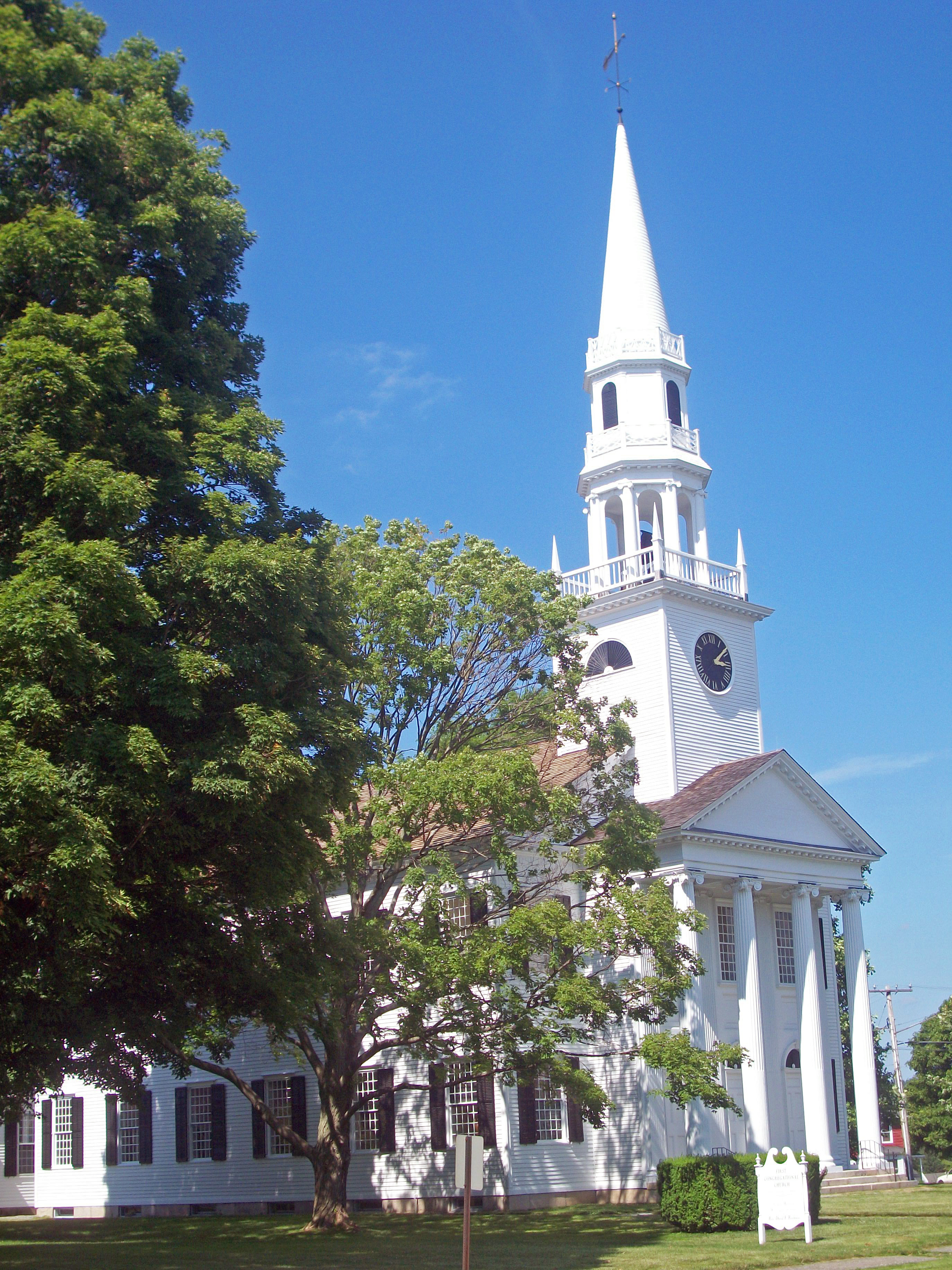
- First Congregational Church, at center of borough

- Coordinates: 41°44′51″N 73°11′17″W
- Country: United States
- U.S. state: Connecticut
- County: Litchfield
- Region: Northwest Hills
- Town: Litchfield
- Incorporated as village: 1818

Area
  - Total: 1.37 sq mi (3.56 km^{2})
  - Land: 1.37 sq mi (3.56 km^{2})
  - Water: 0 sq mi (0.0 km^{2})
- Elevation: 1,060 ft (320 m)

Population (2010)
  - Total: 1,258
  - Density: 917/sq mi (353.9/km^{2})
- Time zone: UTC-5 (EST)
  - Summer (DST): UTC-4 (EDT)
- ZIP Code: 06759
- Area code: 860
- Exchange: 567
- Website: boroughoflitchfield.org

Litchfield is a borough in, and the village center of, the town of Litchfield in Litchfield County, Connecticut, United States. The population was 1,258 at the 2010 census. The entire borough was designated a Connecticut historic district in 1959 by special act of the state General Assembly and is listed on the National Register of Historic Places. Part of the borough is also a National Historic Landmark, the Litchfield Historic District.

== History ==
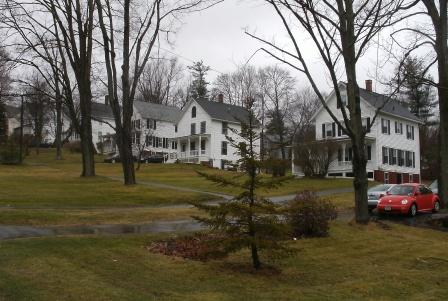
East Street houses, north side

The borough of Litchfield was incorporated as a village in 1818, one of only two villages ever established in the state. On March 21, 1879 it was rechartered as a borough.

=== Old and Historic Litchfield Historic District ===
- Litchfield Historic District (Borough)
- U.S. National Register of Historic Places
- U.S. Historic district
- Location within Connecticut Location within the United States
- Location: Litchfield, Connecticut
- Coordinates: 41°44′35″N 73°11′25″W
- Area: 840 acres (340 ha)
- Architectural style: Greek Revival, Late Victorian
- NRHP reference No.: 78003456
- Added to NRHP: November 29, 1978

In 1959, the entire borough was designated an historic district by a special act of the Connecticut General Assembly, with the name "Old and Historic Litchfield Historic District". It was the first such district in Connecticut. Subsequently, on November 24, 1968, a central portion of the borough was given National Historic Landmark status as the "Litchfield Historic District", and on November 29, 1978, the entire borough was listed on the National Register of Historic Places (NRHP) as an historic district.

The 1978 NRHP listing was an 840-acre (340 ha) area including 459 buildings.

As a result of the state historic district designation, exterior changes to structures in the district that are visible from a public way must be reviewed and approved by the Litchfield Historic District Commission. The review process is intended to prevent changes that would be "incongruous with the District's historic and architectural character."

== Geography ==
Litchfield borough is at the center of the town of Litchfield and of Litchfield County. U.S. Route 202 passes through the center of the borough at the Litchfield Green, leading northeast 5 miles (8 km) to Torrington and southwest 18 miles (29 km) to New Milford. Route 63 runs north from the Litchfield Green 6 miles (10 km) to Goshen and south 10 miles (16 km) to Watertown, and Route 118 leads east 8 miles (13 km) to Harwinton.

According to the United States Census Bureau, the borough has a total area of 1.4 square miles (3.6 km^{2}), all land.

== Demographics ==
As of the census of 2000, there were 1,328 people, 573 households, and 350 families residing in the borough. The population density was 368.9/km^{2} (953.5/mi^{2}). There were 624 housing units at an average density of 173.3/km^{2} (448.0/mi^{2}). The racial makeup of the borough was 97.97% White, 0.30% Black or African American, 0.15% Native American, 0.30% Asian, 0.38% from other races, and 0.90% from two or more races. Hispanic or Latino of any race were 1.51% of the population.

There were 573 households, out of which 28.3% had children under the age of 18 living with them, 50.8% were married couples living together, 7.3% had a female householder with no husband present, and 38.9% were non-families. 35.4% of all households were made up of individuals, and 18.3% had someone living alone who was 65 years of age or older. The average household size was 2.24 and the average family size was 2.94.

In the borough the population was spread out, with 22.6% under the age of 18, 4.0% from 18 to 24, 23.3% from 25 to 44, 29.7% from 45 to 64, and 20.5% who were 65 years of age or older. The median age was 45 years. For every 100 females, there were 87.0 males. For every 100 females age 18 and over, there were 84.6 males.

The median income for a household in the borough was $58,333, and the median income for a family was $77,843. Males had a median income of $59,375 versus $35,156 for females. The per capita income for the borough was $38,789. About 4.6% of families and 4.8% of the population were below the poverty line, including 5.5% of those under age 18 and 5.3% of those age 65 or over.

== Education ==
Residents are zoned to Litchfield Public Schools, including Litchfield High School.
