= Naugatuck River =

Naugatuck River Great River, Nawcatuck
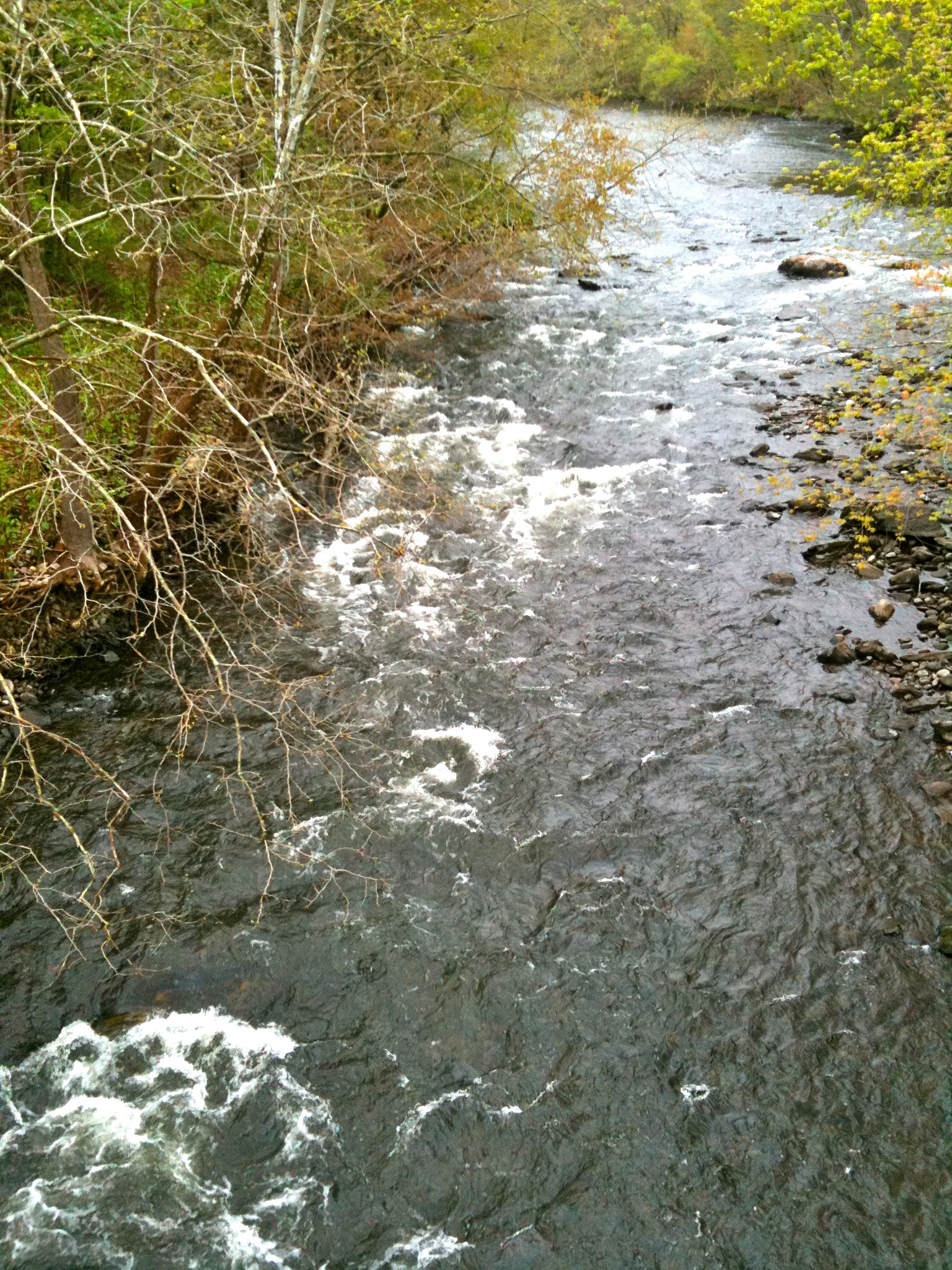
- Naugatuck River in Oakville from Whitestone Cliffs Trail road walk over Frost Bridge - CT Route 262
- Native name: Neggutuck (Algonquin)

Location
- Country: United States
- State: Connecticut
- Region: Litchfield County and New Haven County
- Cities: Torrington, Litchfield, Harwinton, Thomaston, Watertown, Waterbury, Naugatuck, Beacon Falls, Seymour, Ansonia, Derby

Physical characteristics
- Source
  - location: Confluence of West and East Branches Naugatuck River in Torrington, Connecticut
  - coordinates: 41°47′49″N 073°07′00″W
  - elevation: 526 ft (160 m)
- Mouth: Confluence with Housatonic River
  - location: Derby, Connecticut
  - coordinates: 41°18′49″N 073°04′50″W
  - elevation: 3 ft (0.91 m)

Basin features
- Tributaries
  - left: East Branch Naugatuck River, Leadmine Brook, Spruce Brook, Hancock Brook, Mad River, Hockanum Brook, Bladens River
  - right: West Branch Naugatuck River, Northfield Brook, Branch Brook, Steele Brook, Hop Brook, Little River, Long Meadow Pond Brook

The Naugatuck River is a 40.2-mile-long (64.7 km) river in the U.S. state of Connecticut. Its waters carve out the Naugatuck River Valley in the western reaches of the state, flowing generally due south and eventually emptying into the Housatonic River at Derby, Connecticut, and thence 11 miles (18 km) to Long Island Sound. The Plume and Atwood Dam in Thomaston, completed in 1960 following the Great Flood of 1955, creates a reservoir on the river and is the last barrier to salmon and trout migrating up from the sea.

== History ==
Various Algonquian bands, often included in the Wappinger tribe, originally inhabited the Naugatuck River Valley. In fact, the name "Naugatuck" is derived from an Algonquian term meaning "lone tree by the fishing place". One early 19th-century author explained that this name originally referred to a specific tree along the river in the area of modern-day Beacon Falls, but came to be applied broadly to the entire river over time. The valley was later settled in the 17th century by English colonists. Given its rocky soil, which was not good for farming, and the high potential for water power, the Naugatuck Valley became an industrialized area in the 19th century. It has been associated with the brass and copper industries.

== Watershed and course ==
After winding through rural forested areas, the two branches of the Naugatuck River enter downtown Torrington and join just north of East Albert Street at about 530 feet (160 m) above sea level. The East Branch of the Naugatuck River is 11.4 miles (18.3 km) long and originates in Winchester as a tributary of Lake Winchester at an elevation of about 1,250 feet (380 m). The West Branch, 5.9 miles (9.5 km) long, begins at the confluence of Jakes Brook, Hart Brook and Hall Meadow Brook in the western part of Torrington, at an elevation of 800 feet (240 m).

From this point on, the Naugatuck River has been followed by early paths and roadways and is now followed by Connecticut Route 8. The river enters a forested, hilly area between Connecticut Route 118 and Thomaston. The largely industrialized cities of the Naugatuck River Valley were developed on each side of the river, with periodic sections of forested areas, before it enters the Housatonic River at Derby, at about 3 feet (0.91 m) above sea level.

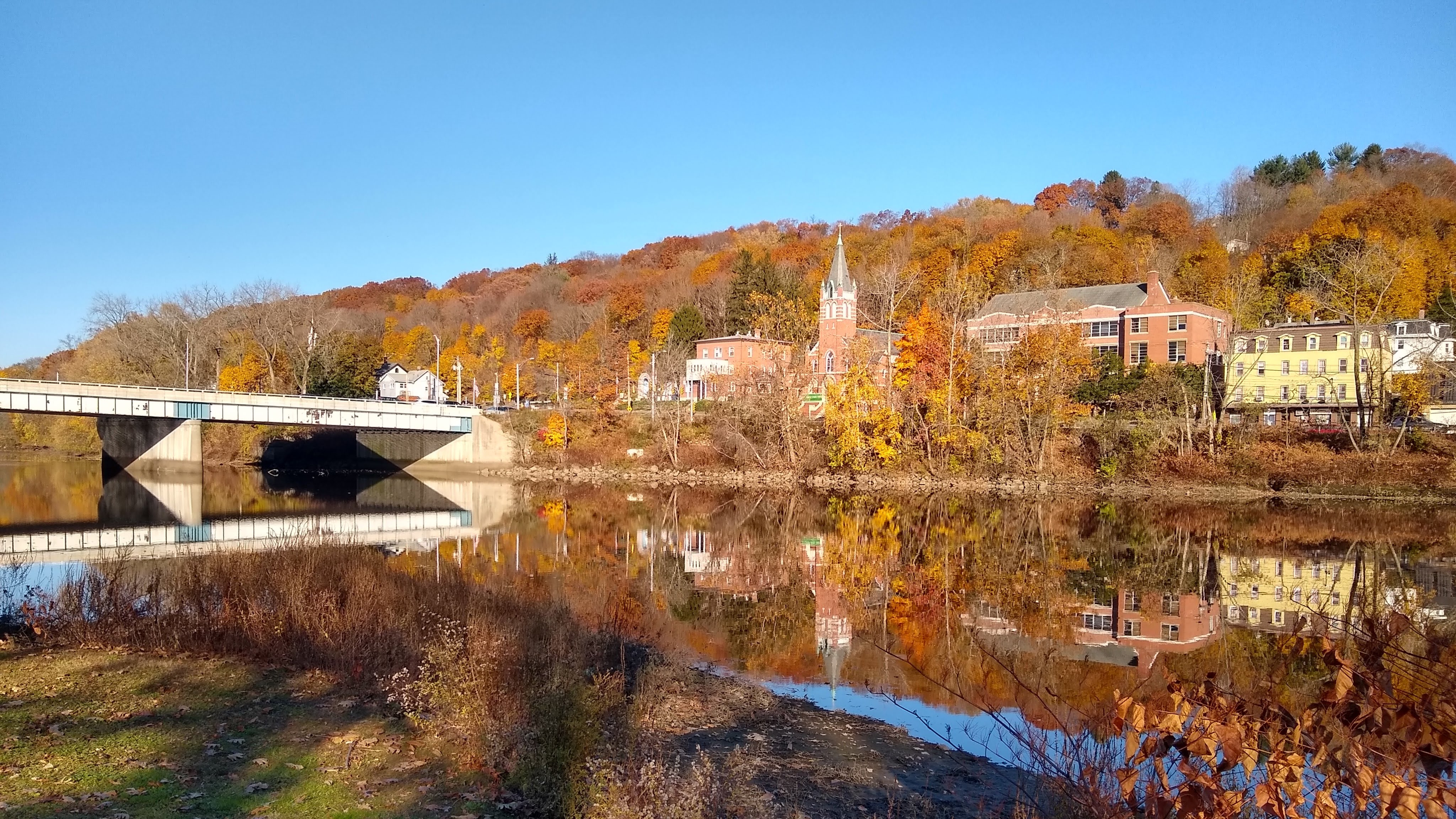
The river in Derby, Connecticut from the Derby Greenway

== Ecology and conservation ==
From the early 19th century, when towns along the Naugatuck River began industrializing and dumping industrial waste and sewage into its waters, it gradually gained a reputation as "Connecticut's dirtiest river." Cleanup efforts from the 1980s into the 2000s were successful in removing much of the most obvious contamination. However, occasional sewage spills continued to occur, and a 2017 study identified the presence of phthalates in the river. The Naugatuck is not used as a source of human drinking water.

As part of the Housatonic River watershed, the Naugatuck River historically hosted the southernmost Atlantic salmon (Salmo salar) migrations. Historical runs of anadromous fish also included native American shad (Alosa sapidissima, Connecticut's state fish), alewife (Alosa pseudoharengus) and blueback herring (Alosa aestivalis). Dam construction for hydropower, cooling and rinse water, and boiler water for industry began circa 1763 and continued during the industrial revolution of the 1800s. These dams, as well as wastewater from the towns that grew up around factories along the river, contributed to the extirpation of many species of fish. Over time and with the closing of many of the factories, the dams ceased to provide hydropower or serve any other economic purpose. The Anaconda Dam (Waterbury), Freight Street Dam (Waterbury), Union City Dam (Naugatuck) and the Platts Mill Dam (Naugatuck) were removed in 1999, while the Kinneytown Dam was bypassed with a fish ladder that same year. The Chase Brass Dam, between Waterbury and Thomaston, was removed in 2004. A fish bypass channel, the first of its kind in New England, now permits fish to migrate past the Tingue Dam and opens an additional 32 miles (51 km) of the river to anadromous fish migration. The installation of the fish bypass on the Tingue Dam in Seymour leaves only the Plume and Atwood Dam in Thomaston as the last barrier on the river to fish migration.

The State of Connecticut Department of Energy and Environmental Protection (DEEP) stocks surplus Atlantic salmon (Salmo salar) from the Connecticut River restoration effort in the Naugatuck River each fall. DEEP also stocks several salmonid species including native brook trout (Salvelinus fontinalis) and non-native sea-run brown trout (Salmo trutta) and rainbow trout (Oncorhynchus mykiss).

== Recreation and activities ==
The Naugatuck River is a popular destination for fishing in northwestern Connecticut, though not on the same scale as the Farmington or Housatonic rivers. The Connecticut Department of Environmental Protection stocks the river with broodstock Atlantic Salmon between Route 118 in Harwinton/Litchfield and the Thomaston Dam, and from southern Naugatuck to Beacon Falls. The Naugatuck has a trout management area between Route 118 and the Thomaston Dam. It is considered a "trophy trout stream" the rest of its length between the confluence of the East and West Branches and the Kinneytown Dam in Seymour.

Landmarks of note associated with the Naugatuck include Reynolds Bridge, an open-spandrel concrete arch bridge in Thomaston which carries Waterbury Road over the river. Built in 1928, the crossing is listed on the National Register of Historic Places.

== See also ==
- List of rivers of Connecticut
