= Connecticut Route 209 =

State highway in Litchfield County, Connecticut, US

Route 209
- Map of Litchfield County in northwestern Connecticut with Route 209 highlighted in red

Route information
- Maintained by CTDOT
- Length: 2.93 mi (4.72 km)
- Existed: 1963–present

Major junctions
- South end: Route 109 in Morris
- North end: US 202 in Litchfield

Location
- Country: United States
- State: Connecticut
- Counties: Litchfield

Highway system
- Connecticut State Highway System; Interstate; US; State; SSR; SR; Scenic
← Route 207	→ Route 213

Route 209 is a rural state highway in northwestern Connecticut, running from the Lakeside part of Morris to the borough of Bantam in the town of Litchfield.

== Route description ==
Route 209 begins at an intersection with Route 109 east of the Lakeside section of Morris. It heads north along the west shore of Bantam Lake for 1.9 miles (3.1 km) into the town of Litchfield. After crossing the Bantam River 0.9 miles (1.4 km) later, it soon ends at an intersection with US 202 within the borough of Bantam. Route 209 is known as Bantam Lake Road for its entire length.

== History ==
The road connecting the town of Morris with the borough of Bantam going alongside Bantam Lake was designated as a secondary state highway known as Highway 310 in 1922. In the 1932 state highway renumbering, old Highway 310 was renumbered to Route 109. In 1963, Route 109 was reconfigured such that it went west toward Washington instead. The former section of Route 109 along the west shore of Bantam Lake was renumbered to Route 209. The route has had no changes since.

== Junction list ==
The entire route is in Litchfield County.

Location	mi	km	Destinations	Notes
Morris	0.00	0.00	Route 109 – Morris, Washington	Southern terminus
Litchfield	2.93	4.72	US 202 – Litchfield, New Milford	Northern terminus
1.000 mi = 1.609 km; 1.000 km = 0.621 mi
