= Bantam River =

Bantam River (Also called Cemetery Brook, Doctor Buell Brook, East Branch of Shepaug, and other names)
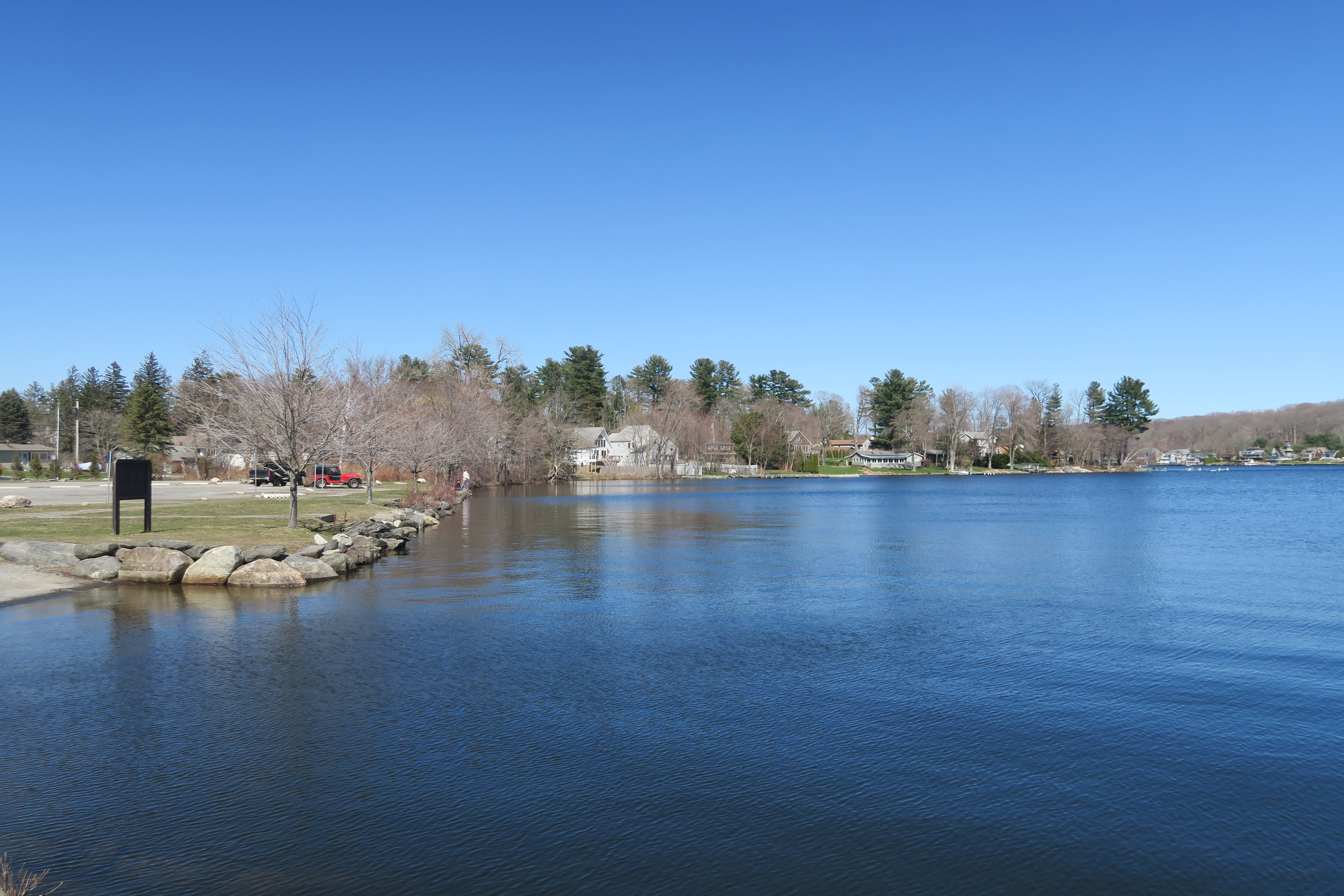
- Bantam Lake, midway point on Bantam River Headwaters and mouth of Bantam River in Connecticut

Location
- Country: United States
- States: Connecticut
- Towns: Goshen, Litchfield, Morris, Washington

Physical characteristics
- Source: Marsh above Litchfield Reservoir
  - location: Goshen, Massachusetts
  - coordinates: (41°49′18″N 73°13′07″W)
- Mouth: Shepaug River
  - location: Washington, Connecticut
  - coordinates: (41°40′59″N 73°18′12″W)
  - elevation: 604 ft (184 m)
- Length: Bantam Lake Inlet: 10.88 mi (17.51 km); Bantam Lake Outlet: 7.96 mi (12.81 km)
- Basin size: 25,732.28 acres (10,413.48 ha)
- Width
  - maximum: Inlet: 25 feet (7.6 m); Outlet: 60 feet (18 m)

Basin features
- River system: Housatonic
- Tributaries
  - right: Ivy Mountain Brook, West Branch
- Gradient: 37.69 fpm (Inlet); 38.42 fpm (Outlet)

The Bantam River is a two-part, southward-flowing stream located in northwest Connecticut in the United States. The full river comprises two streams that flow into and out of Bantam Lake and that are referred to as Bantam Lake Inlet and Bantam Lake Outlet. The two sections of the river enter and leave Bantam Lake at points approximately 2,800 feet (850 m) apart on the lake's north shore. The river drains an area of more than 25,000 acres (10,000 ha) in the towns of Goshen, Litchfield, Morris, and Washington. Its total course is approximately 18 miles (29 km) in length. The river rises in the marsh area north of the Litchfield Reservoir and empties into the Shepaug River. It forms the southern boundary of Mount Tom State Park.
