= Robert Clark Morris =

American lawyer

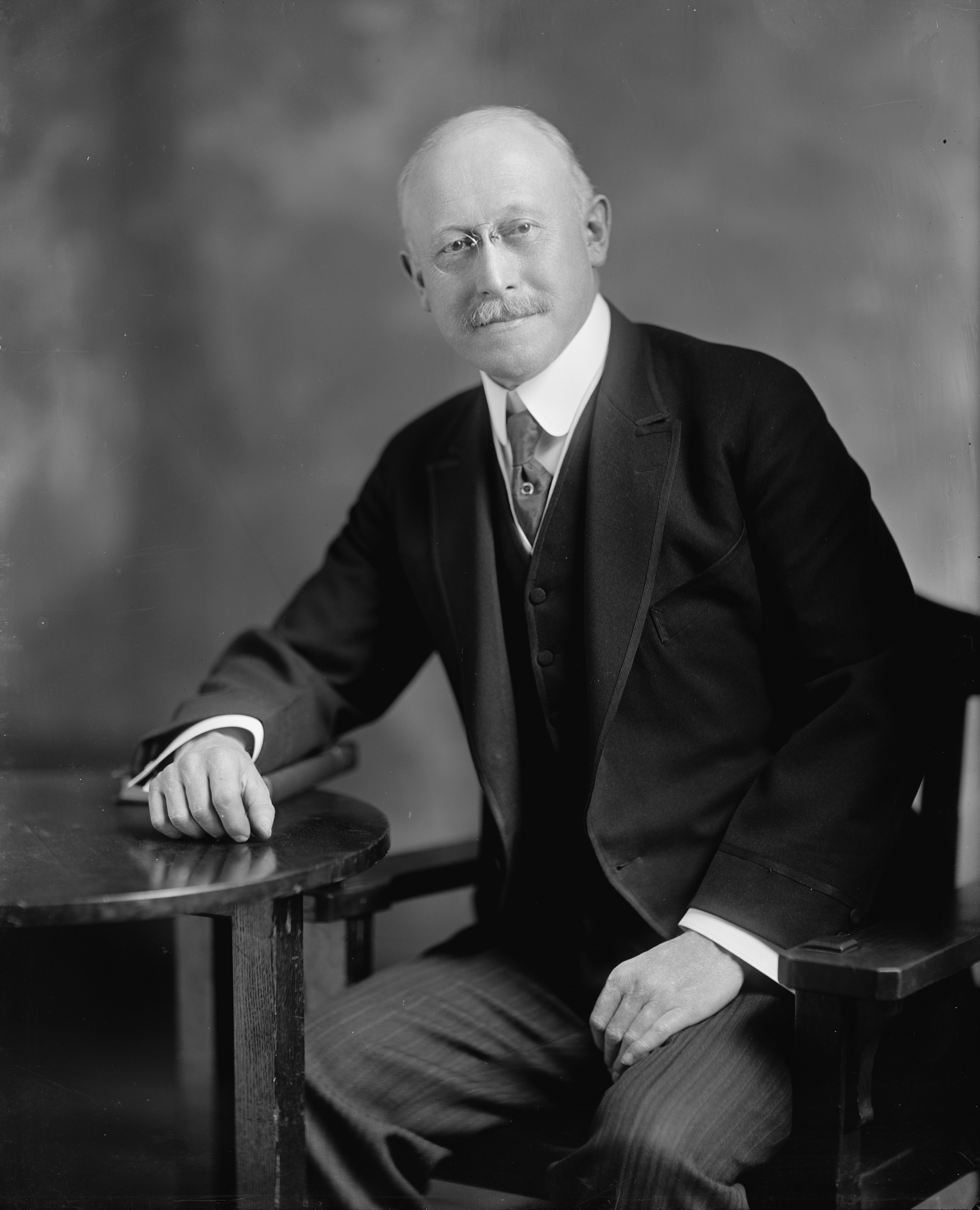
- Born: November 19, 1869; Bridgeport, Connecticut, U.S.
- Died: October 13, 1938 (aged 68); Bridgeport, Connecticut, U.S.
- Education: Yale Law School
- Occupations: Lawyer; politician; educator
- Political party: Republican
- Spouses: Alice Augusta Parmelee (m. 1890; div. 1930); Aline Brothier (m. 1931; died 1932)
- Parent(s): Dwight Morris; Grace Josephine Clark
- Relatives: James Morris III (grandfather)

Robert Clark Morris (November 19, 1869 – October 13, 1938) was an American lawyer, politician, and founder of the Aline Brothier Morris Fund. He was the son of American Civil War colonel Dwight Morris, and the grandson of James Morris III, who served as an officer in the American Revolutionary War.

== Early life ==
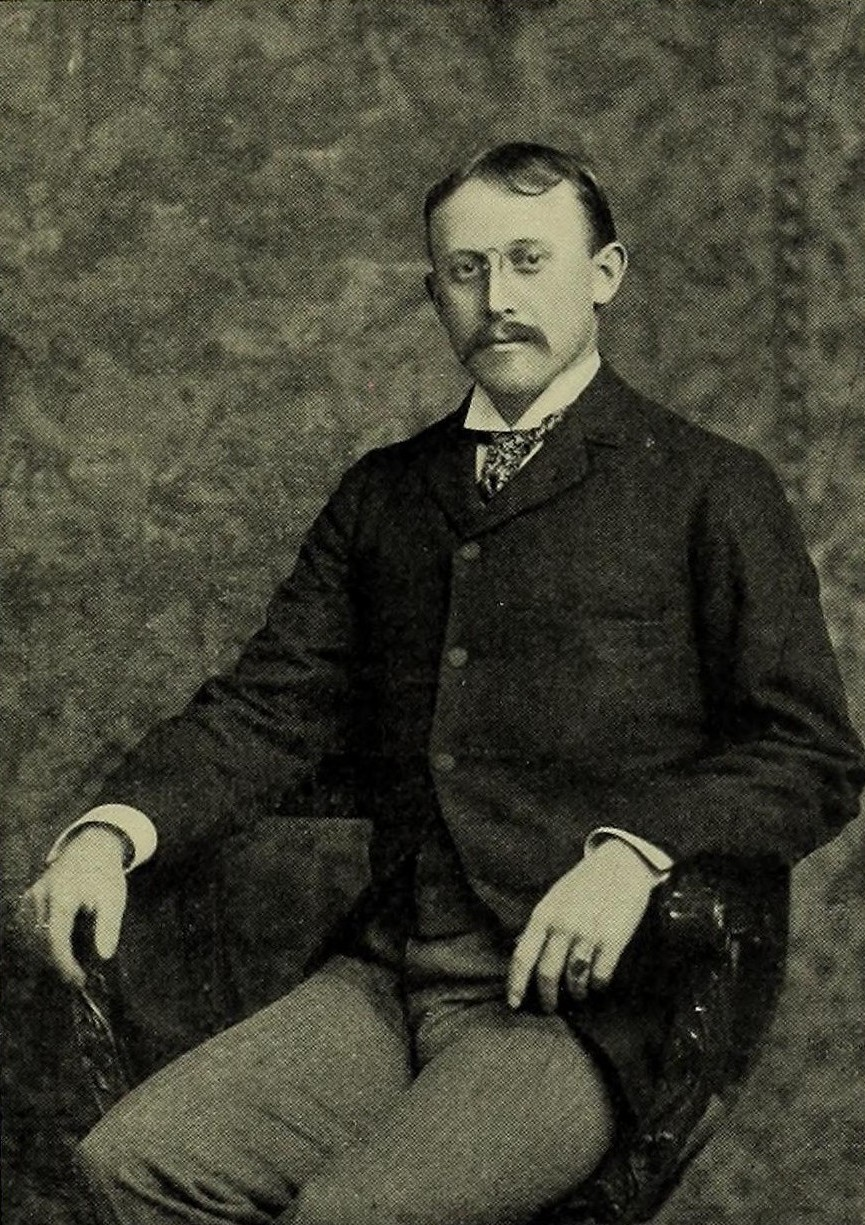
Morris as a young man, c. 1899

Robert Clark Morris was born on November 19, 1869, at "Lindencroft," his parents' home in Bridgeport, Connecticut. The property, purchased only a month earlier, had previously belonged to P. T. Barnum. His parents, Col. Dwight Morris and Grace Josephine (née Clark) Morris, had met in France while his father was serving as United States Consul General at Le Havre. They married in Paris in 1868, before returning to Bridgeport. Col. Morris was a veteran of the American Civil War, known for leading the 14th Connecticut Infantry Regiment during the Battle of Antietam. Morris's paternal grandfather, James Morris III, was the founder of the Morris Academy, an early coeducational institution founded in Morris, Connecticut.

Morris graduated from Yale Law School in June 1890 with a Bachelor of Laws degree, and was admitted to the New Haven County Bar later that month. On June 28 he left for Europe with his new wife, Alice, where he spent two years studying continental jurisprudence. After his return in 1892 he received the degree of Master in Law from Yale; the following year he was awarded Doctor of Civil Law. In 1894 he was admitted to the New York Bar and moved to New York City where he opened his own private practice. Although life as a lawyer was very busy, Morris still found time to teach. In 1895, Yale invited him to lecture on French law before the Law Department of the University. Over the next nineteen years, Morris taught several subjects at the school. For nine years he taught French law, for eight more years he taught international arbitration and procedure, and for the final two years he lectured on government and citizenship.

== Career ==
In 1903, President Theodore Roosevelt appointed Morris to represent the United States before the U.S. and Venezuelan Claims Commission in Caracas, in which the U.S. attempted to settle a complicated claim by European countries against Venezuela. Later, in 1916, Morris was involved in the case of Bolo Pasha, a notorious French traitor of World War I. He found evidence that Bolo had persuaded Germany to hand over millions of dollars to him, which he would use to influence the French press in favor of a German peace. Bolo had been staying in New York while he made secret connections with the German Ambassador in Washington. After ten days of intensive work by the New York State attorney general, to whom Morris served as counsel, indisputable evidence was uncovered of Bolo's treachery that led to his arrest and execution in Paris.

After World War I, President Warren G. Harding assigned him to the Mixed Claims Commission of the United States and Germany. It was his responsibility to present claims of the United States and its citizens against Germany under the terms of the World War I Peace Treaty. Over the course of two years he surveyed, classified, and initiated formal action on 12,416 separate claims which together were worth close to a billion and a half dollars.

== Personal life ==
On June 24, 1890, Morris married Alice Augusta Parmelee, the daughter of Andrew Yelverton Parmelee, in New Haven. They divorced in 1930.

On May 30, 1931, he married Adelina "Aline" Brothier, the daughter of Francois and Mary (née Millet) Brothier, in Greenwich. She died on October 6, 1932, of uremic poisoning, and was buried in Mountain Grove Cemetery, Bridgeport.
