= Camp Columbia State Park/State Forest =

Recreation area in Connecticut, United States

Camp Columbia State Park/ State Forest
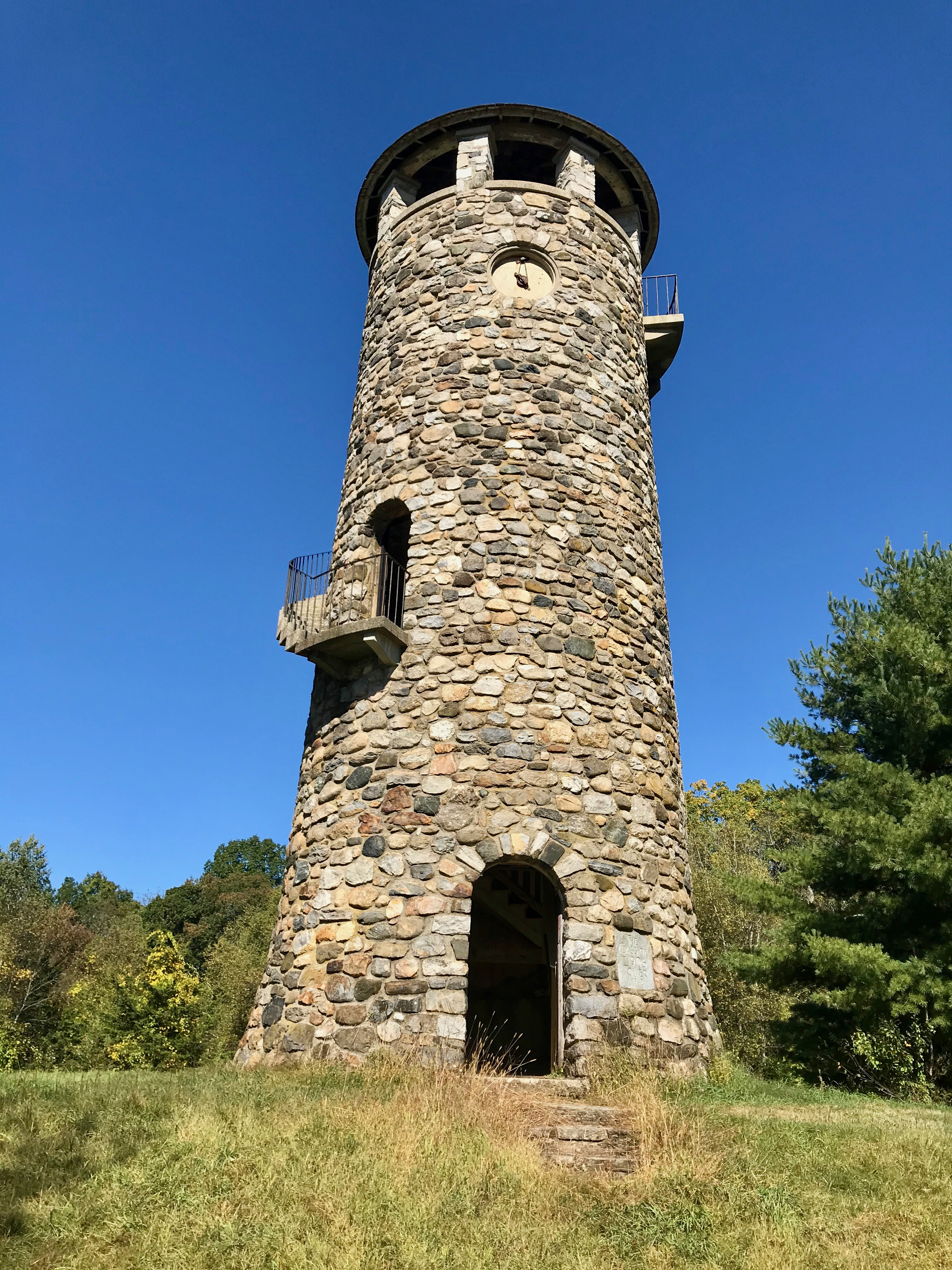
- Camp Columbia State Park's observation tower bequeathed by the Class Of 1906

- Location within Connecticut Location within the United States
- Location: Morris, Connecticut, United States
- Coordinates: 41°40′37″N 73°13′26″W
- Area: 591 acres (239 ha)
- Elevation: 1,024 ft (312 m)
- Established: 2000
- Administrator: Connecticut Department of Energy and Environmental Protection
- Website: Camp Columbia State Park/ State Forest

Camp Columbia State Park/State Forest is a public recreation area and state forest located in the town of Morris in Litchfield County, Connecticut. The 600-acre (240 ha) site was once the rural campus of Columbia University's Engineering Department. The majority of the property has been designated as a state forest; the acreage designated as a state historic park includes the frontage on Bantam Lake and the site of the former university buildings. It is managed by the Connecticut Department of Energy and Environmental Protection.

== History ==
The area was primarily farmland until 1903 when it was purchased by Columbia University for use as a summer camp where engineering and surveying students could receive practical field experience. The camp remained in near continuous use for 80 years until closing down in 1983. During World War I, the property became the site of combat training for college students who sought officer commissions. Military exercises included simulated warfare with real gunfire and the digging of trenches. Remnants of the trenches dug during the training are still evident on the property. Counted among the dignitaries reported to have visited the campus is President Dwight D. Eisenhower, who is said to have hunted there while he was president of Columbia University. The state of Connecticut purchased the land from the university in 2000; it was dedicated as Camp Columbia State Forest and State Historic Park in 2004.

== Activities and amenities ==
The park adjoins a finger of 948-acre (384 ha) Bantam Lake known as South Bay. There are more than 3 miles (4.8 km) of recreational trails open to the public for hiking, mountain biking, cross-country skiing, and snowshoeing. The property is also used for bird watching; hunting is permitted in the state forest. Parking is available in a grassy lot beside Route 109.

Other than the remains of building foundations only two structures on the property are still standing: the "Class of 1906" observation tower (dedicated in 1942) and the "Instrument House".

== Gallery ==
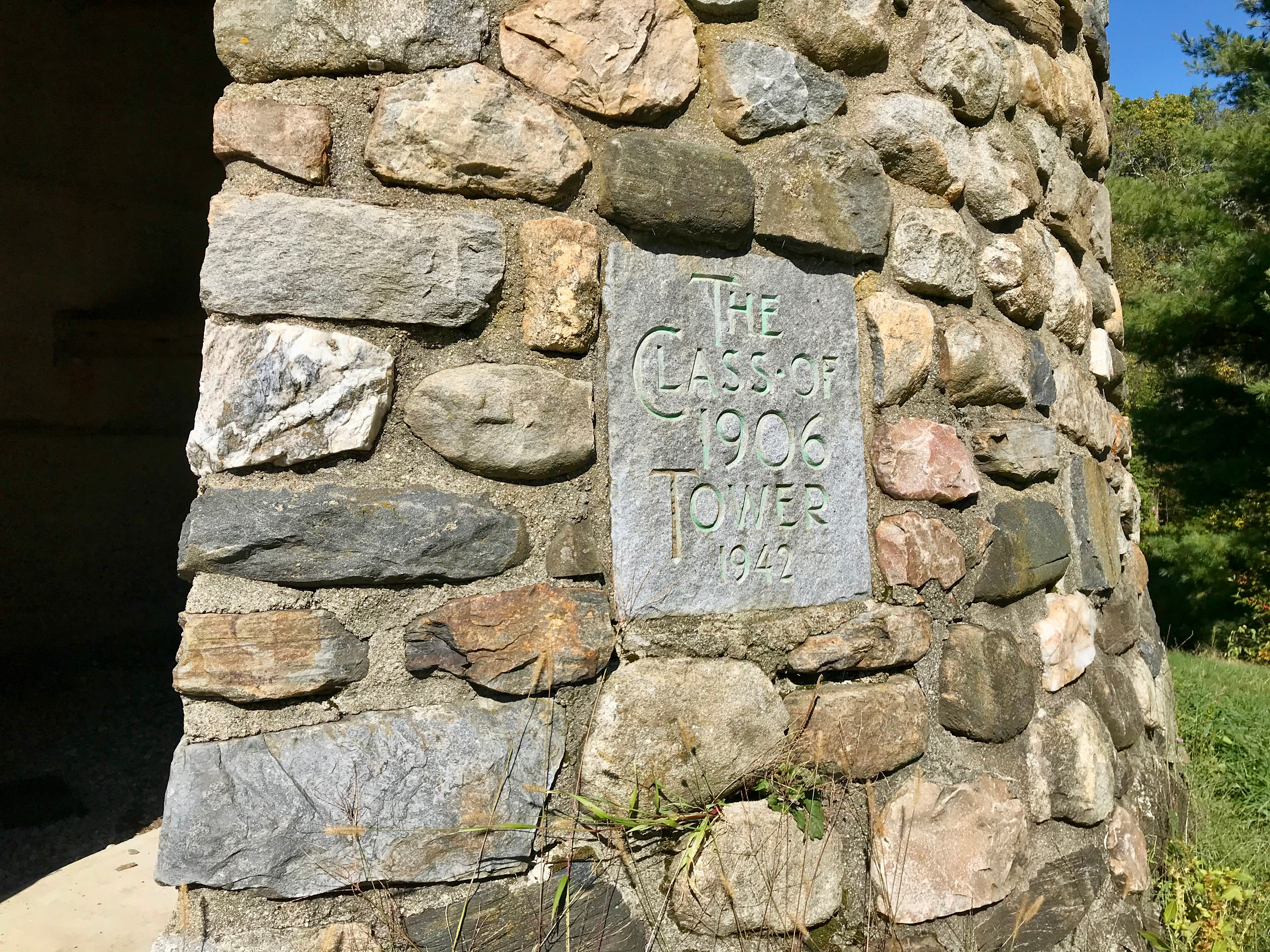
"Class of 1906 Tower 1942" cornerstone.

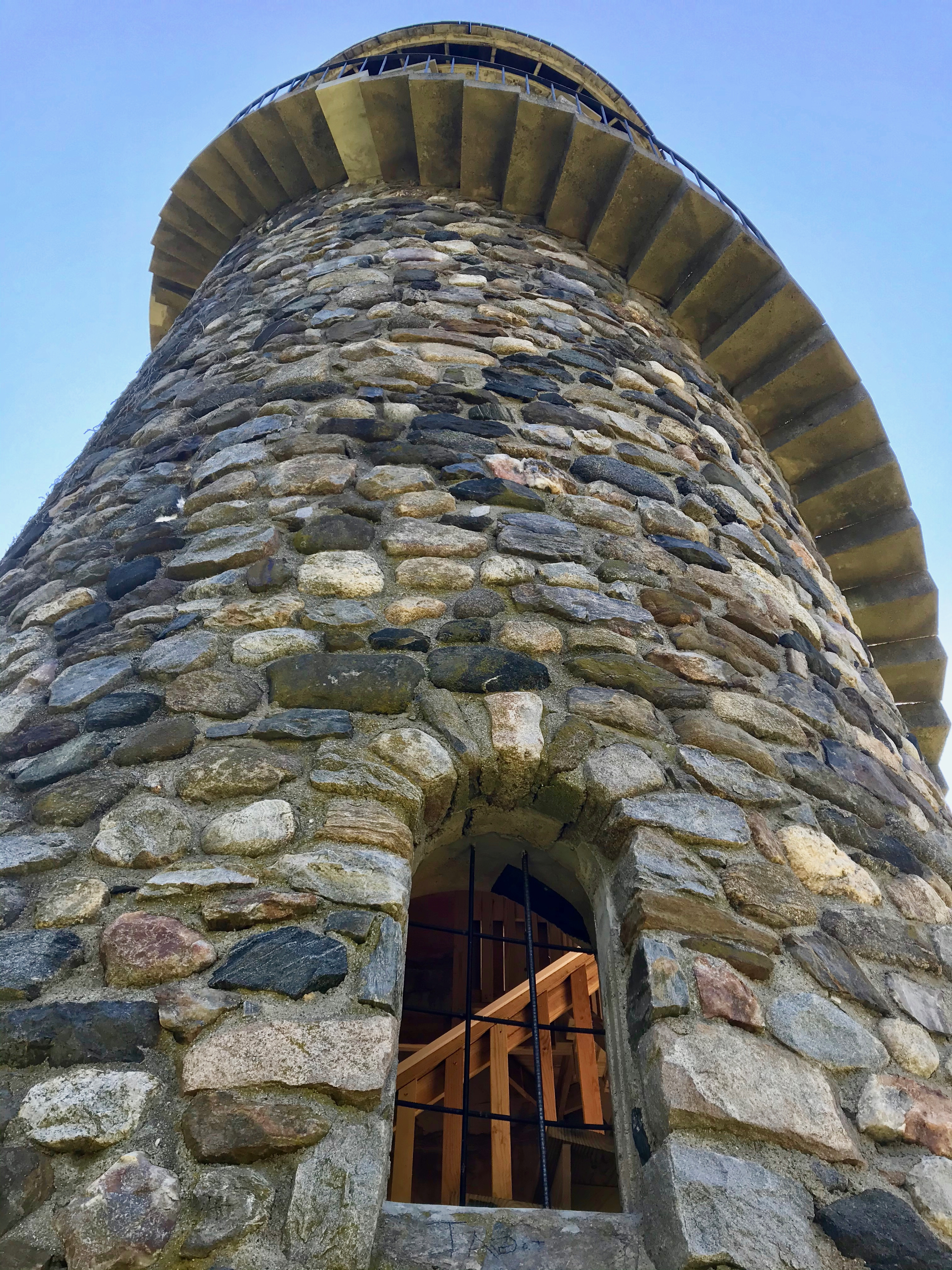
A view of both the tower's inside and outside staircases.

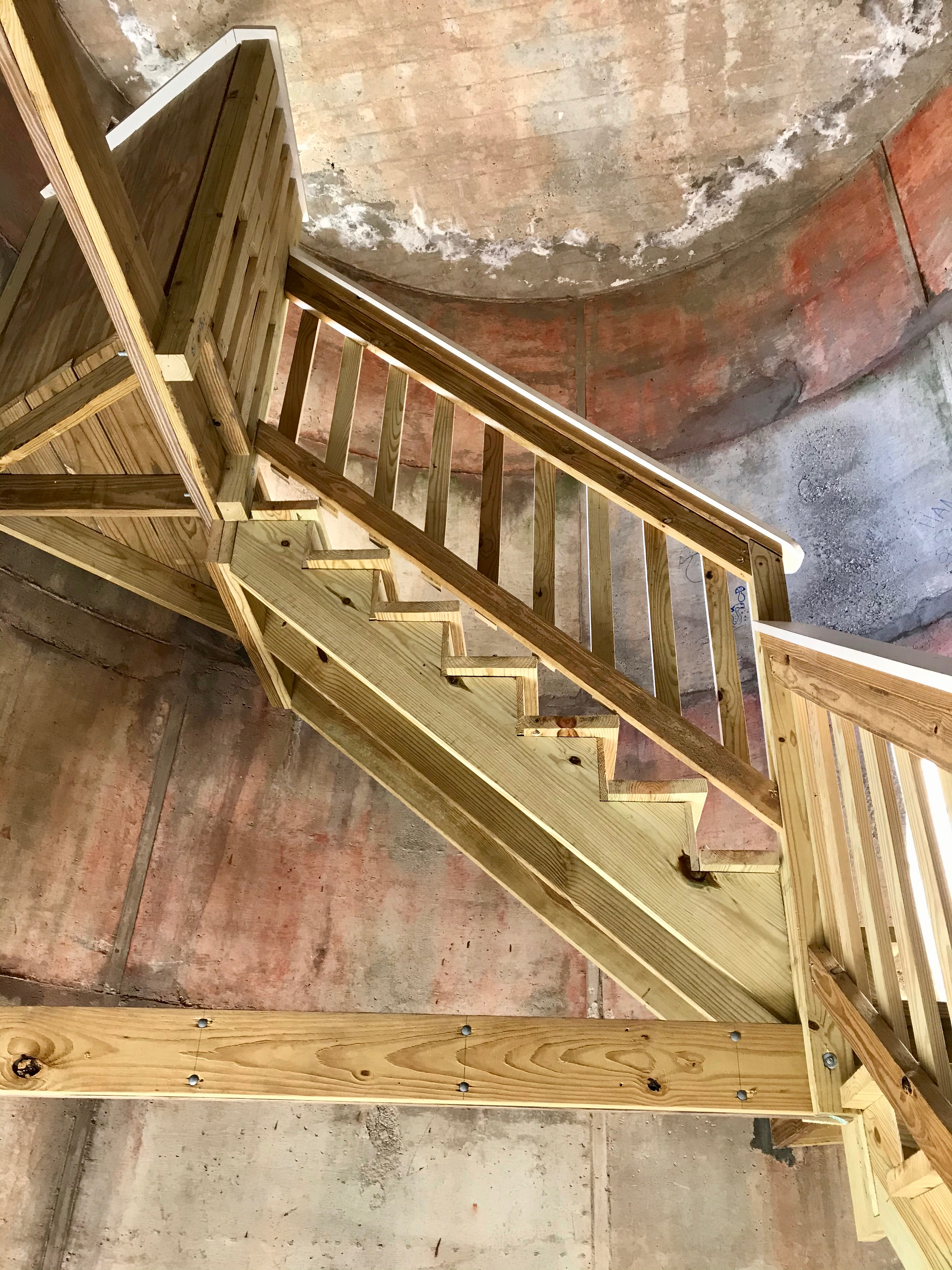
Inside view of the tower's renovations and the wooden staircase.

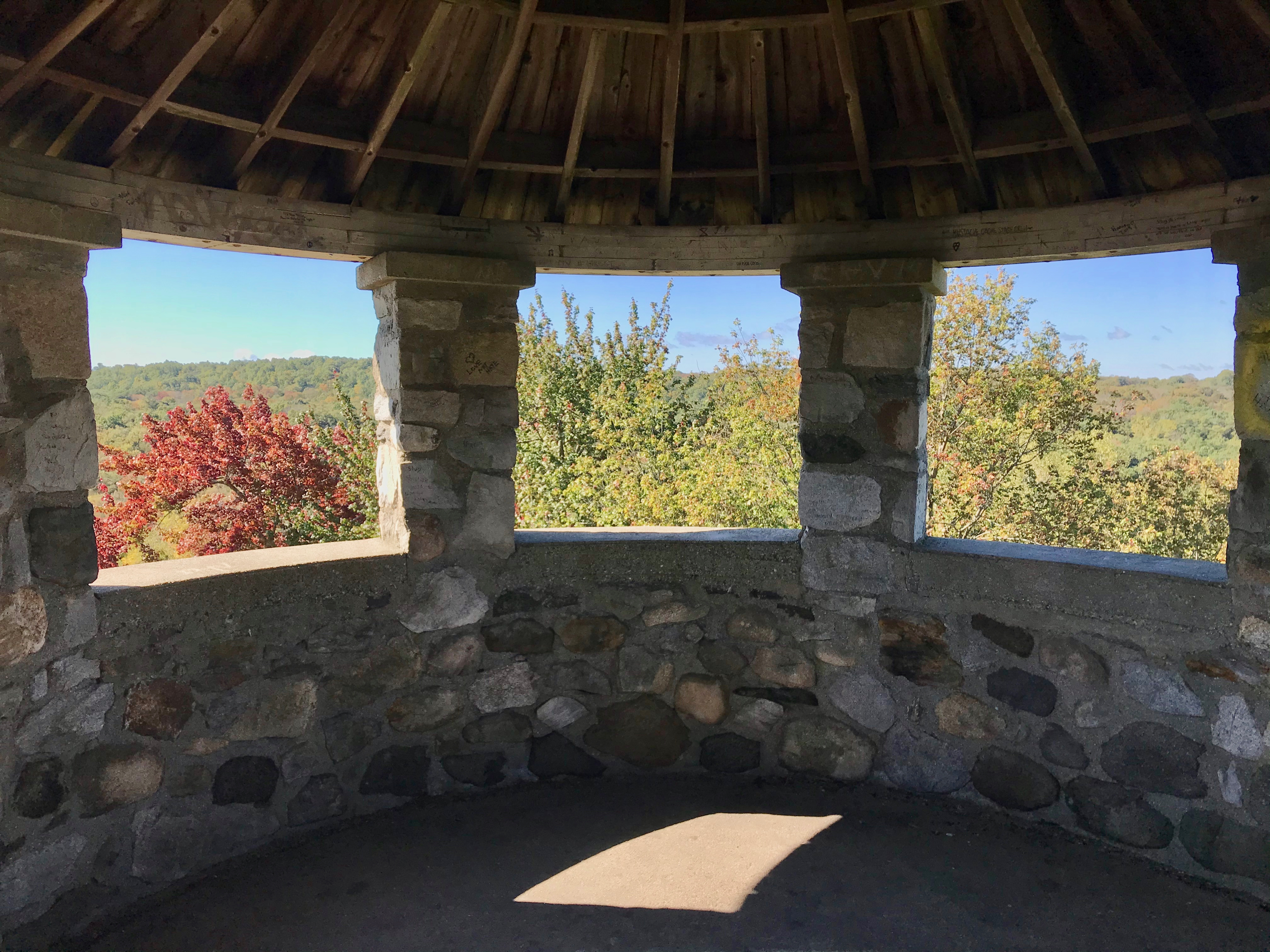
A view from the tower's windows in autumn.

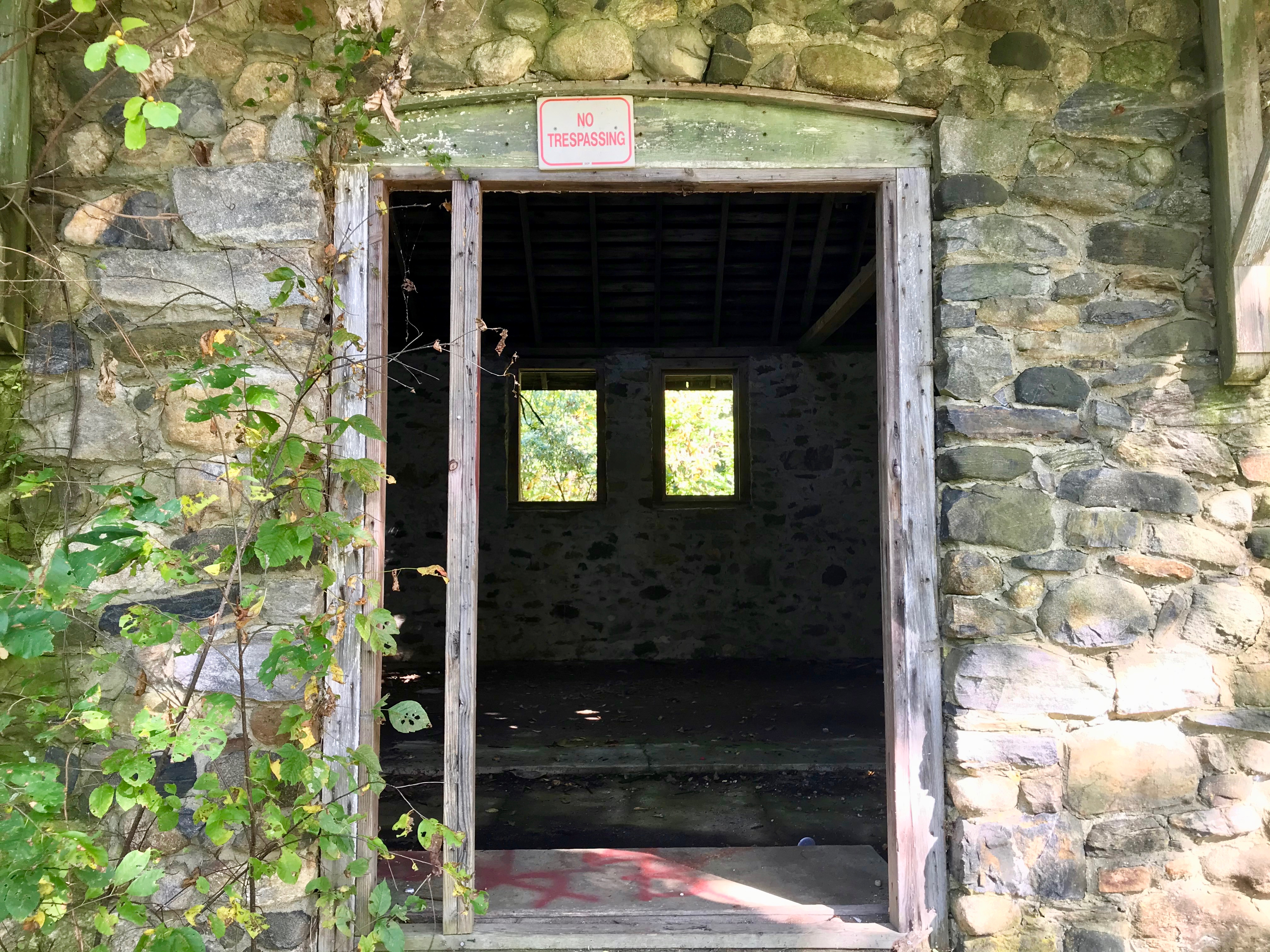
Camp Columbia's "Instrument House" Front Door.

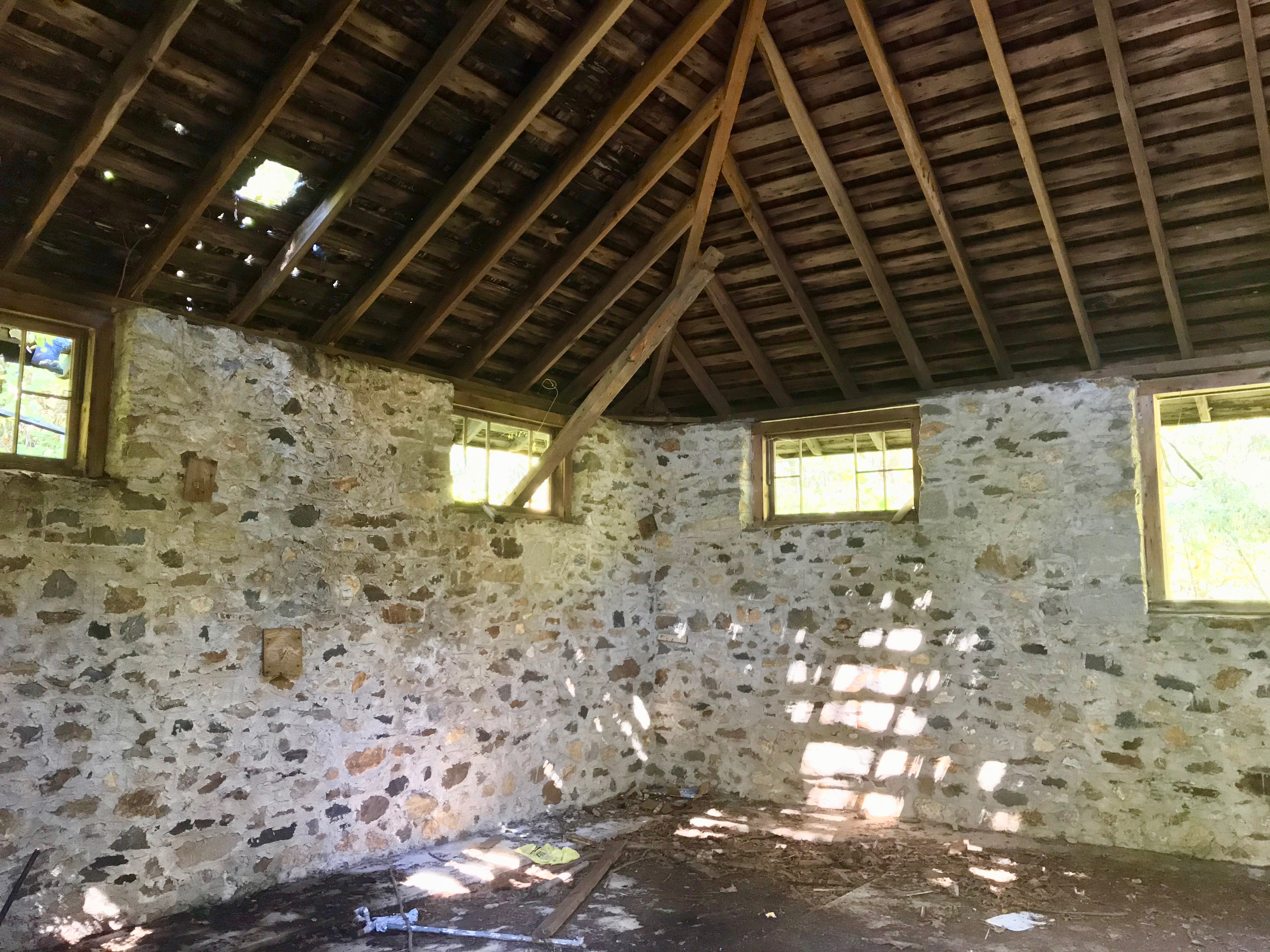
Camp Columbia's "Instrument House" inside.

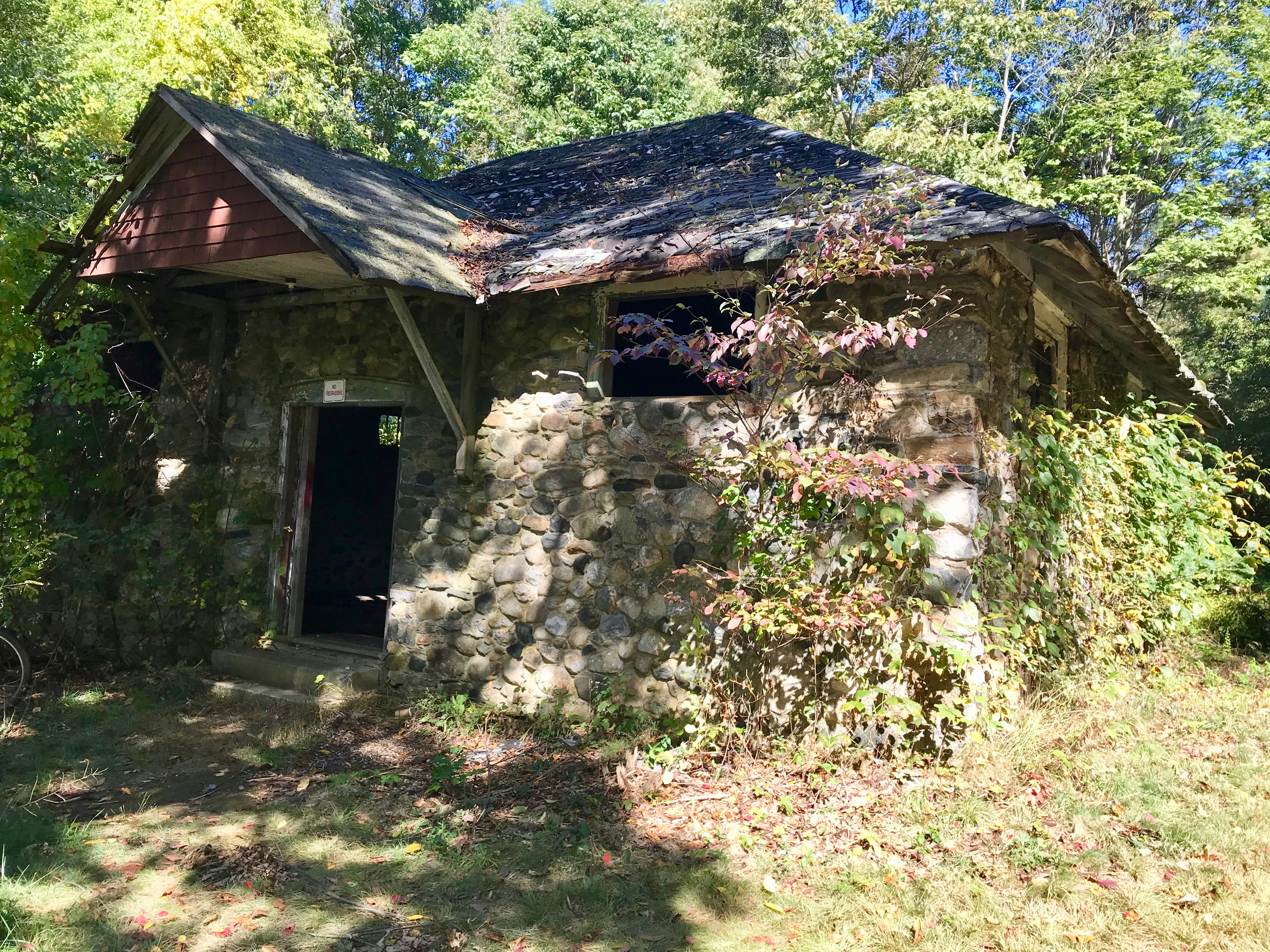
Camp Columbia's "Instrument House" view from the outside.

== Video resources ==
- The full and complete hundred year history of Camp Columbia when it was an educational institution for Columbia University Produced by Howard Vreeland, Camp Columbia's last director in the 1990s.
