= Dwight Morris =

American colonel

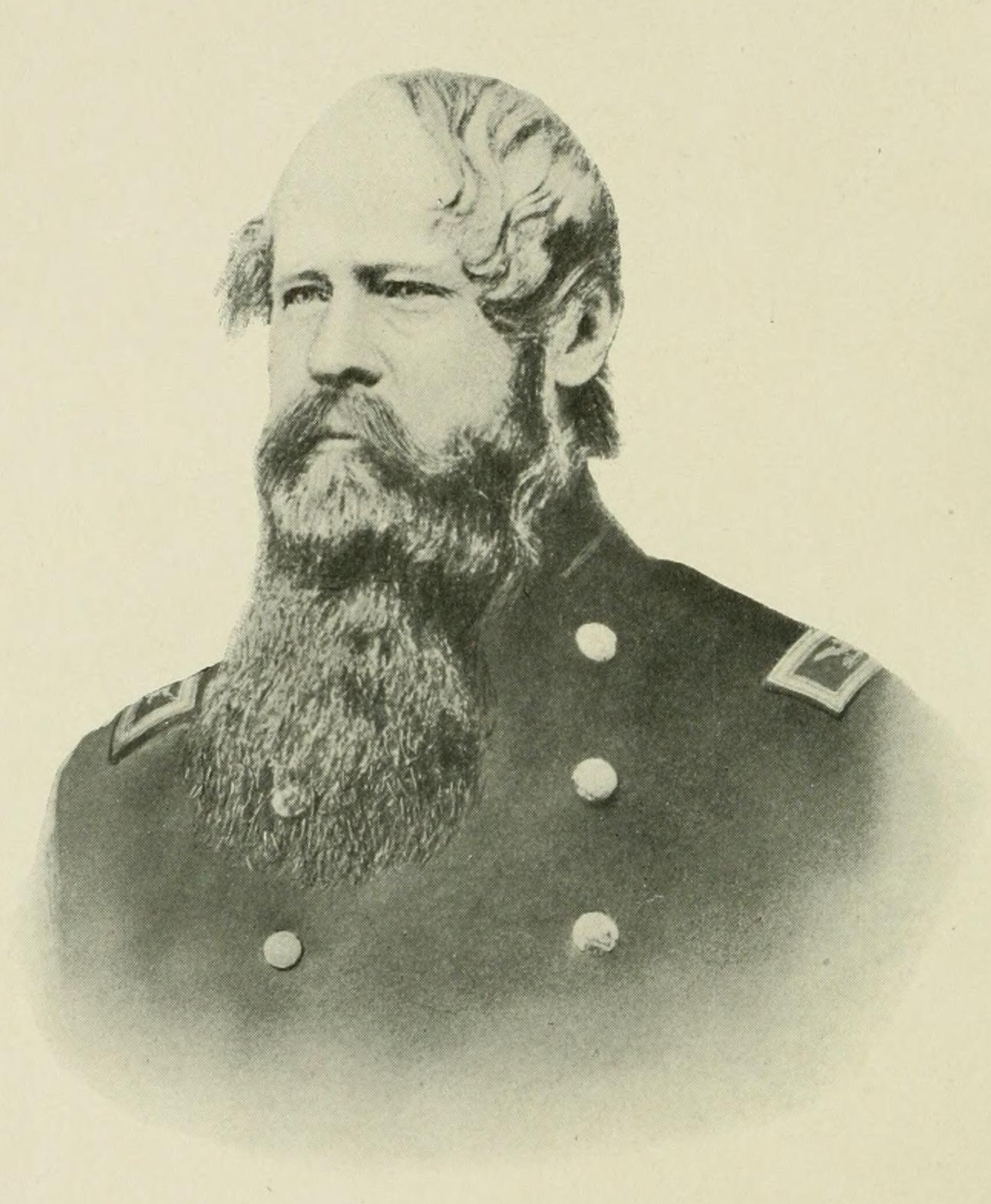
- Dwight Morris during the Civil War

Secretary of the State of Connecticut
- In office January 3, 1877 – January 9, 1879
- Governor: Richard D. Hubbard
- Preceded by: Marvin H. Sanger
- Succeeded by: David Torrance

Personal details
- Born: Timothy Dwight Morris; November 22, 1817 South Farms, Connecticut, U.S.
- Died: September 26, 1894 (aged 76) Bridgeport, Connecticut, U.S.
- Party: Democratic (from 1873)
- Other political affiliations: Liberal Republican (1870–1872); National Union (1864–1867); Republican (from 1856); Whig (before 1856)
- Spouse: Grace Josephine Clark (m. 1868; died 1884)
- Children: 2, including Robert Clark Morris
- Parent(s): James Morris III; Rhoda Farnam
- Education: Union College

Military service
- Allegiance: United States (Union)
- Branch: United States Army (Union Army)
- Years of service: 1861–1863
- Rank: Colonel
- Commands: 14th Connecticut Infantry Regiment
- Battles/wars: American Civil War: Maryland campaign; Battle of Antietam

Timothy Dwight Morris (November 22, 1817 – September 26, 1894), widely known as Dwight Morris, was an American colonel for the Union Army during the American Civil War. He was the son of James Morris III, an officer in the American Revolutionary War, and the founder of the Morris Academy. He commanded the 14th Connecticut Infantry Regiment, and led the 2nd Brigade of the 2nd Corps during the Battle of Antietam.

In his civilian life, he was a lawyer, judge, and politician who served as the United States Consul in Le Havre, France, and as Connecticut Secretary of State.

== Biography ==
=== Earlier years ===
Timothy Dwight Morris was born on November 22, 1817, at South Farms (now Morris), Connecticut as the son of James Morris III, a veteran of the American Revolutionary War, and his second wife Rhoda Farnam. He was named after his father's friend and tutor, the Rev. Timothy Dwight, a past president at Yale University. When he was two years old his father passed away. The Morris Academy was left to be directed by his mother. In 1824, she remarried to Samuel Wheeler, and moved with her family away from South Farms.

Morris was educated at the local public schools around South Farms and studied at Union College in Schenectady, graduating in 1832. He was admitted to the bar at Litchfield in 1839, and subsequently moved to Bridgeport where he continued as a lawyer. In 1845, he was elected was as Representative from Bridgeport to the Connecticut General Assembly in Hartford. After six years, he became Judge of Probate for the district of Bridgeport. He would later be a member of the Connecticut State Legislature and served three different terms. In 1850 and in 1860, Morris would travel to Europe and Asia as he traveled to places like Jerusalem, Greece, Russia and Turkey as well as travelling to Africa in the Nile River region.

=== American Civil War ===
By the time Morris returned, the War Department would accept an additional regiment for Connecticut on May 21, 1861, and Dwight Morris was chosen to assemble the regiment at Hartford, Connecticut. On May 25, 1862, Morris was appointed as the commander of the 2nd brigade of the 3rd Division of the Army of the Potomac which he would go on to command them at the Battle of Antietam. During the battle itself, his brigade would relieve Colonel Max Weber's Brigade at Sunken Road and took positions at the northern parts of Bloody Lane and the 14th Connecticut was sent to relieve Israel B. Richardson’s Division. After Antietam, Morris would be involved in several skirmishes until he was honorably discharged on October 23, 1863, for disability.

=== Later years ===
After his discharge, Morris was appointed as a U.S. Consul of Le Havre, France in 1864, serving there from 1866 to 1869. When he returned, Morris settled down in Bridgeport, Connecticut and resumed his legal and judicial careers after a time. A Democrat, Morris was elected Secretary of State, serving from 1877 to 1879. He died in Bridgeport on September 26, 1894, from a stroke. At the time of his death he was the president of the Fairfield County Bar association, and noted as the oldest active practitioner in the state.
