= James Morris III =

Continental Army officer (1752–1820)

James Morris, III
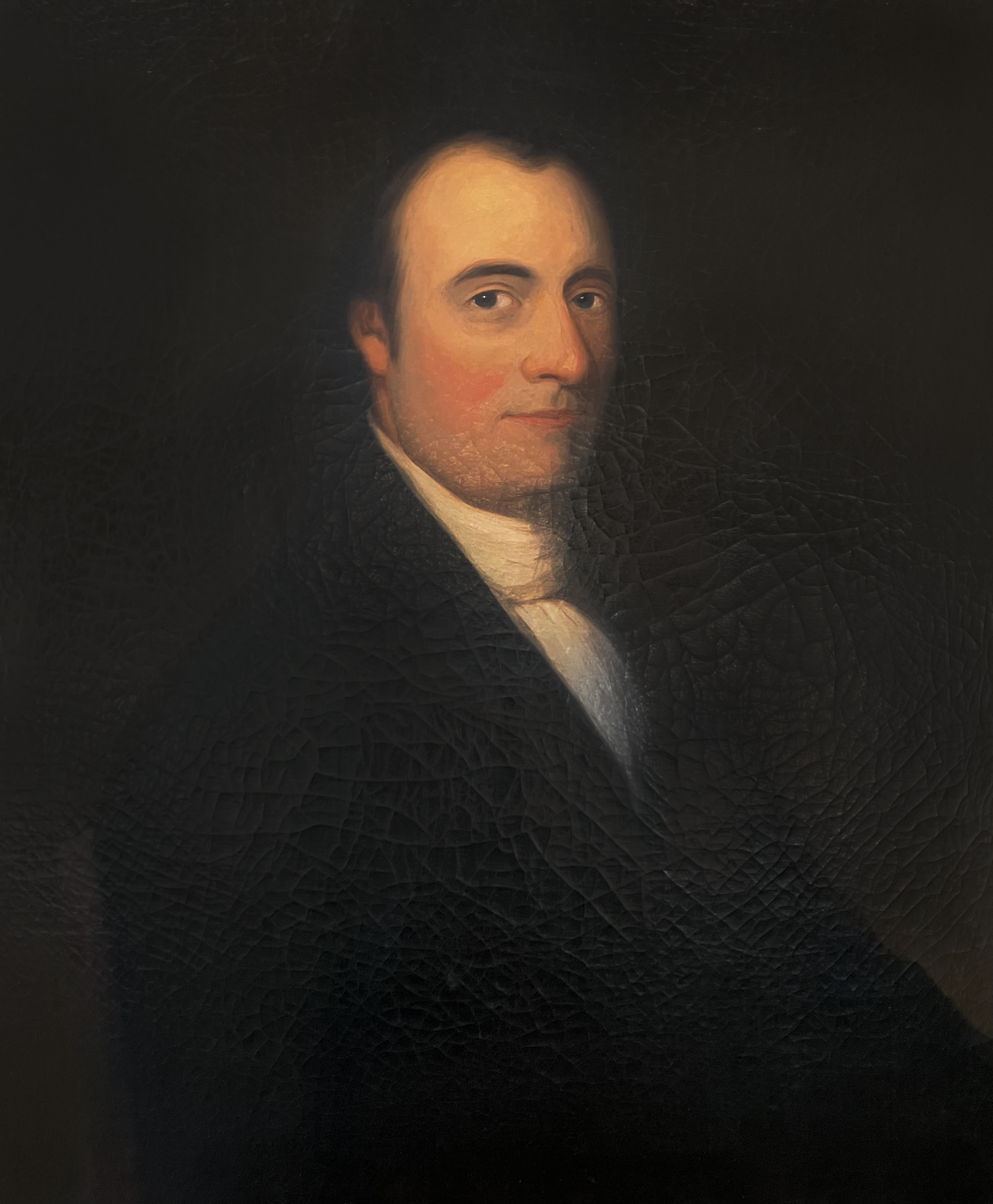
- Unattributed portrait of Morris

Member of the Connecticut House of Representatives
- In office 1798–1805

Personal details
- Born: January 19, 1752 South Farms, Connecticut
- Died: April 20, 1820 (aged 68) Goshen, Connecticut
- Resting place: East Morris Cemetery
- Party: Federalist
- Spouse: Elizabeth Hubbard (m. 1781; died 1814) Rhoda Farnam (m. 1815)
- Children: 7, including Dwight Morris
- Occupation: Military officer; politician; educator; farmer
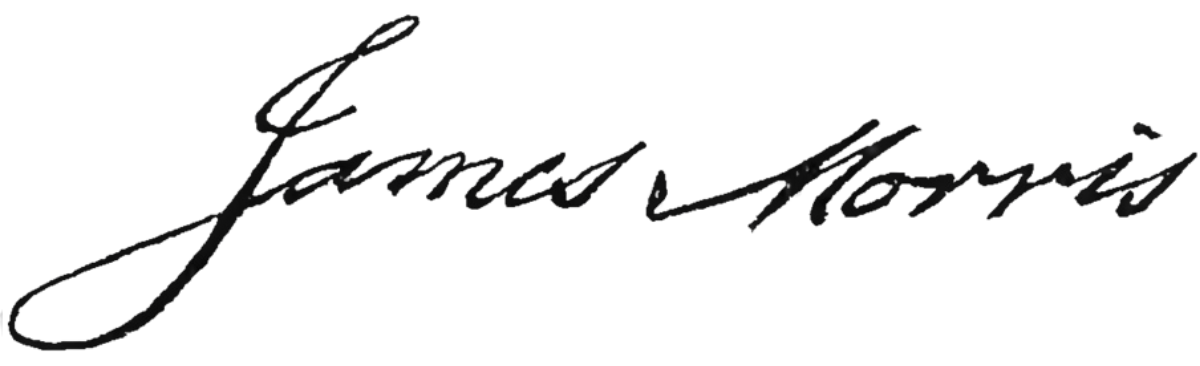
- Signature

Military service
- Allegiance: Patriot (American Revolution)
- Branch/service: Connecticut militia, Continental Army
- Rank: Major
- Battles/wars: Battle of Long Island, Battle of White Plains, Battle of Germantown, Siege of Yorktown

James Morris III (January 19, 1752 – April 20, 1820) was a Continental Army officer from Connecticut during the American Revolutionary War and founder of the Morris Academy, a pioneer in coeducation.

Born in Litchfield County, Connecticut, James Morris spent his early life hoping and training to be a minister. However, after graduating from Yale College, Morris accepted a commission of First Lieutenant from the Continental Army and joined the fight for American Independence. Morris was captured during the Battle of Germantown and spent most of the remaining war in captivity. Upon his release, Morris was promoted to the rank of Captain and supported Alexander Hamilton in the Siege of Yorktown. When he returned from the war, Morris began and ran an academy that trained both boys and girls together, a rarity at the time.

James Morris died in 1820. The South Farms section of the town of Litchfield, where he was born, was incorporated as a separate entity in 1859 and re-named Morris in his honor.

== Early life and education ==
James Morris was born on January 19, 1752, on his father's farm in Morris (then South Farms) in Litchfield County, Connecticut. Shortly after his birth, he was baptized by the pastor Dr. Joseph Bellamy in Bethlehem's old meeting house. He was the eldest child of Deacon James and Phebe Morris (née Barnes) and had a younger sister, Lucy, who was born two years after his birth. His parents were both deeply religious, which was typical of New England farmers at the time. His father, who was described as a "devout man," served as a deacon for the church.

Morris was the third James in his line, following his father and grandfather, who were also called James. Morris's paternal great-great-grandfather, Thomas Morris, was an English shipbuilder who immigrated to Quinnipiac (now New Haven), hoping to continue his trade in the New World. He arrived in Boston aboard the ship Hector in 1637, and later purchased a tract of land on what is now known as Morris Cove, due to its timber and fertile soil. He remained there until his death in 1673. The earliest evidence of the Morris family in South Farms comes from a 1734 land purchase, when John Morris, of East Haven, bought land from John Bird at the south end of Bantam Lake. James Morris, Jr., (1722–1789), Morris's father, received most of his land from his uncle, John, on his death in 1744. Soon after this grant, James, Jr., built one of the first houses on the property. His home was located to the west of an old highway that ran through land now owned by Camp Columbia. In 1751, he married Phebe Barnes, the daughter of Thomas Barnes, at the First Congregational Church in Litchfield.

As a young man, Morris displayed a keen mind and a disposition for education. He learned to read by age four and, as a devoted follower of Jonathan Edward's theology, plead with his father for a new Bible. By the age of six, after reading through his father's large Bible, he received his own.

When Morris was nine, his father built a new, much larger home just north of his birthplace, with a design that young Morris should live in half of it. As the only son, his father couldn’t bear the idea of him leaving home for a formal education, envisioning Morris as “his earthly prop on which he might lean in old age.” An idea Morris himself found unbearable.

=== Education ===
His father, being a member at the public library in Bethlehem, would often bring home religious texts which Morris would read. Through these studies, Morris hoped to eventually become a minister. In the winter of 1770, when Morris was eighteen, his father agreed to let him attend college, and sent him to Bethlehem to study full-time under Dr. Bellamy. He was put under the tutelage of Thomas Miner, a divinity student of Bellamy's, and continued with his studies until the spring of 1770. He spent the season studying under the South Farms minister Dr. Salmon Hurlburt, but made little progress, as his efforts were constantly disrupted by household chores. That fall, Morris relocated to Judea to study under Rev. Daniel Brinsmade, where he found yet another instructor in Mr. Nathan Hale (1742–1813), saying of him, "Mr. Hale was an accurate scholar and an able instructor."

In September 1771, Morris began more formal studies at Yale College. For his tutor at Yale, Morris was assigned future Yale president Timothy Dwight IV, who would be an influential force in coeducation in his own right. Morris was awarded his degree in July, 1775, noting in his memoirs, "having had my share of honorary appointments."

Upon graduation Morris returned to South Farms, where he helped his father with the harvest and took a post teaching grammar school in nearby Litchfield, where he received his first opportunity to teach and was paid "'handsome wages' hoping to reimburse his father for the heavy expenses of his college education."

== The War ==
=== Commission and early service ===
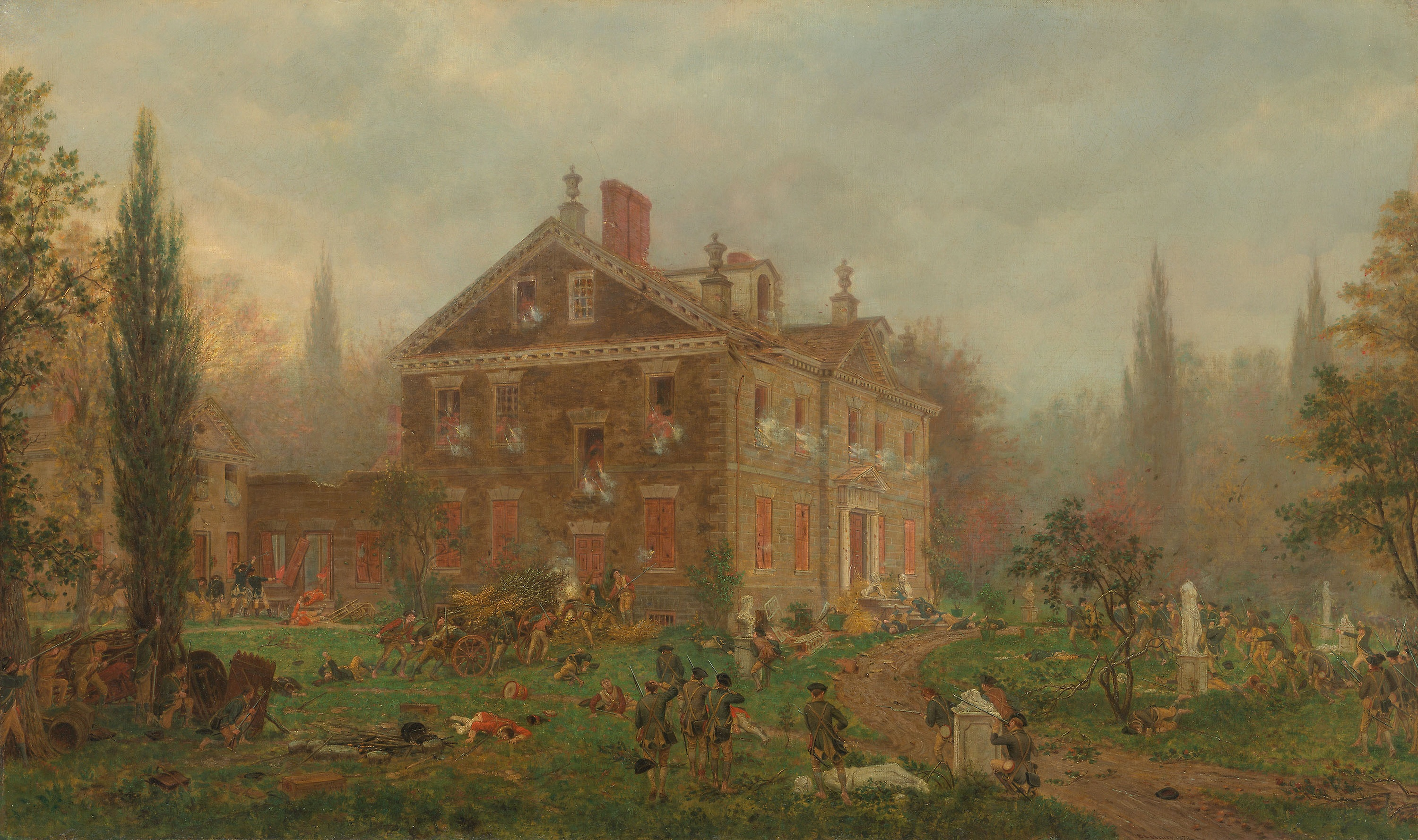
Battle of Germantown

Morris's tenure as an instructor in Litchfield was cut short when, within months of arriving, he received an unsolicited ensign's commission in the Connecticut militia, which he accepted. While in the service of the Connecticut militia Morris saw his first action, fighting battles in both Long Island and White Plains. In his memoirs, Morris wrote of this time, stating that "The soldiers universally manifested a great respect for me, for my care of the sick and my attention to their wants, and for my sympathies in their distresses."

In late December 1776, Morris completed his commitment to the Connecticut militia and immediately accepted a commission in the Continental Army as a first lieutenant. After serving as a recruiting officer in Litchfield, Morris joined General George Washington and the army at Peekskill. On October 3, 1776, General Washington commanded this army in the Battle of Germantown. The American forces were ultimately unsuccessful in this battle and Morris was taken as a prisoner of war on October 4, 1776.

=== Captivity ===
The early part of Morris's confinement were the most trying. He was taken to the "New Jail" in Philadelphia where he "was locked in a cold room ... destitute of everything by cold stone walls and bare floors—no kind of a seat to sit on—all total darkness, no water to drink or a morsel to eat; without a blanket to cover [him]."

Despite his meager accommodations, Morris decided to make the best of his imprisonment in Philadelphia by negotiating with his jailors to borrow books from the so-called circulating library recently established by Benjamin Franklin in that city. One historian points to this time as when Morris was exposed to the philosophers that would be so influential in his later life as an educator: "From Milton, James Morris absorbed ideas in favor of healthy exercises to develop both body and mind at the same time; from Rollin, the danger of following custom blindly rather than reason; and from Locke, the novel idea that the English language was as important as Latin and Greek."

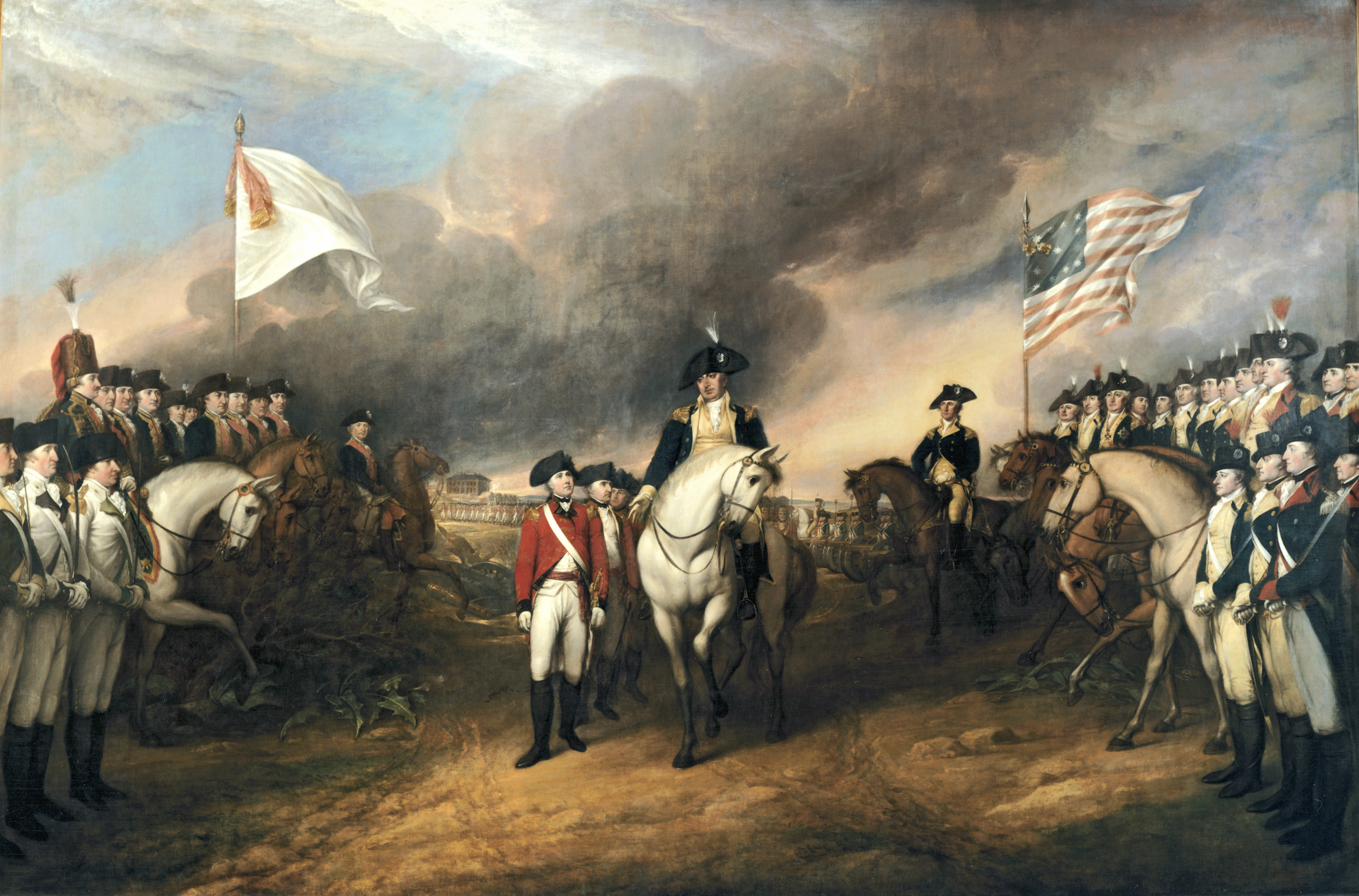
Surrender of Cornwallis at Yorktown by John Trumbull, 1797

In May 1778, Morris convinced his captors to admit him to parole and was sent to Flatbush, Long Island, where he stayed with a Mr. Clarkson. In his memoir, Morris noted that Clarkson was "a man of science and large property, ... who owned the most extensive private library that [Morris] had ever known in the United States." While still in captivity Morris found this situation rather comfortable and took every advantage of the library he so admired.

On January 3, 1781, Morris was freed as part of a prisoner exchange.

=== Post-release ===
Upon his release, Morris returned to Peekskill where he discovered that he had been promoted to the rank of captain while in the custody of the British. Morris commanded a company back to White Plains until he received orders to head south to Virginia. Upon arrival, Morris's company, under the overall command of General George Washington, aided in Siege of Yorktown, the last major battle of the American Revolution. Specifically, Morris's company of light infantry provided support to the forlorn hope commanded by Colonel Alexander Hamilton.

== Post-war ==
James Morris returned to South Farms in December 1781. Days after his return, on December 20, he married Elizabeth Hubbard. Shortly thereafter, the people of South Farms made Morris both the Justice of the Peace and a Selectman. In the summer of 1782 Morris briefly returned to service, but was ultimately released from service in November of that year.

In the following years James and Elizabeth had five children:

- Abigail Morris (b. 8/2/1783)
- James E. Morris (b. 12/4/1784): 1803 Yale graduate, Teacher at Sunbury Academy and Tutor at Franklin College, now University of Georgia, attorney in Waynesboro, Georgia
- Reuben Smith Morris (b. 5/24/1786): 1804 Yale graduate, attorney in Cayuga, New York.
- Samuel Hubbard Morris (b. 2/6/1788) (d. 12/22/1793)
- Robert Hubbard Morris (b. 7/25/1789): "endowed with 'good academic education,'" settled at Cayuga."

In between the birth of James and Reuben, Morris became severely ill. During his illness, a man named Gad Farnam moved into the Morris's home to care for him day and night. The two families became very close and Gad's daughter Rhoda, only five years old at the time of the illness, later became Morris's second wife. It was at this point in Morris's life that he accepted that he would never realize his early dream of becoming a minister.

== The Morris Academy ==
By 1790, it had become common for children to come to Morris's house for instruction and access to his library. Morris welcomed all of these students, both male and female. Morris's coeducation caused some stir within the community when some claimed that his education of women was "'blowing up their pride' so that 'they would feel themselves above their mates and they would feel above labour.'" In 1794, these frustrations were brought to fruition when a hearing was held in the church. The charges were dismissed and the publicity from the controversy brought so much attention, that, by 1803, he had instructed students "from all the New England States except Rhode Island, and from the States of New York, New Jersey, Pennsylvania, Maryland, Virginia, South Carolina and Georgia. Also from the Island of St. Thomas in the West Indies, and from the Island of Bermuda."

By the turn of the century, Morris found it necessary to formalize his instruction and construct a proper Academy building. The estimated cost was $1200, so Morris enlisted wealthy residents of Litchfield and South Farms.

On November 28, 1803, The Morris Academy moved out of James Morris's home and into the brand new building. For the period from 1803 to 1812, the Morris Academy grew to an average of 50-75 students.

The abolitionist John Brown, born in 1800, studied at the Morris Academy, although the exact dates are not known.

The Academy was handed to several other heads of school, until, on April 12, 1888, the Morris Academy was closed for good.

In the introduction to her book on the academy, Barbara Nolen Strong noted:

The Morris Academy is entitled to be called a pioneer institution because of its 'open door' policy in coeducation. It was not the first in the United States, not even in Connecticut, but none of the other early academies opened their doors as wide and kept them open as long. No other coeducational academy spread its influence so far.

== Later life ==
In September 1814 Morris's wife Elizabeth died. The following March, Morris married Rhonda Farnam and the marriage bore two children.

- Jane Elizabeth Morris (b. 1/30/1816)
- Timothy Dwight Morris (b. 11/22/1817)

During the "second war with Great Britain", at the age of 61, Morris was commissioned as a First Major of the Second Regiment of Volunteers in the State of Connecticut.

Toward the end of his life, Morris compiled his memoirs, which were subsequently published as Memoirs of James Morris of South Farms In Litchfield.

=== Death ===
Morris left his home on April 17, 1820, to attend the foreign missionary school at Cornwall. Around 10 p.m. that same day, he began to feel ill. Hoping to return home before he died, he left Cornwall two days later on April 19. After riding six miles he became weak and realized that he could not go any further. He stopped at the home of his friend, Deacon Augustus Thompson in Goshen. There, he died at about 8 a.m. on April 20, 1820, at the age of sixty-eight years and three months. His interment was held on Friday, April 21, in the East Morris Cemetery, and Rev. Joseph Harvey, of Goshen, delivered a sermon from Hebrews 6:12.

== Legacy ==
In June, 1859, South Farms was incorporated as Morris, Connecticut, in his honor.

The James Morris Museum is located in the center of the town of Morris and contains original artifacts and writings of James Morris.

The foundation of The Morris Academy remains intact on the grounds of James Morris Elementary School, in Morris.
