= Washington Turnpike =

Washington Turnpike may refer to:

- Washington Turnpike (Connecticut)
- Washington Turnpike (Maryland)
- Washington Turnpike (New Jersey)
- Washington Turnpike (Washington), District of Columbia, now Wisconsin Avenue
