= Thomas Morris (Puritan) =

Early settler in New England

- Born: c. 1615; Kingdom of England
- Died: July 21, 1673 (aged about 58); New Haven, Connecticut Colony
- Occupations: Shipbuilder; carpenter; farmer
- Spouse: Elizabeth
- Children: 8
- Relatives: Elizur Holyoke (cousin); James Morris III (great-great grandson); Daniel Gott (great-great-great-great grandson); Amos Bronson Alcott (great-great-great-great grandson)

Thomas Morris (c. 1615 – July 21, 1673) was an English-born shipbuilder, Puritan, and early settler of New Haven, Connecticut Colony. In 1666, he helped found Newark, New Jersey, and was one of the men who signed the Newark Covenant.

== Early life ==
Thomas Morris was born to John Morris and his wife Anne Holyoke in England. His parents were married in 1606, at Alcester, Warwickshire. Morris's mother was the sister of Edward Holyoke, who was the father of Elizur Holyoke, the namesake of Holyoke, Massachusetts.

== Life in New Haven ==
It is believed that Morris sailed to Boston aboard the Hector, arriving on June 26, 1637. The ship consisted of puritans and workmen who hoped to establish their trade in the New World, Morris's being ship-carpentry. The winter was spent in that city, before departing in early spring for Quinnipiac (now New Haven). The party arrived in New Haven harbor in April. He is listed by Thomas Fugill as one of the original signers of the Fundamental Agreement of the New Haven Colony on June 4, 1639. In 1643 he was admitted to the church at New Haven, and was later admitted a free inhabitant on July 3, 1648. Morris had to choose from one of the thirty-two smaller lots distributed to the settlers, holding no right of commonage. He chose a tract of land along the riverbank on the area now known as Morris Cove. When the first New Haven meetinghouse needed repairs, Thomas Morris was one of the committee members responsible for deciding how the work should be done. This suggests Morris must have been a skilled workman who supervised journeymen and apprentices. Although he primarily worked as a shipbuilder, he clearly had broader construction skills.

In the spring of 1644, Morris and four other men set out from New Haven to meet with a Wethersfield group of settlers in Totokett (now Branford). Although Morris is listed as one of the founders of that town, he did not own any land there, and seems to have returned to New Haven shortly after.

Led by Capt. Robert Treat, Morris was among the first group of settlers who arrived in Newark, New Jersey, in May, 1666, and was a signer of Newark Covenant. On May 21, 1666, he was chosen as one of the eleven men on Newark's first town committee, giving him authority over who could own land and where.

Morris did not spend much time in Newark, returning to New Haven sometime in or after 1667. On March 16, 1671, Morris purchased a small peninsula bordered by Thomas Gregson’s farm to the north and the meadows along Fowler’s Creek to the east. His plan was to use the land for shipbuilding, finding the timber there was excellent, and the soil fertile for farming. However, Morris’s plans were cut short due to his death on July 21, 1673. The first person to live on the farm at Morris Cove was Amos Morris, his great-grandson. The date "1671" is still carved on the house standing on that land. The inventory of Morris's estate was taken on November 23, 1673, and included valuable carpenters' and joiners' tools, which were divided among his three sons: John, Eleazer, and Joseph.

== Marriage and family ==
Morris married a woman named Elizabeth (d. 1681). Assuming he was single when he arrived in the New Haven Colony, the date of their marriage would fall between April 1638 and June 1640 (nine months before the birth of his first child). They had the following children:

1. Hannah Morris, b. March 14, 1641/2.
2. Elizabeth Morris, bapt. December 20, 1643.
3. John Morris, bapt. March 12, 1645. Died young.
4. John Morris, bapt. March 8, 1646. He died December 10, 1711, in New Haven.
5. Eleazer Morris, bapt. October 29, 1648.
6. Thomas Morris, b. October 3, 1651. Died young.
7. Ephraim Morris, b. October 3, 1651. Died young.
8. Joseph Morris, b. March 25, 1656.

All eight children were born in the New Haven Colony.
