= Connecticut Route 109 =

State highway in Litchfield County, Connecticut, US

Route 109
- Map of Litchfield County in northwestern Connecticut with Route 109 highlighted in red

Route information
- Maintained by CTDOT
- Length: 20.93 mi (33.68 km)
- Existed: 1932–present

Major junctions
- West end: US 202 in New Milford
- East end: US 6 in Thomaston

Location
- Country: United States
- State: Connecticut
- Counties: Litchfield

Highway system
- Connecticut State Highway System; Interstate; US; State; SSR; SR; Scenic
← Route 108	→ Route 110

Route 109 is a state highway in western Connecticut, running from New Milford to Thomaston.

== Route description ==
Route 109 begins at an intersection with US 202 in New Milford and heads northeast into Washington, where if overlaps Route 47 for 0.28 miles (0.45 km) before continuing into Morris. In Morris, Route 109 heads east, then northeast and southeast, before cutting across a corner of Litchfield by the Wigwam Reservoir into Thomaston. In Thomaston, Route 109 continues southeast and then east along the Wigwam Reservoir and Branch River to end at an intersection with US 6 and Route 254.

== History ==
In 1922, the Bantam to Morris route was designated as State Highway 310. This became part of Route 109 when it was commissioned in 1932, running from the Bantam section of Litchfield past Bantam Lake to its current eastern terminus in Thomaston. In 1963, the section past Bantam Lake was reassigned to Route 209 and Route 109 was rerouted to its current western terminus using former SR 857. In 1968, the section near the Branch River in Thomaston was rerouted uphill to accommodate a flood control project.

== Junction list ==
The entire route is in Litchfield County.

Location	mi	km	Destinations	Notes
New Milford	0.00	0.00	US 202 – Brookfield, Litchfield	Western terminus
Washington	6.10	9.82	Route 47 south – Woodbury	Western end of Route 47 concurrency
Washington	6.38	10.27	Route 47 north – New Preston	Eastern end of Route 47 concurrency
Morris	12.45	20.04	Route 209 north – Bantam	Southern terminus of Route 209
Morris	14.06	22.63	Route 61 – Litchfield, Bethlehem	
Morris	15.20	24.46	Route 63 – Litchfield, Watertown	
Thomaston	20.93	33.68	US 6 / Watertown Road (SR 810 east) to Route 8 / Route 254 north – Plymouth, Watertown, Northfield, Torrington	Eastern terminus
1.000 mi = 1.609 km; 1.000 km = 0.621 mi: Concurrency terminus
