= Mount Tom State Park =

State park in Litchfield County, Connecticut

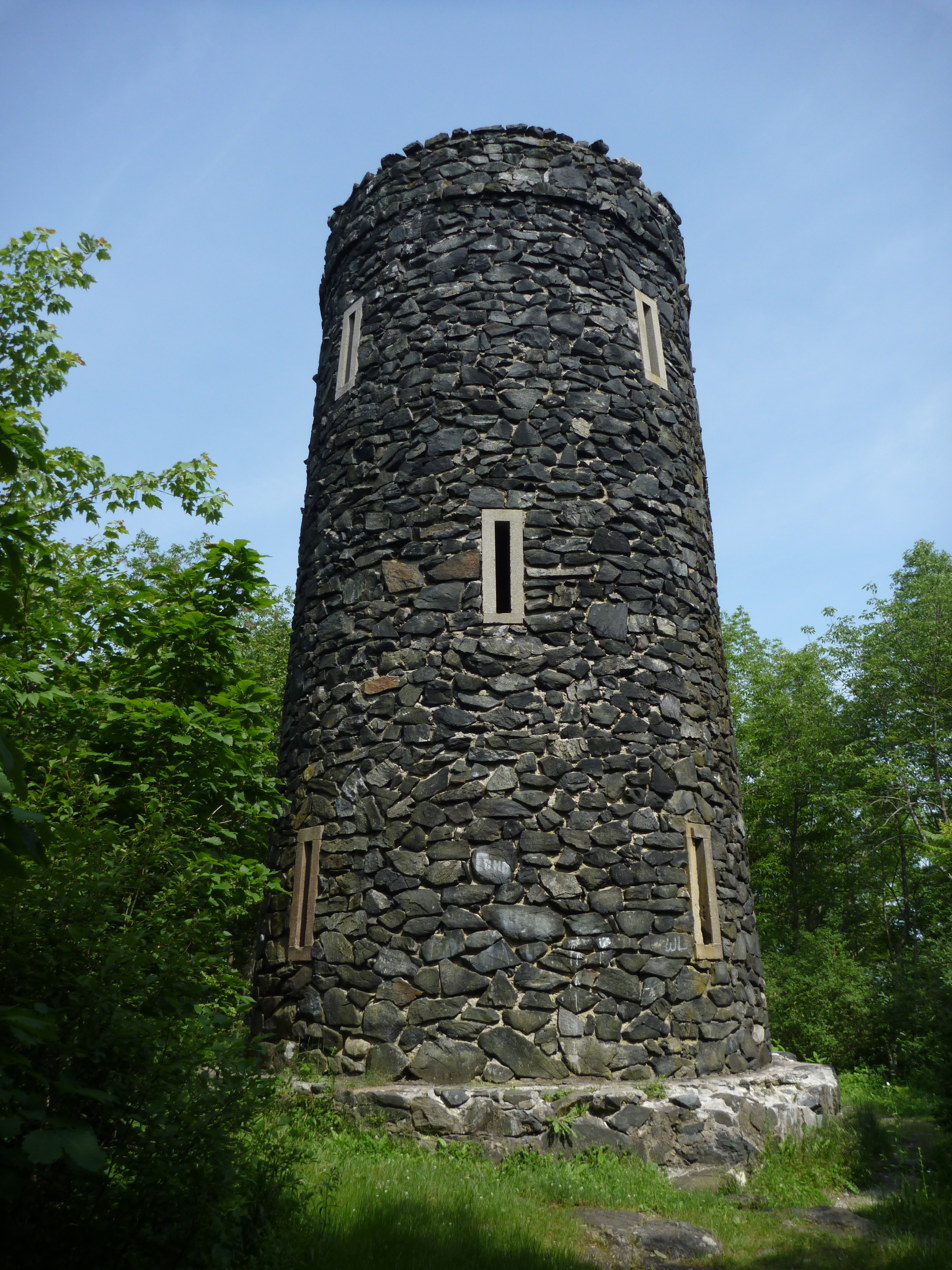
- Mount Tom Tower

- Location within Connecticut Location within the United States
- Location: Litchfield, Morris and Washington, Connecticut, United States
- Coordinates: 41°41′36″N 73°16′24″W
- Area: 231 acres (93 ha)
- Elevation: 1,289 ft (393 m)
- Established: 1915
- Administrator: Connecticut Department of Energy and Environmental Protection
- Designation: Connecticut state park
- Website: Official website
- Mount Tom Tower
- U.S. National Register of Historic Places
- Location: Mount Tom State Park, Litchfield County, Connecticut
- Area: 20 acres (8.1 ha)
- Built: 1921
- Built by: John DaRoss from Litchfield, CT
- Architect: Alfred M. Turner
- Architectural style: Late 19th and 20th Century Revivals/Jacobean Revival
- NRHP reference No.: 93001247
- Added to NRHP: December 12, 1993

Mount Tom State Park is a public recreation area lying south of Route 202 in the towns of Washington, Litchfield, and Morris, Connecticut. The state park occupies 231 acres (93 ha) on the southwest shore of Mount Tom Pond and is home to the Mount Tom Tower, which was listed on the National Register of Historic Places in 1993. It is managed by the Connecticut Department of Energy and Environmental Protection.

== History ==
The park is one of the oldest in the Connecticut state park system, having been among the 15 created between 1913 and 1918 by Connecticut's first State Park Commission. The park's land had been donated in 1911 for use as a state park by Charles H. Senff. Following Senff's death, his widow, Gustavia A. Senff, saw the transfer of the property through to completion, with the state legislature finalizing the action in 1917. It was the first to open.

== Mount Tom Tower ==
A condition of the Senff gift was that a permanent observation tower be maintained at the summit of Mount Tom. The State Park Commission recommended that a stone tower be built to replace a wooden structure that had stood at the spot since 1888. The commission's secretary, Alfred M. Turner, drew up plans which were not closely followed. John DaRoss (John DaRoss & Sons) of Litchfield constructed the tower of rough black gneiss found at the site. The tower stands 34 feet (10 m) high and 15 feet (4.6 m) in diameter; it was completed in 1921. Visitors can climb to the top for views that extend to Mount Everett in Massachusetts, the Catskills in New York, and Long Island Sound.

== Geology ==
The park is notable for the presence of the metamorphic rocks gneiss and schist, the minerals quartz, garnet and hornblende, and boulders carried to the site by Ice Age glaciers.

== Activities and amenities ==
The park offers fishing, swimming, and canoeing on 56-acre (23 ha) Mount Tom Pond, hiking the nearly one-mile-long loop trail that ascends Mount Tom to the observation tower, and picnicking.

== See also ==
- National Register of Historic Places listings in Litchfield County, Connecticut
