= Bantam Lake =

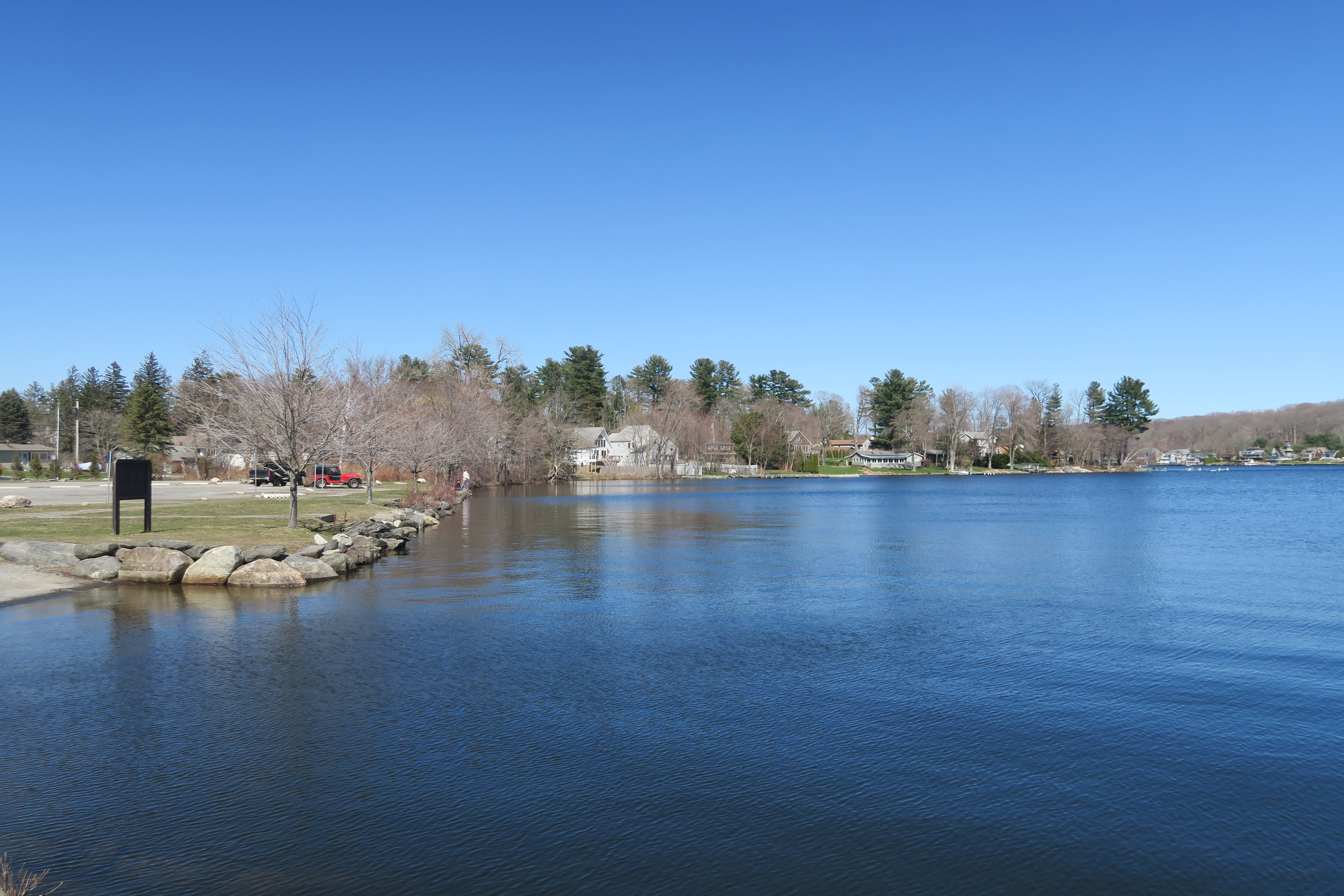
- Bantam Lake

- Location in Connecticut
- Location: Border of Morris, Connecticut and Litchfield, Connecticut
- Coordinates: 41°42′16″N 73°13′17″W
- Type: Lake
- Primary inflows: Bantam River
- Primary outflows: Bantam River
- Max. length: 2.32 miles (3.73 km)
- Max. width: 1.47 miles (2.37 km)
- Surface area: 947 acres (383 ha)
- Average depth: 14.3 feet (4.4 m)
- Max. depth: 25 feet (7.6 m)
- Residence time: 108 days
- Surface elevation: 892 feet (272 m)
- Islands: Deer Island

Interactive map of Bantam Lake

Bantam Lake is the largest natural lake in Connecticut, covering 947 acres (383 ha) in the towns of Morris and Litchfield. Much of the land at the northern end of the lake, including the peninsula of Marsh Point, is protected by the White Memorial Foundation and home to a wide array of bird species. It is lined by campgrounds, camps for kids and has facilities for various water sports. The lake also has two public beaches, Morris Town Beach and Sandy Beach.

It is home to the Bantam Lake Ski Club, the oldest, continuously operating water ski club in the United States, as well as the Litchfield Hills Rowing Club which offers Summer and Fall (high school) and Masters programs.
