= Bethlehem Village, Connecticut =

- Census-designated place
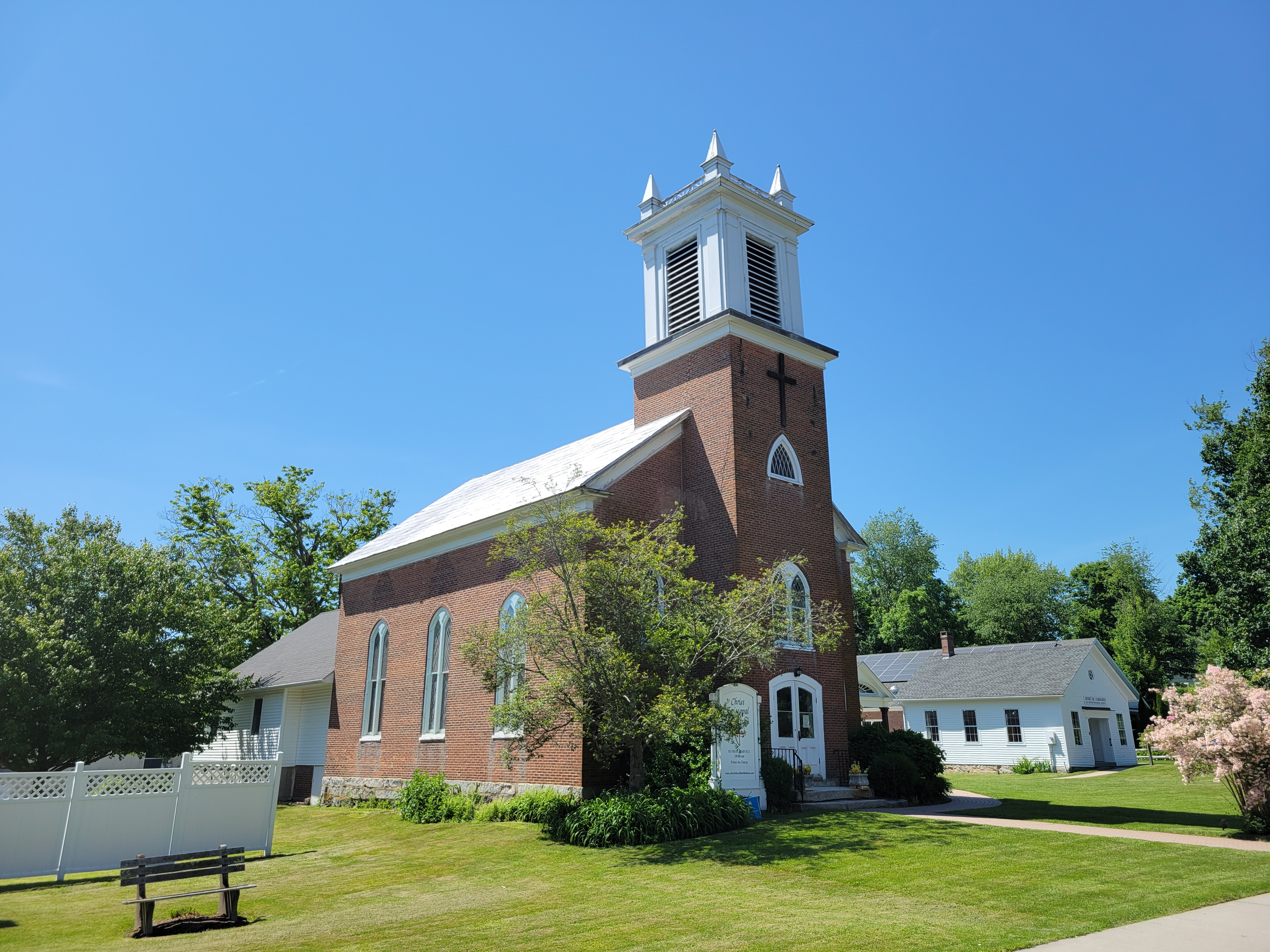
- Christ Episcopal Church

- Location in Litchfield County, Connecticut
- Coordinates: 41°38′22″N 73°12′29″W
- Country: United States
- State: Connecticut
- Town: Bethlehem

Area
  - Total: 8.06 sq mi (20.87 km^{2})
  - Land: 7.79 sq mi (20.18 km^{2})
  - Water: 0.27 sq mi (0.69 km^{2})
- Elevation: 861 ft (262 m)

Population (2010)
  - Total: 2,021
  - Density: 260/sq mi (100.2/km^{2})
- Time zone: UTC-5 (EST)
  - Summer (DST): UTC-4 (EDT)
- ZIP Code: 06751
- Area code: 860
- FIPS code: 09-04945
- GNIS feature ID: 2378336

Bethlehem Village is a census-designated place (CDP) within the town of Bethlehem in Litchfield County, Connecticut, United States. The CDP includes the Bethlehem Green Historic District at the town center, as well as surrounding residential and rural land. As of the 2020 census, Bethlehem Village had a population of 1,970.

== Geography ==
The Bethlehem Village CDP occupies about 40% of the town of Bethlehem, covering the center part of the town from its border with Morris in the north to Crane Hollow Road, Robert Leather Road, and Porter Hill Road in the south. The CDP extends east to Hard Hill Road N, East Spring Brook, and Nonnewaug Road, and west to Weekeepeemee Road, Judge Lane, Woodcreek Road, and Munger Lane.

According to the United States Census Bureau, the CDP has a total area of 8.1 square miles (20.9 km^{2}), of which 7.8 square miles (20.2 km^{2}) are land and 0.3 square miles (0.7 km^{2}), or 3.30%, are water. Long Meadow Pond and the Bronson E. Lockwood Reservoir are in the northern part of the CDP.

Connecticut Route 61 passes through the center of the village, leading north 8 miles (13 km) to Litchfield and south 4 miles (6 km) to U.S. Route 6 in Woodbury. Connecticut Route 132 crosses Route 61 at the village center, leading east four miles to Connecticut Route 63 in Watertown and southwest 7 miles (11 km) to Connecticut Route 47 in Woodbury.

== Demographics ==
=== 2020 census ===
As of the 2020 census, Bethlehem Village had a population of 1,970. The median age was 51.7 years. 16.8% of residents were under the age of 18 and 23.4% of residents were 65 years of age or older. For every 100 females there were 97.4 males, and for every 100 females age 18 and over there were 97.6 males age 18 and over.

0.0% of residents lived in urban areas, while 100.0% lived in rural areas.

There were 854 households in Bethlehem Village, of which 17.4% had children under the age of 18 living in them. Of all households, 51.8% were married-couple households, 17.9% were households with a male householder and no spouse or partner present, and 23.4% were households with a female householder and no spouse or partner present. About 28.7% of all households were made up of individuals and 15.2% had someone living alone who was 65 years of age or older.

There were 1,000 housing units, of which 14.6% were vacant. The homeowner vacancy rate was 3.1% and the rental vacancy rate was 1.8%.

Racial composition as of the 2020 census
Race	Number	Percent
White	1,829	92.8%
Black or African American	21	1.1%
American Indian and Alaska Native	1	0.1%
Asian	8	0.4%
Native Hawaiian and Other Pacific Islander	0	0.0%
Some other race	12	0.6%
Two or more races	99	5.0%
Hispanic or Latino (of any race)	67	3.4%

=== 2010 census ===
At the 2010 census, there were 2,021 people, 840 households and 573 families residing in the CDP. The population density was 260 inhabitants per square mile (100/km^{2}). There were 969 housing units, of which 129, or 13.3%, were vacant. 95 of the vacant units were for seasonal or recreational use. The racial makeup of the CDP was 97.9% White, 0.4% African American, 0.2% Native American, 0.3% Asian, 0.2% some other race and 0.9% from two or more races. Hispanic or Latino of any race were 1.5% of the population.

Of the 840 households in the CDP, 26.4% had children under the age of 18 living with them, 57.0% were headed by married couples living together, 7.9% had a female householder with no husband present, and 31.8% were non-families. 26.4% of all households were made up of individuals, and 12.3% were someone living alone who was 65 years of age or older. The average household size was 2.37, and the average family size was 2.88.

19.3% of the population were under the age of 18, 2.9% were from 18 to 24, 19.4% were from 25 to 44, 38.4% were from 45 to 64, and 15.0% were 65 years of age or older. The median age was 47.0 years. For every 100 females, there were 99.9 males. For every 100 females age 18 and over, there were 98.4 males.

=== Income and poverty ===
For the period 2013–17, the estimated median household income was $90,125 and the median family income was $110,781. Male full-time workers had a median income of $54,063 compared with $66,000 for females. The per capita income for the CDP was $47,614. 1.4% of families and 6.0% of the total population were living below the poverty line, including 5.6% of people under eighteen and 9.2% of those over 64.

== Education ==
It is in the Regional School District 14.
