= 1936 United States presidential election in Connecticut =

- November 3, 1936
- Turnout: 89.65% ▲

Nominee	Franklin D. Roosevelt	Alf Landon
Party	Democratic	Republican
Home state	New York	Kansas
Running mate	John Nance Garner	Frank Knox
Electoral vote	8	0
Popular vote	382,129	278,685
Percentage	55.32%	40.35%

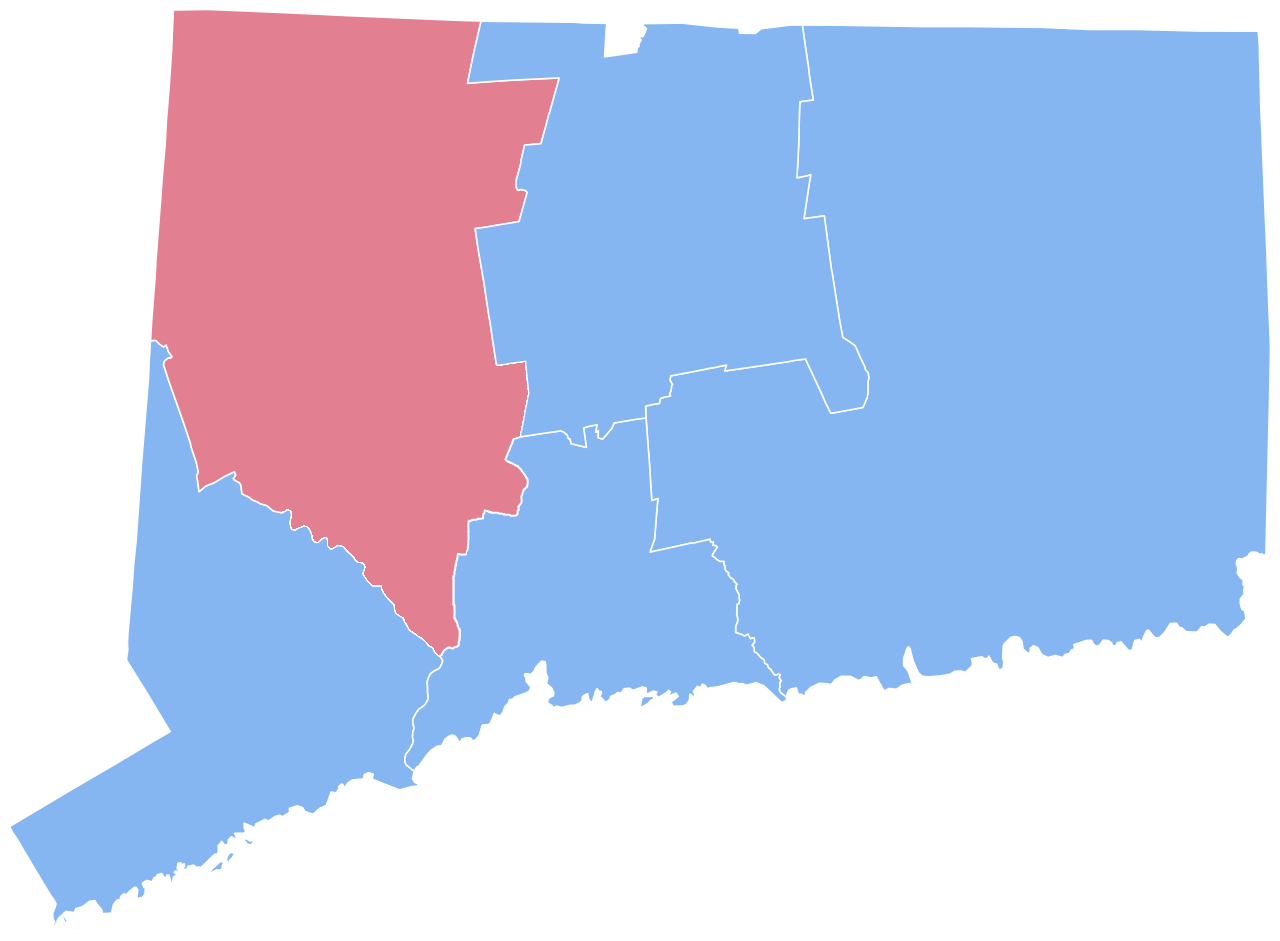
Roosevelt
50–60%
60–70%
70–80%
Landon
50–60%
60–70%
70–80%
President before election
Franklin D. Roosevelt
Democratic
Elected President
Franklin D. Roosevelt
Democratic

The 1936 United States presidential election in Connecticut was held on November 3, 1936, as part of the 1936 United States presidential election. The state voters chose eight electors to the Electoral College, who voted for president and vice president. Connecticut voted for Democratic Party candidate and incumbent President Franklin D. Roosevelt, who won the state by a margin of 14.97%.

As of 2024, this remains the last election in which Connecticut voted to the right of Nebraska. Roosevelt was the first Democrat to carry the state since 1912, the first to carry it with a majority of the popular vote since Grover Cleveland in 1892, and the first to carry Tolland County since 1852. This was the first presidential election in Connecticut's history where the Democrat won by more than 5%.

== Results ==
1936 United States presidential election in Connecticut
Party	Candidate	Running mate	Popular vote		Electoral vote	
Party	Candidate	Running mate	Count	%	Count	%
Democratic	Franklin Delano Roosevelt of New York	John Nance Garner of Texas	382,129	55.32%	8	100.00%
Republican	Alf Landon of Kansas	Frank Knox of Illinois	278,685	40.35%	0	0.00%
Union	William Lemke of North Dakota	Thomas C. O'Brien of Massachusetts	21,805	3.16%	0	0.00%
Socialist	Norman Thomas of New York	George A. Nelson of Wisconsin	5,683	0.82%	0	0.00%
Socialist Labor	John W. Aiken of Connecticut	Emil F. Teichert of New York	1,228	0.18%	0	0.00%
Communist	Earl Russell Browder of Kansas	James W. Ford of New York	1,193	0.17%	0	0.00%
Total			690,723	100.00%	8	100.00%

=== By county ===
1936 United States presidential election in Connecticut (by county)
County	Roosevelt %	Roosevelt #	Landon %	Landon #	Others %	Others #	Margin %	Margin #	Total #
Fairfield	54.7%	87,329	42.5%	67,846	2.8%	4,446	12.2%	19,483	159,621
Hartford	59.1%	103,450	37.5%	65,652	3.3%	5,812	21.6%	37,798	174,914
Litchfield	47.2%	17,468	50.9%	18,850	1.9%	688	-3.7%	-1,382	37,006
Middlesex	52.4%	12,294	46.6%	10,925	1.0%	236	5.8%	1,369	23,455
New Haven	57.9%	117,308	37.8%	76,614	4.2%	8,524	20.1%	40,694	202,446
New London	52.8%	24,999	45.1%	21,367	2.1%	992	7.7%	3,632	47,358
Tolland	51.2%	6,676	45.8%	5,965	3.0%	390	5.4%	711	13,031
Windham	50.9%	12,605	46.3%	11,466	2.9%	717	4.6%	1,139	24,788

==== Counties that flipped from Republican to Democratic ====
- Fairfield
- New London
- Hartford
- Middlesex
- Tolland

== See also ==
- United States presidential elections in Connecticut
