= Bethlehem Historic District =

Bethlehem Historic District may refer to:

in West Bank, Palestine

- Bethlehem, the historic city, and district capital of the Bethlehem Governorate of Palestine
- Bethlehem Governorate, one of 16 governorates (districts) of Palestine

in the United States

(by state)

- Bethlehem Green Historic District, Bethlehem, Connecticut
- Bethlehem Historic District (Augusta, Georgia)
- Bethlehem Academy Historic District, St. John, Kentucky
- Bethlehem Loading Company Mays Landing Plant Archeological Historic District, Estell Manor, New Jersey
- Central Bethlehem Historic District, Bethlehem, Pennsylvania
- South Bethlehem Downtown Historic District, Bethlehem, Pennsylvania
- Bethlehem Middle Works Historic District, Christiansted, Virgin Islands
