= 1912 United States presidential election in Connecticut =

- November 5, 1912

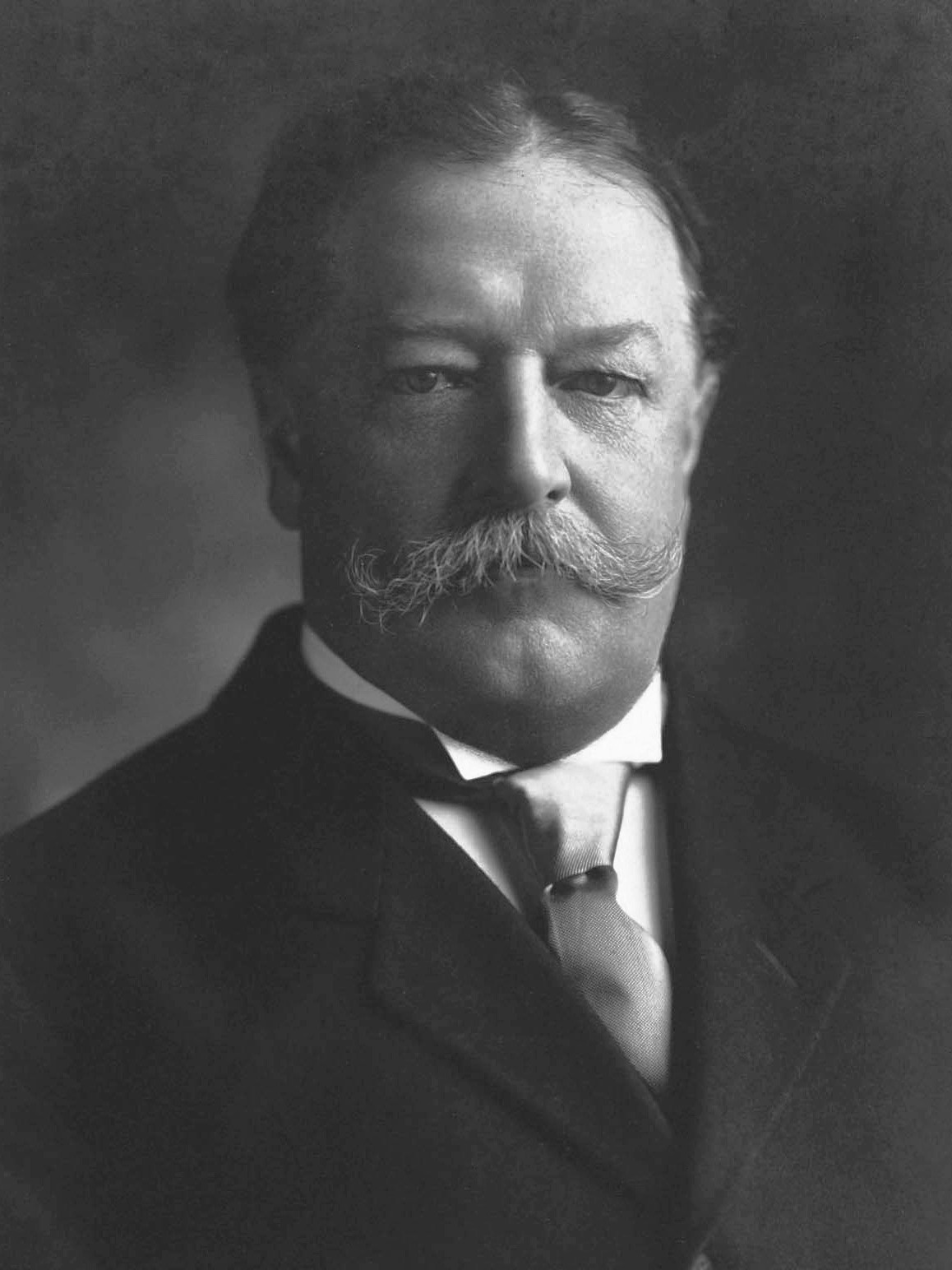

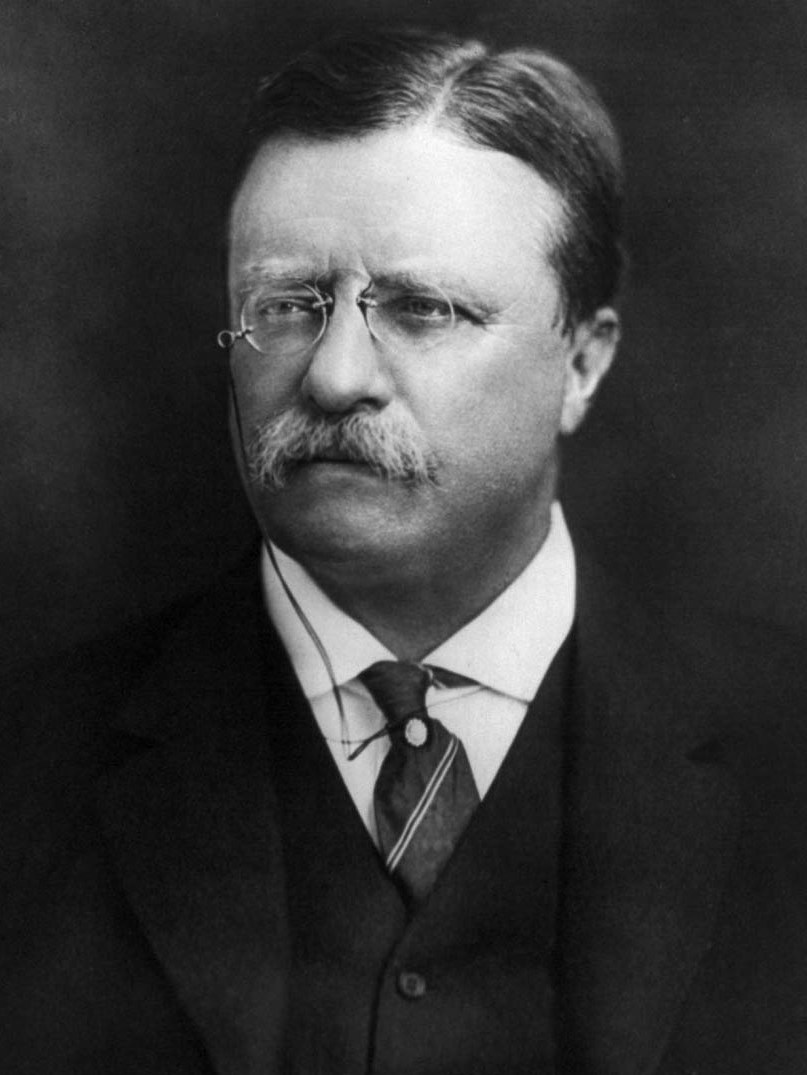

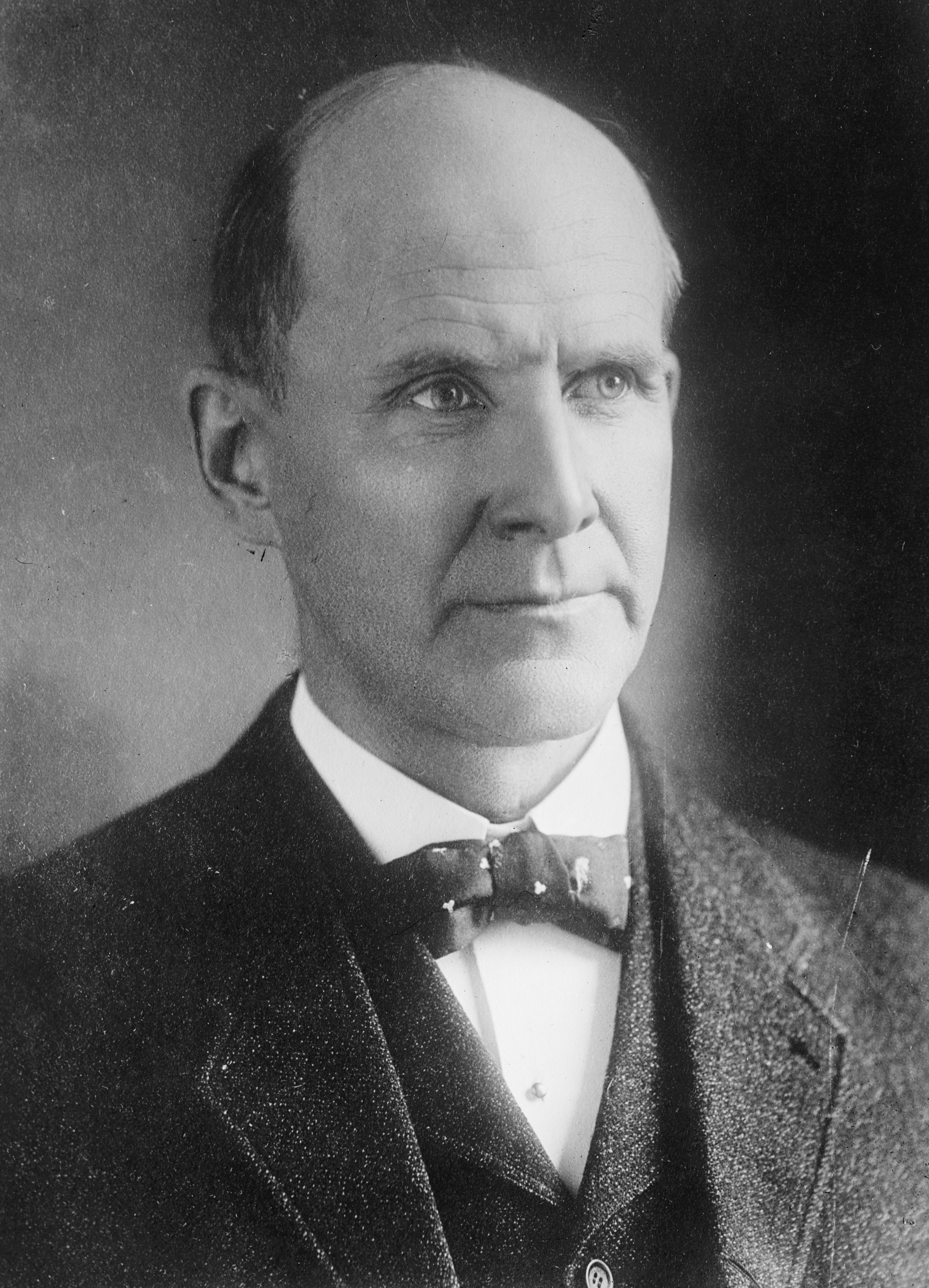
Nominee	Woodrow Wilson	William Howard Taft
Party	Democratic	Republican
Home state	New Jersey	Ohio
Running mate	Thomas R. Marshall	Nicholas M. Butler
Electoral vote	7	0
Popular vote	74,561	68,324
Percentage	39.16%	35.88%
Nominee	Theodore Roosevelt	Eugene V. Debs
Party	Progressive	Socialist
Home state	New York	Indiana
Running mate	Hiram Johnson	Emil Seidel
Electoral vote	0	0
Popular vote	34,129	10,056
Percentage	17.92%	5.28%

Wilson
30–40%
40–50%
Taft
30–40%
40–50%
Roosevelt
30–40%
President before election
William Howard Taft
Republican
Elected President
Woodrow Wilson
Democratic

The 1912 United States presidential election in Connecticut took place on November 5, 1912, as part of the 1912 United States presidential election which was held throughout all contemporary 48 states. Voters chose seven representatives, or electors to the Electoral College, who voted for president and vice president.

During the Third Party System, Connecticut was one of a small number of critical swing states due to its opposing Democratic Catholic and Republican Yankee populations being closely matched at the polls. However, the fear William Jennings Bryan generated amongst the northeastern industrial elite, and among Catholic voters who belonged to a church that condemned free silver, meant that after the “Panic of 1893” Connecticut became substantially a one-party Republican state, although not to the same degree as many states in upper New England, the Midwest or the Pacific. No Democrat would serve as a United States Senator from the state during the “System of 1896”, and only one Democrat would serve as Governor — the aging Simeon E. Baldwin, who had been elected in 1910.

Despite the severe divisions that had been affecting the dominant Republican Party since 1910, incumbent President William Howard Taft and Vice President James S. Sherman led the state in the earliest polls from July. However, when a better poll was taken in October, it was clear that Progressive Party candidates, former President Theodore Roosevelt and his running mate California Governor Hiram Johnson were taking too many votes to hang on even to the forty-four-thousand vote majority Taft had gained in 1908. The later poll proved accurate and Connecticut was won by the Democratic nominees, New Jersey Governor Woodrow Wilson and Indiana Governor Thomas R. Marshall won Connecticut by a narrow margin of 3.28 percent, becoming the first Democratic presidential candidate since Grover Cleveland in 1892 to win the state or any county. Fairfield County last voted Democratic in 1884.

While Taft lost the state, his 35.88 percent of the popular vote made it his fifth strongest state in terms of popular vote percentage after Utah, New Hampshire, Vermont and New Mexico. Connecticut was also the only northeastern state where Socialist Eugene V. Debs received over 5 percent of the vote. This was the first occasion since 1852 that a Democrat won New London County. To date, this was the most recent presidential election in which the Democratic nominee carried the town of Monroe.

== Results ==
1912 United States presidential election in Connecticut
Party	Candidate	Running mate	Popular vote		Electoral vote	
Party	Candidate	Running mate	Count	%	Count	%
Democratic	Woodrow Wilson of New Jersey	Thomas Riley Marshall of Indiana	74,561	39.16%	7	100.00%
Republican	William Howard Taft of Ohio (incumbent)	Nicholas Murray Butler of New York	68,324	35.88%	0	0.00%
Progressive	Theodore Roosevelt of New York	Hiram Warren Johnson of California	34,129	17.92%	0	0.00%
Socialist	Eugene Victor Debs of Indiana	Emil Seidel of Wisconsin	10,056	5.28%	0	0.00%
Prohibition	Eugene Wilder Chafin of Illinois	Aaron Sherman Watkins of Ohio	2,068	1.09%	0	0.00%
Socialist Labor	Arthur Elmer Reimer of Massachusetts	August Gillhaus of New York	1,260	0.65%	0	0.00%
N/A	Others	Others	6	0.01%	0	0.00%
Total			190,404	100.00%	7	100.00%

=== Results by town ===
1912 United States presidential election in Connecticut by town
Town	Woodrow Wilson Democratic		William H. Taft Republican		Theodore Roosevelt Progressive "Bull Moose"		Eugene V. Debs Socialist		Eugene W. Chafin Prohibition		Arthur E. Reimer Socialist Labor		Margin		Total votes cast (Note: Source has town labels reversed for Southington and South Windsor.)
Town	#	%	#	%	#	%	#	%	#	%	#	%	#	%	Total votes cast
Andover	37	38.14%	51	52.58%	8	8.25%	0	0.00%	1	1.03%	0	0.00%	-14	-14.43%	97
Ansonia	956	37.68%	1,022	40.28%	406	16.00%	127	5.01%	19	0.75%	7	0.28%	-66	-2.60%	2,537
Ashford	88	57.89%	41	26.97%	19	12.50%	1	0.66%	3	1.97%	0	0.00%	47	30.92%	152
Avon	92	38.02%	70	28.93%	72	29.75%	7	2.89%	1	0.41%	0	0.00%	20 (Note: In this town where Roosevelt ran ahead of Taft, margin given is Wilson vote minus Roosevelt vote and percentage margin given Wilson percentage minus Roosevelt percentage.)	8.26%	242
Barkhamsted	63	30.88%	96	47.06%	39	19.12%	4	1.96%	2	0.98%	0	0.00%	-33	-16.18%	204
Beacon Falls	35	22.15%	79	50.00%	22	13.92%	19	12.03%	2	1.27%	1	0.63%	-44	-27.85%	158
Berlin	191	30.76%	294	47.34%	100	16.10%	27	4.35%	5	0.81%	4	0.64%	-103	-16.59%	621
Bethany	50	51.55%	32	32.99%	12	12.37%	2	2.06%	1	1.03%	0	0.00%	18	18.56%	97
Bethel	250	32.38%	203	26.30%	288	37.31%	22	2.85%	7	0.91%	2	0.26%	-38	-4.92%	772
Bethlehem	33	27.05%	48	39.34%	41	33.61%	0	0.00%	0	0.00%	0	0.00%	7 (Note: In this town where Roosevelt ran ahead of Wilson, margin given is Taft vote minus Roosevelt vote and percentage margin given Taft percentage minus Roosevelt percentage.)	5.74%	122
Bloomfield	193	49.74%	154	39.69%	32	8.25%	3	0.77%	4	1.03%	2	0.52%	39	10.05%	388
Bolton	49	58.33%	25	29.76%	4	4.76%	4	4.76%	2	2.38%	0	0.00%	24	28.57%	84
Bozrah	116	63.39%	51	27.87%	13	7.10%	1	0.55%	2	1.09%	0	0.00%	65	35.52%	183
Branford	420	38.18%	392	35.64%	174	15.82%	99	9.00%	13	1.18%	2	0.18%	28	2.55%	1,100
Bridgeport	5,870	36.82%	4,625	29.01%	3,654	22.92%	1,511	9.48%	155	0.97%	129	0.81%	1,245	7.81%	15,944
Bridgewater	67	53.60%	42	33.60%	15	12.00%	0	0.00%	1	0.80%	0	0.00%	25	20.00%	125
Bristol	776	31.65%	936	38.17%	409	16.68%	275	11.22%	31	1.26%	25	1.02%	-160	-6.53%	2,452
Brookfield	87	42.44%	73	35.61%	35	17.07%	4	1.95%	5	2.44%	1	0.49%	14	6.83%	205
Brooklyn	132	46.64%	109	38.52%	40	14.13%	1	0.35%	1	0.35%	0	0.00%	23	8.13%	283
Burlington	87	46.28%	78	41.49%	18	9.57%	1	0.53%	4	2.13%	0	0.00%	9	4.79%	188
Canaan	68	41.98%	61	37.65%	25	15.43%	0	0.00%	7	4.32%	1	0.62%	7	4.32%	162
Canterbury	69	36.32%	91	47.89%	22	11.58%	4	2.11%	4	2.11%	0	0.00%	-22	-11.58%	190
Canton	324	45.76%	294	41.53%	81	11.44%	3	0.42%	5	0.71%	1	0.14%	30	4.24%	708
Chaplin	21	23.33%	51	56.67%	12	13.33%	5	5.56%	0	0.00%	1	1.11%	-30	-33.33%	90
Chatham	310	52.54%	160	27.12%	89	15.08%	22	3.73%	8	1.36%	1	0.17%	150	25.42%	590
Cheshire	141	36.15%	148	37.95%	91	23.33%	4	1.03%	6	1.54%	0	0.00%	-7	-1.79%	390
Chester	69	22.12%	108	34.62%	124	39.74%	7	2.24%	4	1.28%	0	0.00%	-16	-5.13%	312
Clinton	107	36.03%	123	41.41%	59	19.87%	3	1.01%	4	1.35%	1	0.34%	-16	-5.39%	297
Colchester	131	36.80%	186	52.25%	34	9.55%	1	0.28%	4	1.12%	0	0.00%	-55	-15.45%	356
Colebrook	39	33.62%	60	51.72%	17	14.66%	0	0.00%	0	0.00%	0	0.00%	-21	-18.10%	116
Columbia	62	45.93%	60	44.44%	13	9.63%	0	0.00%	0	0.00%	0	0.00%	2	1.48%	135
Cornwall	116	50.66%	85	37.12%	22	9.61%	0	0.00%	6	2.62%	0	0.00%	31	13.54%	229
Coventry	188	53.41%	114	32.39%	43	12.22%	3	0.85%	4	1.14%	0	0.00%	74	21.02%	352
Cromwell	107	29.08%	125	33.97%	122	33.15%	11	2.99%	3	0.82%	0	0.00%	3	0.82%	368
Danbury	1,910	41.32%	1,020	22.07%	1,381	29.88%	242	5.24%	41	0.89%	28	0.61%	529	11.45%	4,622
Darien	210	33.98%	211	34.14%	168	27.18%	28	4.53%	0	0.00%	1	0.16%	-1	-0.16%	618
Derby	726	48.69%	485	32.53%	165	11.07%	97	6.51%	8	0.54%	10	0.67%	241	16.16%	1,491
Durham	110	46.03%	104	43.51%	25	10.46%	0	0.00%	0	0.00%	0	0.00%	6	2.51%	239
East Granby	80	38.46%	99	47.60%	29	13.94%	0	0.00%	0	0.00%	0	0.00%	-19	-9.13%	208
East Haddam	135	34.09%	193	48.74%	57	14.39%	6	1.52%	5	1.26%	0	0.00%	-58	-14.65%	396
East Hartford	705	44.71%	592	37.54%	188	11.92%	72	4.57%	9	0.57%	11	0.70%	113	7.17%	1,577
East Haven	88	24.51%	183	50.97%	67	18.66%	16	4.46%	4	1.11%	1	0.28%	-95	-26.46%	359
East Lyme	185	45.34%	164	40.20%	44	10.78%	0	0.00%	14	3.43%	1	0.25%	21	5.15%	408
East Windsor	184	28.22%	356	54.60%	55	8.44%	51	7.82%	4	0.61%	2	0.31%	-172	-26.38%	652
Eastford	29	26.61%	62	56.88%	16	14.68%	0	0.00%	2	1.83%	0	0.00%	-33	-30.28%	109
Easton	82	41.62%	68	34.52%	45	22.84%	2	1.02%	0	0.00%	0	0.00%	14	7.11%	197
Ellington	156	41.94%	154	41.40%	31	8.33%	23	6.18%	4	1.08%	4	1.08%	2	0.54%	372
Enfield	561	38.35%	746	50.99%	118	8.07%	10	0.68%	27	1.85%	1	0.07%	-185	-12.65%	1,463
Essex	180	31.25%	189	32.81%	182	31.60%	22	3.82%	3	0.52%	0	0.00%	7	1.22%	576
Fairfield	303	34.04%	411	46.18%	145	16.29%	15	1.69%	13	1.46%	3	0.34%	-108	-12.13%	890
Farmington	318	45.69%	244	35.06%	102	14.66%	25	3.59%	6	0.86%	1	0.14%	74	10.63%	696
Franklin	28	26.42%	52	49.06%	25	23.58%	0	0.00%	1	0.94%	0	0.00%	-24	-22.64%	106
Glastonbury	378	45.22%	331	39.59%	115	13.76%	5	0.60%	6	0.72%	1	0.12%	47	5.62%	836
Goshen	62	38.99%	69	43.40%	26	16.35%	0	0.00%	2	1.26%	0	0.00%	-7	-4.40%	159
Granby	93	30.49%	165	54.10%	37	12.13%	0	0.00%	10	3.28%	0	0.00%	-72	-23.61%	305
Greenwich	956	37.23%	903	35.16%	613	23.87%	77	3.00%	12	0.47%	7	0.27%	53	2.06%	2,568
Griswold	251	42.04%	204	34.17%	132	22.11%	4	0.67%	3	0.50%	3	0.50%	47	7.87%	597
Groton	571	46.57%	371	30.26%	203	16.56%	44	3.59%	27	2.20%	10	0.82%	200	16.31%	1,226
Guilford	255	41.80%	198	32.46%	108	17.70%	12	1.97%	34	5.57%	3	0.49%	57	9.34%	610
Haddam	199	46.50%	172	40.19%	52	12.15%	5	1.17%	0	0.00%	0	0.00%	27	6.31%	428
Hamden	287	31.89%	310	34.44%	247	27.44%	44	4.89%	7	0.78%	5	0.56%	-23	-2.56%	900
Hampton	24	16.67%	70	48.61%	49	34.03%	0	0.00%	1	0.69%	0	0.00%	21	14.58%	144
Hartford	7,481	42.87%	6,396	36.65%	2,467	14.14%	849	4.87%	130	0.74%	128	0.73%	1,085	6.22%	17,451
Hartland	38	38.00%	49	49.00%	12	12.00%	1	1.00%	0	0.00%	0	0.00%	-11	-11.00%	100
Harwinton	57	29.23%	84	43.08%	45	23.08%	5	2.56%	3	1.54%	1	0.51%	-27	-13.85%	195
Hebron	54	33.96%	91	57.23%	12	7.55%	0	0.00%	2	1.26%	0	0.00%	-37	-23.27%	159
Huntington	340	27.98%	462	38.02%	276	22.72%	109	8.97%	22	1.81%	6	0.49%	-122	-10.04%	1,215
Kent	86	40.76%	94	44.55%	29	13.74%	0	0.00%	2	0.95%	0	0.00%	-8	-3.79%	211
Killingly	391	36.37%	459	42.70%	197	18.33%	8	0.74%	20	1.86%	0	0.00%	-68	-6.33%	1,075
Killingworth	41	38.32%	39	36.45%	20	18.69%	5	4.67%	0	0.00%	2	1.87%	2	1.87%	107
Lebanon	52	22.41%	108	46.55%	48	20.69%	0	0.00%	24	10.34%	0	0.00%	-56	-24.14%	232
Ledyard	90	47.12%	71	37.17%	26	13.61%	3	1.57%	1	0.52%	0	0.00%	19	9.95%	191
Lisbon	75	48.70%	35	22.73%	30	19.48%	10	6.49%	3	1.95%	1	0.65%	40	25.97%	154
Litchfield	359	52.95%	231	34.07%	82	12.09%	1	0.15%	4	0.59%	1	0.15%	128	18.88%	678
Lyme	72	46.15%	57	36.54%	21	13.46%	2	1.28%	4	2.56%	0	0.00%	15	9.62%	156
Madison	94	29.75%	164	51.90%	46	14.56%	4	1.27%	8	2.53%	0	0.00%	-70	-22.15%	316
Manchester	573	25.26%	823	36.29%	579	25.53%	217	9.57%	53	2.34%	23	1.01%	244	10.76%	2,268
Mansfield	98	27.15%	198	54.85%	39	10.80%	7	1.94%	18	4.99%	1	0.28%	-100	-27.70%	361
Marlborough	35	52.24%	30	44.78%	2	2.99%	0	0.00%	0	0.00%	0	0.00%	5	7.46%	67
Meriden	2,485	37.26%	2,170	32.54%	1,333	19.99%	533	7.99%	85	1.27%	63	0.94%	315	4.72%	6,669
Middlebury	37	28.24%	76	58.02%	8	6.11%	6	4.58%	4	3.05%	0	0.00%	-39	-29.77%	131
Middlefield	41	26.11%	59	37.58%	56	35.67%	0	0.00%	1	0.64%	0	0.00%	3	1.91%	157
Middletown	1,410	45.60%	1,059	34.25%	500	16.17%	92	2.98%	18	0.58%	13	0.42%	351	11.35%	3,092
Milford	453	38.52%	444	37.76%	237	20.15%	21	1.79%	11	0.94%	10	0.85%	9	0.77%	1,176
Monroe	103	47.03%	94	42.92%	21	9.59%	0	0.00%	0	0.00%	1	0.46%	9	4.11%	219
Montville	225	47.47%	200	42.19%	41	8.65%	3	0.63%	1	0.21%	4	0.84%	25	5.27%	474
Morris	63	52.94%	48	40.34%	7	5.88%	0	0.00%	1	0.84%	0	0.00%	15	12.61%	119
Naugatuck	702	37.58%	381	20.40%	274	14.67%	456	24.41%	11	0.59%	44	2.36%	246 (Note: In this town where Debs ran second ahead of Taft and Roosevelt, margin given is Wilson vote minus Debs vote and percentage margin given Wilson percentage minus Debs percentage.)	13.17%	1,868
New Britain	2,220	34.17%	2,381	36.65%	1,478	22.75%	293	4.51%	79	1.22%	45	0.69%	-161	-2.48%	6,496
New Canaan	266	34.32%	345	44.52%	152	19.61%	6	0.77%	5	0.65%	1	0.13%	-79	-10.19%	775
New Fairfield	74	58.27%	17	13.39%	31	24.41%	1	0.79%	4	3.15%	0	0.00%	43	33.86%	127
New Hartford	163	42.23%	163	42.23%	57	14.77%	0	0.00%	3	0.78%	0	0.00%	0	0.00%	386
New Haven	8,946	41.36%	7,291	33.71%	3,252	15.04%	1,696	7.84%	209	0.97%	233	1.08%	1,655	7.65%	21,627
New London	1,671	47.18%	1,050	29.64%	693	19.57%	71	2.00%	42	1.19%	15	0.42%	621	17.53%	3,542
New Milford	474	45.93%	311	30.14%	217	21.03%	8	0.78%	22	2.13%	0	0.00%	163	15.79%	1,032
Newington	90	33.96%	84	31.70%	76	28.68%	14	5.28%	1	0.38%	0	0.00%	6	2.26%	265
Newtown	360	53.10%	222	32.74%	88	12.98%	2	0.29%	6	0.88%	0	0.00%	138	20.35%	678
Norfolk	172	50.00%	112	32.56%	55	15.99%	3	0.87%	1	0.29%	1	0.29%	60	17.44%	344
North Branford	61	37.20%	91	55.49%	8	4.88%	3	1.83%	0	0.00%	1	0.61%	-30	-18.29%	164
North Canaan	164	38.05%	180	41.76%	83	19.26%	1	0.23%	3	0.70%	0	0.00%	-16	-3.71%	431
North Haven	107	27.23%	208	52.93%	59	15.01%	13	3.31%	4	1.02%	2	0.51%	-101	-25.70%	393
North Stonington	145	54.92%	96	36.36%	21	7.95%	0	0.00%	2	0.76%	0	0.00%	49	18.56%	264
Norwalk	1,654	38.33%	1,481	34.32%	1,036	24.01%	75	1.74%	50	1.16%	19	0.44%	173	4.01%	4,315
Norwich	1,910	42.88%	1,649	37.02%	704	15.81%	114	2.56%	54	1.21%	23	0.52%	261	5.86%	4,454
Old Lyme	144	54.96%	81	30.92%	33	12.60%	3	1.15%	1	0.38%	0	0.00%	63	24.05%	262
Old Saybrook	107	40.38%	129	48.68%	28	10.57%	0	0.00%	0	0.00%	1	0.38%	-22	-8.30%	265
Orange	697	32.03%	712	32.72%	586	26.93%	137	6.30%	25	1.15%	19	0.87%	-15	-0.69%	2,176
Oxford	92	44.02%	95	45.45%	21	10.05%	1	0.48%	0	0.00%	0	0.00%	-3	-1.44%	209
Plainfield	296	39.00%	363	47.83%	56	7.38%	35	4.61%	8	1.05%	1	0.13%	-67	-8.83%	759
Plainville	191	30.22%	275	43.51%	125	19.78%	34	5.38%	6	0.95%	1	0.16%	-84	-13.29%	632
Plymouth	177	24.08%	318	43.27%	81	11.02%	149	20.27%	6	0.82%	4	0.54%	-141	-19.18%	735
Pomfret	119	41.03%	116	40.00%	52	17.93%	0	0.00%	3	1.03%	0	0.00%	3	1.03%	290
Portland	346	48.46%	200	28.01%	146	20.45%	13	1.82%	7	0.98%	2	0.28%	146	20.45%	714
Preston	104	41.60%	100	40.00%	40	16.00%	2	0.80%	4	1.60%	0	0.00%	4	1.60%	250
Prospect	11	13.75%	51	63.75%	12	15.00%	3	3.75%	3	3.75%	0	0.00%	39	48.75%	80
Putnam	398	37.37%	465	43.66%	176	16.53%	16	1.50%	9	0.85%	1	0.09%	-67	-6.29%	1,065
Redding	139	42.25%	129	39.21%	55	16.72%	5	1.52%	1	0.30%	0	0.00%	10	3.04%	329
Ridgefield	229	43.21%	225	42.45%	72	13.58%	3	0.57%	1	0.19%	0	0.00%	4	0.75%	530
Rocky Hill	96	38.71%	108	43.55%	30	12.10%	12	4.84%	2	0.81%	0	0.00%	-12	-4.84%	248
Roxbury	71	44.65%	75	47.17%	13	8.18%	0	0.00%	0	0.00%	0	0.00%	-4	-2.52%	159
Salem	24	30.38%	34	43.04%	20	25.32%	1	1.27%	0	0.00%	0	0.00%	-10	-12.66%	79
Salisbury	207	34.91%	315	53.12%	64	10.79%	2	0.34%	4	0.67%	1	0.17%	-108	-18.21%	593
Saybrook	154	36.24%	148	34.82%	116	27.29%	4	0.94%	3	0.71%	0	0.00%	6	1.41%	425
Scotland	21	21.21%	60	60.61%	11	11.11%	0	0.00%	7	7.07%	0	0.00%	-39	-39.39%	99
Seymour	302	34.63%	416	47.71%	121	13.88%	24	2.75%	6	0.69%	3	0.34%	-114	-13.07%	872
Sharon	156	40.73%	194	50.65%	27	7.05%	2	0.52%	3	0.78%	1	0.26%	-38	-9.92%	383
Sherman	36	32.43%	44	39.64%	31	27.93%	0	0.00%	0	0.00%	0	0.00%	-8	-7.21%	111
Simsbury	204	41.30%	240	48.58%	39	7.89%	1	0.20%	10	2.02%	0	0.00%	-36	-7.29%	494
Somers	104	39.85%	148	56.70%	6	2.30%	1	0.38%	2	0.77%	0	0.00%	-44	-16.86%	261
South Windsor	135	38.46%	169	48.15%	35	9.97%	5	1.42%	7	1.99%	0	0.00%	-34	-9.69%	351
Southbury	107	41.80%	118	46.09%	27	10.55%	1	0.39%	3	1.17%	0	0.00%	-11	-4.30%	256
Southington	399	34.97%	416	36.46%	209	18.32%	95	8.33%	11	0.96%	11	0.96%	-17	-1.49%	1,141
Sprague	159	45.69%	100	28.74%	60	17.24%	19	5.46%	6	1.72%	4	1.15%	59	16.95%	348
Stafford	348	42.44%	372	45.37%	56	6.83%	31	3.78%	11	1.34%	2	0.24%	-24	-2.93%	820
Stamford	2,015	39.75%	1,623	32.02%	1,123	22.15%	210	4.14%	62	1.22%	36	0.71%	392	7.73%	5,069
Sterling	119	48.97%	110	45.27%	9	3.70%	3	1.23%	1	0.41%	1	0.41%	9	3.70%	243
Stonington	645	35.99%	714	39.84%	242	13.50%	124	6.92%	28	1.56%	39	2.18%	-69	-3.85%	1,792
Stratford	232	21.99%	390	36.97%	364	34.50%	47	4.45%	9	0.85%	13	1.23%	26	2.46%	1,055
Suffield	193	28.22%	400	58.48%	80	11.70%	5	0.73%	5	0.73%	1	0.15%	-207	-30.26%	684
Thomaston	225	31.82%	323	45.69%	141	19.94%	12	1.70%	4	0.57%	2	0.28%	-98	-13.86%	707
Thompson	153	31.68%	206	42.65%	101	20.91%	11	2.28%	11	2.28%	1	0.21%	-53	-10.97%	483
Tolland	101	54.59%	53	28.65%	18	9.73%	5	2.70%	6	3.24%	2	1.08%	48	25.95%	185
Torrington	801	28.35%	1,165	41.24%	710	25.13%	108	3.82%	24	0.85%	17	0.60%	-364	-12.88%	2,825
Trumbull	111	37.76%	108	36.73%	64	21.77%	8	2.72%	2	0.68%	1	0.34%	3	1.02%	294
Union	17	25.76%	44	66.67%	5	7.58%	0	0.00%	0	0.00%	0	0.00%	-27	-40.91%	66
Vernon	657	39.15%	611	36.41%	144	8.58%	223	13.29%	12	0.72%	31	1.85%	46	2.74%	1,678
Voluntown	70	43.21%	84	51.85%	6	3.70%	2	1.23%	0	0.00%	0	0.00%	-14	-8.64%	162
Wallingford	814	40.20%	750	37.04%	332	16.40%	101	4.99%	16	0.79%	12	0.59%	64	3.16%	2,025
Warren	44	50.00%	36	40.91%	7	7.95%	1	1.14%	0	0.00%	0	0.00%	8	9.09%	88
Washington	145	39.08%	122	32.88%	98	26.42%	1	0.27%	5	1.35%	0	0.00%	23	6.20%	371
Waterbury	4,440	42.80%	3,261	31.43%	1,675	16.14%	787	7.59%	99	0.95%	113	1.09%	1,179	11.36%	10,375
Waterford	274	50.65%	136	25.14%	109	20.15%	12	2.22%	7	1.29%	3	0.55%	138	25.51%	541
Watertown	167	26.72%	347	55.52%	91	14.56%	11	1.76%	7	1.12%	2	0.32%	-180	-28.80%	625
West Hartford	281	29.42%	432	45.24%	194	20.31%	23	2.41%	19	1.99%	6	0.63%	-151	-15.81%	955
Westbrook	77	39.09%	84	42.64%	27	13.71%	2	1.02%	4	2.03%	3	1.52%	-7	-3.55%	197
Weston	62	34.83%	87	48.88%	24	13.48%	4	2.25%	1	0.56%	0	0.00%	-25	-14.04%	178
Westport	278	42.12%	240	36.36%	130	19.70%	7	1.06%	4	0.61%	1	0.15%	38	5.76%	660
Wethersfield	170	35.86%	223	47.05%	61	12.87%	13	2.74%	6	1.27%	1	0.21%	-53	-11.18%	474
Willington	30	17.14%	103	58.86%	31	17.71%	6	3.43%	4	2.29%	1	0.57%	72	41.14%	175
Wilton	96	28.92%	166	50.00%	59	17.77%	2	0.60%	9	2.71%	0	0.00%	-70	-21.08%	332
Winchester	584	33.03%	767	43.38%	348	19.68%	43	2.43%	21	1.19%	5	0.28%	-183	-10.35%	1,768
Windham	948	47.05%	729	36.18%	260	12.90%	28	1.39%	46	2.28%	4	0.20%	219	10.87%	2,015
Windsor	354	42.91%	342	41.45%	86	10.42%	27	3.27%	15	1.82%	1	0.12%	12	1.45%	825
Windsor Locks	314	51.99%	234	38.74%	34	5.63%	15	2.48%	3	0.50%	4	0.66%	80	13.25%	604
Wolcott	18	26.09%	38	55.07%	11	15.94%	2	2.90%	0	0.00%	0	0.00%	-20	-28.99%	69
Woodbridge	40	28.99%	73	52.90%	19	13.77%	2	1.45%	3	2.17%	1	0.72%	-33	-23.91%	138
Woodbury	98	26.42%	172	46.36%	87	23.45%	5	1.35%	9	2.43%	0	0.00%	-74	-19.95%	371
Woodstock	73	24.50%	119	39.93%	93	31.21%	4	1.34%	9	3.02%	0	0.00%	26	8.72%	298
Totals	74,561	39.16%	68,324	35.88%	34,129	17.93%	10,056	5.28%	2,068	1.09%	1,260	0.66%	6,237	3.28%	190,398

== See also ==
- United States presidential elections in Connecticut
