= Connecticut Route 47 =

State highway in Litchfield County, Connecticut, US

Route 47
- Map of Litchfield County in northwestern Connecticut with Route 47 highlighted in red

Route information
- Maintained by CTDOT
- Length: 12.27 mi (19.75 km)
- Existed: 1932–present

Major junctions
- South end: US 6 in Woodbury
- North end: US 202 in Washington

Location
- Country: United States
- State: Connecticut
- Counties: Litchfield

Highway system
- Connecticut State Highway System; Interstate; US; State; SSR; SR; Scenic
← Route 45	→ Route 49

Route 47 is a Connecticut state highway from US 6 in Woodbury to US 202 in Washington, in the western south-central part of the state. It is 12.27 miles (19.75 km) long and runs roughly northwest-southeast, signed north–south.

== Route description ==
Route 47 begins at an intersection with U.S. Route 6 in North Woodbury and heads northwestward as Washington Road. It crosses the Nonnewaug River 0.6 miles (0.97 km) later, then Route 132 (for Bethlehem) splits off to the north after another 0.7 miles (1.1 km) . The road then travels for 3.5 miles (5.6 km) through rural northwestern Woodbury and enters the town of Roxbury. Route 47 travels briefly through the northeast corner of Roxbury where it is known as Washington-Woodbury Road. After 0.8 miles (1.3 km), Route 47 then enters the town of Washington, becoming Woodbury Road. After another 2.4 miles (3.9 km) through rural southern Washington, Route 47 meets with Route 199 in the town center. Continuing north as Green Hill Road for another mile, Route 47 soon crosses the Shepaug River into Washington Depot, where it has a junction with Route 109. Route 47 and Route 109 turn right together on Bee Brook Road as they leave the village. Route 109 splits off to the east (for Morris) about 0.3 miles (0.48 km) later while Route 47 heads north. Route 47 re-crosses the Shepaug River in the vicinity of the Bee Brook Rest Area, a picnic area along the highway. The road ends after another 1.9 miles (3.1 km) at an intersection with U.S. Route 202 in northern Washington, just east of New Preston.

== History ==
In October 1803, the Woodbury to Washington road was chartered as a toll road known as the Washington Turnpike. It ran from Woodbury center through Washington center up to the village of New Preston. The turnpike used modern Route 47 from Woodbury to Washington Depot, then used Baldwin Hill Road to reach New Preston. In 1922, most main highways in Connecticut were now managed by the state highway department. The Washington Turnpike alignment had been designated as State Highway 154. The new state highway had a slightly different northern alignment, using Bee Brook Road instead of Baldwin Hill Road. In the 1932 state highway renumbering, old Highway 154 became Route 47. No major changes have occurred since then.

== Junction list ==
The entire route is in Litchfield County.

Location	mi	km	Destinations	Notes
Woodbury	0.00	0.00	US 6 – Watertown, Southbury	Southern terminus
Woodbury	1.33	2.14	Route 132 north – Bethlehem	Southern terminus of Route 132
Washington	8.15	13.12	Route 199 south – Roxbury	Northern terminus of Route 199
Washington	9.17	14.76	Route 109 west – New Milford	Southern end of Route 109 concurrency
Washington	9.45	15.21	Route 109 east – Morris	Northern end of Route 109 concurrency
Washington	12.27	19.75	US 202 – Litchfield, New Milford	Northern terminus
1.000 mi = 1.609 km; 1.000 km = 0.621 mi
