= 1876 United States presidential election in Connecticut =

- November 7, 1876
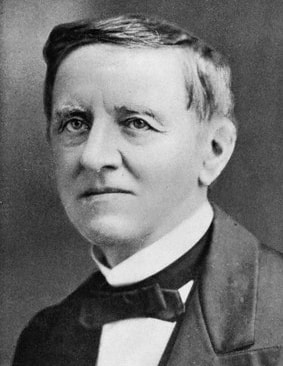

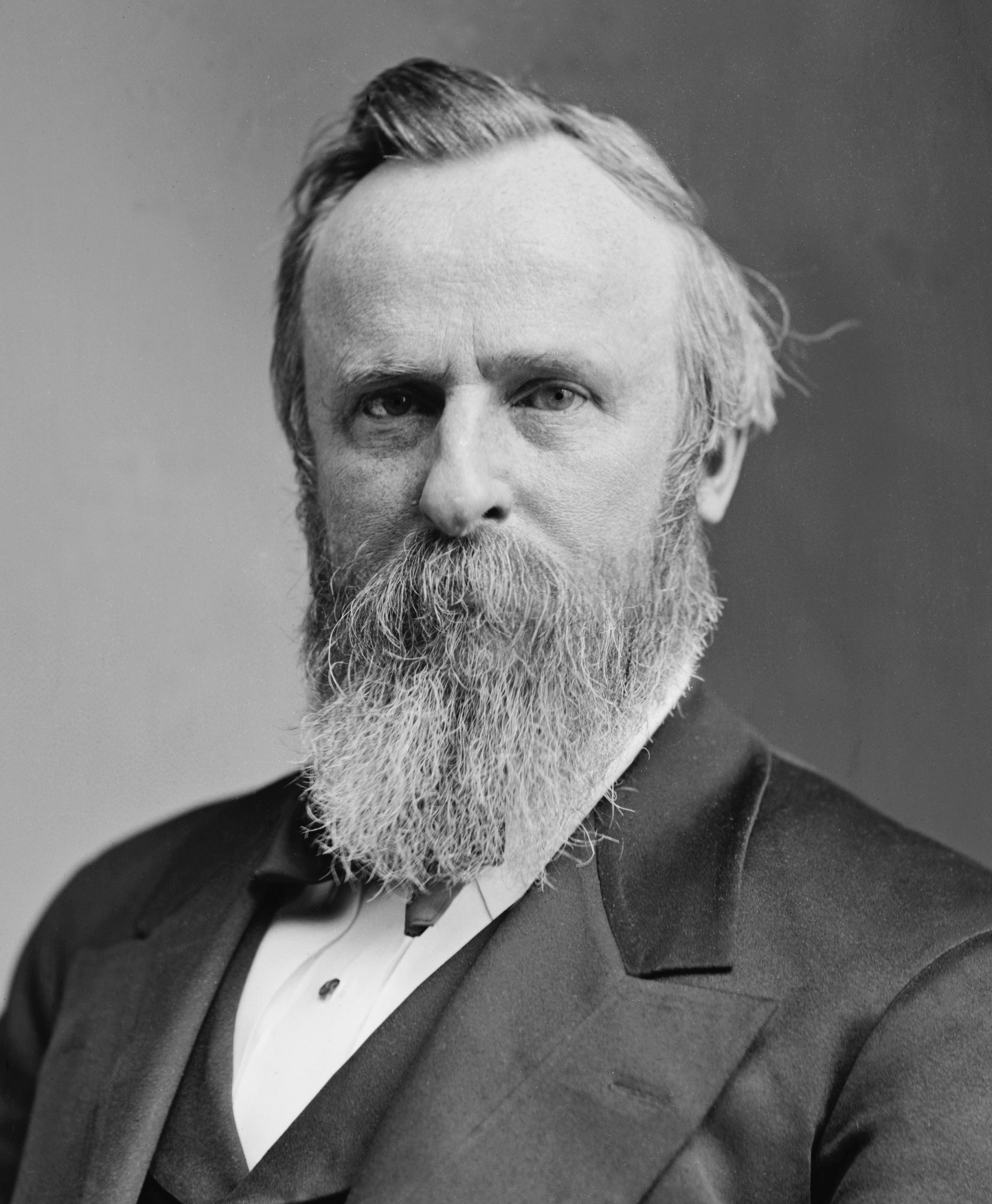
Nominee	Samuel J. Tilden	Rutherford B. Hayes
Party	Democratic	Republican
Home state	New York	Ohio
Running mate	Thomas A. Hendricks	William A. Wheeler
Electoral vote	6	0
Popular vote	61,927	59,033
Percentage	50.70%	48.33%

Tilden
50–60%
60–70%
70–80%
Hayes
50–60%
60–70%
70–80%
Tie
50%
President before election
Ulysses S. Grant
Republican
Elected President
Rutherford B. Hayes
Republican

The 1876 United States presidential election in Connecticut took place on November 7, 1876, as part of the 1876 United States presidential election. Voters chose six representatives, or electors to the Electoral College, who voted for president and vice president.

Connecticut voted for the Democratic nominee, Samuel J. Tilden, over the Republican nominee, Rutherford B. Hayes. Tilden won the state by a narrow margin of 2.37%. It was the first time since 1852 that a Democratic presidential candidate won Connecticut. Likewise, this was the first election in which a Republican presidential candidate won without Connecticut.

To date, this is the most recent presidential election in which the Democratic nominee carried the town of Hartland.

== Results ==
1876 United States presidential election in Connecticut
Party	Candidate	Running mate	Popular vote		Electoral vote	
Party	Candidate	Running mate	Count	%	Count	%
Democratic	Samuel J. Tilden of New York	Thomas A. Hendricks of Indiana	61,927	50.70%	6	100.00%
Republican	Rutherford B. Hayes of Ohio	William A. Wheeler of New York	59,033	48.33%	0	0.00%
Greenback	Peter Cooper of New York	Samuel Fenton Cary of Ohio	774	0.63%	0	0.00%
Prohibition	Green Clay Smith of Kentucky	Gideon Tabor Stewart of Ohio	374	0.31%	0	0.00%
N/A	Others	Others	26	0.02%	0	0.00%
Total			122,134	100.00%	6	100.00%

== See also ==
- United States presidential elections in Connecticut
