= Wildcat Hollow, Connecticut =

Coordinates: 41.9885°N 73.3709°W

Wildcat Hollow is a valley in the Appalachian Mountains in rural Litchfield County, Connecticut located on a riverbend of the Housatonic River. It is located about 3 miles west of Salisbury, 2 1/2 miles north of Falls Village, 2 miles south of Twin Lakes, and a mile north west of the peak of Mount Prospect. It also has two roads, Wildcat Hollow Road that heads North West up Flink Hill and Housatonic River Road that runs north from Amesville and Falls Village to the south up north to Smith Hill.
