= Kent Hollow, Connecticut =

Coordinates: 41.67°N 73.39°W

Kent Hollow is a valley in the Appalachian Mountains in the town of Kent in Litchfield County, Connecticut. It is situated in the upper reaches of the West Aspetuck River, one of the cleanest rivers in Southern New England and itself classified as AA water quality. The Hollow is occupied by five historic farms: Wilsea, DeVaux, Rehnberg, Camp and Anderson. It is threatened by development with several large homes built by New York weekenders in the past two decades.

It is located about 2 miles west of New Preston, about 2 miles northwest of Marble Dale, and about 6 miles southeast from the town center of Kent.
