= Bethlehem Green Historic District =

Historic district in Connecticut, United States

- U.S. National Register of Historic Places
- U.S. Historic district
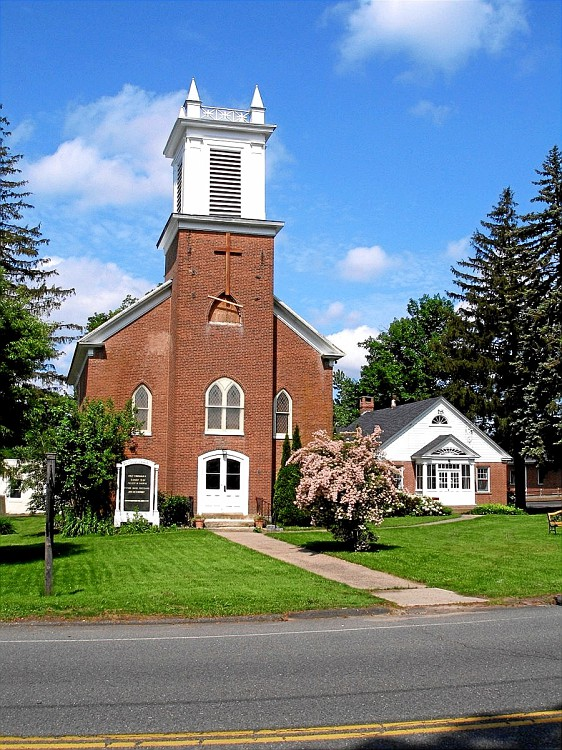
- Christ Episcopal Church

- Location within Connecticut Location within the United States
- Location: Parts of North Main Street, South Main Street, East Street, West Road, and Munger Lane, Bethlehem, Connecticut
- Coordinates: 41°38′16″N 73°12′32″W
- Area: 55 acres (22 ha)
- Architect: Multiple
- Architectural style: Greek Revival, Mixed (more than 2 styles from different periods)
- NRHP reference No.: 82001001
- Added to NRHP: December 16, 1982

The Bethlehem Green Historic District is a historic district in the center of the town of Bethlehem, Connecticut, listed on the National Register of Historic Places in 1982 for the architectural significance of the houses around the town green. The historic district includes the green and 63 contributing properties over an area of 55 acres (22 ha).

The Bethlehem Green is a triangular park bounded on the east by Route 61 (Main Street), on the north by Route 132 (West Road), and on the west by the street called "The Green". Within the green are five tablet monuments and a large green boulder monument listing names of Bethlehem residents who served in various wars from the American Revolution to World War II. A flagpole lies opposite the monuments. Maple trees have been planted around the perimeter of the green, and a large evergreen tree (decorated as a Christmas tree in winter) is located in the center of the green.

Historic buildings around the green include the Congregational church (1790), the townhouse (1839), the Episcopal Church (1832), two 18th-century taverns now used as residences, a general store built on the site of a former store built in the 19th century, and a former school building.

The district is also the site of the Bellamy-Ferriday House and Garden (Joseph Bellamy House), which is listed separately on the National Register of Historic Places, and of the original meetinghouse of Bethlehem built in 1767. The original meetinghouse no longer stands but its site is marked by a granite obelisk.

== See also ==
- National Register of Historic Places listings in Litchfield County, Connecticut
