= Litchfield County, Connecticut =

County in Connecticut, United States

- County
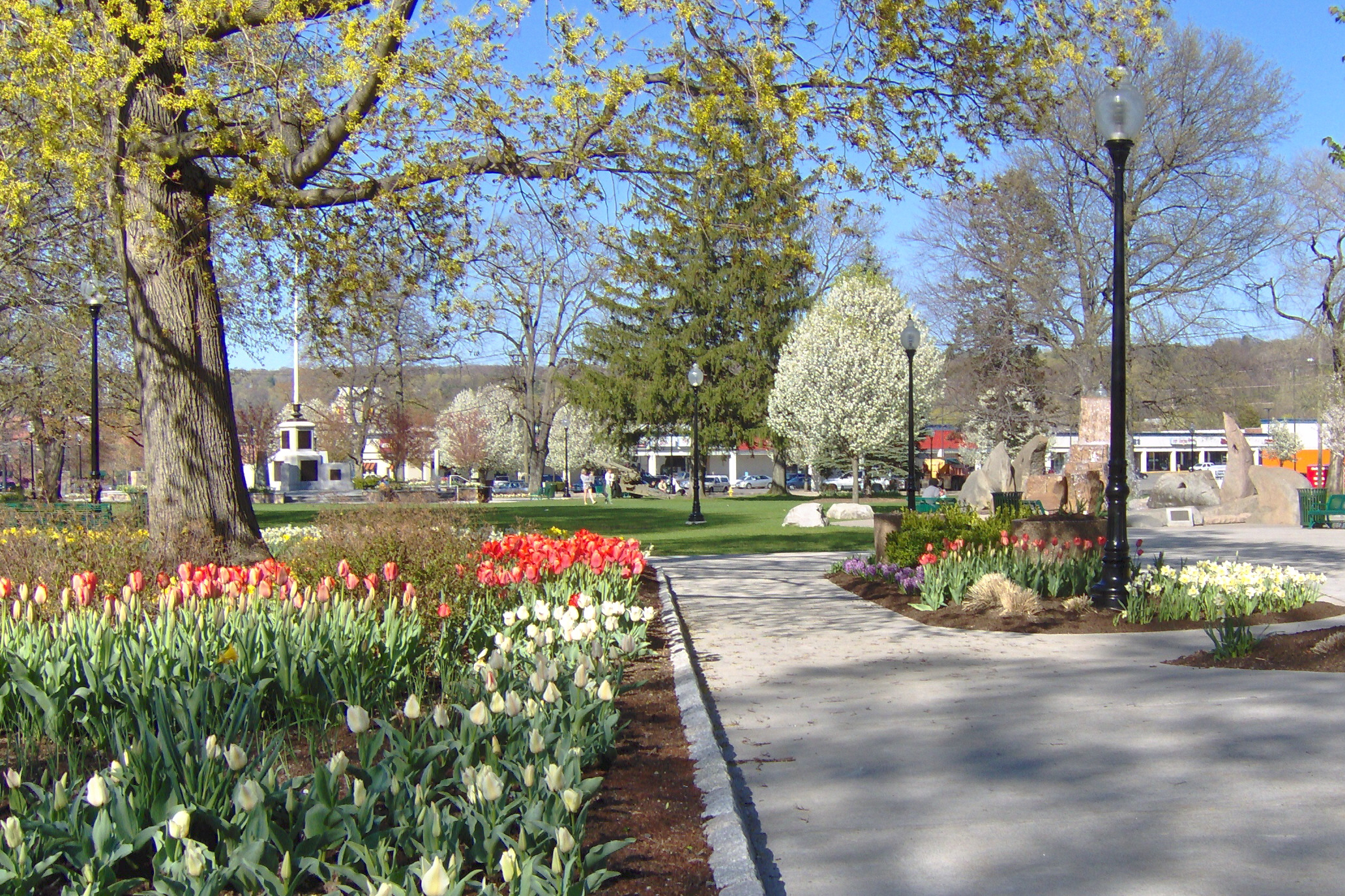
- Coe Memorial Park in Torrington

- Location within the U.S. state of Connecticut
- Coordinates: 41.79°N 73.24°W
- Country: United States
- State: Connecticut
- Founded: 1751
- Named for: Lichfield, England
- Seat: none (since 1960); Litchfield (before 1960)
- Largest city: Torrington (by population); New Milford (by area)

Area
  - Total: 945 sq mi (2,450 km^{2})
  - Land: 921 sq mi (2,390 km^{2})
  - Water: 24 sq mi (62 km^{2}) 2.5%

Population (2020)
  - Total: 185,186 ▼
  - Density: 196/sq mi (76/km^{2})
- Time zone: UTC−5 (Eastern)
  - Summer (DST): UTC−4 (EDT)
- Congressional districts: 1st, 5th

Interactive map of Litchfield County, Connecticut

Litchfield County is a county in northwestern Connecticut, United States. As of the 2020 census, the population was 185,186. The county was named after Lichfield, in England. Litchfield County has the lowest population density of any county in Connecticut and is the state's largest county by area.

Litchfield County comprises the Torrington, CT, Micropolitan Statistical Area, which is included in the New York–Newark, NY–NJ–CT–PA, Combined Statistical Area.

As is the case with the other seven Connecticut counties, there is no county government and no county seat. Each town is responsible for all local services such as schools, snow removal, sewers, and fire and police departments. However, in some cases in rural areas, adjoining towns may agree to jointly provide services or even establish a regional school system. On June 6, 2022, the U.S. Census Bureau formally recognized Connecticut's nine councils of governments as county equivalents instead of the state's eight counties. Connecticut's county governments were disbanded in 1960, and the councils of governments took over some of the local governmental functions. Connecticut's eight historical counties continue to exist in name only, and are no longer considered for statistical purposes.

== History ==
Litchfield County was created on October 9, 1751, by an act of the Connecticut General Court from land belonging to Fairfield, New Haven, and Hartford counties. The act establishing the county states:

That the townships of Litchfield, Woodbury, New Milford, Harwinton, New Hartford, Barkhempstead, Hartland, Colebrook, Norfolk, Canaan, Salisbury, Kent, Sharon, Cornwall, Goshen, Torrington, and Winchester, lying in the northwesterly part of this Colony, shall be and remain one entire county, and be called the County of Litchfield, and shall have and exercise the same powers, priviledges [sic] and authorities, and be subject to the same regulations, as the other counties in this Colony by law have and are subject unto. The bounds of which county shall extend north to the Colony line, and west to the Colony line till it meets with the township of New Fairfield, and to include the towns abovementioned.

Between 1780 and 1807, several new towns were created at the boundaries between Litchfield County and other counties in Connecticut. The town of Watertown was established in 1780 from Waterbury and was placed under Litchfield County jurisdiction. The establishment of the town of Brookfield from part of New Milford in 1788 resulted in Litchfield County losing territory to Fairfield County. In 1796, the town of Hartland was transferred to Hartford County. In 1798, the town of Oxford was established from part of Southbury causing Litchfield County to lose territory to New Haven County. In 1807, the town of Southbury was transferred to New Haven County. The final boundary change occurred on October 8, 1807, when the town of Middlebury was established from part of Woodbury.

In 1862, during the Civil War, Litchfield County raised the 2nd Connecticut Regiment of Volunteers Heavy Artillery. This regiment, originally the 19th Connecticut Volunteer Infantry, served in the defense of Washington, D.C. from September 1862 to March 1864, at which time it was transferred to the Army of the Potomac. On June 1, 1864, the 2nd Connecticut Heavy Artillery fought as infantry (as it continued to do through the war) in the Battle of Cold Harbor, experiencing the heaviest proportionate losses of any Connecticut regiment in the Civil War. The regiment remained active to the end of the war, and its final mustering out September 5, 1865.

== Geography ==
According to the U.S. Census Bureau, the county has a total area of 945 square miles (2,450 km^{2}), of which 921 square miles (2,390 km^{2}) is land and 24 square miles (62 km^{2}) (2.5%) is water. It is the largest county in Connecticut by area. Litchfield County is roughly contiguous with the portion of the Appalachian Mountains range known as the Berkshire Mountains (sometimes locally, this area is called the Litchfield Hills).

=== Adjacent counties ===
- Berkshire County, Massachusetts (north)
- Hampden County, Massachusetts (northeast)
- Hartford County (east)
- New Haven County (southeast)
- Fairfield County (south)
- Dutchess County, New York (west)

== Demographics ==
Historical population
Census	Pop.	Note	%±
1790	38,635		—
1800	41,214		6.7%
1810	41,375		0.4%
1820	41,267		−0.3%
1830	42,858		3.9%
1840	40,448		−5.6%
1850	45,253		11.9%
1860	47,318		4.6%
1870	48,727		3.0%
1880	52,044		6.8%
1890	53,542		2.9%
1900	63,672		18.9%
1910	70,260		10.3%
1920	76,262		8.5%
1930	82,556		8.3%
1940	87,041		5.4%
1950	98,872		13.6%
1960	119,856		21.2%
1970	144,091		20.2%
1980	156,769		8.8%
1990	174,092		11.1%
2000	182,193		4.7%
2010	189,927		4.2%
2020	185,186		−2.5%
U.S. Decennial Census; 1790–1960 1900–1990; 1990–2000 2010–2018

=== 2020 census ===
As of the 2020 census, the county had a population of 185,186. Of the residents, 18.0% were under the age of 18 and 22.0% were 65 years of age or older; the median age was 47.8 years. For every 100 females there were 97.4 males, and for every 100 females age 18 and over there were 95.7 males. 54.5% of residents lived in urban areas and 45.5% lived in rural areas.

The racial makeup of the county was 85.7% White, 1.8% Black or African American, 0.3% American Indian and Alaska Native, 1.9% Asian, 0.0% Native Hawaiian and Pacific Islander, 3.2% from some other race, and 7.0% from two or more races. Hispanic or Latino residents of any race comprised 7.9% of the population.

There were 77,502 households in the county, of which 24.6% had children under the age of 18 living with them and 25.0% had a female householder with no spouse or partner present. About 29.3% of all households were made up of individuals and 13.9% had someone living alone who was 65 years of age or older.

There were 87,615 housing units, of which 11.5% were vacant. Among occupied housing units, 74.2% were owner-occupied and 25.8% were renter-occupied. The homeowner vacancy rate was 1.5% and the rental vacancy rate was 6.0%.

=== Racial and ethnic composition ===
Litchfield County, Connecticut – Racial and ethnic composition Note: the US Census treats Hispanic/Latino as an ethnic category. This table excludes Latinos from the racial categories and assigns them to a separate category. Hispanics/Latinos may be of any race.
Race / Ethnicity (NH = Non-Hispanic)	Pop 1980	Pop 1990	Pop 2000	Pop 2010	Pop 2020	% 1980	% 1990	% 2000	% 2010	% 2020
White alone (NH)	153,452	168,876	172,154	173,403	155,601	97.88%	97.00%	94.49%	91.30%	84.02%
Black or African American alone (NH)	1,206	1,561	1,837	2,206	2,957	0.77%	0.90%	1.01%	1.16%	1.60%
Native American or Alaska Native alone (NH)	221	300	279	284	268	0.14%	0.17%	0.15%	0.15%	0.14%
Asian alone (NH)	486	1,386	2,107	2,877	3,434	0.31%	0.80%	1.16%	1.51%	1.85%
Native Hawaiian or Pacific Islander alone (NH)	x	x	35	41	63	x	x	0.02%	0.02%	0.03%
Other race alone (NH)	275	62	203	239	931	0.18%	0.04%	0.11%	0.13%	0.50%
Mixed race or Multiracial (NH)	x	x	1,684	2,342	7,352	x	x	0.92%	1.23%	3.97%
Hispanic or Latino (any race)	1,129	1,907	3,894	8,535	14,580	0.72%	1.10%	2.14%	4.49%	7.87%
Total	156,769	174,092	182,193	189,927	185,186	100.00%	100.00%	100.00%	100.00%	100.00%

=== 2010 census ===
As of the 2010 United States census, there were 189,927 people, 76,640 households, and 51,530 families residing in the county. The population density was 206.3 inhabitants per square mile (79.7/km^{2}). There were 87,550 housing units at an average density of 95.1 per square mile (36.7/km^{2}). The racial makeup of the county was 93.9% white, 1.5% Asian, 1.3% black or African American, 0.2% American Indian, 1.4% from other races, and 1.6% from two or more races. Those of Hispanic or Latino origin made up 4.5% of the population. In terms of ancestry, 23.0% were Italian, 21.3% were Irish, 14.8% were English, 14.5% were German, 8.3% were Polish, and 3.3% were American.

Of the 76,640 households, 29.9% had children under the age of 18 living with them, 53.7% were married couples living together, 9.4% had a female householder with no husband present, 32.8% were non-families, and 26.6% of all households were made up of individuals. The average household size was 2.44 and the average family size was 2.97. The median age was 44.4 years.

The median income for a household in the county was $69,639 and the median income for a family was $84,890. Males had a median income of $57,362 versus $42,729 for females. The per capita income for the county was $35,848. About 3.6% of families and 5.8% of the population were below the poverty line, including 6.9% of those under age 18 and 4.6% of those age 65 or over.

=== 2000 census ===
As of the census of 2000, there were 182,193 people, 71,551 households, and 49,584 families residing in the county. The population density was 198 inhabitants per square mile (76/km^{2}). There were 79,267 housing units at an average density of 86/sq mi (33/km^{2}). The racial makeup of the county was 95.77% White, 1.10% Black or African American, 0.18% Native American, 1.17% Asian, 0.02% Pacific Islander, 0.68% from other races, and 1.09% from two or more races. 2.14% of the population were Hispanic or Latino of any race. 20.8% were of Italian, 14.8% Irish, 10.6% English, 9.2% German and 6.3% French ancestry. 92.3% spoke English, 2.1% Spanish, 1.6% Italian and 1.2% French as their first language.

There were 71,551 households, out of which 32.10% had children under the age of 18 living with them, 57.20% were married couples living together, 8.60% had a female householder with no husband present, and 30.70% were non-families. 25.30% of all households were made up of individuals, and 10.20% had someone living alone who was 65 years of age or older. The average household size was 2.51 and the average family size was 3.03.

In the county, the population was spread out, with 24.60% under the age of 18, 5.70% from 18 to 24, 29.80% from 25 to 44, 25.70% from 45 to 64, and 14.20% who were 65 years of age or older. The median age was 40 years. For every 100 females, there were 95.60 males. For every 100 females age 18 and over, there were 92.50 males.

The median income for a household in the county was $56,273, and the median income for a family was $66,445 (these figures had risen to $67,591 and $81,752 respectively as of a 2007 estimate). Males had a median income of $45,586 versus $31,870 for females. The per capita income for the county was $28,408. About 2.70% of families and 4.50% of the population were below the poverty line, including 4.30% of those under age 18 and 5.40% of those age 65 or over.

=== Demographic breakdown by town ===
==== Income ====
Data is from the 2010 United States Census and the 2006-2010 American Community Survey 5-Year Estimates.

Rank	Town		Per capita income	Median household income	Median family income	Population	Number of households
1	Roxbury	Town	$65,236	$97,768	$119,091	2,262	936
2	Bridgewater	Town	$58,172	$86,607	$105,568	1,727	735
3	Washington	Town	$51,907	$67,417	$84,833	3,578	1,512
4	Kent	Town	$51,772	$68,481	$82,260	2,979	1,246
5	Cornwall	Town	$50,901	$80,179	$97,500	1,420	628
6	Warren	Town	$49,142	$87,857	$94,583	1,461	601
7	Salisbury	Town	$47,361	$63,587	$76,719	3,741	1,693
8	Woodbury	Town	$44,060	$80,595	$100,500	9,975	4,214
9	Norfolk	Town	$43,866	$85,526	$98,098	1,709	720
10	Sharon	Town	$43,317	$70,104	$74,313	2,782	1,250
11	New Hartford	Town	$41,709	$80,718	$90,172	6,970	2,632
12	Litchfield	Town	$41,649	$78,750	$100,833	8,466	3,459
13	Litchfield	Borough	$40,635	$68,125	$81,875	1,258	548
14	Bethlehem	Town	$39,704	$82,899	$86,792	3,607	1,411
15	Goshen	Town	$39,562	$76,705	$86,114	2,976	1,192
16	Colebrook	Town	$39,324	$72,000	$85,833	1,485	589
17	New Milford	Town	$38,893	$84,824	$100,574	28,142	10,618
18	Harwinton	Town	$37,902	$85,253	$92,083	5,642	2,170
19	Canaan	Town	$37,283	$54,219	$77,500	1,234	583
20	Morris	Town	$36,682	$81,583	$97,381	2,388	958
21	Barkhamsted	Town	$34,775	$87,656	$107,804	3,799	1,452
22	Watertown	Town	$34,158	$77,771	$93,194	22,514	8,672
23	Thomaston	Town	$31,652	$63,990	$77,842	7,887	3,108
24	Plymouth	Town	$30,081	$71,630	$82,438	12,243	4,803
25	Winchester	Town	$27,264	$57,958	$68,622	11,242	4,815
26	North Canaan	Town	$26,700	$46,417	$52,604	3,315	1,400
27	Torrington	City	$25,948	$48,409	$64,476	36,383	15,243
28	Winsted	City	$25,291	$61,404	$68,406	7,712	3,346
29	Bantam	Borough	$24,284	$42,256	$54,063	759	372

==== Race ====
Data is from the 2007-2011 American Community Survey 5-Year Estimates, ACS Demographic and Housing Estimates, "Race alone or in combination with one or more other races."

Rank	Town		Population	White	Black	Asian	American Indian	Other	Hispanic
1	Torrington	City	36,380	93.6%	3.5%	2.9%	1.1%	1.8%	6.8%
2	New Milford	Town	28,122	92.6%	3.9%	2.7%	0.6%	1.8%	5.2%
3	Watertown	Town	22,502	96.1%	1.6%	2.2%	0.6%	0.9%	2.5%
4	Plymouth	Town	12,218	98.1%	1.1%	0.0%	1.4%	1.0%	3.6%
5	Winchester	Town	11,216	95.3%	1.3%	1.4%	0.8%	2.6%	9.9%
6	Woodbury	Town	9,928	97.9%	0.6%	1.8%	0.7%	0.3%	4.0%
7	Litchfield	Town	8,484	97.6%	1.5%	1.2%	0.2%	0.7%	3.1%
8	Thomaston	Town	7,862	98.0%	1.2%	0.9%	1.0%	0.7%	1.4%
9	Winsted	City	7,402	93.3%	1.5%	1.9%	1.3%	3.7%	13.2%
10	New Hartford	Town	6,901	96.0%	0.6%	3.9%	0.0%	0.0%	0.7%
11	Harwinton	Town	5,618	97.7%	0.0%	2.3%	0.5%	0.0%	0.0%
12	Barkhamsted	Town	3,783	99.8%	0.4%	0.2%	0.0%	0.0%	0.3%
13	Salisbury	Town	3,783	95.3%	2.6%	3.8%	1.3%	2.0%	2.2%
14	Bethlehem	Town	3,596	99.4%	0.1%	0.8%	0.2%	0.0%	0.9%
15	Washington	Town	3,586	94.0%	2.9%	0.9%	0.2%	3.0%	9.6%
16	North Canaan	Town	3,329	96.3%	1.4%	2.3%	0.0%	0.0%	2.2%
17	Kent	Town	2,982	98.5%	0.3%	0.8%	0.7%	0.0%	0.3%
18	Goshen	Town	2,957	99.1%	0.1%	0.7%	0.4%	0.2%	5.5%
19	Sharon	Town	2,804	92.0%	0.4%	1.4%	0.3%	6.8%	8.5%
20	Morris	Town	2,411	99.0%	1.0%	0.0%	0.0%	0.0%	0.4%
21	Roxbury	Town	2,315	99.0%	0.0%	0.3%	1.3%	0.3%	5.3%
22	Bridgewater	Town	1,790	96.6%	1.7%	1.3%	0.3%	1.9%	6.2%
23	Norfolk	Town	1,574	97.2%	0.7%	1.5%	2.1%	0.5%	2.2%
24	Warren	Town	1,531	98.5%	0.0%	0.9%	0.3%	1.0%	3.0%
25	Cornwall	Town	1,469	99.0%	0.5%	1.0%	0.0%	0.8%	2.2%
26	Litchfield	Borough	1,420	98.6%	0.0%	1.9%	0.0%	0.4%	4.2%
27	Colebrook	Town	1,395	99.4%	0.5%	0.0%	0.8%	0.0%	0.6%
28	Canaan	Town	1,183	97.5%	1.6%	0.2%	0.2%	1.0%	2.8%
29	Bantam	Borough	731	96.0%	3.6%	1.5%	0.3%	2.2%	4.4%

== Politics ==
Litchfield County has voted for Republican presidential candidates more often than the rest of the state. In 2004 Bush won 52% to Kerry's 46%, making Litchfield the only county in southern New England that Bush carried. Litchfield was one of two Connecticut counties won by George H. W. Bush in 1992. But in 2008, no county in Connecticut, including Litchfield, was won by Republican candidate John McCain. The county also went for the Democratic presidential candidate in 1964, 1996, and 2000. In 2012 it was the only county won by Mitt Romney in the state. In 2016, 2020 and 2024, Donald Trump won the county, with his 2024 campaign receiving the highest raw number (but not percentage) of votes for a Republican candidate in the county's history.

United States presidential election results for Litchfield County, Connecticut
Year	Republican		Democratic		Third party(ies)	
Year	No.	%	No.	%	No.	%
1884	5,442	46.05%	5,912	50.03%	464	3.93%
1888	6,080	49.21%	5,790	46.87%	484	3.92%
1892	6,186	49.32%	5,902	47.05%	455	3.63%
1896	8,395	66.88%	3,352	26.70%	806	6.42%
1900	8,534	64.14%	4,554	34.23%	218	1.64%
1904	8,797	64.55%	4,500	33.02%	332	2.44%
1908	8,978	66.21%	4,128	30.44%	454	3.35%
1912	5,518	42.00%	4,661	35.48%	2,959	22.52%
1916	7,288	53.00%	6,183	44.96%	280	2.04%
1920	14,405	65.94%	6,938	31.76%	504	2.31%
1924	15,499	61.35%	6,645	26.30%	3,120	12.35%
1928	19,157	63.73%	10,766	35.81%	138	0.46%
1932	18,682	56.94%	13,469	41.05%	660	2.01%
1936	18,850	50.68%	17,468	46.97%	875	2.35%
1940	22,956	53.96%	19,537	45.92%	49	0.12%
1944	24,019	55.24%	19,212	44.19%	248	0.57%
1948	26,848	57.99%	18,628	40.23%	823	1.78%
1952	35,735	63.81%	20,163	36.00%	107	0.19%
1956	40,029	69.91%	17,226	30.09%	0	0.00%
1960	34,043	53.94%	29,062	46.05%	3	0.00%
1964	20,834	34.12%	40,172	65.78%	62	0.10%
1968	31,429	48.82%	29,340	45.57%	3,611	5.61%
1972	43,478	60.20%	27,929	38.67%	812	1.12%
1976	40,705	55.32%	32,419	44.06%	459	0.62%
1980	38,725	50.72%	26,705	34.98%	10,924	14.31%
1984	52,583	66.21%	26,564	33.45%	269	0.34%
1988	44,637	55.97%	34,227	42.91%	893	1.12%
1992	34,492	37.00%	33,686	36.14%	25,035	26.86%
1996	31,645	38.88%	37,375	45.92%	12,378	15.21%
2000	39,172	44.85%	41,806	47.87%	6,360	7.28%
2004	50,160	51.89%	44,647	46.19%	1,861	1.93%
2008	46,173	46.66%	51,041	51.57%	1,752	1.77%
2012	47,201	51.07%	43,856	47.45%	1,370	1.48%
2016	53,051	54.44%	39,775	40.82%	4,616	4.74%
2020	55,601	51.70%	50,164	46.65%	1,779	1.65%
2024	56,452	53.27%	47,940	45.24%	1,577	1.49%

United States Senate election results for Litchfield County, Connecticut1
Year	Republican		Democratic		Third party(ies)	
Year	No.	%	No.	%	No.	%
2012	48,316	54.05%	39,577	44.28%	1,492	1.67%
2018	43,621	51.75%	39,593	46.97%	1,080	1.28%
2024	52,285	47.62%	49,766	45.33%	7,744	7.05%

United States Senate election results for Litchfield County, Connecticut2
Year	Republican		Democratic		Third party(ies)	
Year	No.	%	No.	%	No.	%
2010	38,888	53.29%	32,824	44.98%	1,267	1.74%
2016	43,519	45.55%	49,872	52.20%	2,147	2.25%
2022	43,788	53.96%	37,345	46.02%	9	0.01%

Connecticut Gubernatorial election results for Litchfield County
Year	Republican		Democratic		Third party(ies)	
Year	No.	%	No.	%	No.	%
2010	42,111	58.34%	28,594	39.61%	1,483	2.05%
2014	40,992	59.20%	27,282	39.40%	974	1.41%
2018	49,280	57.69%	32,125	37.61%	4,015	4.70%
2022	44,282	54.18%	36,591	44.77%	858	1.05%

== Transportation ==
Litchfield is served by the Northwestern Connecticut Transit District.

== Communities ==
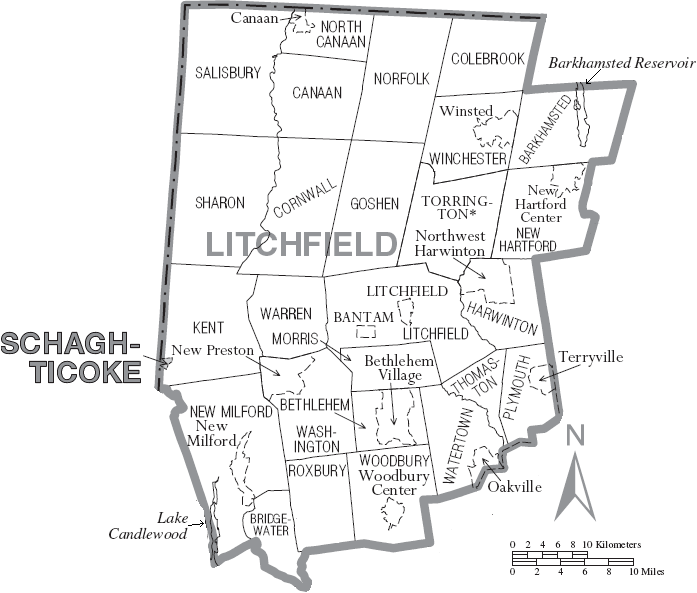
Map of Litchfield County, Connecticut showing cities, boroughs, towns, CDPs, and Indian Reservations

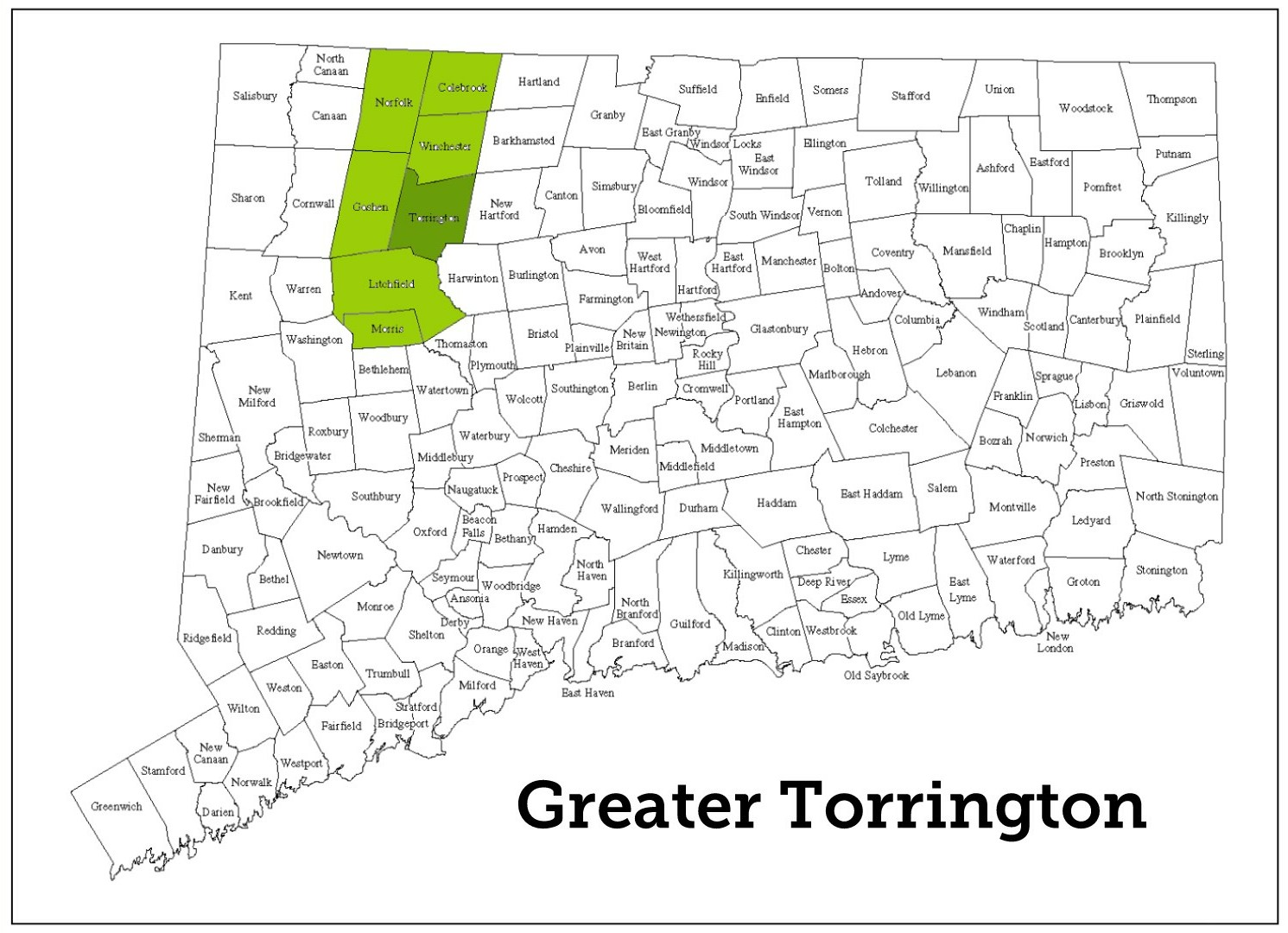
Map highlighting the Greater Torrington Micropolitan Area

Boroughs are incorporated portions of one or more towns with separate borough councils, zoning boards, and borough officials. Villages are named localities, but have no separate corporate existence from the towns they are in.

=== City ===
- Torrington

=== Towns ===
- Barkhamsted
  - Pleasant Valley
  - Riverton
- Bethlehem
  - Bethlehem Village
- Bridgewater
  - Bridgewater CDP
- Canaan
  - Falls Village
- Colebrook
- Cornwall
  - Cornwall
  - Cornwall Bridge
  - West Cornwall
- Goshen
  - West Goshen
- Harwinton
  - Northwest Harwinton
- Kent
  - Flanders
  - South Kent
- Litchfield
  - Bantam (Borough)
  - East Litchfield
  - Litchfield (Borough)
  - Northfield
- Morris
- New Hartford
  - New Hartford Center
  - Pine Meadow
- New Milford
  - Chimney Point
  - Erickson Corner
  - Gaylordsville
  - Merryall
  - New Milford CDP
  - Northville
- Norfolk
  - Norfolk CDP
- North Canaan
  - Canaan CDP
- Plymouth
  - East Plymouth
  - Terryville
- Roxbury
- Salisbury
  - Lakeville
  - Lime Rock
- Sharon
  - Sharon CDP
  - Sharon Valley
- Thomaston
  - Thomaston CDP
- Warren
- Washington
  - Marbledale
  - New Preston
  - Washington Depot
- Watertown
  - Watertown CDP
  - Oakville
- Winchester
  - Winsted
- Woodbury
  - Hotchkissville
  - Woodbury Center

=== Telephone area codes ===
All areas of the county are in area code 860 except for the towns of Woodbury, Bethlehem and a small part of Roxbury, which are in the area code 203/area code 475 overlay. The geographical Woodbury Telephone Exchange (of the now defunct Woodbury Telephone Company) serves the two towns as well as the town of Southbury, which is in New Haven County and the small part of Roxbury. Ten digit dialing took effect for both area codes on November 14, 2009, as a result of the 203/475 overlay and the planned but not implemented 860/959 overlay.

== Attractions ==
- Abbey of Regina Laudis
- Appalachian Trail in Connecticut
- Kent Falls State Park
- Litchfield Historic District
- Mohawk Mountain Ski Area
- West Cornwall Covered Bridge

== Education ==
School districts in the county follow municipal boundaries.

=== Full K-12 Districts ===
- Litchfield School District
- New Milford School District
- Plymouth School District
- Regional School District 06
- Regional School District 10
- Regional School District 12
- Regional School District 14
- Thomaston School District
- Torrington School District
- Watertown School District
- Winchester School District

=== Secondary-school Districts ===
- Regional High School District 01
- Regional High School District 07

(There is also a privately-endowed publicly funded secondary school, Gilbert School)

=== Elementary-school Districts ===
- Barkhamsted School District
- Canaan School District
- Colebrook School District
- Cornwall School District
- Kent School District
- New Hartford School District
- Norfolk School District
- North Canaan School District
- Salisbury School District
- Sharon School District

=== Private Schools ===
Litchfield County is home to a number of historic college-preparatory boarding schools, among which are:

- Canterbury School (1915), New Milford
- Forman School (1930), Litchfield
- The Gunnery (1850), Washington
- Hotchkiss School (1892), Lakeville
- Kent School (1906), Kent
- Marvelwood School (1956), Kent
- Salisbury School (1901), Salisbury
- South Kent School (1923), Kent
- Taft School (1890), Watertown
- The Woodhall School (1983), Bethlehem

Several schools provide boarding facilities for younger students with educational challenges:

- Glenholme School (1968), Washington; ages 10–21
- Indian Mountain School (1916), Lakeville; ages 10–15
- Rumsey Hall School (1900), Washington; ages 10–15

Private day schools:

- Arch Bridge School (3–12), Bethlehem
- Faith Preparatory School (K-12), New Milford
- Litchfield Montessori School (K-8), Northfield
- St. Anthony School (K-8), Winstead
- St. John Evangelist School (K-8), Watertown
- St. Mary Magdalen School (K-8), Oakville
- St. Peter/St. Francis School (K-8), Torrington
- Torrington Christian Academy (K-12), Torrington
- Touchstone School (9–11), Litchfield
- Washington Montessori School (K-8), New Preston

== See also ==
- Kent Hollow, Connecticut
- Litchfield Hills
- National Register of Historic Places listings in Litchfield County, Connecticut
- Torrington Titans Litchfield County's summer collegiate baseball team who play at Fuessenich Park in downtown Torrington.
- Wildcat Hollow, Connecticut
