= The Woodhall School =

Private school in Bethlehem, Connecticut, United States

Coordinates: 41.6356°N 73.2037°W

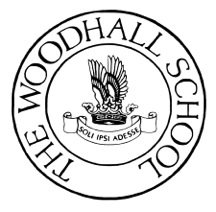

Location
- 58 Harrison Lane; Bethlehem, Connecticut 06751; United States

Information
- Type: Private, day and boarding, college-prep
- Motto: Soli Ipsi Adesse "Be present to the student alone himself"
- Established: 1983 (43 years ago)
- CEEB code: 070028
- NCES School ID: 02159308
- Head of school: Matthew C. Woodhall
- Faculty: 16
- Grades: 9-12
- Gender: Boys
- Enrollment: 42 (maximum)
- Student to teacher ratio: 3:1
- Campus size: 38 acres
- Campus type: Rural
- Colors: Maroon, gold, white
- Team name: The Phoenix
- Website: woodhallschool.org

The Woodhall School, located in Bethlehem, Connecticut, United States, is a small, independent boys' boarding school for students in grades 9-12. The school's individualized approach to teaching is intended for the unconventional learner, and utilizes multi-modal strategies to support learning. It was founded in 1983 by Sally Campbell Woodhall and Jonathan A. Woodhall, former Headmaster at the Oxford Academy. Sally Campbell Woodhall served in this role from 1983 to 2007; Matthew C. Woodhall became the second Head of School in 2008.

== Campus and facilities ==
The campus is located on a 38-acre campus in Bethlehem, Connecticut. The school enrolls a maximum of 42 students per school year, with sixteen full-time teachers. The majority of the faculty live on campus.

All students must complete 35 hours of service each school year, including theme-directed "Community Days".

== Activities ==
Woodhall's mascot is the Phoenix and the school colors are maroon, gold, and white. Soccer, cross-country, basketball, lacrosse, wrestling, outdoor challenge, and drama are the sports and intramural activities offered. Woodhall is part of the New England Preparatory School Athletic Conference (NEPSAC), Western Division, District 4.

The drama program is considered part of the athletics and activities program. The Woodhall Players participate in The Seven Angels Theatre Halo Awards, a regional secondary school drama competition.

== Affiliations ==
- New England Association of Schools and Colleges (NEASC)
- National Association of Independent Schools (NAIS)
- Connecticut Association of Independent Schools (CAIS)
- Small Boarding School Association
- Guide Star, Silver Member
