= Connecticut Route 132 =

State highway in Litchfield County, Connecticut, US

Route 132
- Map of Litchfield County in northwestern Connecticut with Route 132 highlighted in red

Route information
- Maintained by CTDOT
- Length: 10.97 mi (17.65 km)
- Existed: 1932–present

Major junctions
- South end: Route 47 in Woodbury
- North end: Route 63 in Watertown

Location
- Country: United States
- State: Connecticut
- Counties: Litchfield

Highway system
- Connecticut State Highway System; Interstate; US; State; SSR; SR; Scenic
← Route 131	→ Route 133

Route 132 is a state highway in western Connecticut, running from Route 47 in Woodbury, through Bethlehem center, to Route 63 in Watertown.

== Route description ==
Route 132 is one of Connecticut's most winding routes. It begins in the Hotchkissville section of Woodbury known as Weekeepeemee Road at an intersection with Route 47. It crosses the Weepeekeemee River about 1.6 miles (2.6 km) later, then bears left onto Carmel Hill Road after another 0.5 miles (0.80 km). Route 132 crosses into the town of Bethlehem as Carmel Hill Road South about a mile later. After running north for another mile, Route 132 then turns to the right following Guild Hollow Road, which travels east and northeast towards the town center of Bethlehem. After crossing the Weepeekeemee River a second time, Route 132 enters Bethlehem center, where it follows West Street and East Street, intersecting with Route 61 along the way. About 0.6 miles (0.97 km) east of the Route 61 junction, Route 132 then turns north onto Lakes Road, then turns east after another 0.6 miles (0.97 km) onto Kasson Road. Route 132 travels east for 1.3 miles (2.1 km) then turns south along the Bethlehem-Watertown town line (known as Old Watertown Road or Town Line Highway) for about 0.7 miles (1.1 km) before turning east into Watertown along Judd Farm Road. Route 132 ends at an intersection with Route 63 in northern Watertown.

== History ==
Route 132 was established in the 1932 state highway renumbering, originally running between Route 47 and Route 61. It was extended to Route 63 in 1955. The route was scheduled for removal from the state highway system as part of the 1962 Route Reclassification Act. The state, however, ultimately decided to retain maintenance of the road.

== Junction list ==
The entire route is in Litchfield County.

Location	mi	km	Destinations	Notes
Woodbury	0.00	0.00	Route 47 – Woodbury, Washington	Southern terminus
Bethlehem	6.86	11.04	Route 61 – Morris, Woodbury	
Watertown	10.97	17.65	Route 63 – Watertown, East Morris	Northern terminus
1.000 mi = 1.609 km; 1.000 km = 0.621 mi
