= Connecticut Route 61 =

State highway in Litchfield County, Connecticut, US

Route 61
- Map of Litchfield County in northwestern Connecticut with Route 61 highlighted in red

Route information
- Maintained by CTDOT
- Length: 9.16 mi (14.74 km)
- Existed: 1932–present

Major junctions
- South end: US 6 in Woodbury
- North end: Route 63 in Morris

Location
- Country: United States
- State: Connecticut
- Counties: Litchfield

Highway system
- Connecticut State Highway System; Interstate; US; State; SSR; SR; Scenic
| ← Route 59 | → Route 63 |

Route 61 is a secondary state highway in rural northwestern Connecticut connecting the towns of Woodbury and Morris. It serves as the main north–south highway within the towns of Bethlehem and Morris.

== Route description ==
Route 61 begins as Bethlehem Road at an intersection with US 6 in the northeastern corner of Woodbury, heading in a northwest direction then crossing the Nonewaug River before entering the town of Bethlehem. It heads directly into the Bethlehem town center and is locally known as Main Street South and Main Street North. Route 61 has a junction with Route 132 in the town center.

The road continues north, heading into the town of Morris, where it becomes known as South Street and North Street. After passing through the Morris town center, where it intersects with Route 109, the road changes name to County Road. Route 61 ends at an intersection with Route 63 in the northeastern part of the town of Morris. Route 61 is a two-lane rural collector road for its entire length.

== History ==
In the 1920s, the road connecting Woodbury to Goshen via Bethlehem and Morris was designated as State Highway 130. The road connected the various town centers of the towns it passed through. Modern Route 61 was established in the 1932 state highway renumbering from old State Highway 130, with the exception of the section to Woodbury center that is now modern US 6. The original Route 61 extended north past Goshen center to near the Canaan-Cornwall town line (at modern Route 43). In 1943, Route 61 was shortened to its current length, with the northern segment reassigned to an extension of Route 63.

== Junction list ==
The entire route is in Litchfield County.

| Location | mi | km | Destinations | Notes |
|---|---|---|---|---|
| Woodbury | 0.00 | 0.00 | US 6 – Southbury, Watertown | Southern terminus |
| Bethlehem | 4.12 | 6.63 | Route 132 – Watertown, Woodbury | |
| Morris | 7.29 | 11.73 | Route 109 – Thomaston, Washington | |
| Morris | 9.16 | 14.74 | Route 63 – Litchfield, Watertown | Northern terminus |
1.000 mi = 1.609 km; 1.000 km = 0.621 mi
