= Bethlehem Middle Works Historic District =

- U.S. National Register of Historic Places
- U.S. Historic district
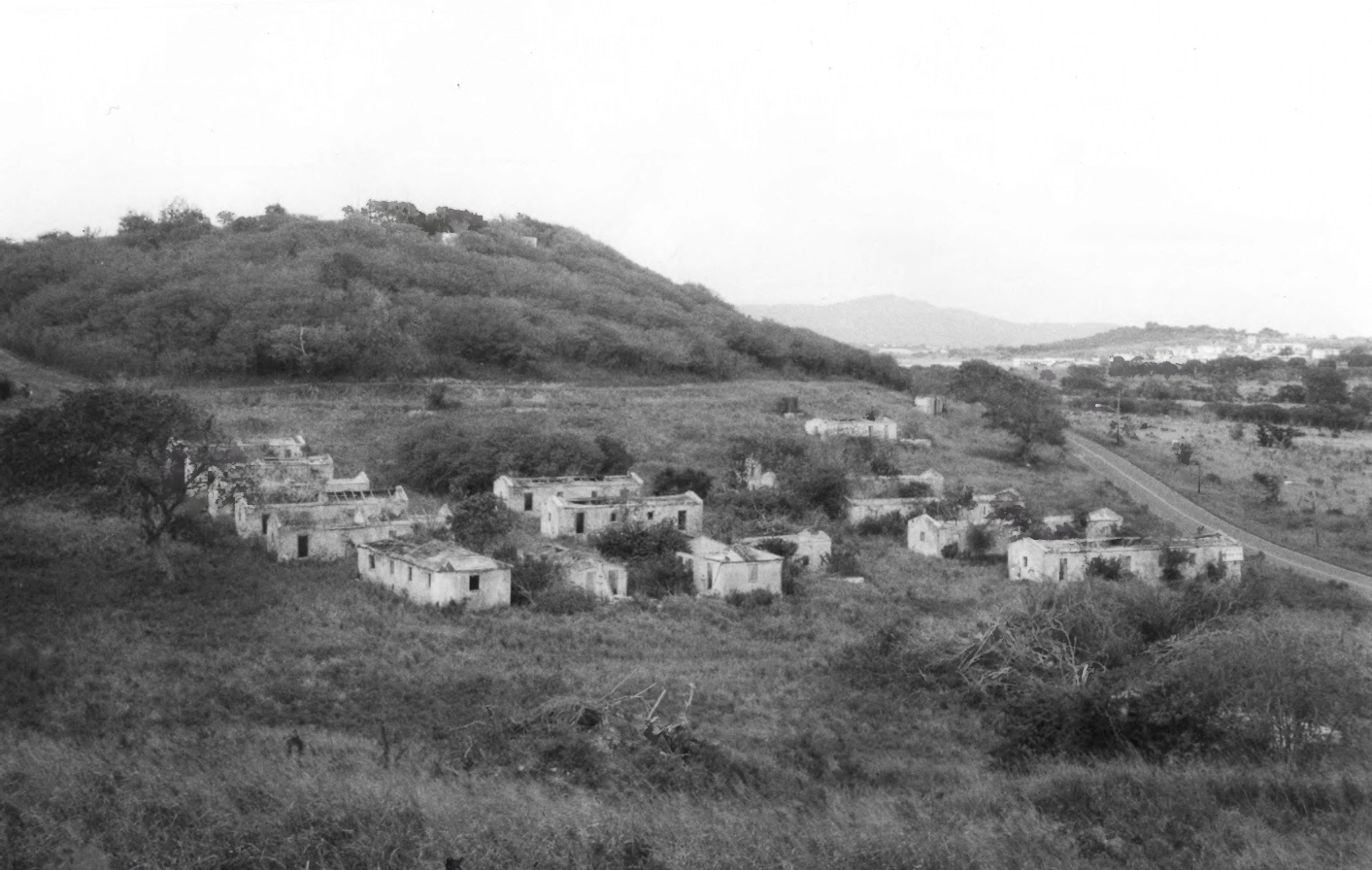
- workers' village in August 1983

- Location within the U.S. Virgin Islands
- Nearest city: Christiansted, Virgin Islands
- Coordinates: 17.717639°N 64.7925°W
- Area: 34 acres (14 ha)
- NRHP reference No.: 87001932
- Added to NRHP: July 6, 1988

The Bethlehem Middle Works Historic District, in King's Quarter, in Southcentral, in Saint Croix, U.S. Virgin Islands, was listed on the National Register of Historic Places in 1988. It is also known as Estate Bethlehem Middle Works and as Bethlehem Middle Works. It is a 34 acres (14 ha) historic district which included 26 contributing buildings, two contributing structures, and four contributing sites.

It was the works of a sugar plantation, and it includes remains of an overseer's house (c.1820), a windmill, an animal mill site, a steam factory site, site of an original slave village, later workers' quarters, a raised cistern, an animal pen, stables, and a greathouse.
