= Bethlehem, Connecticut =

- Town
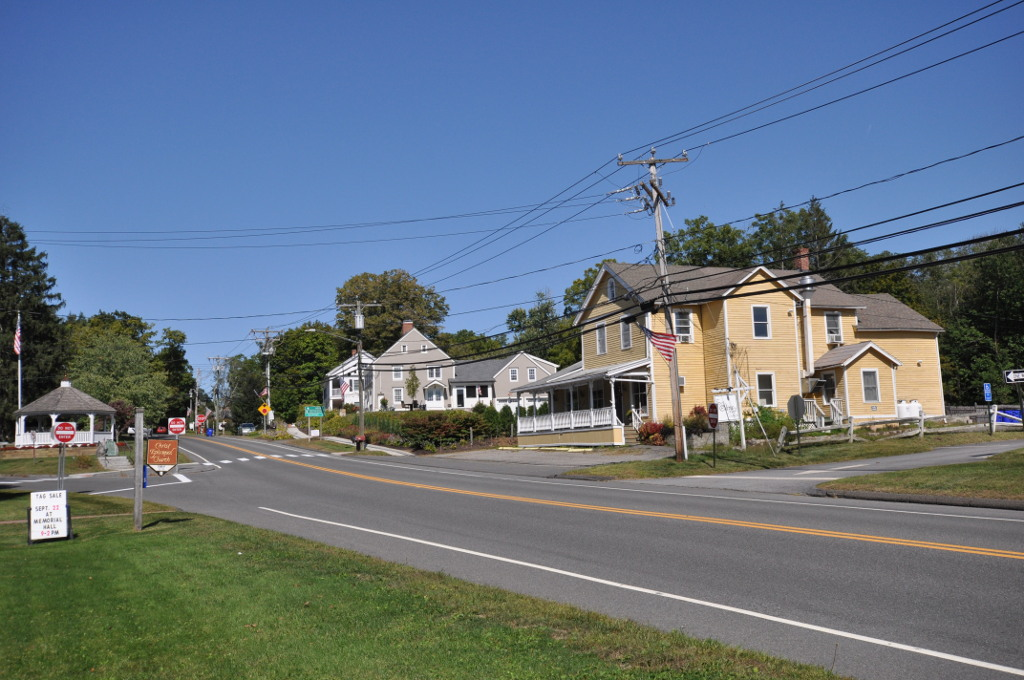
- Main Street South, Bethlehem Green Historic District

- Seal

- Interactive map of Bethlehem, Connecticut
- Coordinates: 41°38′21″N 73°12′31″W
- Country: United States
- U.S. state: Connecticut
- County: Litchfield
- Region: Naugatuck Valley
- Incorporated: 1787

Government
  - Type: Selectman-town meeting
  - First selectman: Stephen F. Sordi (R)
  - Selectman: George J. Rehkamp (R)
  - Selectman: Raymond Butkus (D)

Area
  - Total: 19.7 sq mi (50.9 km^{2})
  - Land: 19.4 sq mi (50.2 km^{2})
  - Water: 0.27 sq mi (0.7 km^{2})
- Elevation: 860 ft (262 m)

Population (2020)
  - Total: 3,385
  - Density: 190/sq mi (72/km^{2})
- Time zone: UTC-5 (Eastern)
  - Summer (DST): UTC-4 (Eastern)
- ZIP code: 06751
- Area codes: 203/475
- FIPS code: 09-04930
- GNIS feature ID: 0213391
- Website: www.bethlehemct.org

Bethlehem is a town in Litchfield County, Connecticut, United States. The population was 3,385 at the 2020 census, down from 3,607 at the 2010 census. The town is part of the Naugatuck Valley Planning Region. The town center is a historic district and a census-designated place (CDP).

The town's name has prompted thousands of visitors each December to mail their Christmas cards at the renowned local post office, situated at 34 East Street, in order to get a "Bethlehem" postmark. The post office also has nearly 100 Christmas-related stamps for customers to decorate their envelopes during the holiday season.

Bethlehem is one of the two towns in Litchfield County served by the area code 203/area code 475 overlay. The other is the town of Woodbury.

== Education ==
- Since 1970, elementary education has been handled by Regional School District 14, including Bethlehem Elementary School.
- Nonnewaug High School in neighboring Woodbury is the primary regional high school.
- The Woodhall School is a private high school located in town.

== Geography ==
Bethlehem is in southern Litchfield County and is bordered by Morris to the north, Watertown to the east, Woodbury to the south, and Washington to the west. According to the United States Census Bureau, Bethlehem has a total area of 19.7 square miles (51 km^{2}), of which 19.4 square miles (50 km^{2}) are land and 0.3 square miles (0.8 km^{2}), or 1.45%, is water. The Bethlehem Village census-designated place (CDP) corresponding to the center portion of the town has a total area of 8.1 square miles (20.9 km^{2}), of which 7.8 square miles (20.2 km^{2}) are land and 0.3 square miles (0.7 km^{2}), or 3.30%, are water. The two largest water bodies in the town are Long Meadow Pond and the Bronson E. Lockwood Reservoir, both in the northern part of town.

Route 132 passes through the town center, leading north to Morris and Litchfield, and south to US 6 in Woodbury. Route 132 takes a winding route through the town, leading south to Woodbury and east into Watertown.

On the eastern side of town is a ridge called "the Devil's Backbone", one of more than 30 Connecticut places named after the devil.

=== Principal community ===
- Bethlehem Village

== Demographics ==
Historical population
Census	Pop.	Note	%±
1820	932		—
1860	815		—
1870	750		−8.0%
1880	655		−12.7%
1890	543		−17.1%
1900	576		6.1%
1910	550		−4.5%
1920	536		−2.5%
1930	644		20.1%
1940	715		11.0%
1950	1,015		42.0%
1960	1,486		46.4%
1970	1,923		29.4%
1980	2,573		33.8%
1990	3,071		19.4%
2000	3,422		11.4%
2010	3,607		5.4%
2020	3,385		−6.2%
U.S. Decennial Census

At the 2010 census Bethlehem had a population of 3,607. The racial composition of the population was 97.9% white, 0.4% black or African American, 0.1% Native American, 0.5% Asian, 0.2% from some other race and 0.9% from two or more races. 1.7% of the population were Hispanic or Latino of any race.

At the 2000 census, there were 3,422 people, 1,246 households and 935 families residing in the town. The population density was 176.8 inhabitants per square mile (68.3/km^{2}). There were 1,388 housing units at an average density of 71.7 per square mile (27.7/km^{2}). The racial makeup of the town was 97.49% White, 0.26% African American, 0.06% Native American, 0.79% Asian, 0.03% Pacific Islander, 0.38% from other races and 0.99% from two or more races. Hispanic or Latino of any race were 0.64% of the population.

There were 1,246 households, of which 35.2% had children under the age of 18 living with them, 65.7% were married couples living together, 6.6% had a female householder with no husband present, and 24.9% were non-families. 19.6% of all households were made up of individuals, and 7.8% had someone living alone who was 65 years of age or older. The average household size was 2.69 and the average family size was 3.11.

25.2% of the population were under the age of 18, 4.5% from 18 to 24, 26.6% from 25 to 44, 30.8% from 45 to 64, and 12.9% who were 65 years of age or older. The median age was 42 years. For every 100 females, there were 94.3 males. For every 100 females age 18 and over, there were 93.4 males.

The median household income was $68,542 and the median family income was $78,863. Males had a median income of $51,623 compared with $37,500 for females. The per capita income was $29,672. About 0.5% of families and 2.6% of the population were below the poverty line, including none of those under age 18 and 11.2% of those age 65 or over.

Voter registration and party enrollment as of October 29, 2019
Party	Active voters	Inactive voters	Total voters	Percentage
Republican	942	7	949	33.32%
Democratic	687	10	697	24.47%
Unaffiliated	1,143	6	1,149	40.34%
Minor Parties	51	2	53	1.86%
Total	2,823	25	2,848	100%

Presidential Election Results
Year	Democratic	Republican	Third Parties
2020	39.6% 937	58.9% 1,393	1.5% 37
2016	34.7% 801	60.7% 1,405	4.6% 106
2012	41.0% 894	58.3% 1,272	0.7% 16
2008	45.2% 1,027	53.3% 1,214	1.5% 34
2004	40.0% 922	57.8% 1,337	2.2% 52
2000	40.2% 817	52.3% 1,064	7.5% 153
1996	37.1% 711	45.1% 867	17.8% 342
1992	30.7% 620	40.5% 822	28.8% 585
1988	36.9% 643	61.7% 1,078	1.4% 26
1984	31.2% 467	68.6% 1,026	0.2% 3
1980	31.0% 452	56.0% 816	13.0% 189
1976	41.8% 542	57.9% 755	0.3% 5
1972	34.9% 408	64.5% 755	0.6% 8
1968	40.2% 377	53.4% 502	6.4% 60
1964	61.6% 507	39.4% 330	0.00% 0
1960	34.0% 282	66.0% 548	0.00% 0
1956	22.5% 159	77.5% 548	0.00% 0

== Transportation ==
Route 61 is the main north-south road while Route 132 is the main east-west road through the town. There is no access to public transportation. The nearest rail station (Metro North) is Waterbury, CT. The nearest passenger commercial airports are Tweed New Haven Airport (40 miles) and Bradley International Airport (50 miles).

== Local media ==
- Waterbury Republican-American, an independent daily newspaper
- Voices, a local newspaper serving Southbury, Middlebury, Oxford, Seymour, Naugatuck, Woodbury, Bethelhem, New Preston, Washington, Washington Depot, Roxbury, Bridgewater, Monroe, Sandy Hook and Newtown

== Points of interest ==
- Bellamy-Ferriday House and Garden, built in 1760 and added to the National Register of Historic Places in 1982.
- The Bethlehem Green Historic District contains 63 properties and was listed on the National Register of Historic Places in 1982.
- Old Bethlehem Historical Society Museum
- Christ Episcopal Church (Bethlehem, Connecticut)

=== Abbey of Regina Laudis ===
The town is home to the Benedictine Abbey of Regina Laudis, founded in 1947, one of the first houses of contemplative Benedictine nuns in the United States. Robert Leather, a Protestant industrialist, donated 400 acres (1.6 km^{2}) of land on which the convent is located. The convent now has 37 nuns.

The abbey is known for its commitment to the arts, especially the performance of Gregorian chant. The acting background of Mother Dolores Hart, O.S.B., has prompted the convent to sponsor annual summer theatre productions.

Hart has worked with fellow artists, including James and Dawn Douglas, to found the Act Association, a group that performs at The Gary-The Olivia Theater, an open-air venue which seats about 200 people. Built in 1982 with the help of actress Patricia Neal, this open-air theater seats about 200 people. Productions have included plays by Shakespeare, Sartre, opera and musical reviews. Patricia Neal and James Douglas appeared in She Stoops to Conquer in 1999.

== Events ==
- Bethlehem Fair is held the weekend after Labor Day in September on the picturesque fairgrounds located at 384 Main Street North.
- Connecticut Garlic and Harvest Festival is held in October at the town fairgrounds.
- Christmas Town Festival is held the first weekend of December on the town green.

== Notable people ==
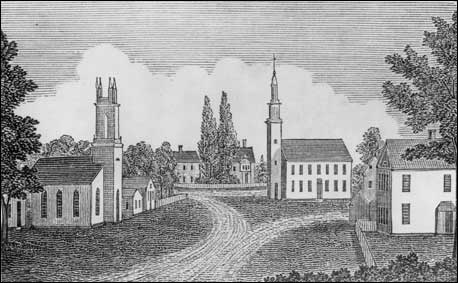
View of the center of Bethlehem by John Warner Barber (published 1836), said to be the earliest depiction of the town

- Christine Baranski, actress, and her husband, the actor and playwright Matthew Cowles
- Joseph Bellamy (1719–1790), influential Congregationalist theologian in the 18th century, was pastor at the Congregational church in town for 50 years, until his death
- Jess Davis, U.S. Olympian, modern pentathlon
- James Douglas, died there in 2016
- Dolores Hart, former actress who appeared with Elvis Presley, became a Roman Catholic nun at the Benedictine Abbey of Regina Laudis in town, ultimately becoming head (or "prioress") of the convent. Her formal title now is the Reverend Mother Dolores Hart
- David Leavitt (1791–1879), New York City banker, financier and art collector, born at Bethlehem to the Connecticut legislator and businessman David Leavitt Sr.
- Noella Marcellino, Benedictine nun who earned a doctorate in microbiology from the University of Connecticut and became a Roman Catholic nun at the Benedictine Abbey of Regina Laudis in town. She won a Fulbright scholarship to France to collect and examine native strains of fungi from traditional cheese caves, with an emphasis on Geotrichum candidum, and stayed an additional three years on a grant from the French government in order to analyze the samples
- Dani Shapiro Author and podcaster.
