= 1852 United States presidential election in Connecticut =

- November 2, 1852

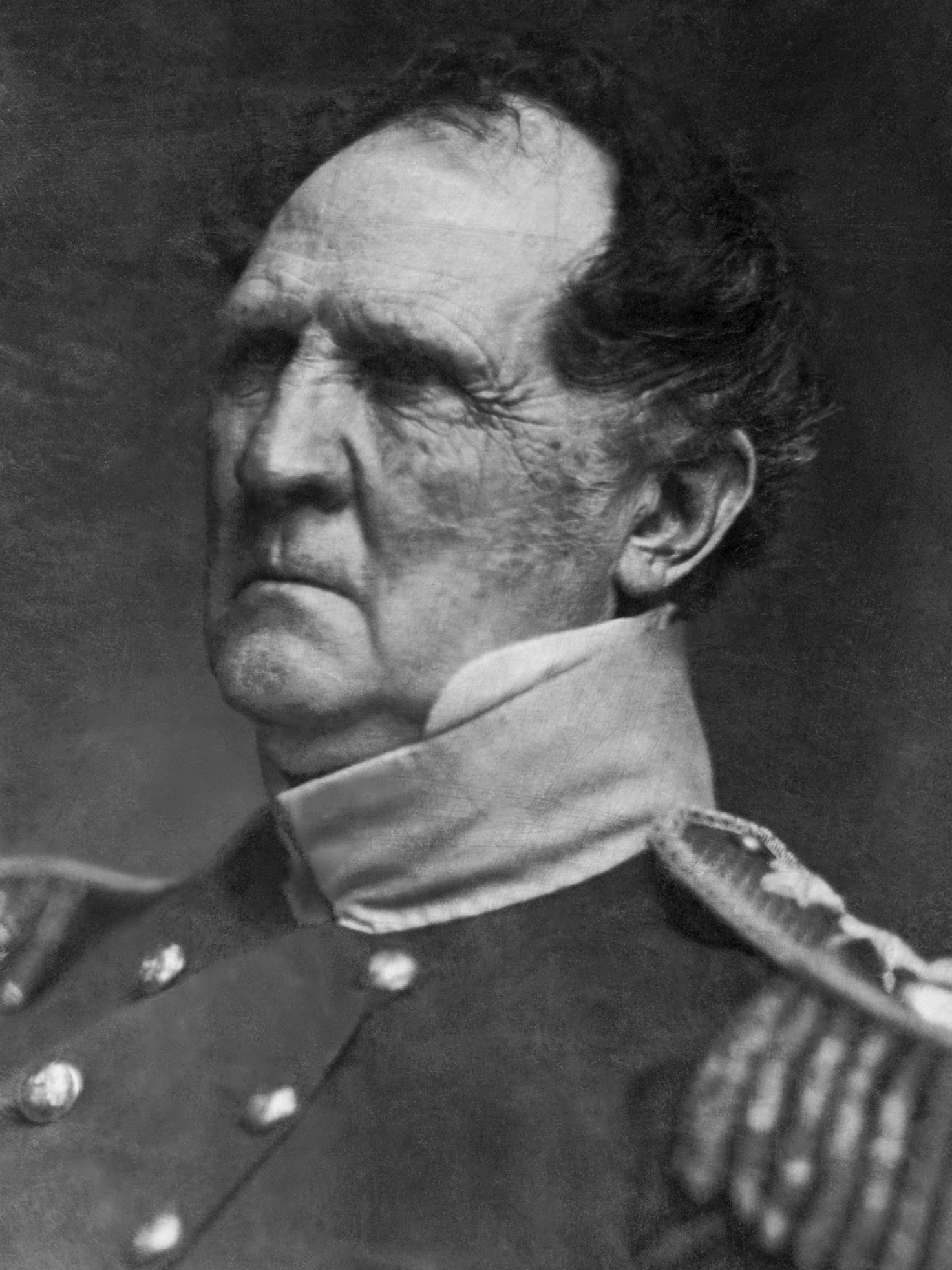
Nominee	Franklin Pierce	Winfield Scott
Party	Democratic	Whig
Home state	New Hampshire	New Jersey
Running mate	William R. King	William Alexander Graham
Electoral vote	6	0
Popular vote	33,249	30,359
Percentage	49.79%	45.46%

Pierce
40–50%
50–60%
60–70%
70–80%
Scott
50–60%
60–70%
70–80%
Tie
50%
President before election
Millard Fillmore
Whig
Elected President
Franklin Pierce
Democratic

The 1852 United States presidential election in Connecticut took place on November 2, 1852, as part of the 1852 United States presidential election. Voters chose six representatives, or electors to the Electoral College, who voted for President and Vice President.

Connecticut voted for the Democratic candidate, Franklin Pierce, over the Whig Party candidate, Winfield Scott. Pierce won the state by a narrow margin of 4.33%.

A Democratic presidential nominee would not win Connecticut again until Samuel J. Tilden narrowly won it in 1876. Pierce would also be the last Democrat until Lyndon B. Johnson in 1964 to sweep all of Connecticut's counties.

== Results ==
1852 United States presidential election in Connecticut
Party	Candidate	Running mate	Popular vote		Electoral vote	
Party	Candidate	Running mate	Count	%	Count	%
Democratic	Franklin Pierce of New Hampshire	William R. King of Alabama	33,249	49.79%	6	100.00%
Whig	Winfield Scott of New Jersey	William Alexander Graham of North Carolina	30,359	45.46%	0	0.00%
Free Soil	John P. Hale of New Hampshire	George W. Julian of Indiana	3,161	4.73%	0	0.00%
N/A	Others	Others	12	0.02%	0	0.00%
Total			66,781	100.00%	6	100.00%

== See also ==
- United States presidential elections in Connecticut
