= 1892 United States presidential election in Connecticut =

- November 8, 1892

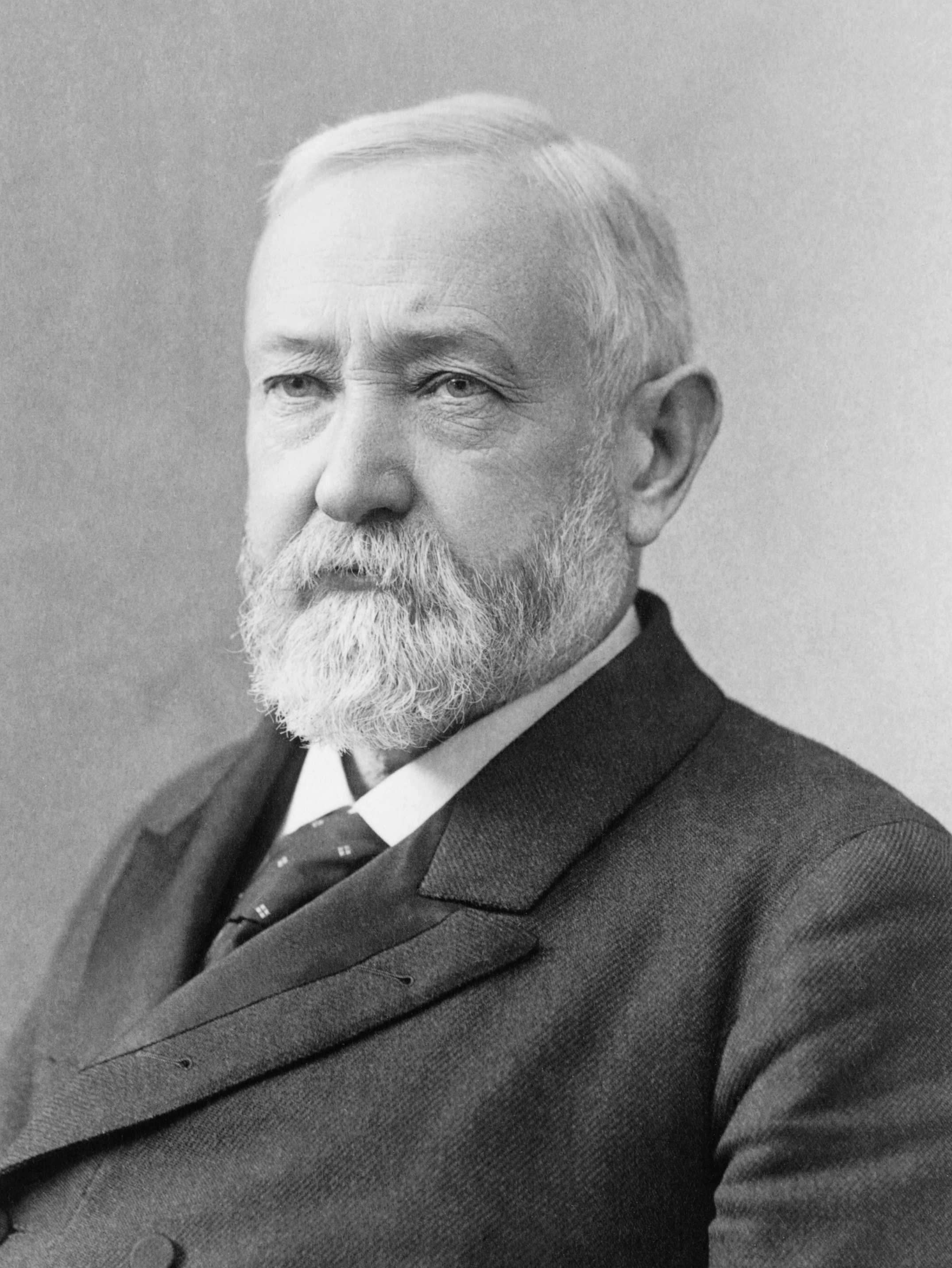
Nominee	Grover Cleveland	Benjamin Harrison
Party	Democratic	Republican
Home state	New York	Indiana
Running mate	Adlai Stevenson I	Whitelaw Reid
Electoral vote	6	0
Popular vote	82,395	77,032
Percentage	50.06%	46.80%

Cleveland
40–50%
50–60%
60–70%
70–80%
Harrison
40–50%
50–60%
60–70%
President before election
Benjamin Harrison
Republican
Elected President
Grover Cleveland
Democratic

The 1892 United States presidential election in Connecticut took place on November 8, 1892, as part of the 1892 United States presidential election. Voters chose six representatives, or electors to the Electoral College, who voted for president and vice president.

Connecticut voted for the Democratic nominee, former President Grover Cleveland, who was running for a second, non-consecutive term over incumbent President Republican Benjamin Harrison. Cleveland won the state by a narrow margin of 3.26%.

== Results ==
1892 United States presidential election in Connecticut
Party	Candidate	Running mate	Popular vote		Electoral vote	
Party	Candidate	Running mate	Count	%	Count	%
Democratic	Grover Cleveland of New York	Adlai Ewing Stevenson I of Illinois	82,395	50.06%	6	100.00%
Republican	Benjamin Harrison of Indiana (incumbent)	Whitelaw Reid of New York	77,032	46.80%	0	0.00%
Prohibition	John Bidwell of California	James Britton Cranfill of Texas	4,026	2.45%	0	0.00%
Populist	James Baird Weaver of Iowa	James Gaven Field of Virginia	809	0.49%	0	0.00%
Socialist Labor	Simon Wing of Massachusetts	Charles Horatio Matchett of New York	333	0.20%	0	0.00%
Total			164,595	100.00%	6	100.00%

== See also ==
- United States presidential elections in Connecticut
