= Kent station =

Kent station may refer to:

- Kent station (OC Transpo), a bus stop in Ottawa, Ontario, Canada
- Cork Kent railway station, a station of the Iarnród Éireann (Irish Rail) in Cork, Ireland
- Kent station (Sound Transit), a station of Sounder commuter rail in Kent, Washington, U.S.
- Kent station (Connecticut), former train station on the Housatonic Railroad
- Kent station (Erie Railroad), former Erie station in Kent, Ohio, U.S.
