= Merwinsville Hotel =

- U.S. National Register of Historic Places
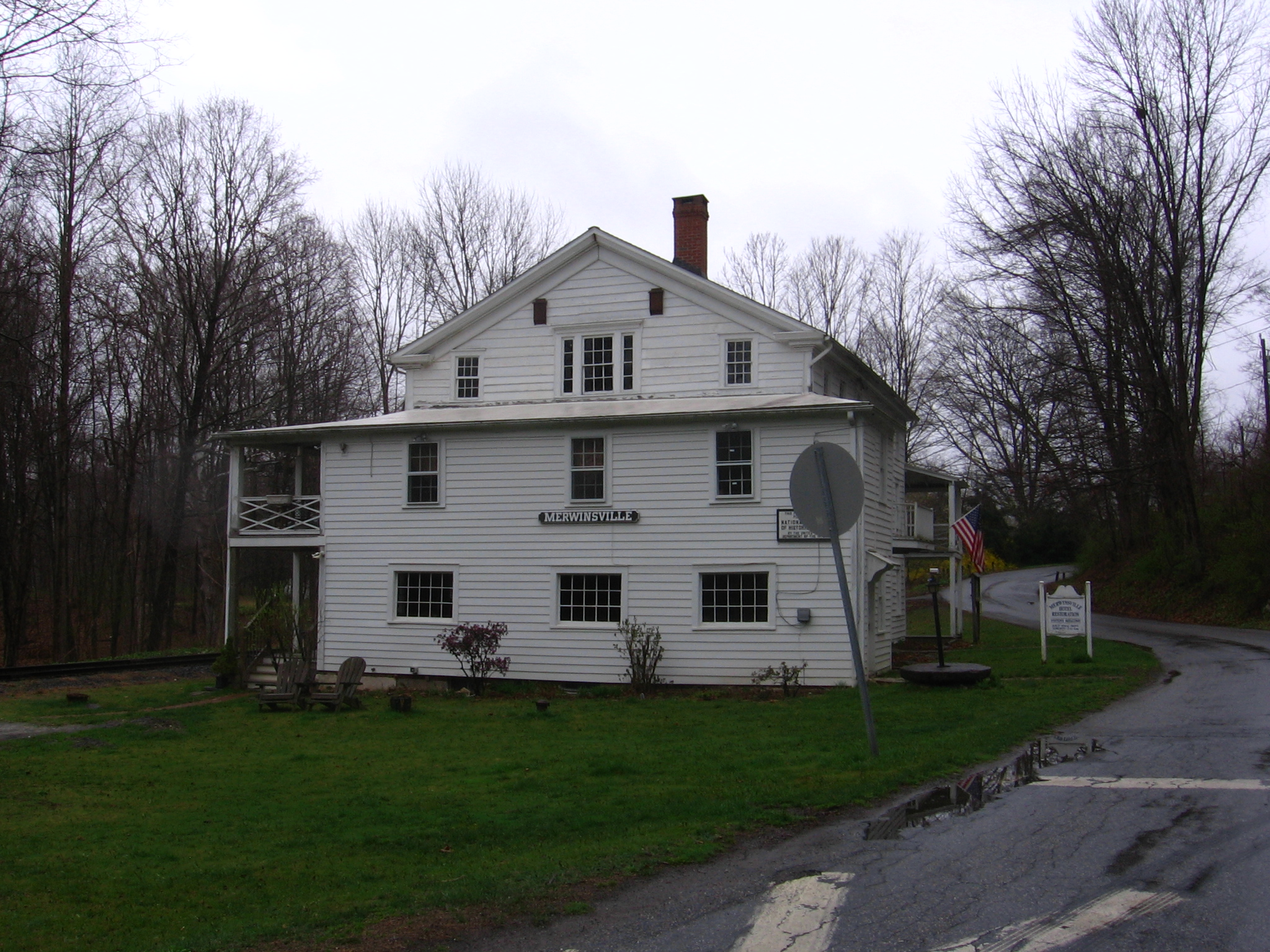

- Location within Connecticut Location within the United States
- Location: 1 Brown's Forge Road, New Milford, Connecticut
- Coordinates: 41°38′49″N 73°28′44″W
- Area: 0.5 acres (0.20 ha)
- Built: 1842
- Architectural style: Greek Revival, Vernacular Greek Revival
- NRHP reference No.: 77001398
- Added to NRHP: August 29, 1977

The Merwinsville Hotel is a historic hotel building and former railroad station at 1 Brown's Forge Road in the Gaylordsville village of New Milford, Connecticut. Built in 1842-43, it is one of the oldest hotels built specifically for a railroad stop in the United States. It was listed on the National Register of Historic Places in 1977.

== Description and history ==
The Merwinsville Hotel is located in far Northwestern New Milford, on the East Side of the Village of Gaylordville. It is set at the Northwest Corner of Brown's Forge Road and Station Road, and immediately East of the Railroad Tracks of the Housatonic Railroad. It is a three-story wood frame structure, with a gabled roof and clapboarded exterior. Its main block is flanked by a two-story wing with shed roof on the South Side. The track-facing facade has a two-story porch with latticework railing, wrapping around to the building's north side. There are street-facing entrances near the center of the main block, and at the end of the ell.

The hotel was the inspired idea of a local entrepreneur, Sylvanus Merwin. Upon learning in 1842 that the Housatonic Railroad would be routed through the area, he purchased up parcels of land that required it to cross land he controlled. He then negotiated with the railroad executives for the placement of the hotel, requiring that the train stop there for a meal, and that the station be named "Merwinville". The hotel was open for service in 1843, when the train service was inaugurated. Merwin then also became the station agent. The stipulations of the agreement remained in place until 1877, when faster trains and onboard meal service led to the elimination of the meal contract. In 1915, the railroad also terminated the station contract, building a new station to the south, and renaming the stop "Gaylordville". The hotel was purchased by a local family and used as a private residence into the 1940s. It then stood vacant and neglected until the 1970s, when a non-profit was established to restore the building. It is believed to be one of the nation's oldest purpose-built railroad hotels.

== See also ==
- National Register of Historic Places listings in Litchfield County, Connecticut
