= Gaylordsville station =

Former train station in Connecticut, U.S.

Gaylordsville
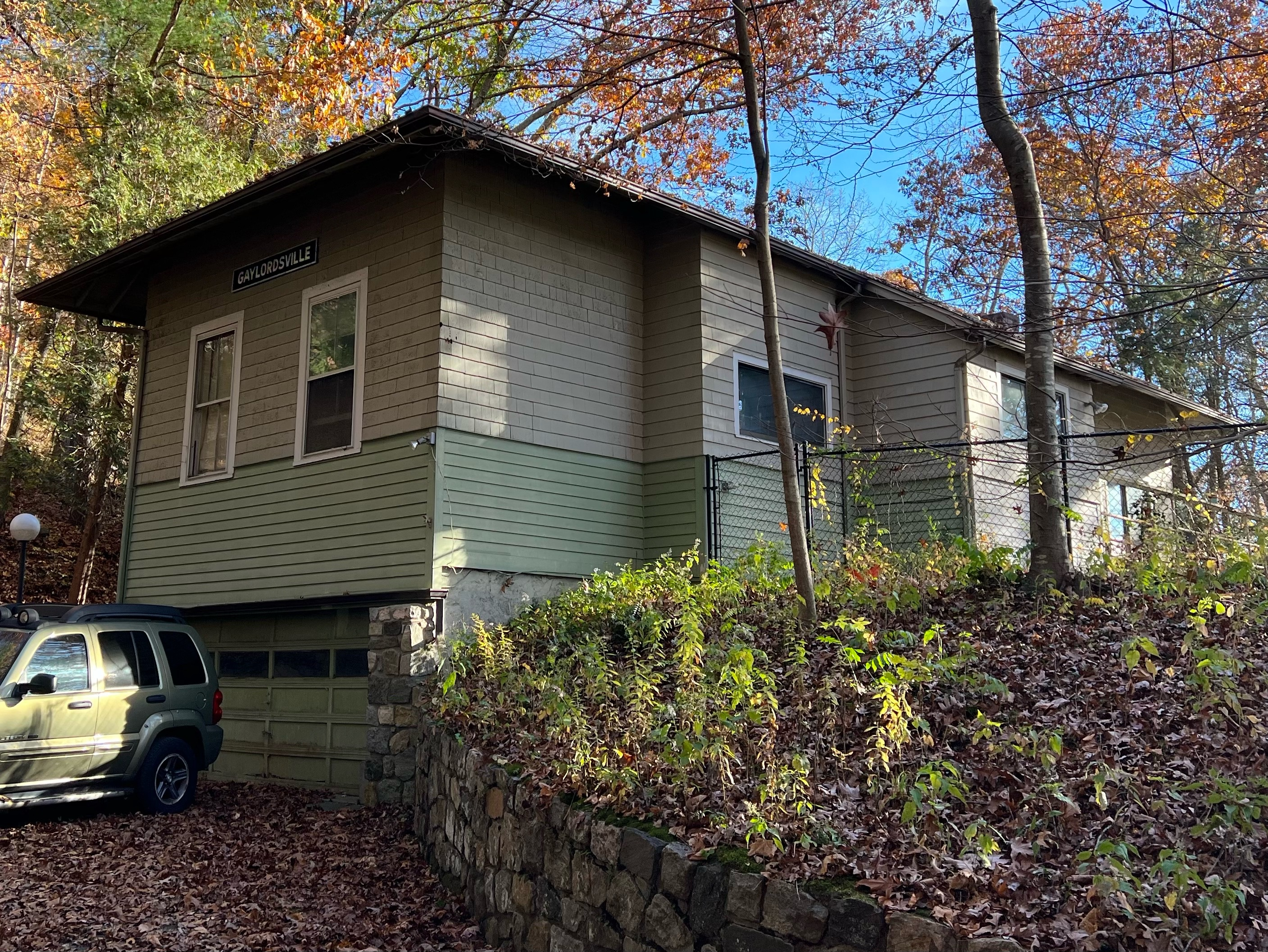
- The relocated & converted Gaylordsville Station (2022)

General information
- Coordinates: 41.64703°N 73.47603°W
- Line: Housatonic Railroad
- Tracks: 1

History
- Opened: 1918; 108 years ago
- Closed: 1970; 56 years ago

Former services
Preceding station	New York, New Haven and Hartford Railroad	Following station
New Milford toward Norwalk and South Norwalk	Pittsfield Branch	Kent toward Pittsfield
Location

Gaylordsville station is a former train station in Gaylordsville, Connecticut. The station building was built in the 1918, replacing the Merwinsville Hotel as the local depot, to serve passengers on the Housatonic Railroad. Shortly after its closure, the station was purchased by former New York advertising executives, Jean & Cle Kinney. In October 1971, the couple relocated the structure to a nearby hill on River Road and converted it into their own unique and creative home.

== Merwinsville Hotel ==
Prior to the construction of the combination passenger station and freight house that would become Gaylordsville Station, the Merwinsville Hotel was the railroad station and "meal stop" serving the area. The unconventional depot was in operation as such from 1843 until 1918.

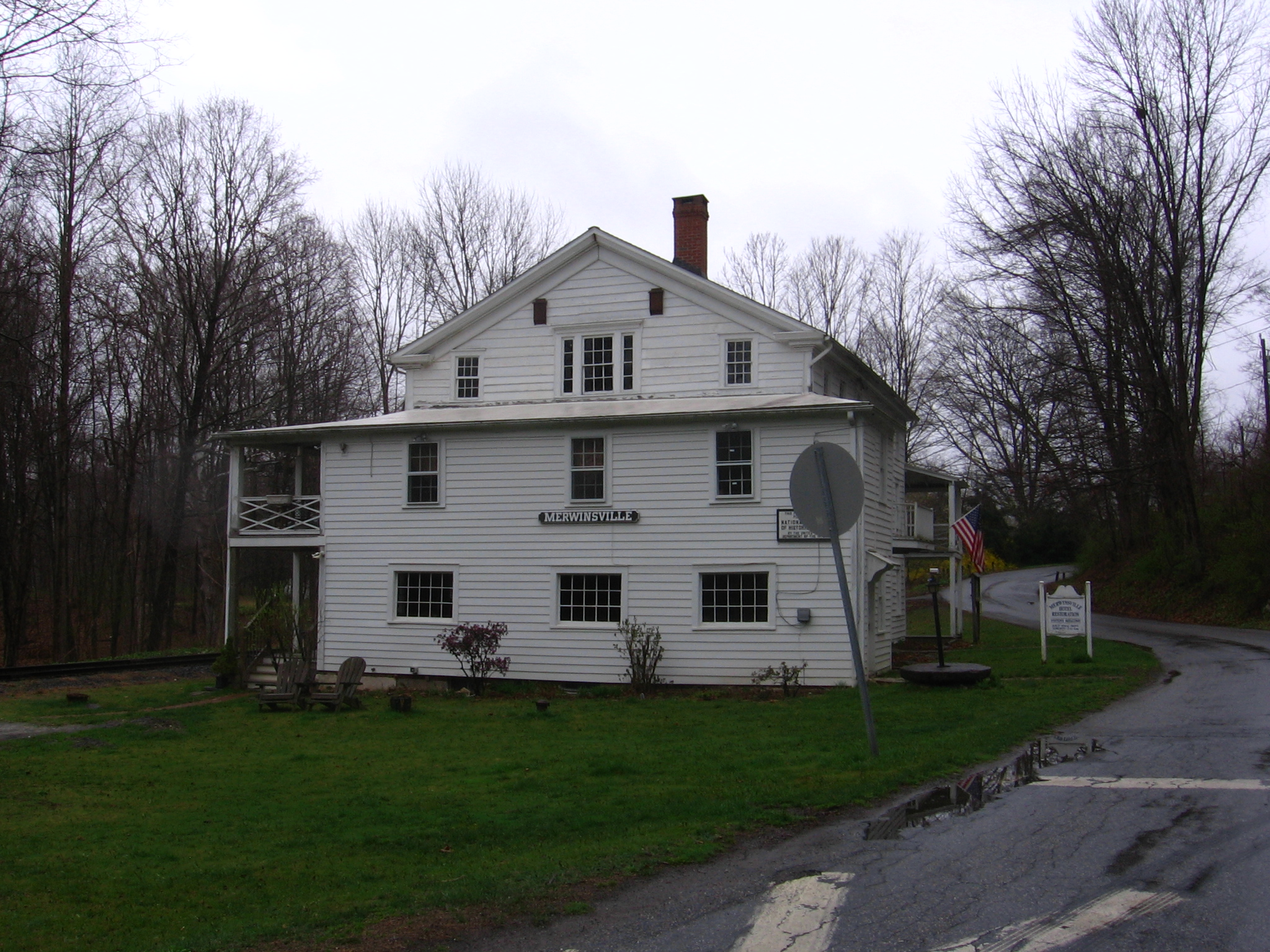
