= Kent station (Connecticut) =

Former train station in Connecticut, U.S.

Kent
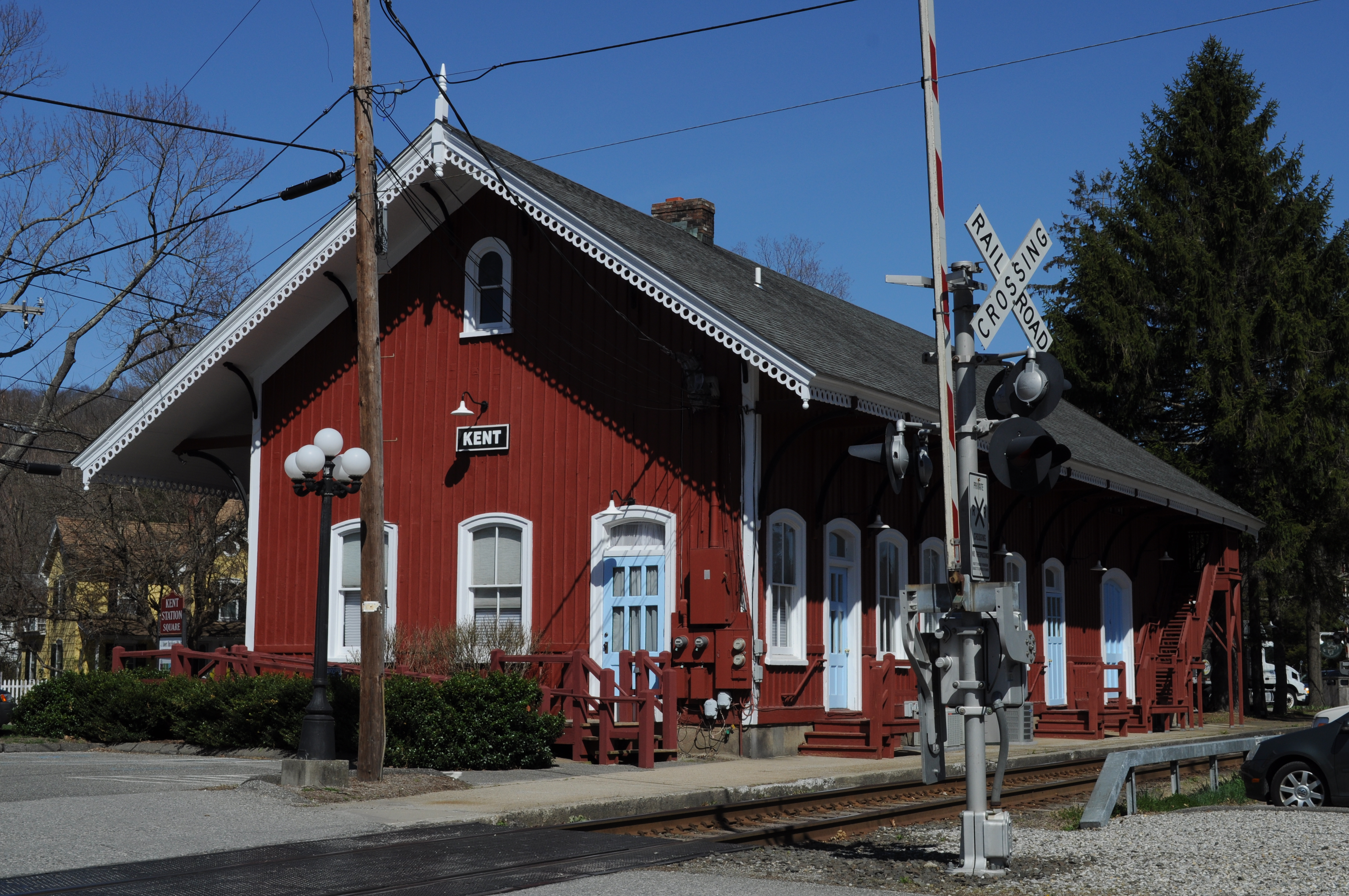
- The former Kent station in 2012

General information
- Coordinates: 41.7268771°N 73.4749836°W
- Line: Housatonic Railroad
- Tracks: 1

History
- Opened: 1874; 152 years ago
- Closed: 1974; 52 years ago

Former services
Preceding station	New York, New Haven and Hartford Railroad	Following station
Gaylordsville toward Norwalk and South Norwalk	Pittsfield Branch	Cornwall Bridge toward Pittsfield
Location

Kent station is a former train station in Kent, Connecticut. The station building was built in the 1870s to serve passengers on the Housatonic Railroad. The depot was anticipated to be completed and operating by August 1, 1872. However, by April 1873 only the foundation and a portion of the framework was completed. Once completed, the depot was described as "one of the finest" on the Housatonic RR.

The structure still stands today and operates as Kent Station Pharmacy.

== Gallery ==
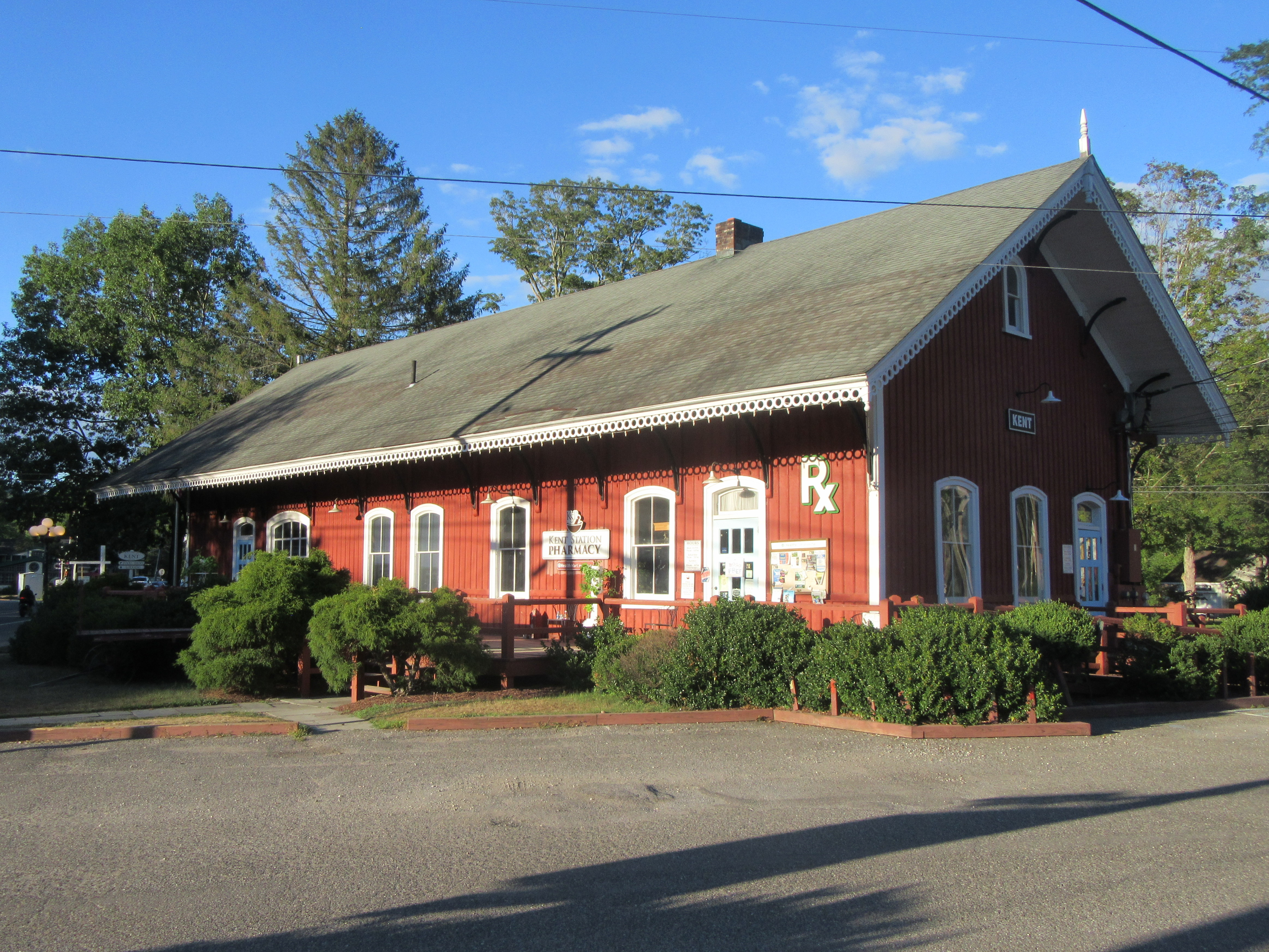
Kent Station Pharmacy

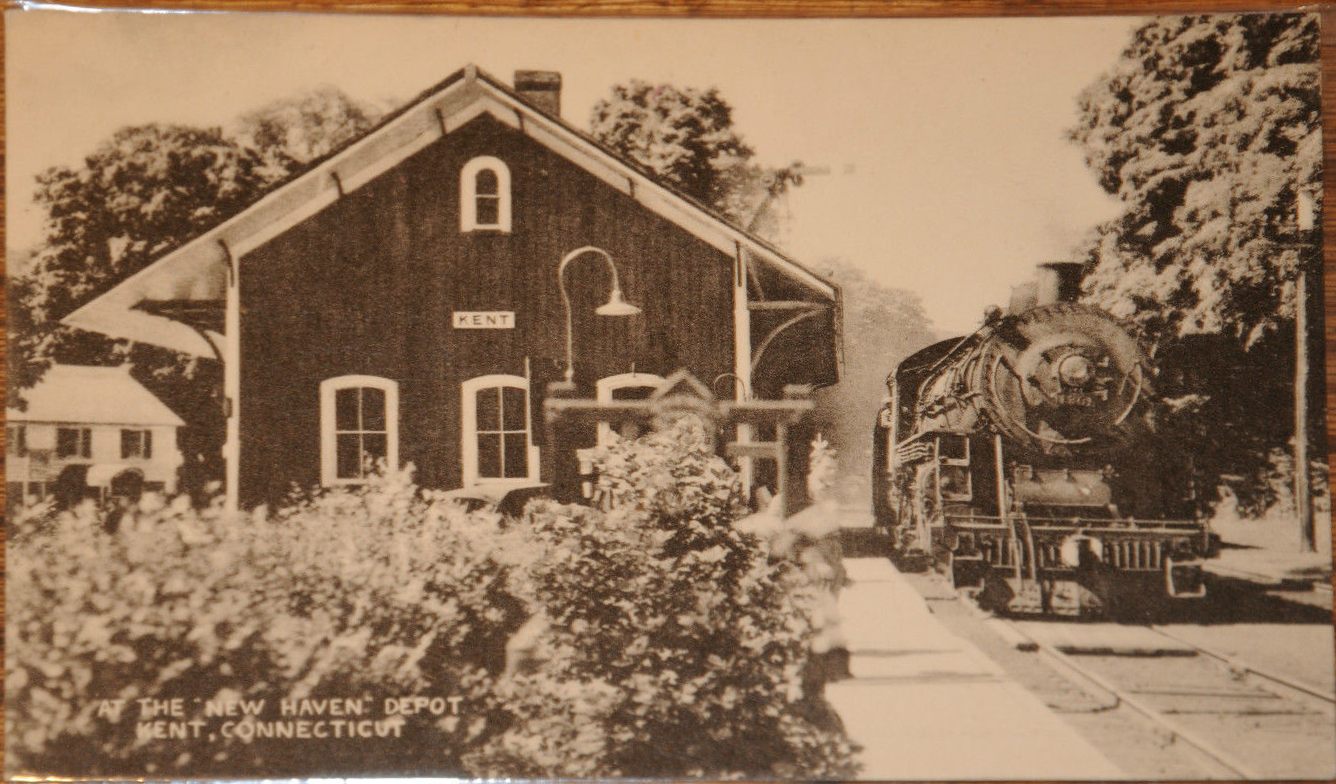
Early 20th postcard of Kent station

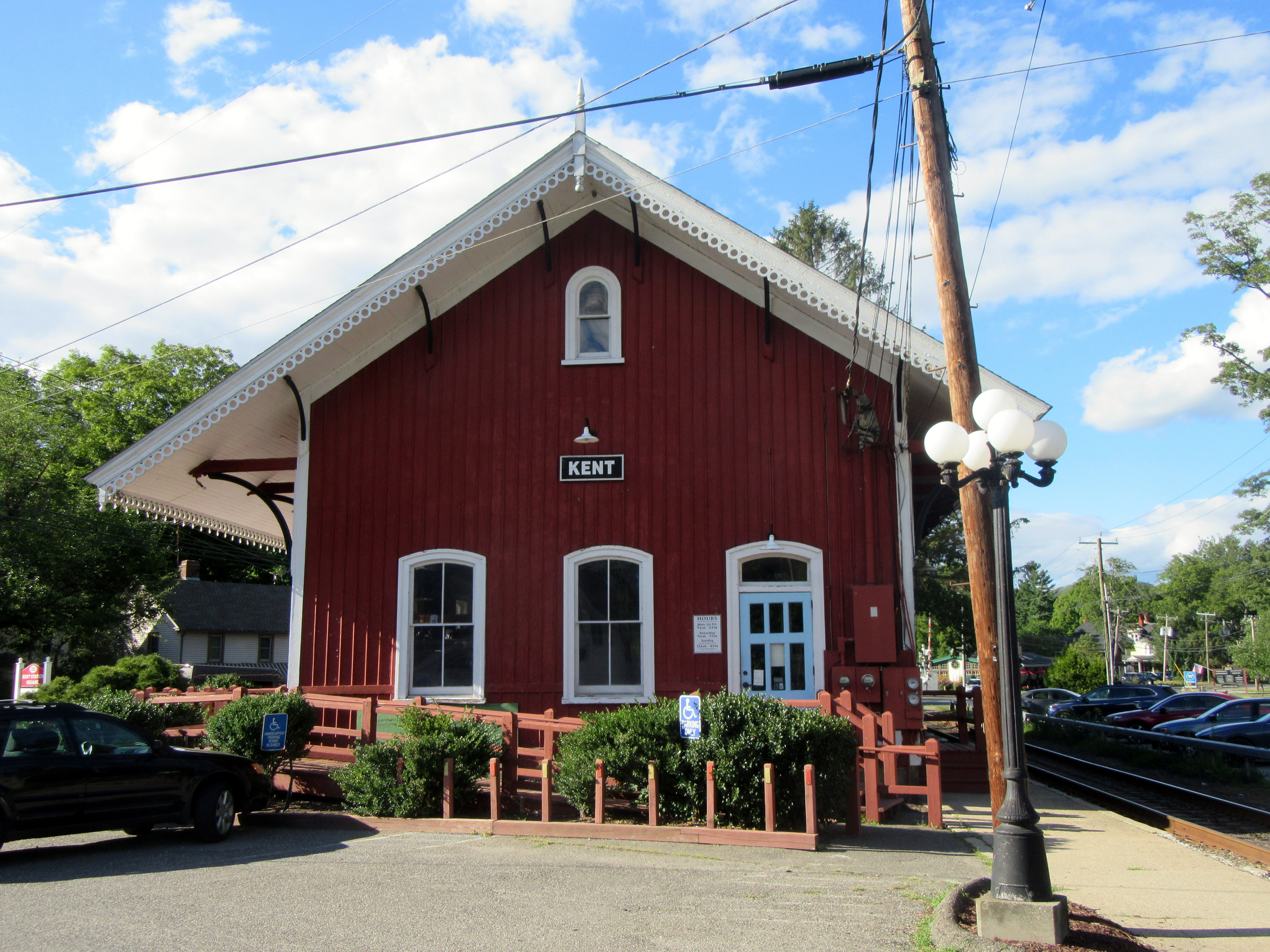
Front view of Kent station
