= Bull's Bridge =

United States historic place

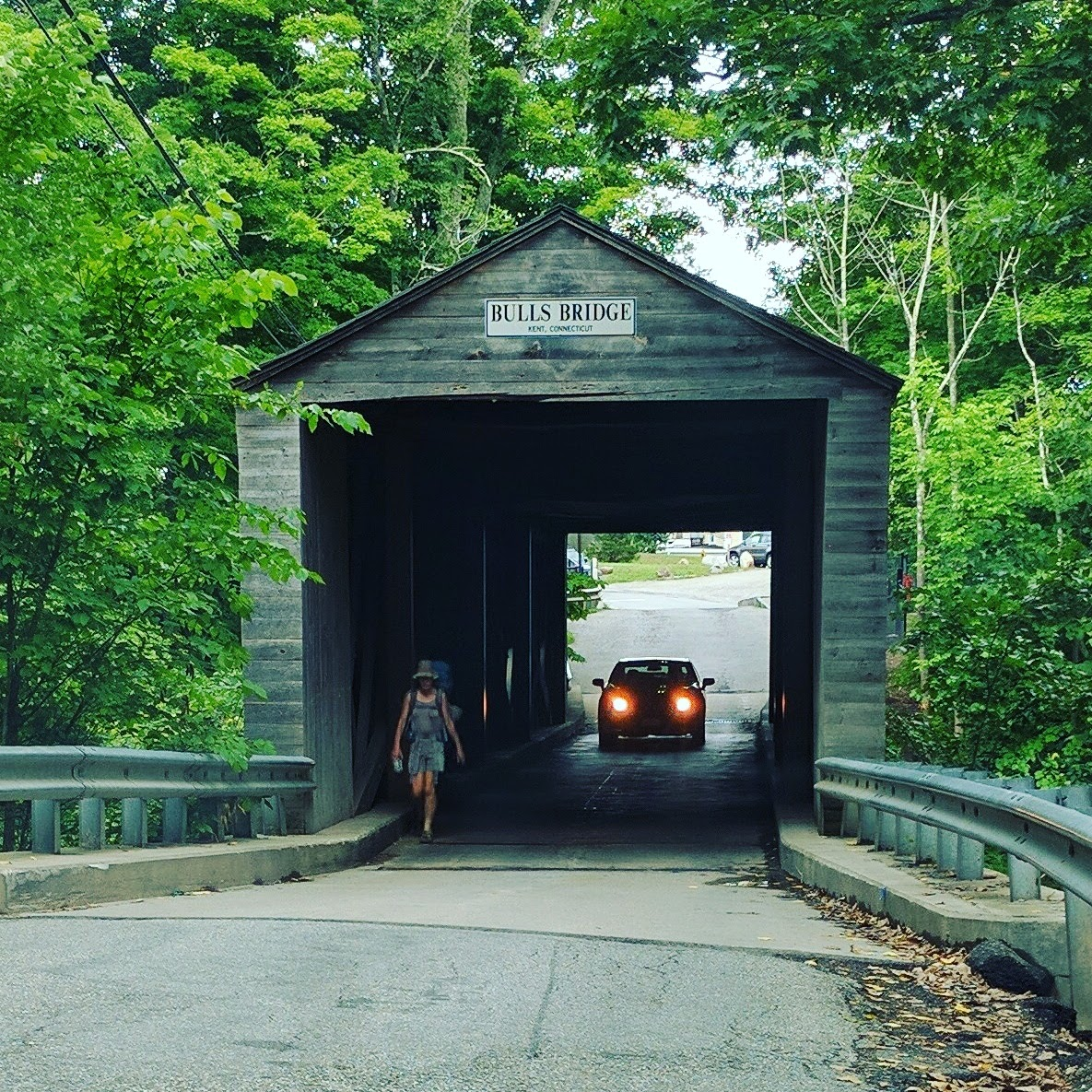
- Traffic on Bull's Bridge crossing the Housatonic River
- Coordinates: 41°40′32″N 73°30′34″W
- Carries: Bull's Bridge Road
- Crosses: Housatonic River
- Locale: Kent, Connecticut
- Official name: Bridge No. 4453
- Maintained by: Connecticut Department of Transportation

Characteristics
- Design: Lattice truss bridge
- Material: Wood
- Total length: 33.2 metres (109 ft)

History
- Opened: 1842

Statistics
- Toll: None

Location
- Interactive map of Bull's Bridge

Bull's Bridge is a single-lane vehicular wooden covered bridge across the Housatonic River in the town of Kent, Connecticut, close to the state border with New York. The first instance of a bridge at this location was constructed by Jacob and Isaac Bull in 1760, which gave the bridge its name. Popular legend suggests that George Washington crossed the bridge with the Bulls' assistance while still under construction. The current bridge was built in 1842 from timber, with additional supports added in the 19th and 20th centuries. Built with a Town lattice design, the bridge has reinforced trusswork visible on the interior. At the time of its nomination to the National Register of Historic Places the roof had wood shingles. It is historically significant as one of three surviving covered bridges in Connecticut, and was listed on the National Register of Historic Places in 1972.

== Location ==
The bridge is 109 feet (33 m) long and crosses the Housatonic River in the northwest corner of the state, half a mile from the border with New York State. The main highway, Connecticut Route 7 is close to the bridge and runs parallel with the river along western Connecticut. Unlike the majority of the state, the area is predominantly woodland and popular for hiking and watersports. It is downstream from a hydroelectric dam outlet to the river, and the prominence of waterfalls and rapids makes it a popular tourist route.

The bridge is one of only three existing public highway covered bridges remaining in Connecticut and one of two currently in service for motor vehicles. Automobile traffic is restricted to one lane, which has presented a problem for pedestrians attempting to cross it. Despite its rarity, it has survived due to its ability to handle heavy loads and its sound construction. The presence of a cover helps solve the problem of the wooden bridge floor gradually deteriorating due to the weather, while its high crossing point above the river means it is less susceptible to erosion by spring freshets.

== History ==
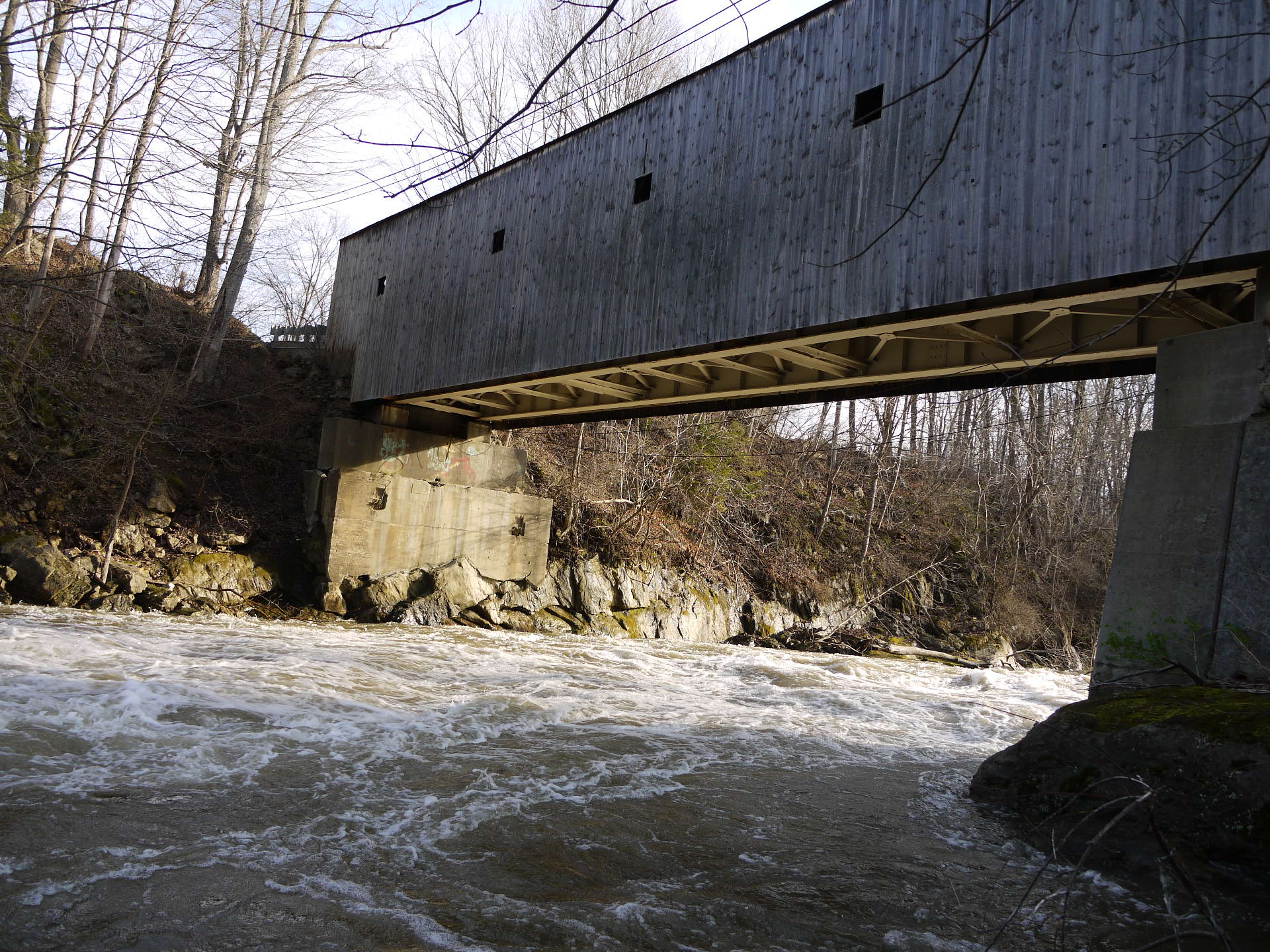
The bridge sits at a high point above the Housatonic River, which makes it less prone to damage from freshets.

There has been a crossing of the Housatonic River in this location since the 18th century. The first recorded instance of a bridge was in 1760 by Jacob Bull and his son, Isaac. It was originally used to transport pig iron from Bull's foundry to Poughkeepsie, New York and constructed from timber and hardware produced by Bull's sawmill and furnace. Bull chose the location because it was the narrowest point of the river in the area. According to Peter C. Vermilyea, author of Hidden History of Litchfield County, instead states it was built to transport iron ore during the American Revolutionary War. While account conflicts with the earlier 1760 construction and use, it was likely the date is accurate of another construction. Vermilyea cites that the average lifespan of these bridges were seven to ten years, so it is not known for certain if it was a reconstruction. Vermilyea states that it was built to transport iron ore from Newburgh, New York to Hartford, Connecticut. Other constructions were likely to have continued, historian Shelley Wong writes, "The [current] bridge was one of several built across the gorge over the years as flooding and ice took their toll."

A local report suggested the bridge also served as a point of refuge, particularly for Connecticut's Blue Law offenders, where once on the left bank of the river, they could easily cross to the New York border. State authorities would not go through the extradition process, leaving them safe.

The founding father William Samuel Johnson built a replacement bridge to connect his "Iron Works" with the farm of his brother-in-law Able Beach; though Johnson took controlling interest of the mine in 1765, his bridge was probably built around 1773, after he returned from his five-year stint as Colonial Agent in London. Able Beach died during the war, leaving his widow Mary to run the farm with only her children. According to a family legend, the road across the farm became an important highway once New York City was occupied by the British, so that Continental Army officers began to stop at “Madam Beach’s”, as her great barns gave "good shelter to the men", and officers were "sure of entertainment in the farm house”: the widow hosted General Washington on several visits, and he was said to have a high regard for the patriotic widow. This regard was shared by William Samuel Johnson, who at age 74 in 1801, rode up to Kent and married the widow.

The present bridge dates from 1842. (Note: Some sources give an alternative date for the current bridge. The National Register of Historic Places nomination from 1972 states that the original construction date was unknown and that it could date from the 1870s. Brenda Krekeler's Covered Bridges Today instead says that the Bull's Bridge was built in 1858 by Jacob Bull of Dover Plains, New York for $3,000, equivalent to $112,000 in 2025. Krekeler's claim cites Richard Allen Sanders' 1950 article "Covered Bridges in Connecticut" from The Antiquarian as its source for the information.) The bridge was constructed with a Town lattice, patented by Ithiel Town who is said to have supervised the construction of the bridge. If accurate, Town would have supervised the construction of the current bridge in the years preceding his death. The bridge has vertical planking and the seams are covered by battens and the roof of the structure has wood shingles. A lot of the joinery has been preserved, though the queen-post trusses around the Town lattices are not original.

The bridge was originally tolled, costing 6 cents for a horse and carriage, and 3 cents for foot passengers. These were abolished in 1867. Between 1902 and 1903, the bridge was raised up as part of a development project on the nearby dam. In 1949, the Connecticut State Highway Department "replaced much of the lower chords and all of the treenails". In 1969, the last major alteration was the installation of large plate girders to support the weight of traffic, which were concealed from view with the addition of exterior sheathing. The cost of the project was originally estimated at $50,000 in 1967, equivalent to $480,000 in 2025, and noted that any changes in the appearance of the bridge would have to be approved by the Kent's Board of selectmen.

== Importance ==
Bull's Bridge is very significant and important as one of three surviving covered bridges in the state of Connecticut. The other two surviving bridges exhibit designs that are different from Bull's Bridge. Though the West Cornwall Covered Bridge was constructed with a Town lattice, the design was reinforced and altered to give it a unique appearance, though it also has two uneven length spans and a gable roof. The Comstock's Bridge is not in use, but exhibits Howe truss design.

The bridge was listed in the National Register of Historic Places, which stated that, "No effort should be spared to assure its preservation for the indefinite future, especially as it is not simply a museum piece but is daily serving a considerable volume of traffic on a route that, if eliminated, would compel a lengthy and inconvenient detour northward or southward to reach the destinations served by this road." The bridge was added to the National Register of Historic Places on April 26, 1972.

== See also ==
- List of bridges on the National Register of Historic Places in Connecticut
- List of covered bridges in Connecticut
- National Register of Historic Places listings in Litchfield County, Connecticut
