= List of covered bridges in Connecticut =

Below is a list of covered bridges in Connecticut. As of 2021, there were nine authentic covered bridges in the U.S. state of Connecticut; three of these are historic. A covered bridge is considered authentic not due to its age, but by its construction. An authentic bridge is constructed using trusses rather than other methods such as stringers, a popular choice for non-authentic covered bridges.

== Bridges ==
| Name | Image | County | Location | Built | Length | Crosses | Ownership | Truss | Notes |
|---|---|---|---|---|---|---|---|---|---|
| The Barn Yard Covered Bridge | Barn Yard Covered Bridge | Tolland | Ellington; 41°53′7″N 72°27′53″W | 2021 | 56 feet (17 m) | Belding Brook | | Town | |
| Blackwell Brook Bridge | Blackwell Brook Covered Bridge | Windham | Brooklyn; 41°47′53″N 71°58′55″W | 2010 | 35 feet (11 m) | Blackwell Brook | | Howe | |
| Bull's Bridge | Bull's Bridge | Litchfield | Kent; 41°40′32″N 73°30′35″W | ca. 1870 | 109 feet (33 m) | Housatonic River | Town of Kent | Town | |
| Comstock's Bridge | Comstock's Bridge | Middlesex | East Hampton; 41°33′11″N 72°26′57″W | 1840, 1868, rebuilt 2011 | 95 feet (29 m) | Salmon River | State of Connecticut | Howe | Has an adjacent 36 feet (11 m) pony queen truss bridge |
| Gold Mine Bridge | | New London | Norwich; 41°31′9″N 72°7′38″W | 2015 | 60 feet (18 m) | stream | Private | Town | |
| Huckleberry Hill Bridge | Huckleberry Hill Bridge | Hartford | Avon; 41°47′10″N 72°54′31″W | 1968 | 36 feet (11 m) | Pond outlet | Town of Avon | Pratt variant | |
| Johnsonville Village Bridge | Johnsonville Covered Bridge | Middlesex | Johnsonville Village; 41°29′45″N 72°27′59″W | 1976 | 60 feet (18 m) | Moodus River | Private | Multiple king with arch | Also called Bicentennial Bridge |
| West Cornwall Covered Bridge | West Cornwall Covered Bridge | Litchfield | West Cornwall; 41°52′18″N 73°21′52″W | 1864 | 173 feet (53 m) | Housatonic River | Town of Cornwall | Town | Also called Hart Covered Bridge |
| Worthington Pond Farm Bridge | Worthington Pond Farm Bridge | Tolland | Somers; 42°1′1″N 72°24′49″W | 2002 | 62 feet (19 m) | Pond outlet | Private | Town with arch | |

== See also ==
- List of bridges on the National Register of Historic Places in Connecticut
- World Guide to Covered Bridges
