= September 1, 1969, Berkshire UFO incident =

1969 UFO incident in Berkshire County, Massachusetts, US

The Labor Day 1969 UFO incident is an alleged encounter with an unidentified flying object (or UFO) that occurred on the night of 1 September 1969, in Berkshire County, Massachusetts. The Thom Reed UFO Park was established to commemorate the purported event, and over 250 people were claimed to have witnessed the object. The incident has been deemed a "significantly historic and true event" by the Great Barrington Historical Society and Massachusetts historians, though other local historians and journalists have expressed doubts. Despite being depicted as the most-seen UFO in the history of Berkshire County, no tangible record of any report made at the time to police or media has ever been found.

== Alleged encounters ==
The most famous encounter from this incident was alleged to have occurred in Sheffield near Old Covered Bridge. Thomas Reed and his family were crossing the bridge when they reportedly witnessed a disc-shaped object hovering in the air. Reed described the craft as a "white orb" that was "bigger than a football field". They tried escaping the UFO by continuing towards Covered Bridge Lane, but the craft followed them. Reed says the car was engulfed in light as they were pulled into the UFO. When Reed took a polygraph test, he was found to be 99.1% truthful.

Another alleged incident is said to have occurred at Lake Mansfield in Great Barrington. Melanie Kirchdorfer and her family had traveled to the lake. When her father backed into the parking lot, a very bright light engulfed their car. Everyone in the vehicle began to panic. Her father decided to chase the light, despite Melanie urging him not to. Reportedly, she and her sister began to shake in fear, and her sister did not remember anything after that. However, Melanie remembered levitating and then being aboard a ship. She subsequently remembered being laid out. Tom Warner remembered seeing Melanie to the right of him on the ship. He recalled observing that her expression was fearful; however, she did not remember seeing him. She recalled being in a room with several other children. Suddenly, the other children began to disappear, one by one. After that, she woke up at the lake by herself, and had to walk home. Meanwhile, Tom remembered at the same time being laid down on his back at the other end of his family's property.

Though the narratives were consistent with the alleged phenomenon of alien abductions, the witnesses involved in these incidents reportedly took offense to it being called an abduction, and have been reticent to use the word "abduction" to describe the encounters. This is different from other notable UFO sightings in the United States.

== UFO Monument Park ==
To commemorate the incident, a park was founded in 2015 on the banks of the Housatonic River by the town of Sheffield where Thom Reed's encounter is claimed to have occurred. A 5,000-pound (2,300 kg) granite monument was placed in the park from 2015 until 2019, when it was replaced by a sign which reads:

"On behalf of the citizens of Commonwealth of Massachusetts, I am pleased to confer upon you this Governor's citation in recognition of the off-world incident on September 1, 1969, which engaged the Reed family, which has been established. Your dedicated service to this incident was factually upheld, founded, and deemed historically significant and true by means of Massachusetts historians. The records highlighting the historic event are now officially part of the Great Barrington, MA Historical Society's collection and your recent induction into Massachusetts history."

The plaque was signed in error by then-Governor Charlie Baker after a persistent Reed asked the governor's staff to put Baker's signature on it, a Baker spokesman said. The Town of Sheffield has been involved in a dispute with a private landowner near the park over the location and return of the granite monument for several years.

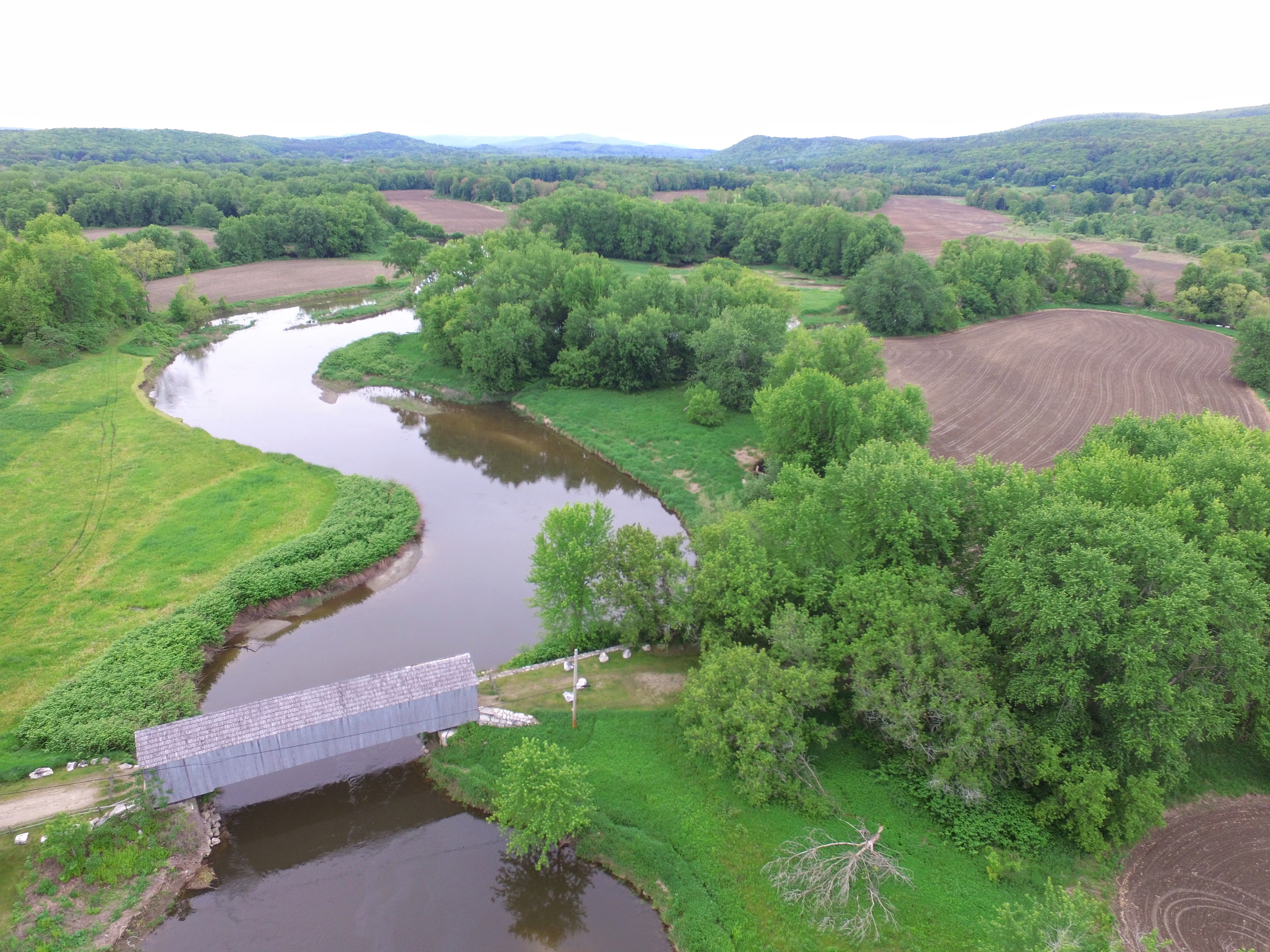
Aerial view of the park

== In popular culture ==
The Netflix reboot of Unsolved Mysteries dedicated an entire episode to the incident.

The YouTube channel Yes Theory made a documentary about the incident with interviews from people who reportedly witnessed the alleged craft. The documentary has over 6.5 million views as of 3 October 2023.

The BBC Radio 4 series Uncanny covered this incident in a show broadcast on 24 June 2024 and featured interviews with Thomas Reed and Melanie Kirchdorfer.
