= NHRC =

NHRC may refer to:

- National Harm Reduction Coalition, an American advocacy group
- Naval Health Research Center, a military research center that is operated by the U.S Department of Defense on San Diego, California
- New Haven Rowing Club, a rowing club on the Housatonic River in Oxford, Connecticut, United States of America

It may refer to various National Human Rights Commissions:

- National Human Rights Commission of India, a statutory body established in 1993, under the provisions of The Protection of Human Rights Act, 1993
- National Human Rights Commission of Bangladesh, a statutory body established in 2007.
- Myanmar National Human Rights Commission, Burma's (Myanmar) independent national human rights commission
- National Human Rights Commission (Nepal), Nepal's independent human rights commission
- National Human Rights Committee (Qatar), a human rights committee in Qatar
