= Sheffield Center Historic District =

Historic district in Massachusetts, United States

- U.S. National Register of Historic Places
- U.S. Historic district
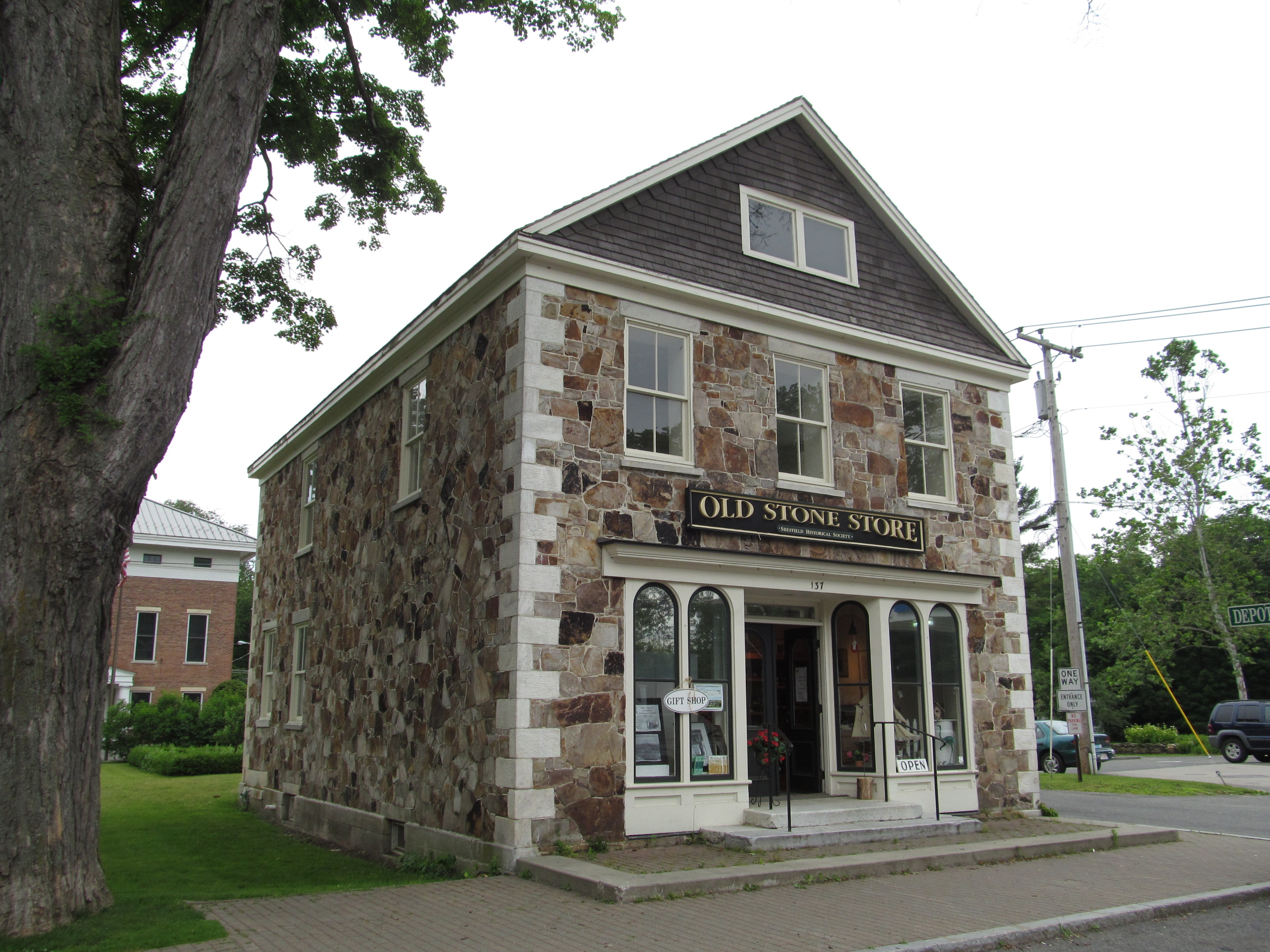
- Old Stone Store

- Location within Massachusetts Location within the United States
- Location: Sheffield, Massachusetts
- Coordinates: 42°6′22″N 73°21′9″W
- Area: 117 acres (47 ha)
- Architect: Multiple
- Architectural style: Greek Revival, Georgian, Federal
- NRHP reference No.: 89002060
- Added to NRHP: December 1, 1989

The Sheffield Center Historic District encompasses the historic village center of Sheffield, Massachusetts. The village extends linearly along United States Route 7, roughly between Maple Avenue and Berkshire School Road, and includes the town's major civic and religious buildings. The area's principal period of development was between 1760 and the 1890s. It was listed on the National Register of Historic Places in 1989.

== Description and history ==
The town of Sheffield is located in southwestern Massachusetts, just north of the border with Connecticut. Its first area of permanent European settlement, established in 1726, was in the Sheffield Plain area, north of the present center. A village developed there, and at Ashley Falls, several miles to the south. Wanting a more centrally located meeting house, Sheffield's citizens erected the present Old Parish Church near its current location in 1760. From this beginning, the center gradually grew in importance as the town's principal focus for civic, economic, and religious affairs.

The building that serves as town hall was built as a commercial building c. 1825 and acquired by the town in 1878; it is a fine Greek Revival stone structure with marble quoining. Other civic buildings include the library, Dewey Memorial Hall (a community center), the town's first high school, and the old Sheffield Academy building, which was originally in the Plain village. When the Housatonic Railroad was laid through the town in the 1840s, a station was placed in the center; the only surviving elements of this area freight house (still in its original location), and the passenger depot (relocated onto US 7). Most of the housing in the village is 2 1/2-story wood-frame construction, in a diversity of 18th to late 19th century architectural styles. Three brick houses from the Georgian (18th century) period are notable for their state of preservation.

== See also ==
- National Register of Historic Places listings in Berkshire County, Massachusetts
