= West Cornwall Covered Bridge =

United States historic place

- West Cornwall Covered Bridge, spanning the Housatonic River
- Coordinates: 41°52′18″N 73°21′52″W
- West Cornwall Bridge
- U.S. National Register of Historic Places
- Location within Connecticut Location within the United States
- Coordinates: 41°52′18″N 73°21′52″W
- Area: 1 acre (0.4 ha)
- NRHP reference No.: 75001923
- Added to NRHP: December 30, 1975
- Carries: Sharon-Goshen Turnpike (Connecticut Route 128)
- Crosses: Housatonic River
- Locale: Cornwall, Connecticut
- Maintained by: State of Connecticut

Characteristics
- Design: Town lattice truss bridge
- Material: Wood
- Total length: 172 feet (52.4 m)
- Width: 15 feet (4.6 m)
- No. of spans: 2
- Piers in water: 1

History
- Opened: Circa 1864

Location
- Interactive map of West Cornwall Covered Bridge

The West Cornwall Covered Bridge (an earlier incarnation was known as the Hart Bridge) is a wooden covered lattice truss bridge carrying the Sharon-Goshen Turnpike over the Housatonic River in the town of Cornwall, Connecticut. Records indicate that a bridge may have been in place in this location as early as 1762. A previous bridge was destroyed in the flood of 1837 and a new bridge was constructed in 1841. This bridge would also be destroyed and the current bridge would be completed circa 1864. Utilizing the central pier from the previous incarnation, despite the Town lattice being able to withstand the weight and single span, the bridge has two spans. The later addition of queen trusses and supports gives the bridge an unusual appearance. Modernization of the bridge in 1968 and 1973 has continued to let the bridge handle traffic. It was added to the National Register of Historic Places in 1975.

== History ==
Located at the north-south and east-west roadway section of the riverside town of Cornwall, Connecticut, numerous bridges have been built at this location. As early as 1762, a bridge may have been in service here. The lifespan of these bridges was not a long term one, for floods and ice would demolish them frequently. Peter Vermilyea, author of Hidden History of Litchfield County, states that wooden bridges had typical life spans of seven to ten years. Town records list expenditures for repair and placement. For many decades the current West Cornwall bridge was believed to have been constructed in 1841, as a replacement for an earlier bridge that washed away in the flood of 1837. The 1841 date was even included on the National Register of Historic Places nomination and was claimed to have been supervised by Ithiel Town himself. At least one, but possibly several incarnations of these earlier bridges were known as the Hart Bridge, after a settler of West Cornwall. Local tradition states that Selectman Marcus Smith traveled to North Adams, Massachusetts to choose the timber for the bridge. The 1841 bridge may have been overseen by Ithiel Town, but the current bridge dates to about 1864 according to research by Michael R. Gannett for the Cornwall Historical Society. The center pier which supports of the middle bridge was likely reused from the previous bridge. In 1968, the State of Connecticut added the bridge to the state system and considered replacing it. A local committee in West Cornwall was created and organized to save the covered bridge, through their efforts the Connecticut Department of Transportation decided to renovate the bridge. The bridge was raised up an additional two feet and steel supports were inserted to support the roadway. In 1973, the roadway was reinforced with the addition of a concealed steel deck to support the weight of traffic. This project would win the Federal Highway Administration's award for outstanding historic preservation.

Throughout its history, the bridge has endured against a series of disasters that threatened to demolish it. Flooding as a result of the 1938 New England hurricane and the flood of 1955, caused by the combined effects of both Hurricane Connie and Hurricane Diane, threatened to wash the bridge away. In 1961, a severe ice jam threatened to destroy the bridge, but the jam was successfully dynamited. The bridge also had to be repaired in 1945 after a 20-ton oil truck fell through the bridge floor. In December 2022, the bridge had to be closed for a week after a pickup truck and its trailer hit the bridge.

== Description ==
Constructed in 1864, the West Cornwall covered bridge is 172 feet (52 m) long, 15 feet (4.6 m) wide and supports one lane of vehicle traffic for the Sharon-Goshen Turnpike (Route 128). The bridge's Town lattice truss is constructed of red-spruce timbers secured by treenails and the span is made of native oak. A secondary queen-post truss was added to the bridge at a later date, with one source stating that this was in 1887. The addition of the queen-post truss was likely to stiffen the bridge because wooden trusses have a tendency to sag. Prior to 1946, the bridge had a square port with a flat top, but this was modified to a gable roof which remains today. In 1957, the bridge was painted red for the first time.

The bridge consists of two spans, 64.1 feet and 81.10 feet, with a 3.2 feet gap between them. The combined trussed portions of the bridge are 149.1 feet long. The bridge's Town lattice is an unusual design choice, but the later addition of the queen trusses are also unusual, resulting in a unique visual appearance by the bridge's unequal spans. This gives the appearance of kingposts within the queenposts. Since the addition of the steel I-beam flooring in 1973, the trusses have supported nothing but themselves. The State of Connecticut's lists the bridge as CT 1338 and the May 2012 inspection of the bridge found the deck and superstructure conditions to be satisfactory and condition of the substructure to be fair. The West Cornwall Covered bridge has been appraised as functionally obsolete.

== Significance ==
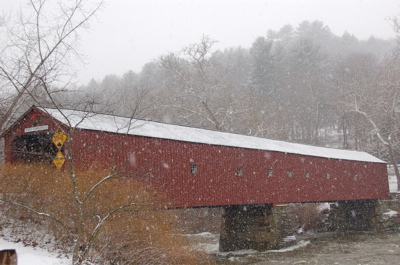
The bridge in winter.

The West Cornwall covered bridge is very significant and important as one of only three surviving covered bridges in the state of Connecticut. The bridge's modification from the original Town lattice represents a unique design that is not repeated in either the Comstock's Bridge or Bull's Bridge. The covered bridge is perhaps best known for being featured on postcards of New England villages. Terry Miller and Ronald Knapp assert that Charles Ives passed by the bridge on the way to the Berkshires which inspired the third movement in the Three Places in New England. The bridge appeared in the opening scenes of the movie, Valley of the Dolls a 1967 American drama film based on the 1966 novel of the same name by Jacqueline Susann. This brief scene occurs near the 2 minute mark of the film, during the opening credits. The bridge was listed on the National Register of Historic Places in 1975.

Numerous photos, including photos from before the 20th-century renovations, are contained in Connecticut and Rhode Island Covered Bridges.

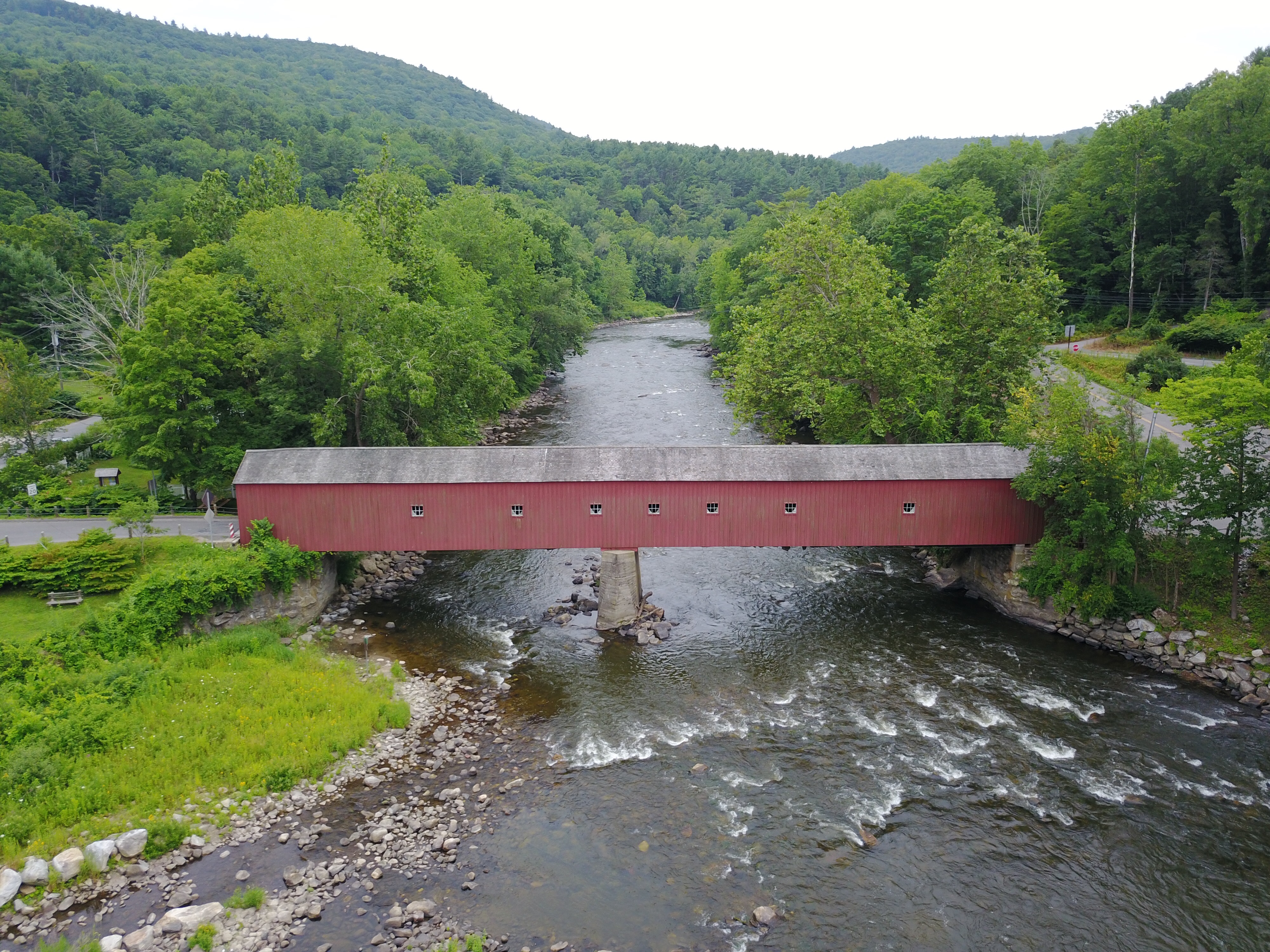
Aerial view of the bridge.

== See also ==
- List of bridges on the National Register of Historic Places in Connecticut
- List of covered bridges in Connecticut
- National Register of Historic Places listings in Litchfield County, Connecticut
