= Marvelwood School =

The Marvelwood School

Location
- 476 Skiff Mountain Road; New England; Kent, Litchfield, Connecticut, Connecticut 06757-1112; United States; 41°46′57″N 73°27′35″W

Information
- School type: Non-Profit, High School
- Motto: Latin: Aeterna lux scientiae
- Religious affiliation: Nonsectarian
- Established: 1956 (70 years ago)
- Founders: Robert Bodkin & Ian Hanna
- CEEB code: 070117
- NCES School ID: 00232734
- Dean: Heather Brand
- Head of school: Blythe Everett
- Faculty: 26 (on an FTE basis)
- Grades: 9–12
- Gender: Coeducational
- Enrollment: 125 (2023–2024)
- International students: 15%
- Average class size: 10
- Student to teacher ratio: 3:1
- Classes offered: >100
- Hours in school day: 6.8
- Campuses: Skiff Mountain
- Campus size: 86 acres
- Campus type: Rural
- Houses: Summit Dorm, Sterling Dorm, Star Dorm, Lake Dorm, Sundt House
- Colors: Blue and white
- Athletics: Soccer, Volleyball, Cross Country, Wrestling, Basketball, Skiing/Snowboarding, Tennis, Lacrosse, Equestrian
- Athletics conference: HVAL (Hudson Valley Athletic League)
- Sports: Lacrosse
- Mascot: Terry the Pterodactyl
- Nickname: Pterodactyls
- Newspaper: Pterodactyl Times
- Yearbook: Prism
- Endowment: $10.5 million
- Annual tuition: $75,400 boarding, $48,000 day
- Revenue: $10.3 million
- Affiliation: NAIS
- Website: marvelwood.org

The Marvelwood School is a college preparatory private boarding school located in Kent, Connecticut, United States.

== History ==
Marvelwood was founded in 1956 by Robert A. Bodkin and Ian Hanna in Cornwall, Connecticut, on a campus previously occupied by Rumsey Hall School. Ian Hanna named the school after his relative, Donald Grant Mitchell, an American novelist who owned an estate in New Haven, Connecticut, also called Marvelwood.

Bodkin remained headmaster until 1981. He was succeeded by Peter B. Tacy until 1989, H. Mark Johnson until 1997, Anne Davidson Scott until 2005, Scott E. Pottbecker until 2011, and Arthur F. Goodearl until 2018. Blythe Everett, parents of 2014–16, is the current head of the school.

In 1995, Marvelwood moved from its campus in Cornwall to the former Kent School girls' campus about 10 miles (16 km) away on Skiff Mountain in Kent, Connecticut.

== Admissions ==
The Marvelwood student body consists primarily of boarding students, with about 20% commuting from home. Of those boarding students, about 24% are international. The school offers a three-level ESL program for foreign speakers.

=== Demographics ===
Enrollment by race or ethnicity, 2019–2020
White	Asian	Black	Hispanic
65	24	9	4

== Curriculum ==
Students participate in weekly community service, competitive athletics, creative arts programs, and film studies programs. Marvelwood works locally with the Audubon Sharon and Institute for Bird Populations.

== Notable alumni ==
- Jake Burton Carpenter – founder of Burton Snowboards
- John P. Hammond – blues singer and guitarist
- Arthur Levering – classical composer
