= Flanders Historic District =

Historic district in Connecticut, United States

- U.S. National Register of Historic Places
- U.S. Historic district
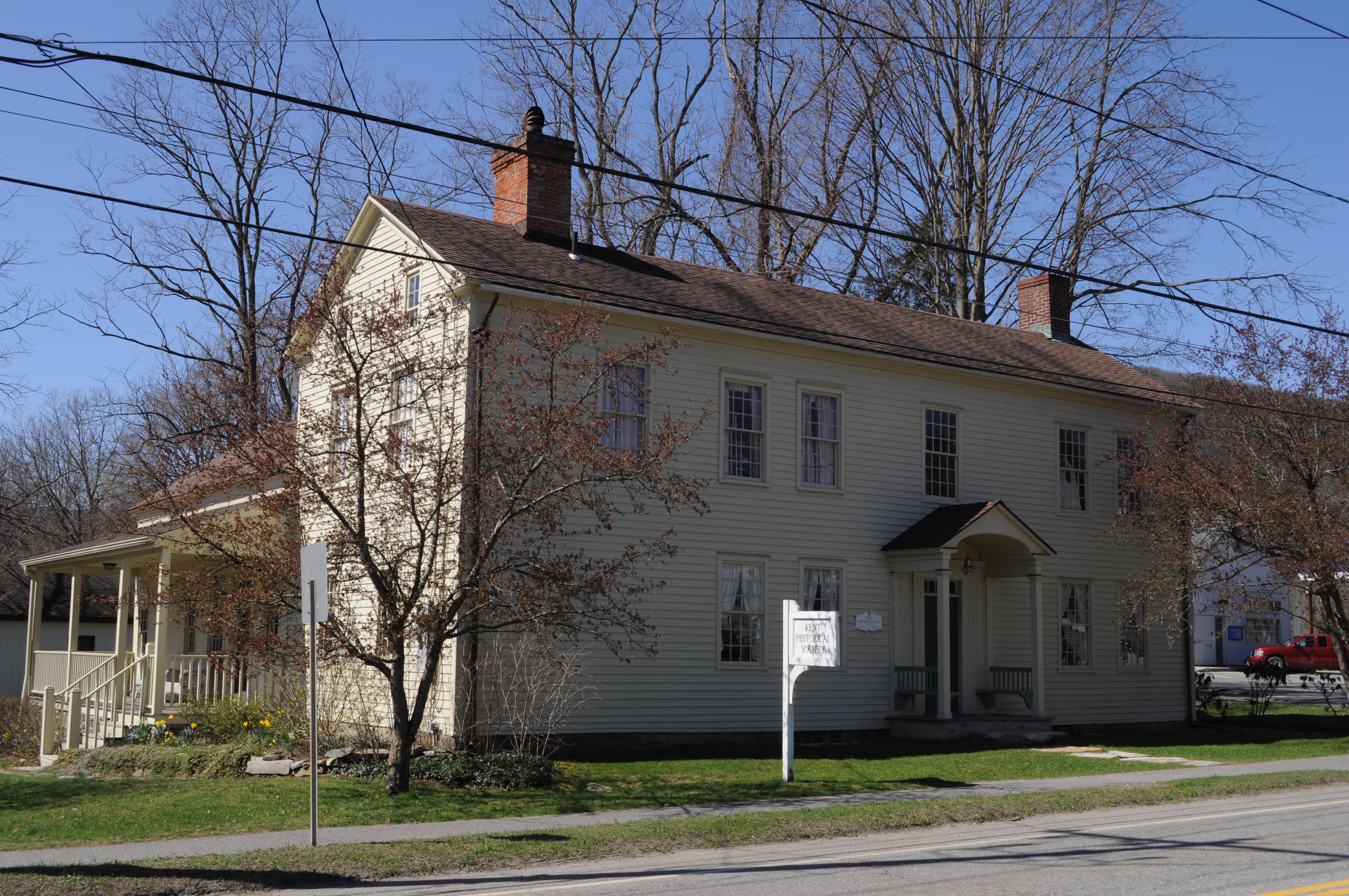
- "Seven Hearths", c. 1754, a Kent Historical Society property; it was the house of John Beebe, Jr.

- Location within Connecticut Location within the United States
- Location: U.S. Route 7, Cobble Road, Cobble Lane, and Studio Hill Road Kent, Connecticut
- Coordinates: 41°44′22″N 73°27′25″W
- Area: 63 acres (25 ha)
- Built: 1741
- Architectural style: Greek Revival, Colonial, Federal
- NRHP reference No.: 79002618
- Added to NRHP: April 13, 1979

The Flanders Historic District is a historic district that encompasses a small cluster of late-18th to early-19th century residential structures north of the center of Kent, Connecticut, United States which was the original heart of the community when it was first settled. It is centered at the junction of U.S. Route 7 with Cobble Road and Studio Hill Road. The area was supplanted by the current town center in the 1840s. The district was listed on the National Register of Historic Places in 1979.

== Description and history ==
The town of Kent was established in 1738, with the Connecticut Colony auctioning off land in this area late in that year. Settlers soon arrived, and the Flanders area became the town's main settlement. The oldest deeded house is The Nathaniel Slosson Homestead c. 1739, built during the settlement of Kent. The area remained of civic importance until the 1840s, when a railroad stop was established further south. This resulted in the migration of economic and civic functions to that area, which is where the present town center is located. Since then, the Flanders area has been a quiet rural residential village.

The historic district is centered at the junction of US 7 with Cobble Road and Studio Hill Road, and covers approximately 65 acres (26 ha). It includes twelve major buildings, of which five are large Federal style houses, three are older colonial-era buildings, and two later Greek Revival structures. All of these building exhibit vernacular interpretations of those styles, with simplified decorative elements. Interior decorative elements also tend to be modest, with elaborate detailing often found only in the "best" parlor. The Federal period houses, for example, are built using traditional colonial forms, lacking period innovations such as hip roofs, but have Federal style pilasters at the corners, and may include some carved woodwork in the cornice.

== See also ==
- National Register of Historic Places listings in Litchfield County, Connecticut
