= Macedonia Brook State Park =

State park in Connecticut, United States

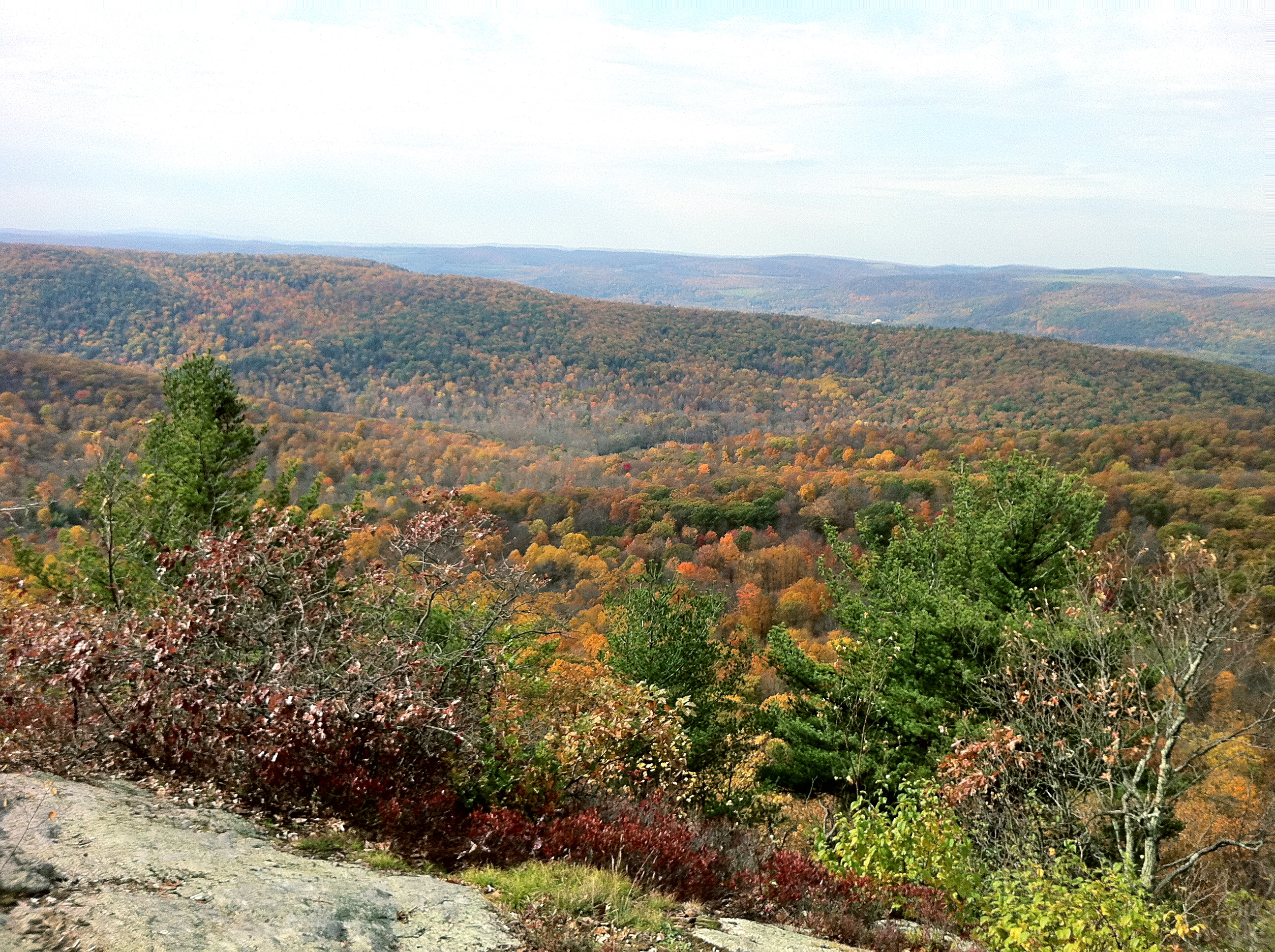
- View from Cobble Mountain summit; Catskill Mountains in the background

- Location within Connecticut Location within the United States
- Location: Kent, Connecticut, United States
- Coordinates: 41°46′36″N 73°30′02″W
- Area: 2,302 acres (932 ha)
- Elevation: 1,385 ft (422 m)
- Established: 1918
- Administrator: Connecticut Department of Energy and Environmental Protection
- Designation: Connecticut state park
- Website: Official website

Macedonia Brook State Park is a public recreation area covering 2,302 acres (932 ha) in the town of Kent, Connecticut, United States. Visitors can camp in a 51-site campground, picnic, fish, and hike the blue-blazed Macedonia Ridge Trail, which crosses Cobble Mountain and other peaks. The park's first 1,552 acres (628 ha) were a gift made in 1918 by the White Memorial Foundation.
