= Sheffield Plain Historic District =

Historic district in Massachusetts, United States

- U.S. National Register of Historic Places
- U.S. Historic district
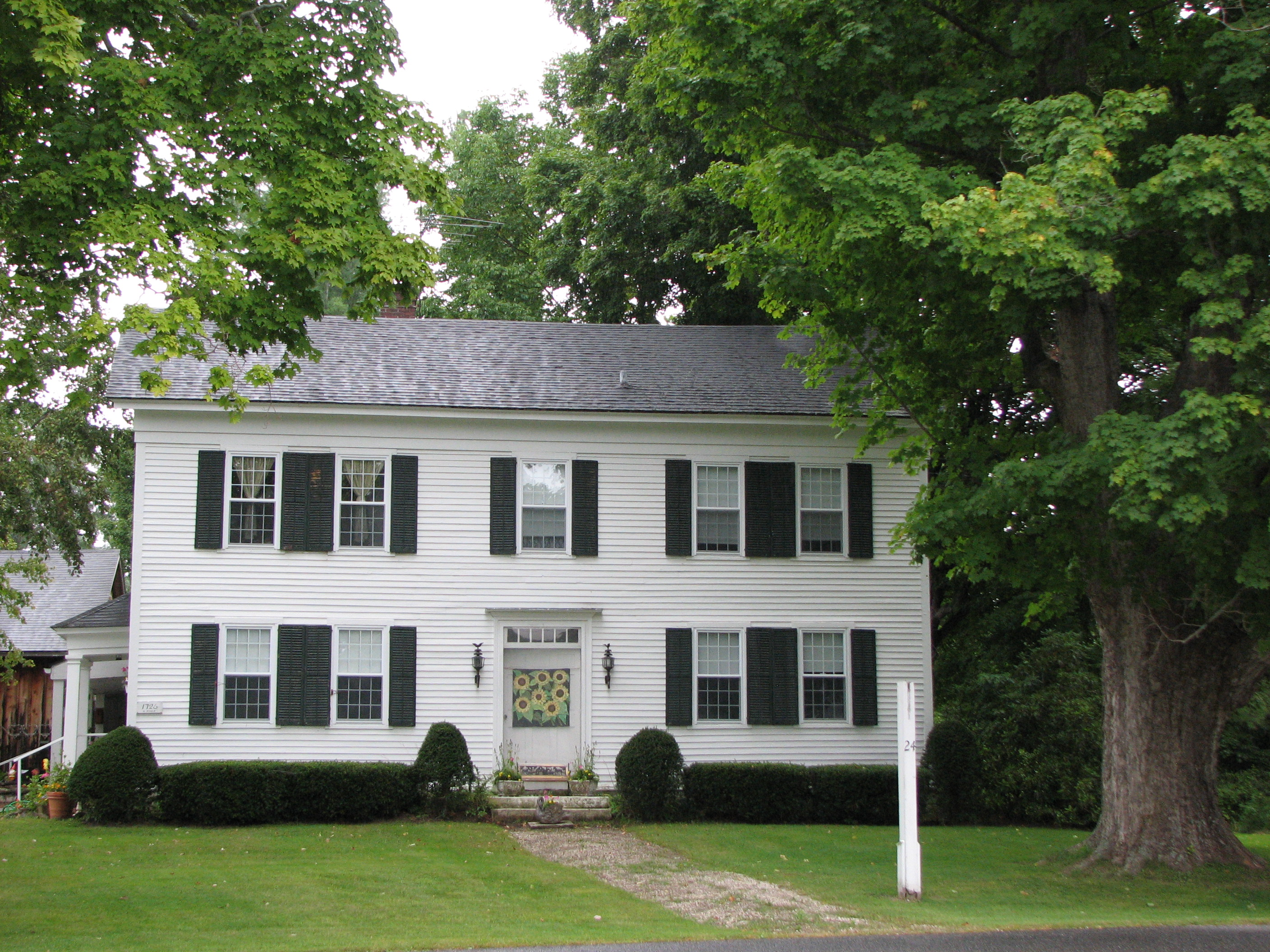
- Noble house, south elevation, 2014 (1760 front to house with 1726 ell)

- Location within Massachusetts Location within the United States
- Location: Sheffield, Massachusetts
- Coordinates: 42°7′22″N 73°21′20″W
- Area: 27 acres (11 ha)
- Architectural style: Greek Revival, Georgian, Federal
- NRHP reference No.: 88000881
- Added to NRHP: June 23, 1988

The Sheffield Plain Historic District encompasses the original 18th-century village center of Sheffield, Massachusetts, United States. The linear district extends southward about 0.5 miles (0.80 km) from the junction of United States Route 7 and Cook Road, where the original town common is located. The district was primarily developed in the mid-18th and early 19th centuries. It was listed on the National Register of Historic Places in 1988.

== Description and history ==
The town of Sheffield is located in southwestern Massachusetts, just north of the border with Connecticut. The Plains district is a particularly fertile intervale on the west side of the Housatonic River, which roughly bisects the town. This area was purchased from the local Mahicans in 1724, and the first settler, Matthew Noble, in about 1726 built the first house in what is now Sheffield roughly where Cook Street at US 7 meet; it survives as an ell to a later house. Development proceed gradually, with the north-south road (now US 7) as the main traffic artery. The town's first meeting house was probably built just west of the training ground (now the roughly triangular park bounded by Cook, US 7, and Old Mill Pond Road) in 1735. The home of Rev. Jonathan Hubbard, the community's first minister, was built in 1740, and still stands as an ell to an 1810 house on US 7.

The area saw a second spurt of growth following the establishment of a turnpike in 1801, which generally followed the alignment of US 7. It had all the trappings of a town center, with shops and taverns, and the 1840 Sheffield Academy, a school whose building was later moved to Sheffield Center. The development of a railroad along the Housatonic River valley, however, spelled the end of the Plain's importance, as the train station was located further south. The town's civic and religious focus moved to the Center, and little development has taken place in the district since the late 19th century.

The district's focal point is the triangular common at Cook Road and US 7. A linear collection of buildings extends southward on both sides of US 7 from that intersection, meeting more modern development about 0.5 miles (0.80 km) to the south. All of the buildings are 1-1/2 or 2-1/2 stories in height and of wood frame construction, and are residential or residential-commercial in use. They are all typically vernacular interpretations of Georgian, Federal and Greek Revival styling, sometimes with modest Victorian embellishments that were added later.

== See also ==
- National Register of Historic Places listings in Berkshire County, Massachusetts
