= Covered Bridges Today =

Book by Brenda Krekeler

- Author: Brenda Krekeler
- Language: English
- Subject: Covered bridges
- Genre: Architecture
- Publisher: Daring Books
- Publication date: 1989
- Publication place: United States
- ISBN: 0938936727

Covered Bridges Today is a non-fiction book on the architecture of covered bridges in the United States. The book was written by Brenda Krekeler and published by Daring Books in 1989. Covered Bridges Today is a frequently cited source on the topic of covered bridges and serves as a record of numerous covered bridges that have since been dismantled or demolished since the book's publication. Krekeler's text includes 412 covered bridges in fourteen states with a complete record of all 142 covered bridges in Ohio during its writing in 1986 and 1987. The work has been utilized in numerous citations by later publications including Historic American Engineering Record surveys and New England's Covered Bridges: A Complete Guide, Indiana Covered Bridges and Covered Bridges in Virginia.

== Background ==
Covered bridges are timber-truss bridges with a roof and siding which, in most covered bridges, create an almost complete enclosure. The purpose of the covering is to keep snow from accumulating‍—‌winter snow accumulation could easily collapse a bridge, and the steep roof would tend to shed snow to either side. As of 2014, the United States has more than 800 extant covered bridges with more than 10,000 lost and historical bridges recorded by the National Society for the Preservation of Covered Bridges. Krekeler became interested in studying covered bridges, their lore and their history, while in college. Krekeler obtained her master's degree in Historical Geography from the University of Cincinnati.

== Contents ==
Covered Bridges Today provides information on 412 bridges in the states of Connecticut, Indiana, Kentucky, Maine, Maryland, Massachusetts, Michigan, New Hampshire, New York, Ohio, Pennsylvania, Vermont, Virginia and West Virginia. The book is geographically focused on Krekeler's home state of Ohio and includes all 142 remaining covered bridges in the state at the time of writing. However, the book is not a complete inventory of each state's extant bridges. When it was written, 76 of an estimated 228 Pennsylvania's bridges were included, 68 of Indiana's 98 covered bridges, and 43 of Vermont's estimated 100 bridges were also featured. Krekeler's use of estimations stems from the facts that covered bridges are lost periodically and that the bridges detailed include those restored or in immediate danger of collapse. Within a year of the publication of the book, 30 bridges were lost. Known bridges in states that are not in the listing are not named or cited. For example, West Virginia had 17 remaining bridges at time of publication, but the book only covers 10 of them.

The book includes detailed information on each state's historic bridges before providing an individual listing of surveyed bridges. Each entry includes a description of the bridge, its history, a black and white photograph, and a local street map with directions. Interspersed throughout the book is a collection of color photographs ranging from a full page to a quarter page in size. Krekeler states that construction dates prior to 1850 are often questionable because of an absence of records and that these early sources would often contradict one another. Krekeler's bibliography cites an extensive collection of state maps, numerous local newspaper sources and works like World Guide to Covered Bridges by Richard Donovan. The information and sources used are cited at the end of each entry listing in the book, directly following the directions to the bridge. The book does not contain a typical index and instead favors a listing of bridges after the introduction of the state. The book was published in 1989 by Daring Books.

== Impact ==
Larry Hart's review of the work focused on Krekeler's basic explanation of the various types of covered bridges from the early 1800s to the 1920s and the historical facts and trivia contained within about the distribution and surviving covered bridges. Hart recounts the claim that it is the "only complete pictorial study of covered bridges in the United States". Though Hart's review incorporates much of the book's text, Hart shares an affinity for covered bridges and relates to the destroyed Batchellerville Bridge. Krekeler writes that she wished the Batchellerville Bridge had been preserved instead of being torched. Dr. Roger A. McCain notes that Krekeler's book "includes a number of states with pictorial coverage, including some really exquisite color photographs. It is not comprehensive in most cases[,] but is especially strong for Ohio and Indiana. Pennsylvania bridges are pretty extensively documented in[.]" Paul Grondahl refers to the book as an "encyclopedic, definitive work" in an article in the Times Union. Historic American Engineering Record surveys have cited Krekeler's work numerous times, ranging from the estimations of the surviving truss types of covered bridges to more general and unspecific references. Covered Bridges Today has been cited by later books on the subject of covered bridges including New England's Covered Bridges: A Complete Guide, Indiana Covered Bridges and Covered Bridges in Virginia.
