= Samuel Orcutt =

American historian and genealogist

Samuel Orcutt (c. 1824 – 1893) was an American historian and genealogist. He is the author of many books on Connecticut towns and family histories. Orcutt also wrote a history called The Indians of the Housatonic and Naugatuck Valleys.

== Biography ==
Samuel Orcutt was born in Sullivan County, New York.

He was struck by a train and killed in Bridgeport, Connecticut on January 14, 1893.

== Books ==
- History of the town of Wolcott (Connecticut) from 1731 to 1874, with an account of the centenary meeting, September 10 and 11, 1873; and with the genealogies of the families of the town. (Waterbury, Conn., Press of the American Printing Company, 1874)
- History of Torrington, Connecticut, from its first settlement in 1737, with biographies and genealogies. (Albany, J. Munsell, printer, 1878)
- The history of the old town of Derby, Connecticut, 1642-1880 : with biographies and genealogies / by Samuel Orcutt and Ambrose Beardsley. (Springfield, Mass. : Springfield Print. Co., 1880)
- History of the towns of New Milford and Bridgewater, Connecticut, 1703-1882, (Hartford, Conn., Press of the Case, Lockwood and Brainard company, 1882)
- The Indians of the Housatonic and Naugatuck Valleys (Hartford, Conn. : Press of the Case, Lockwood & Brainard Co., 1882)
- A history of the old town of Stratford and the city of Bridgeport, Connecticut. (New Haven, Conn. : Press of Tuttle, Morehouse & Taylor, 1886)
- A history of the city of Bridgeport, Connecticut / by Rev. Samuel Orcutt. (New Haven, Ct. : Published under the auspices of the Fairfield County Historical Society, 1887)
- Henry Tomlinson, and his descendants in America : with a few additional branches of Tomlinsons, later from England / by Samuel Orcutt. (New Haven: Press of Price, Lee and Adkins Co., 1891)
