= Kent, Connecticut =

- Town
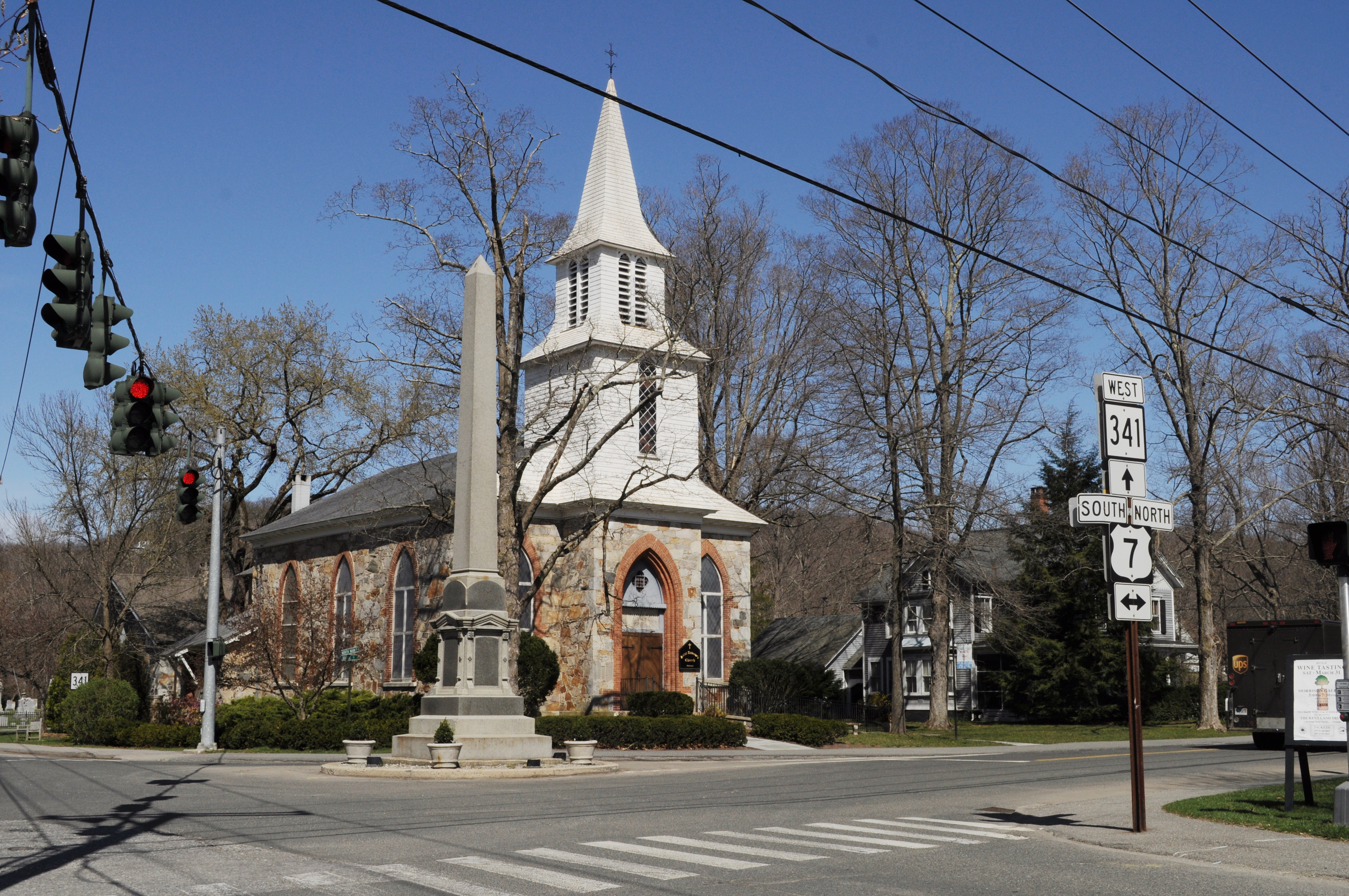
- St. Andrew's Church

- Seal
- Interactive map of Kent, Connecticut
- Coordinates: 41°43′54″N 73°27′09″W
- Country: United States
- U.S. state: Connecticut
- County: Litchfield
- Region: Northwest Hills
- Incorporated: 1739
- Named for: Kent, England

Government
  - Type: Selectman-town meeting
  - First selectman: Eric Epstein (D)
  - Selectman: Lynn Mellis Worthington (D)
  - Selectman: Lynn Harrington (R)

Area
  - Total: 49.6 sq mi (128.5 km^{2})
  - Land: 48.5 sq mi (125.7 km^{2})
  - Water: 1.0 sq mi (2.7 km^{2})
- Elevation: 466 ft (142 m)

Population (2020)
  - Total: 3,019
  - Density: 62/sq mi (24/km^{2})
- Time zone: UTC-5 (Eastern)
  - Summer (DST): UTC-4 (Eastern)
- ZIP codes: 06757, 06785
- Area codes: 860/959
- FIPS code: 09-40290
- GNIS feature ID: 0213446
- Website: www.townofkentct.gov

Kent is a town in Litchfield County, Connecticut, United States. Located alongside the border with New York, the town's population was 3,019 according to the 2020 census. The town is part of the Northwest Hills Planning Region. Kent is home to three boarding schools: Kent School, the Marvelwood School, and South Kent School. In addition, the Schaghticoke Indian Reservation is also located within town borders. Kent was also home to former U.S. Secretary of State Henry Kissinger, and is the birthplace of Family Guy creator Seth MacFarlane.

== History ==
The town of Kent was sectioned in 1737 and settled about 1739. The town was named after the county Kent in England.

== Geography ==
Kent is in western Litchfield County and is bordered to the west by Dutchess County, New York. It is 26 miles (42 kilometers) north of Danbury and 50 miles (80 km) west of Hartford. The town's central village is found at 41°43′29″N 73°28′39″W. According to the United States Census Bureau, the town has a total area of 49 5/8 square miles (128.5 km^{2}), of which 48 1/2 square miles (125.7 km^{2}) are land and 1 square mile (2.7 km^{2}), or 2.14%, is water. Bull's Bridge, one of two covered bridges open to vehicles in Connecticut, is located in the town. The town is bisected by the Housatonic River. The western half contains Macedonia Brook State Park, the Schaghticoke Indian Reservation, and a section of the Appalachian Trail.

=== Principal communities ===
- Bull's Bridge
- Flanders Historic District
- Kent Center
- Kent Furnace
- Macedonia
- North Kent
- South Kent (has its own post office)
- Schaghticoke Indian Reservation

== Points of interest ==
=== Macedonia Brook State Park ===
Macedonia Brook State Park was first opened in 1918 with a donation of 1,552 acres (628 hectares) from the White Memorial Foundation of Litchfield. Since then, it has now grown to a size of 2,300 acres (930 ha) and is used for outdoor recreation throughout the year.

Besides scenery, the park also boasts extensive trails, campgrounds, a venue for large group picnics, a small hilltop lake, and the park's namesake, Macedonia Brook. Visitors can also take advantage of the numerous grills set up around the park. From peaks on the Blue Trail, hikers can take in views of the Catskill Mountains and the Taconic Mountains.

=== Kent Falls State Park ===
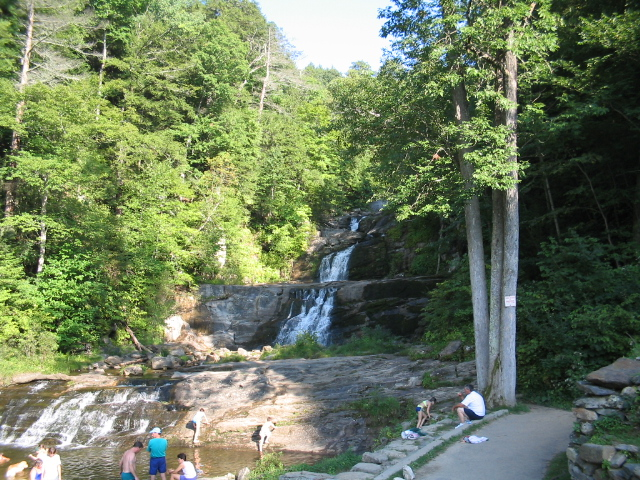
Kent Falls, before its 2005–2006 renovation

Kent Falls State Park is often called "The Jewel of the Inland Parks" with its views of 17 waterfalls. The falls are fed by wetlands which are located in Warren, and empties into the Housatonic River, which is directly across the highway from the park.

A trail winds a quarter of a mile up along the falls, and although it is not difficult to walk, it is steep, rising 250 feet (80 meters) in 1/4 mile (400 m). In 2006 a $1.1 million trail renovation was finished which provided new viewing platforms and a redesigned trail. Swimming was at one time allowed along the entire length of the falls, but due to a number of serious accidents, and large-scale damage to the natural environment, all of the area along the water above the bottom level is now closed by state law.

The park is designated as a Trout Park and is stocked with trout from the state's hatcheries. Due to the Trout Park designation the daily creel limit in the park is two fish.

=== Bulls Bridge ===
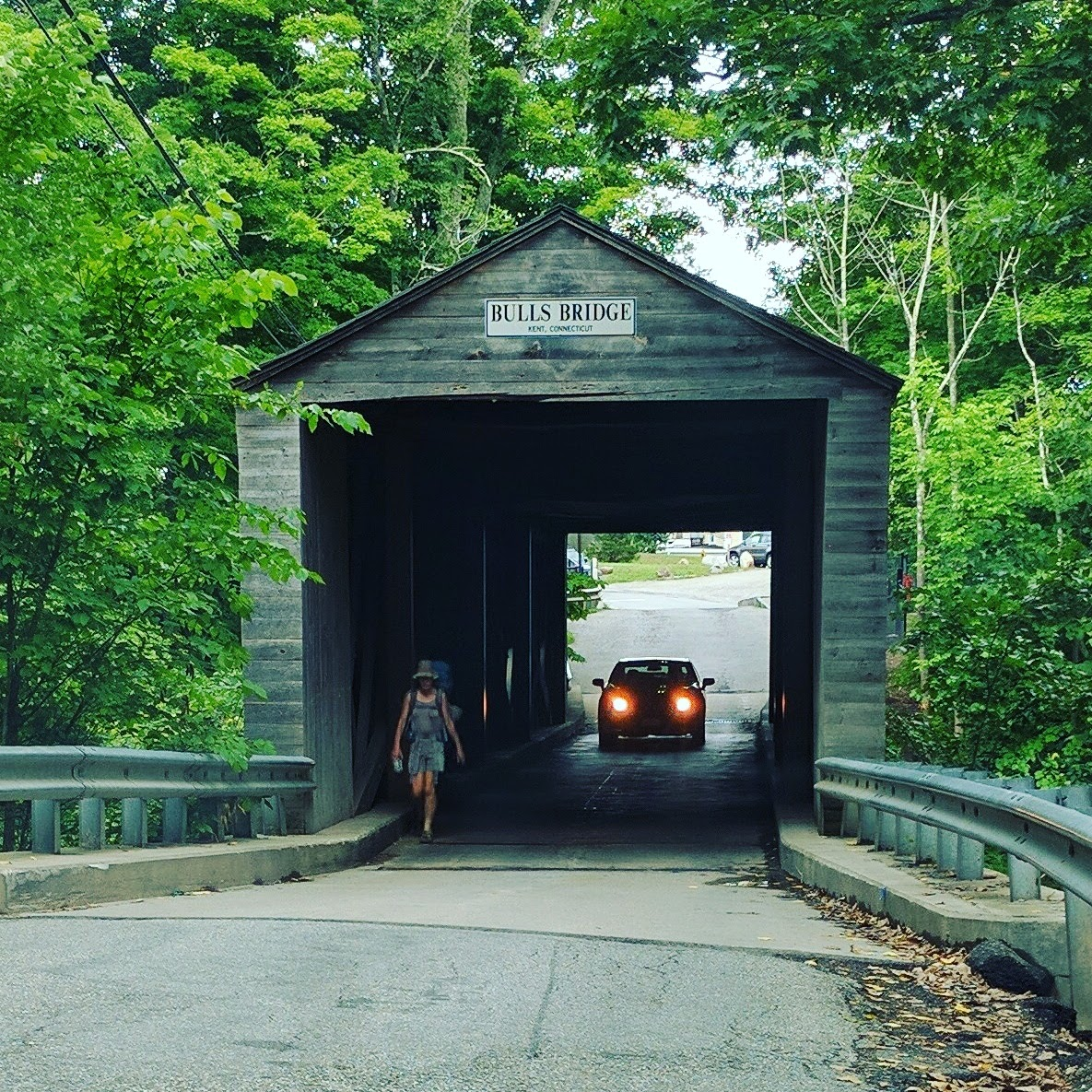
Bulls Bridge, Kent, Connecticut

Bull's Bridge is one of three remaining covered bridges in Connecticut dating from the 19th century. George Washington crossed the Housatonic River near the site of the present bridge in 1781. Built in 1842 by architect Ithiel Town, this single-lane covered bridge features a lattice truss design.

=== Sloane-Stanley Museum ===
A museum featuring the studio and antique collections of Eric Sloane.

=== Connecticut Antique Machinery Association ===
A non-profit museum dedicated to preserving and restoring antique machinery and educating the public on Connecticut's industrial and agricultural history. One notable exhibit is its 3 ft (914 mm) narrow-gauge railroad, which features an operating steam locomotive.

== Demographics ==
Historical population
Census	Pop.	Note	%±
1820	1,956		—
1850	1,848		—
1860	1,855		0.4%
1870	1,744		−6.0%
1880	1,622		−7.0%
1890	1,383		−14.7%
1900	1,220		−11.8%
1910	1,122		−8.0%
1920	1,086		−3.2%
1930	1,054		−2.9%
1940	1,245		18.1%
1950	1,392		11.8%
1960	1,686		21.1%
1970	1,990		18.0%
1980	2,505		25.9%
1990	2,918		16.5%
2000	2,858		−2.1%
2010	2,979		4.2%
2020	3,019		1.3%
U.S. Decennial Census

As of the census of 2000, there were 2,858 people, 1,143 households, and 744 families residing in the town. The population density was 59 inhabitants per square mile (23/km^{2}). There were 1,463 housing units at an average density of 30.2/sq mi (11.7/km^{2}). The racial makeup of the town was 95.77% White, 0.56% Black or African American, 0.77% Native American, 0.98% Asian, 0.03% Pacific Islander, 0.70% from other races, and 1.19% from two or more races. 2.52% of the population were Hispanic or Latino of any race. The most numerous ethnic groups in Kent are:

- English – 19%
- Irish – 16%
- German – 14%
- Italian – 7%
- Scottish – 5%

There were 1,143 households, out of which 28.6% had children under the age of 18 living with them, 55.6% were married couples living together, 6.7% had a female householder with no husband present, and 34.9% were non-families. 28.3% of all households were made up of individuals, and 12.6% had someone living alone who was 65 years of age or older. The average household size was 2.43 and the average family size was 2.99.

In the town, the population was spread out, with 22.8% under the age of 18, 5.2% from 18 to 24, 26.3% from 25 to 44, 27.8% from 45 to 64, and 17.8% who were 65 years of age or older. The median age was 43 years. For every 100 females, there were 93.9 males. For every 100 females age 18 and over, there were 90.6 males.

The median income for a household in the town was $53,906, and the median income for a family was $66,065. Males had a median income of $46,343 versus $31,493 for females. The per capita income for the town was $38,674. About 0.1% of families and 3.2% of the population were below the poverty line, including none of those under age 18 and 10.8% of those age 65 or over.

Voter registration and party enrollment as of October 26, 2021
Party	Active voters	Inactive voters	Total voters	Percentage
Democratic	936	68	1,004	44.17%
Republican	422	20	442	19.45%
Minor Parties	25	4	29	1.28%
Unaffiliated	719	79	798	35.11%
Total	2,102	171	2,273	100%

== Education and news coverage ==
Kent is a member of Regional School District 01, which also includes the towns of Canaan, Cornwall, North Canaan, Salisbury, and Sharon. Public school students attend Kent Center School from grades K–8 and Housatonic Valley Regional High School from grades 9–12. Kent also has three private schools: Kent School, a coed Episcopal independent school serving grades 9–12/PG, South Kent School, an all-boys Episcopal independent school, and Marvelwood School, a coed non-sectarian independent school.

The town is served by the Kent Good Times Dispatch local newspaper. The paper covered local news between 1952 and 2009. In 2023, the newspaper was revived. The paper paid then 9 year-old Seth MacFarlane to publish a weekly comic strip in 1981.

== Transportation ==
U.S. Route 7 is the main north–south highway in the town, while Connecticut Route 341 is the main east–west highway. Route 7 leads north 25 miles (40 km) to North Canaan and south 28 miles (45 km) to Danbury, while Route 341 leads east 8 miles (13 km) to Warren and west to the New York border and the town of Amenia.

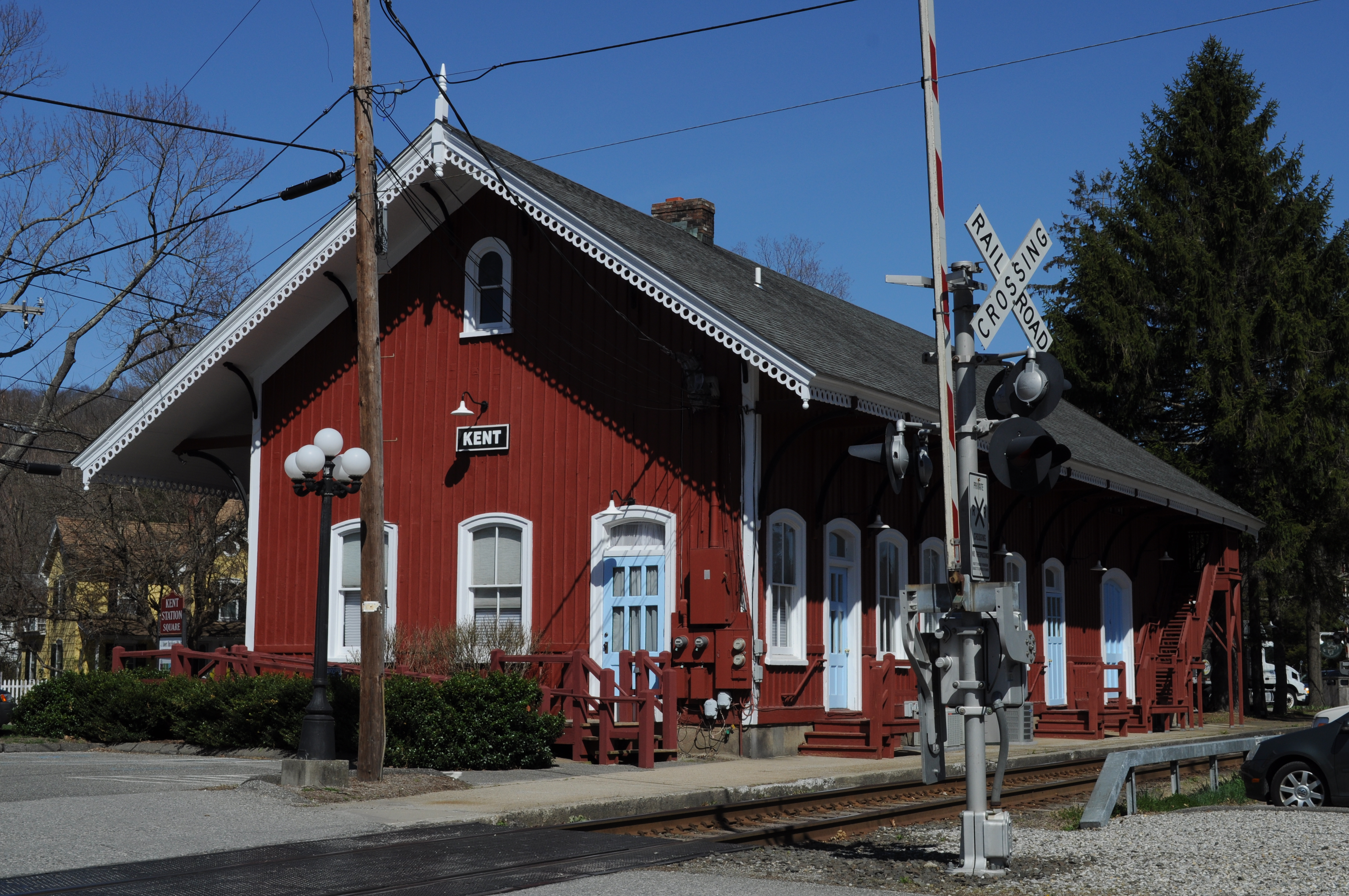
The former station building, now occupied by a pharmacy

The Kent train station was opened in 1874 by the Housatonic Railroad, later part of the New Haven Railroad. It was served by passenger trains that ran between New York City and Pittsfield, Massachusetts, until 1974. The line currently serves freight traffic operated by the revived Housatonic Railroad; the closest passenger stations are Harlem Valley–Wingdale station and Dover Plains station on Metro-North Railroad's Harlem Line.

The Northwestern Connecticut Transit District (NWCTD) operates a dial-a-ride public bus service in Kent and surrounding towns.

== Notable people ==
- William H. Armstrong, author, Sounder
- Herman R. Beardsley, Vermont Supreme Court judge
- Rex Brasher, ornithologist and watercolor painter
- James Burnham, political theorist
- Ted Danson, actor
- Oscar de la Renta, fashion designer
- Lana Del Rey, singer
- Brendan Fraser, actor
- Clinton Kelly, television host
- Adam Kennedy, actor, author, and painter
- Henry Kissinger, U.S. Secretary of State
- Trudie Lamb-Richmond, Schaghticoke elder, tribal chairwoman, American Indian activist, author, and educator
- Patti LuPone, singer and actress
- Rachael MacFarlane, voice actress and singer
- Seth MacFarlane, animator, TV producer, director, voice actor, singer, creator of Family Guy, The Cleveland Show, American Dad! and The Orville
- Edmund Morris, Pulitzer Prize-winning writer
- Lynn Redgrave, actress
- Frederick Herbert Sill, founder of Kent School
- Brooke Stevens, novelist
- Sergio Troncoso, novelist of Kent-inspired Nobody's Pilgrims

== In Popular Culture ==
The 1981 slasher film Friday the 13th Part 2, directed by Steve Miner, was filmed largely in western Connecticut, including Kent and nearby New Preston. Camp scenes were shot at Camp Kenmont on North Spectacle Pond in Kent, which stood in for the area around the fictional Crysyal Lake.

The Counselor-training center called Packanack Lodge used Bromica Lodge, a waterfront building beside the camp on Kenmont Road: the lodge was later demolished and replaced by a private house.

The film was the first in the series to make Jason Voorhees the central killer. He had appeared only briefly, as a child, at the end of Friday the 13th (1980). Amy Steel stars as Ginny Field, the film's final girl.
