= New Haven Rowing Club =

American rowing club

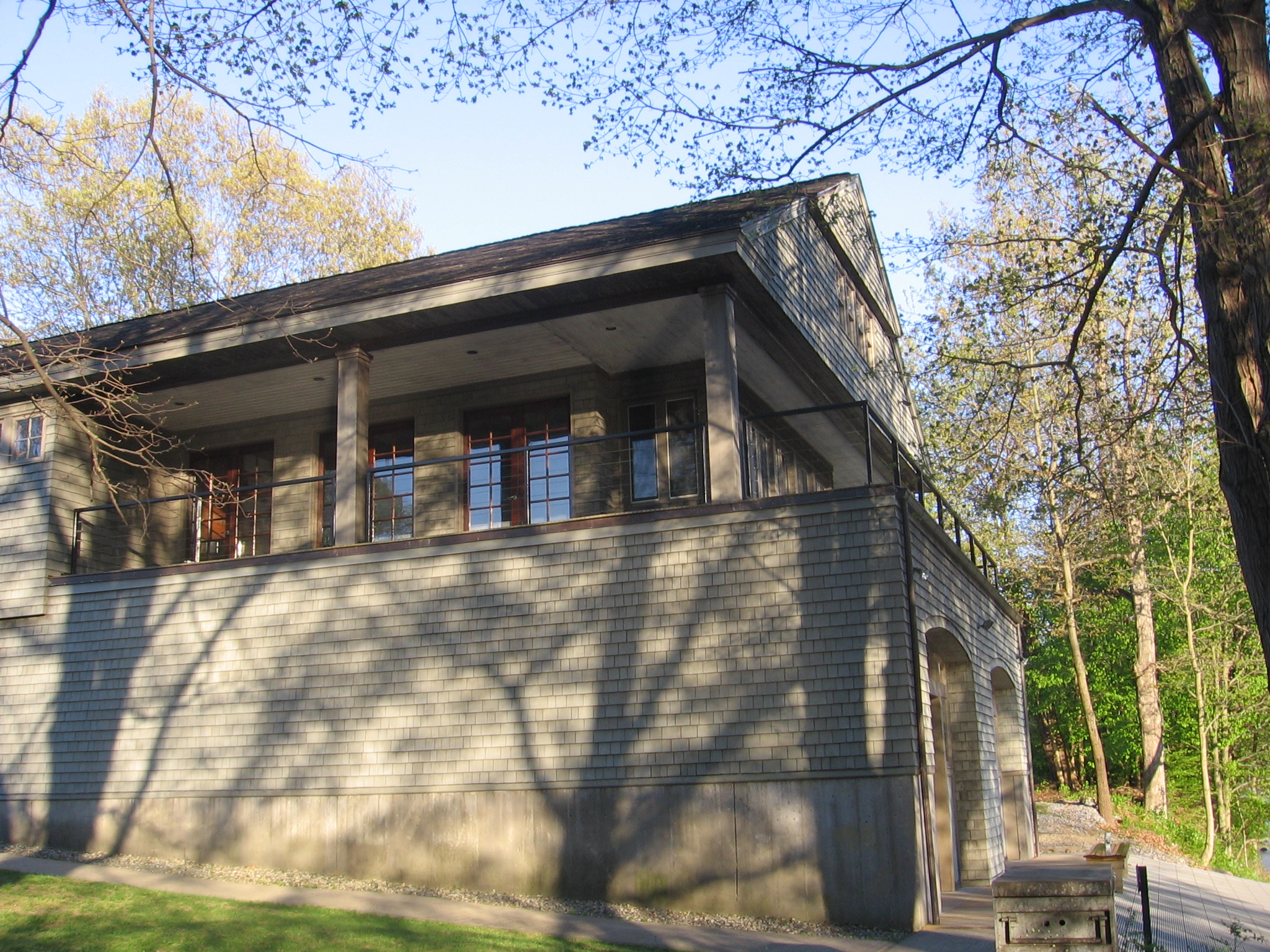

- Motto: Pulsus Remorurum Fit Spiritus Fortis
- Location: Oxford, CT
- Coordinates: 41.3687°N 73.1476°W
- Home water: Housatonic River
- Founded: 1970
- Affiliations: USRowing
- Website: www.newhavenrowingclub.org

Events
- Derby Sweeps & Sculls, Head of the Housatonic

Notable members
- Jonathan Winter

The New Haven Rowing Club is a private, non-profit, rowing club on the Housatonic River in Oxford, Connecticut, United States. Founded in 1970 by Tony Johnson, Yale University Rowing coach, to allow him to continue training his athletes throughout the summer. Late in 1970, several of the "old-timers" began to show up at the Yale boathouse in Derby, Connecticut, and thus began the Masters program of the New Haven Rowing Club.

New Haven Rowing Club used the Yale University Boathouse until 1991, when Yale needed more space and New Haven Rowing Club was also looking to increase its size. In 1992 land was acquired four miles north of the Yale boathouse, just over the Oxford Town line, on the Housatonic River. Over the next two years the boathouse was built by its members using a design by architect and fellow member Stuart Lathers.

Over the years, the New Haven Rowing Club has hosted two annual regattas. From 1999 to 2023, the club hosted the Derby Sweeps and Sculls in June - a 1,000-meter straight sprint race that ran upstream (north) and concluded at the southern end of Indian Well State Park. In October, the club hosts the Head of the Housatonic, a 2.7-mile head race that begins south of Indian Well State Park and finishes at the New Haven Rowing Club Boathouse dock.
