= Housatonic River =

River in the northeastern U.S.

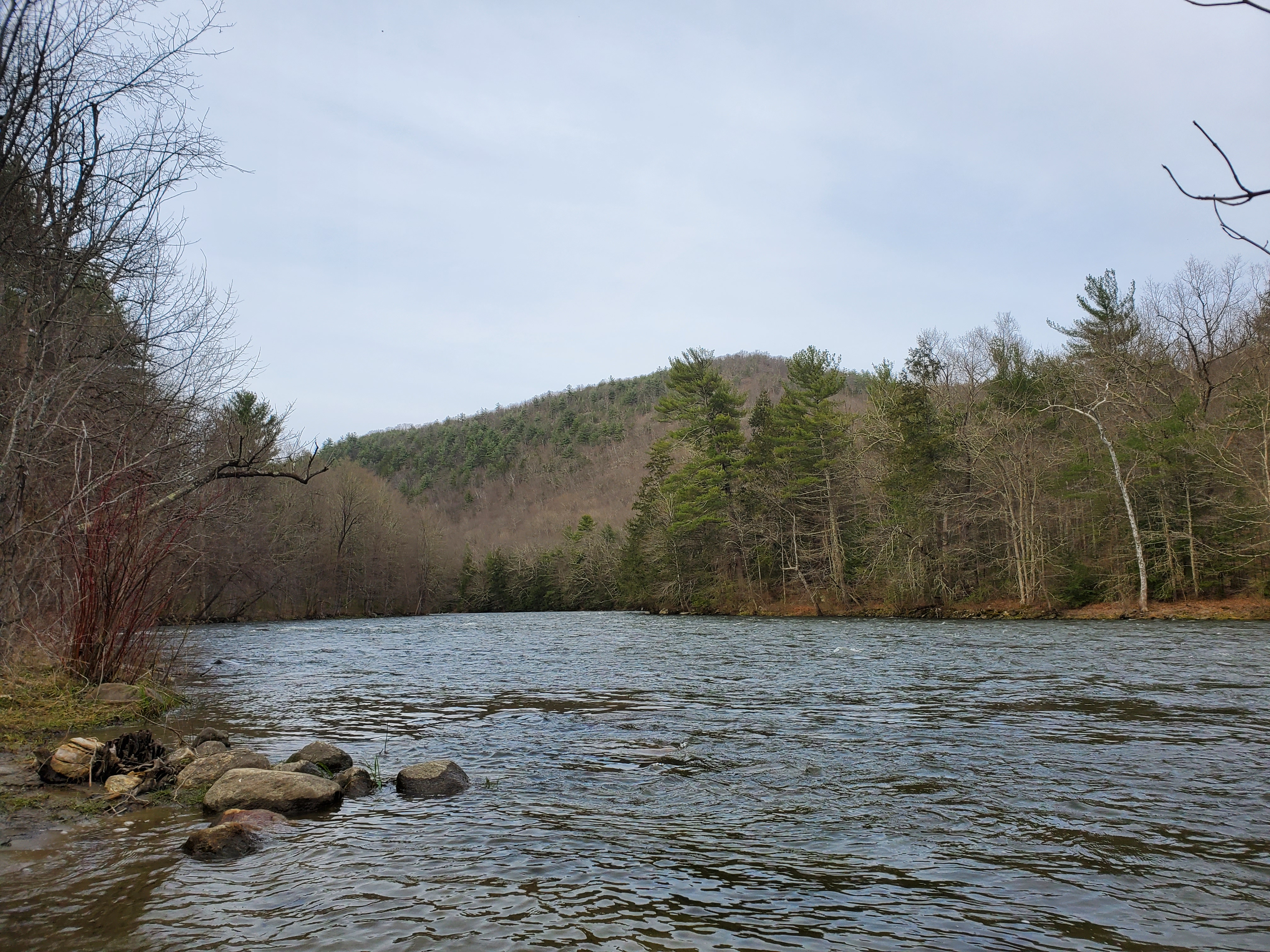
- The Housatonic River in Cornwall

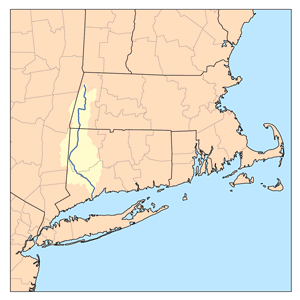
- Housatonic River watershed

Location
- Country: United States
- State: Connecticut, Massachusetts
- Counties: Fairfield, CT, Litchfield, CT, New Haven, CT, Berkshire, MA
- City: Pittsfield, MA

Physical characteristics
- Source: Confluence of West and East Branches Housatonic River
  - location: Pittsfield, Berkshire County, Massachusetts, United States
  - coordinates: 42°26′01″N 073°15′03″W
  - elevation: 959 ft (292 m)
- Mouth: Long Island Sound
  - location: Stratford, Fairfield County, Connecticut, United States
  - coordinates: 41°10′09″N 073°06′30″W
  - elevation: 0 ft (0 m)
- Length: 149 mi (240 km)
- Basin size: 1,948 sq mi (5,050 km^{2})
- Discharge
  - location: Stratford/Milford, CT
  - minimum: 54 cu ft/s (1.5 m^{3}/s)
  - maximum: 48,600 cu ft/s (1,380 m^{3}/s)
- Discharge
  - location: Great Barrington, MA

Basin features
- Tributaries
  - left: East Branch Housatonic River, Konkapot River, Blackberry River, Shepaug River, Pomperaug River, Naugatuck River
  - right: West Branch Housatonic River, Williams River, Green River, Salmon Creek, Ten Mile River, Candlewood Lake, (Note: Candlewood Lake is a pumped storage facility, so it functions as an artificial distributary when water is pumped into it from the Housatonic and a tributary when water is allowed to flow back into the river) Still River

National Wild and Scenic River
- Type: Scenic, Recreational
- Designated: December 29, 2022

The Housatonic River (/ˌhuːsəˈtɒnɪk/ HOOS-ə-TON-ik) is an approximately 149 mi (240 km) long river in western Massachusetts and western Connecticut in the United States. It flows south to southeast, and drains about 1,950 square miles (5,100 km^{2}) of southwestern Connecticut into Long Island Sound.

== History ==
=== Indigenous history ===
Indigenous people began using the river area for fishing and hunting at least 6,000 years ago. By 1600, the inhabitants were mostly Mohicans and may have numbered 30,000.

The river's name is derived from the Mohican phrase "usi-a-di-en-uk", translated as "beyond the mountain place" or "river of the mountain place". It is referred to in the deed by which a group of twelve colonists called "The Proprietors" captured the land now called Sherman and New Fairfield as "Ousetonack". Samuel Orcutt, a 19th-century historian, explained the term's pronunciation as "more properly...Howsatunnuck" and also noted an early spelling in the form of "Oweantinock". Prior to the 18th century, the river was alternatively known as the Pootatuck River. Accounts differ on the origin of this name, with some claiming that Pootatuck is an Algonquian term translating to "river of the falls" while others relate the term was eponymous, reflecting the name of the tribe that had their principal village along the river in the area of Newtown, Connecticut. "Pootatuck River" eventually came to refer a lesser tributary in the Housatonic watershed which empties into the Housatonic River at Sandy Hook, Connecticut.

The river passes through land that was formerly occupied primarily by native people of Algonquian lineage, typically living in villages of two to three hundred families housed in hide wigwams. These native inhabitants burned the forests along the Housatonic Valley in the autumn to keep the underbrush down, a practice which was customary throughout Connecticut prior to European settlement.

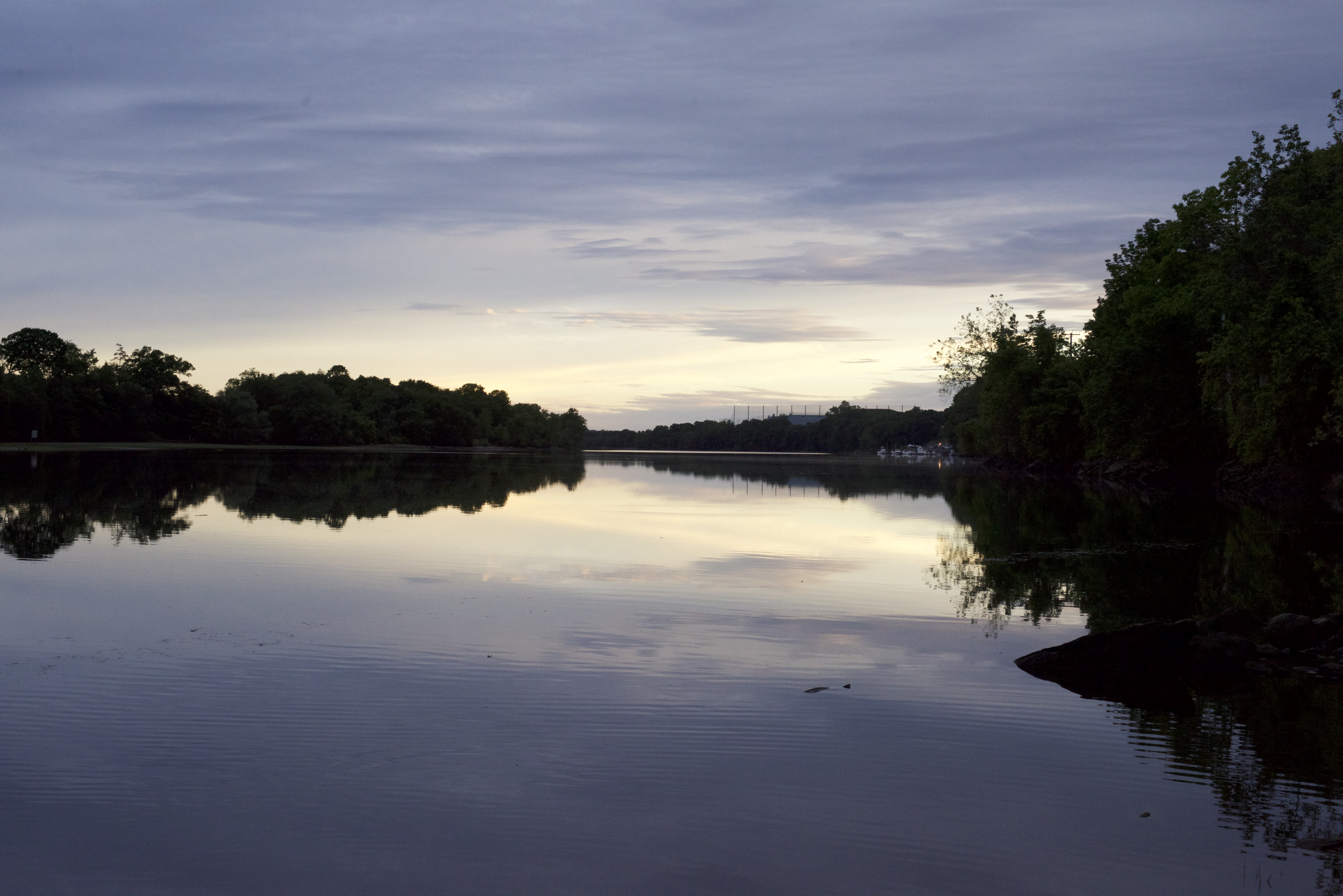
Housatonic river by Shelton at sunset.

One notable native was Chief Squantz of the Schaghticoke tribe, who still hold a portion of the former reservation on the west side of the Housatonic River, in what is now called the town of Kent.

English settlement of the northern Housatonic Valley began in 1725 in Sheffield, Massachusetts. By 1734, Mohicans established the Indian Town of Stockbridge, which grew over 15 years but then failed, with land pressures increasing.

=== Industrialization ===
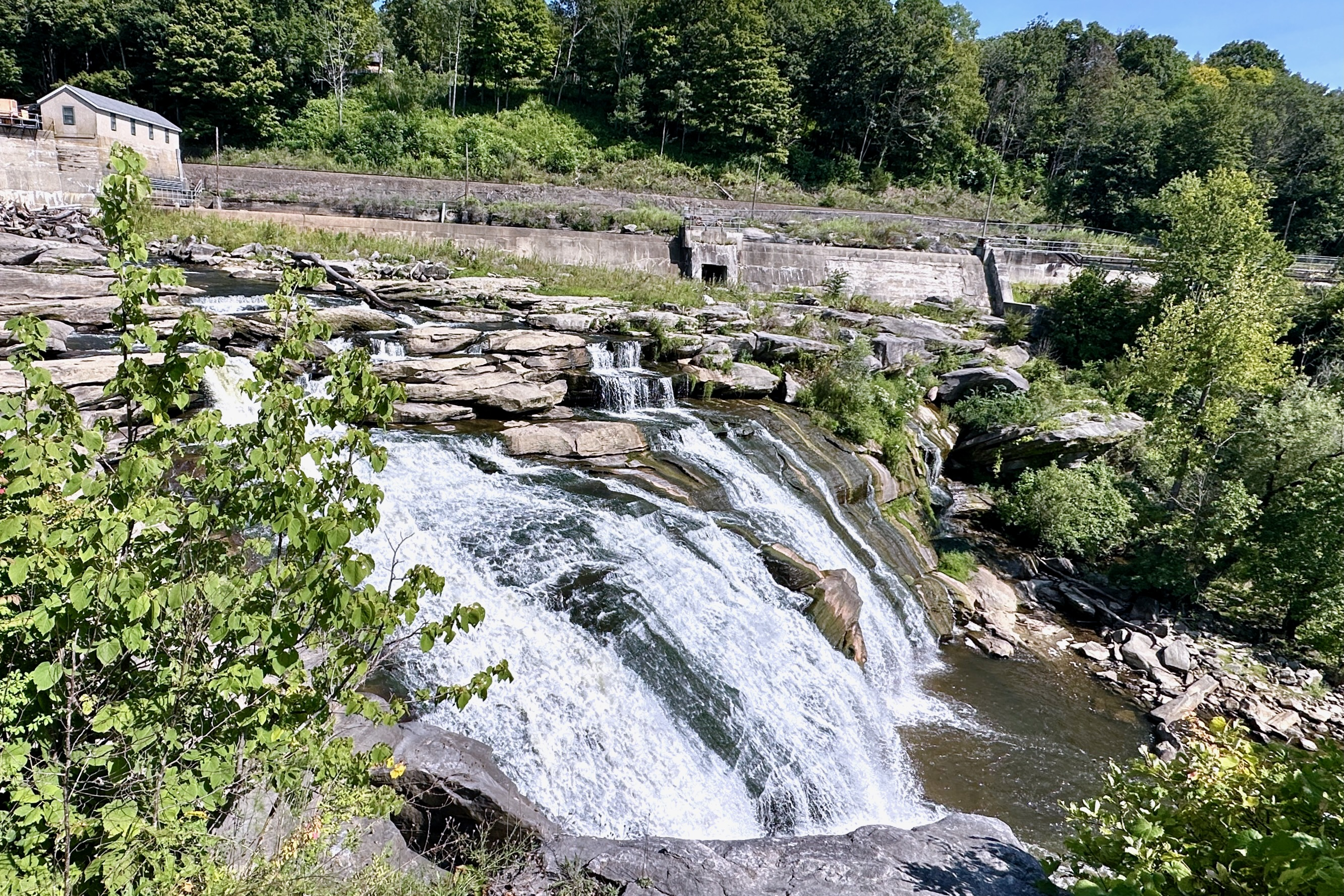
Great Falls of the Housatonic River below the Falls Village dam

The river has been a source of power for paper, iron, textiles, and electricity industries. At Great Barrington, a grist mill built by David Ingersoll in 1739 used the river for power. The paper industry grew using the river's power from circa 1800.

The river was dammed with the advent of industry. In 1900, there were 30 dams on the river in Pittsfield. Many have been removed, but many remain, such as the Woods Pond dam in Lenox, Columbia Mill dam in Lee, Willow Mill dam in South Lee, Glendale dam in Stockbridge, and Rising Pond dam in Great Barrington, Massachusetts.

Five dams impound the river in Connecticut to produce hydroelectricity: the Falls Village, Bulls Bridge, Shepaug, Stevenson and Derby dams. The last three dams form a chain of lakes: Lake Lillinonah, Lake Zoar and Lake Housatonic, from New Milford south to Shelton.

=== Covered wooden bridges ===
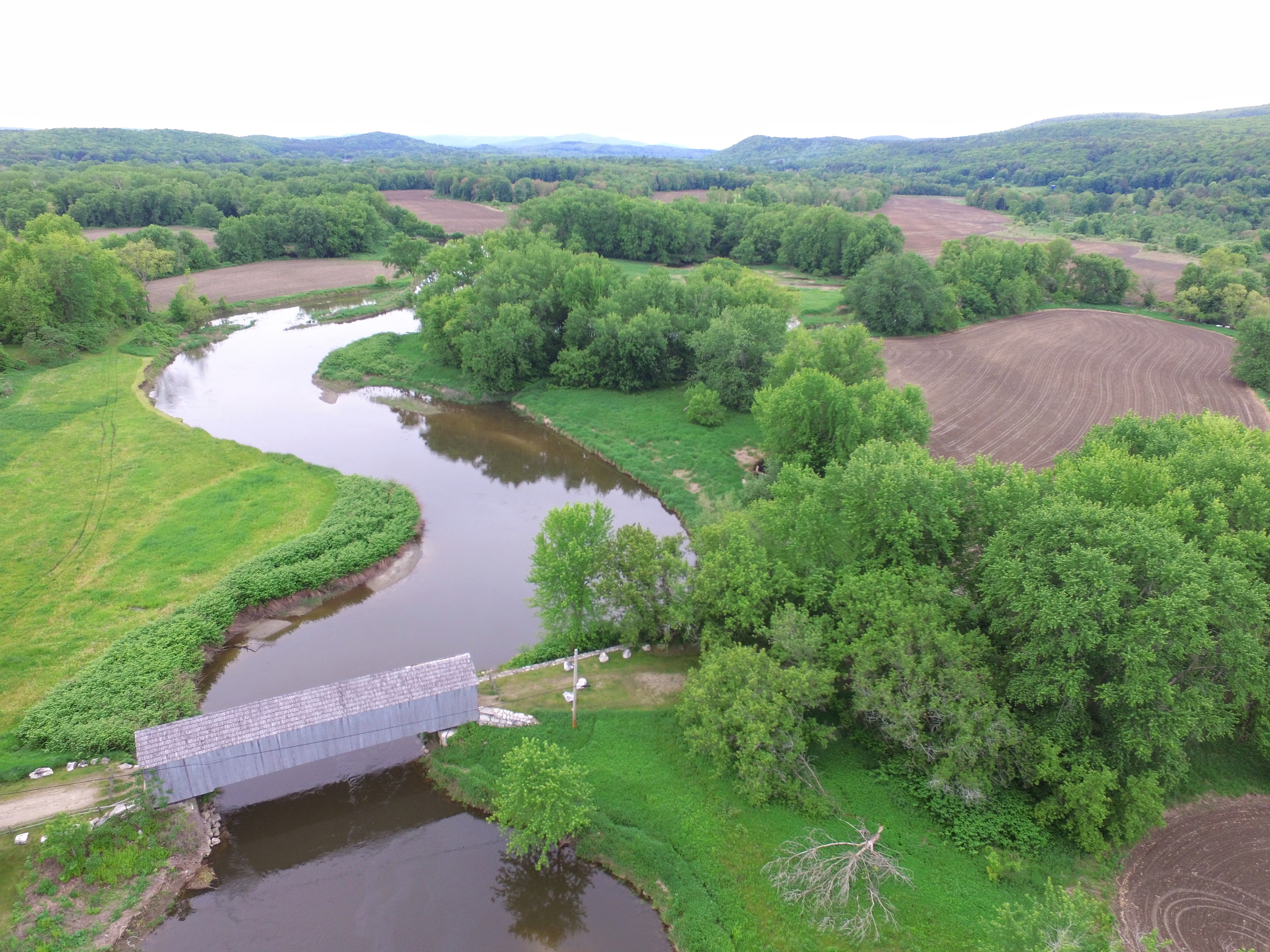
The Housatonic River at the Old Covered Bridge in Sheffield. The former Thom Reed UFO Monument Park is to the right of the bridge.

Three wooden covered bridges cross the Housatonic River. Two are in Connecticut: one known as Bull's Bridge, which spans the river between Gaylordsville and Kent, and another at Cornwall, known as the West Cornwall Covered Bridge. Reinforced with present-day materials, both bridges carry normal vehicle traffic, albeit in only one direction at a time. The third bridge, Old Covered Bridge located in Sheffield, Massachusetts, was destroyed by fire and rebuilt in 1998; it is now open only to foot traffic.

=== Cultural references ===
Lydia Sigourney's poem The Housatonic is in her volume, Scenes in my Native Land, 1845, where it accompanied by descriptive text on the river and its neighbourhood.

The United States Navy named a ship for the Housatonic River. The USS Housatonic has the distinction of being the first ship in history to be sunk by a submarine, the Confederate vessel CSS H.L. Hunley, in 1864.

Inspired by the river during his honeymoon, the American classical music composer Charles Ives wrote "The Housatonic at Stockbridge" as part of his composition Three Places in New England during the 1910s, drawing his text from a poem of the same name by Robert Underwood Johnson. The town of Stockbridge is located in southwestern Massachusetts. The river enters Stockbridge on the east side of town before turning south toward Connecticut.

There was a 1962 American nuclear weapon test of the same name; several such tests used Native American words as codewords.

==== UFO sighting and monument ====
In 1969, nine-year-old Thom Reed and his family claimed to see a bright light rise from the Housatonic River, then found themselves inside "what appeared to be an airplane hangar," where they saw creatures that "resembled large insects." Supporters of the family erected a memorial to the incident at the Old Covered Bridge in Sheffield, Massachusetts, in 2015. The 5,000-pound memorial was removed by the town in 2019. The incident featured in a 2020 episode of Unsolved Mysteries on Netflix.

== Ecology and wildlife ==
Historically, the Housatonic River and its Naugatuck River tributary hosted the southernmost spawning runs of the Atlantic salmon (Salmo salar). The Salmon Creek tributary of the Housatonic River may have been named for this salmonid, which can reach up to 30 pounds (14 kg).

=== Pollution ===
==== PCBs ====
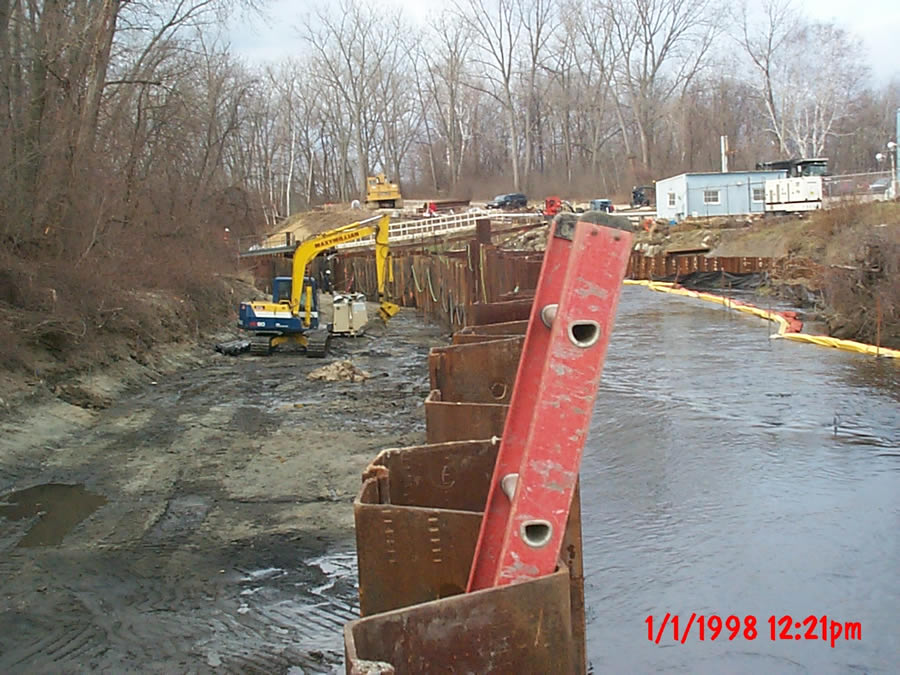
Cleanup activity at one of the GE Pittsfield plant Superfund sites.

From circa 1932 until 1977, the river received PCB pollution discharges from the General Electric (GE) plant at Pittsfield, Massachusetts. The U.S. Environmental Protection Agency (EPA) designated the Pittsfield plant and several miles of the Housatonic as a Superfund site in 1997, and ordered GE to remediate the site. EPA and GE began a cleanup of the area in 1999. Most of the PCBs used in the United States during this period were made by Monsanto. Aroclor 1254 and Aroclor 1260, made by Monsanto, was a primary contaminant of the pollution in the Housatonic River. Although the water quality has improved in recent decades, and some remediation has taken place, the river continues to be contaminated by PCBs.

Between 2005 and 2018 GE completed remediation and restoration of the 10 manufacturing plant areas within the city, and continues to conduct inspection, monitoring and maintenance activities. Additional remediation is planned for the downstream polluted areas of the river. The highest concentrations of PCBs in the Housatonic River are found in Woods Pond in Lenox, Massachusetts, just south of Pittsfield, where they have been measured up to 110 mg/kg in the sediment. About 50% of all the PCBs currently in the river are estimated to be retained in the sediment behind Woods Pond dam. This is estimated to be about 11,000 pounds of PCBs. Former filled oxbows are also polluted.

Birds, such as ducks, and fish that live in and around the river contain significant levels of PCBs and can present health risks if consumed. As of 2025 fish consumption advisories remain in effect for both the Massachusetts and Connecticut portions of the river.

"Rest of River" settlement agreement

Negotiations regarding how to clean up the contaminated areas south of Pittsfield continued for many years following the initial Superfund site designations, involving GE, EPA, local governments, citizen groups and other stakeholders. In February 2020 EPA announced a settlement agreement involving GE, EPA and most of the concerned parties, to remove contaminated sediment from the river. Following a public comment period, EPA issued a permit in December 2020 for the final cleanup phase. In 2021 two of the citizen groups that were parties to the settlement filed an appeal of the permit, criticizing the design of the planned landfill. In February 2022 the US Environmental Appeals Board (EAB) denied the permit appeal. Two citizen groups appealed the EAB decision to the First Circuit Court of Appeals, and in July 2023 the court rejected the plaintiffs' challenge.

In March 2025 EPA issued a conditional approval for GE's proposed disposal facility for low-level contaminated materials in the Town of Lee. As of 2026 the disposal facility in Lee is under construction. Highly contaminated soil will be removed and shipped to federally approved facilities outside the state.

==== Mercury ====
The Connecticut segment of the river is polluted with mercury levels far beyond background levels, starting at the confluence with the Still River. The hat manufacturing industry of Danbury, Connecticut, which operated from the 19th to the mid-20th century, was the source of most of this mercury pollution, from mercury nitrate used in the felting process. In the 21st century, the mercury remains in the river sediment and flows downstream, especially during storm events. High mercury levels are measured in the sediment at the outflow delta of the Housatonic River into Long Island Sound.

== Watershed and course ==
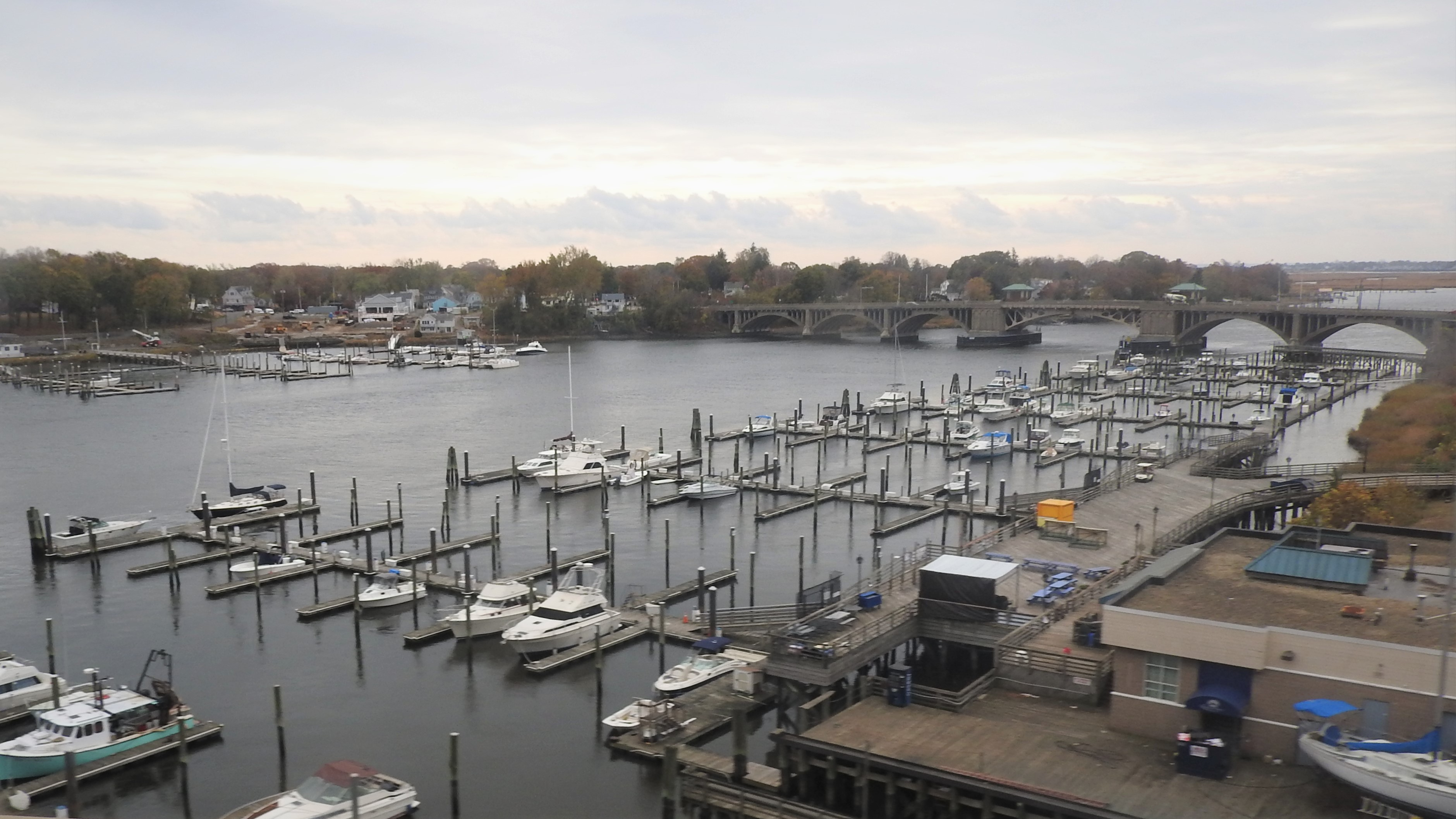
Boardwalk Marina in Stratford

The Housatonic River watershed drains 1,948 square miles (5,050 km^{2}) in western Connecticut and Massachusetts and eastern New York. The Housatonic rises from four sources in far western Massachusetts in the Berkshire Mountains near the city of Pittsfield. It flows southward through western Massachusetts through the Berkshires and into western Connecticut, and empties into the Long Island Sound between the cities of Stratford and Milford, forming a border between Connecticut's Fairfield County and New Haven County, respectively. It includes 83 towns.

For most of its extent the watershed is just to the west of the watershed of the lower Connecticut River, and to the east of the Hudson River Basin. Near the coast, smaller watersheds border it: on the east the Quinnipiac River and Wepawaug River watersheds, and on the west the Norwalk River, Saugatuck River, and Pequonnock River watersheds.

The river's total fall is 1,430 feet (440 m) (959 feet (292 m) from the confluence of its east and west branches) to Long Island Sound. Its major tributaries in Massachusetts are (heading downstream) the Williams River in Great Barrington), Green River and Konkapot River (in Ashley Falls). Crossing south into Connecticut, the Housatonic's major tributaries are the Blackberry River (in Canaan), Salmon Creek (below Falls Village), Ten Mile River (above Gaylordsville but originating in New York), Still River (south of New Milford), Shepaug River (at the Bridgewater and Southbury border), Pomperaug River (at Southbury), and Naugatuck River (in Derby). The Naugatuck River is the Housatonic's largest tributary with a contributing watershed of 312 square miles (810 km^{2}).

Candlewood Lake is a pumped storage facility which is replenished when water is pumped into it from the Housatonic during times of non-peak electrical consumption; the water is then allowed to flow back into the river during peak times to generate electricity.

== Housatonic Valley region ==
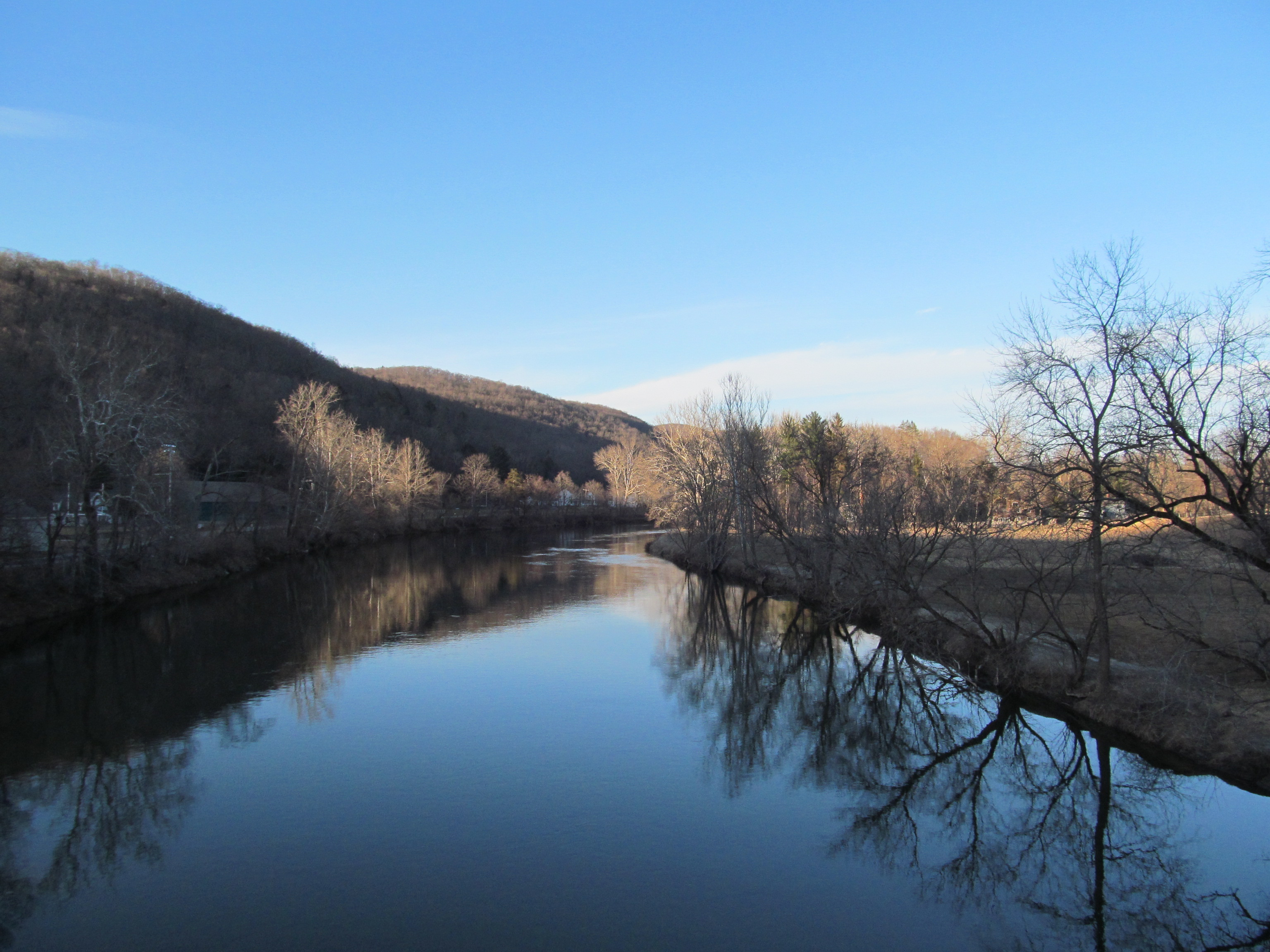
Housatonic River in Kent, Connecticut

The Greater Danbury metropolitan area in Western Connecticut is also known as the Housatonic Valley Region.

The Upper Housatonic Valley National Heritage Area is a designated National Heritage Area consisting of an 848-square-mile (2,200 km^{2}) area in the watershed of the upper Housatonic River, extending from Kent, Connecticut, to Lanesborough, Massachusetts, including eight towns in Connecticut and eighteen in Massachusetts.

== Recreation ==
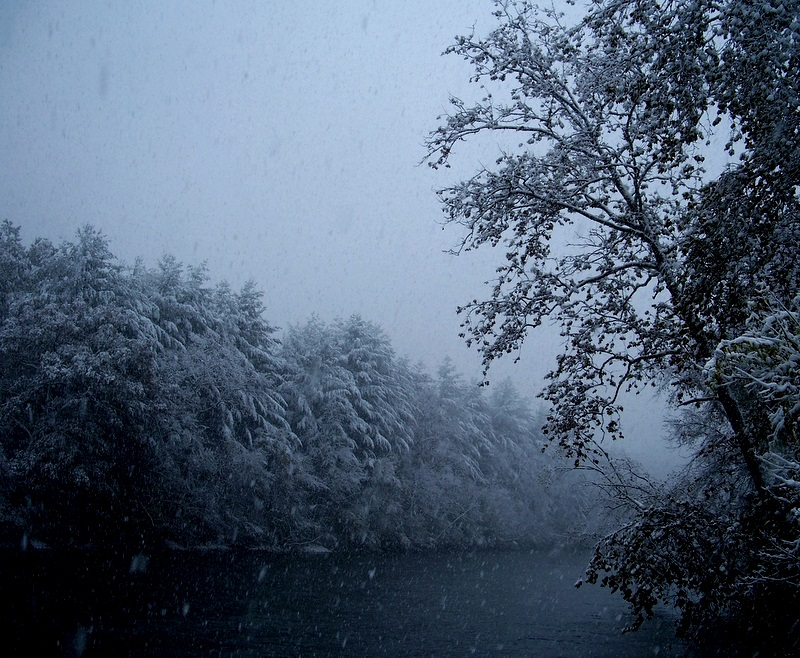
View of the "fly fishing and paddling" section of the river during a snowstorm.

The Housatonic River is a popular whitewater paddling destination beginning at Falls Village, Connecticut, and continuing to Gaylordsville. Most of the river is quickwater and Class I whitewater with long sections of Class II-III whitewater. A deadly and extreme Class VI resides at Great Falls in Canaan (Falls Village) and is most likely not able to be paddled. The most dangerous and difficult section that is navigable is by Bulls Bridge, with Class V whitewater.

There are several minor and major dams along the river that form lakes. Most notable are two lakes in Connecticut, Lake Zoar, which borders Monroe, Newtown, Oxford, and Southbury, and Lake Lillinonah. Both lakes are major water-sport recreation outlets for the surrounding towns.

Two of the three lakes formed by the dams are used for rowing by clubs, schools, and to host regattas. Lake Lillinonah is used by the GMS Rowing Center and is host to the GMS Regatta. Lake Housatonic is used by the Yale University Crew Team at the Gilder Boathouse and by the New Haven Rowing Club. It is also host to the Derby Sweeps & Sculls and the Head of the Housatonic.

The Housatonic River is also a popular fly fishing destination. Fly fishing on the Housatonic River has been compared with western rivers and is among the finest for trout in the eastern United States. The most popular area for fly fishing is in Litchfield County, Connecticut, between the dam at Falls Village and Cornwall Bridge. The sections between Kent School and Bulls Bridge are also known for quality fly fishing. The area below Bulls Bridge thru Gaylordsville and the power plant in New Milford is dangerous and not recommended for swimming or entering the water as the currents are quite strong. Fish consumption advisories remain in effect for the Housatonic River in Connecticut as of 2025.

The Appalachian Trail follows the river along this section from the Bulls Bridge covered wooden bridge near Kent to Falls Village.

== Major crossings ==
As U.S. Route 7 runs along the Housatonic River Valley between Pittsfield and New Milford, it crosses the Housatonic several times.

State	County	Carrying
MA	Berkshire	US 20 in Lee
MA	Berkshire	I-90 in Lee
MA	Berkshire	Route 102 in Lee
MA	Berkshire	US 7 in Stockbridge
MA	Berkshire	Route 183 in Housatonic
MA	Berkshire	US 7 in Great Barrington
MA	Berkshire	US 7 in Ashley Falls
MA	Berkshire	Route 7A in Ashley Falls
CT	Litchfield	US 44 in North Canaan
CT	Litchfield	US 7 in Falls Village
CT	Litchfield	Route 128 in West Cornwall (West Cornwall Covered Bridge)
CT	Litchfield	US 7/Route 4 in Cornwall Bridge
CT	Litchfield	Route 341 in Kent
CT	Litchfield	Bulls Bridge Road in South Kent (Bull's Bridge)
CT	Litchfield	US 7 in Gaylordsville
CT	Litchfield	US 202 in New Milford
CT	Litchfield/ Fairfield Line	Route 133 in Brookfield
CT	Fairfield/ New Haven Line	I-84/ US 6 in Southbury
CT	Fairfield/ New Haven Line	Route 34 at Lake Zoar (Stevenson Dam Bridge, Stevenson Dam)
CT	Fairfield/ New Haven Line	(Lake Housatonic Dam)
CT	Fairfield/ New Haven Line	State Road 712 (Derby–Shelton Bridge)
CT	Fairfield/ New Haven Line	CSX/Housatonic Railroad bridge
CT	Fairfield/ New Haven Line	Route 8 in Shelton/Derby (Commodore Isaac Hull Memorial Bridge)
CT	Fairfield/ New Haven Line	Route 15/ Merritt Parkway in Milford/Stratford
CT	Fairfield/ New Haven Line	US 1 in Milford/Stratford
CT	Fairfield/ New Haven Line	I-95 CT Turnpike in Milford/Stratford

== See also ==
- List of Connecticut rivers
- List of Massachusetts rivers
