= Comstock's Bridge =

- U.S. National Register of Historic Places
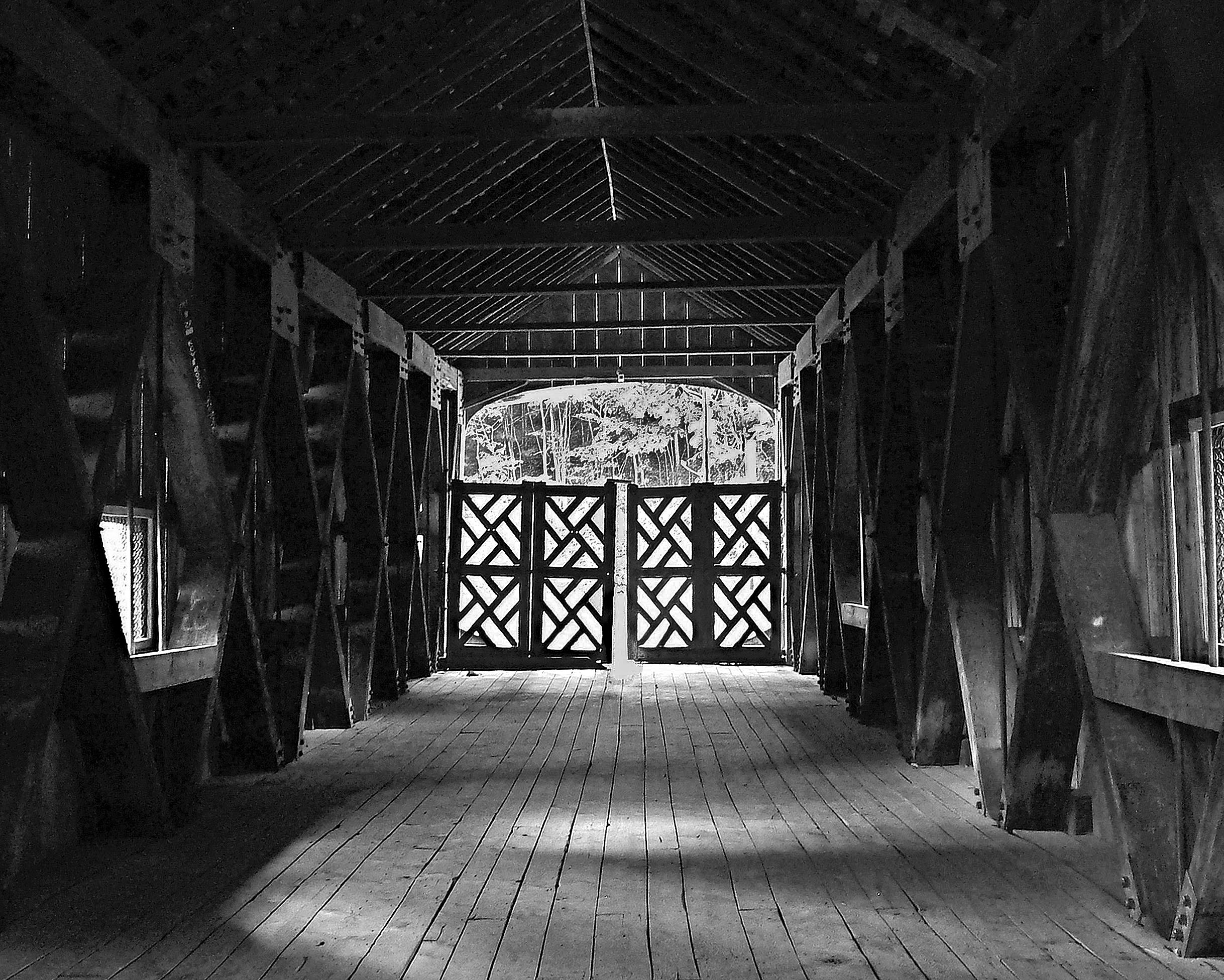

- Location within Connecticut Location within the United States
- Location: Comstock Bridge Road, East Hampton, Connecticut
- Coordinates: 41°33′11″N 72°26′57″W
- Area: 1 acre (0.40 ha)
- Built: 1873
- Architectural style: Howe truss covered bridge
- NRHP reference No.: 76001978
- Added to NRHP: January 1, 1976

Comstock's Bridge, also known as the Comstock Covered Bridge, is a covered bridge in Connecticut, connecting the town of East Hampton to the town of Colchester, spanning the Salmon River. First built in 1840, but entirely replaced in 1873, it is one of only three historical covered bridges in the state. It is open to pedestrian traffic in a small park off Comstock Bridge Road. The bridge was listed on the National Register of Historic Places on January 1, 1976.

== Description and history ==
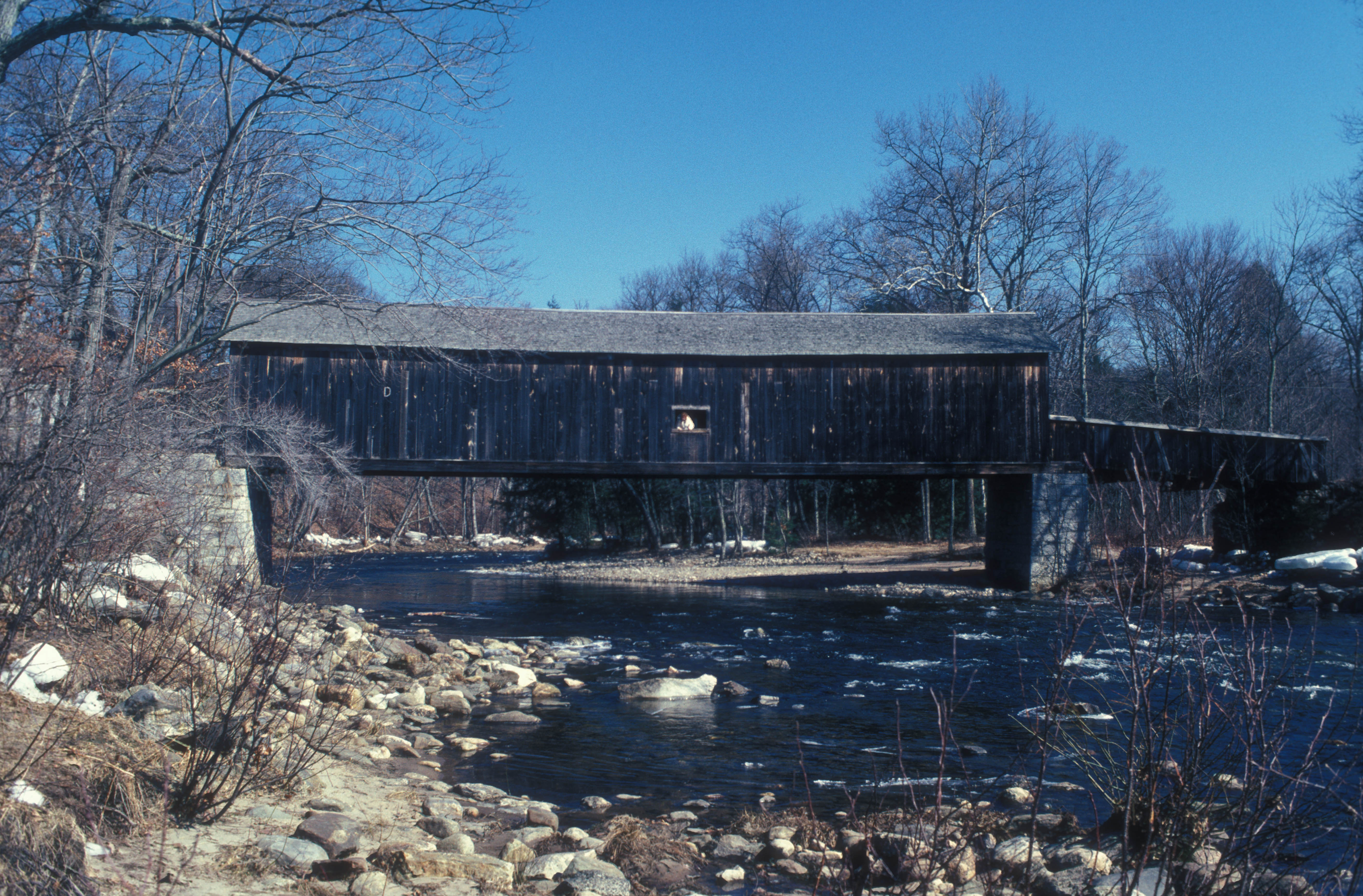
Comstock's Bridge in 1970

Comstock's Bridge is located in southeastern East Hampton, near the junction of Comstock Bridge Road and Colchester Avenue (Connecticut Route 16). The bridge consists of two spans: its main span is a Howe truss, 80 feet (24 m) long, with a roadbed 12 feet (3.7 m) wide. That span is covered by a gabled roof and sheathed in vertical board siding. Gates at either end of the bridge limit access to pedestrians. A secondary span, 30 feet (9.1 m) in length, connects the bridge to the eastern shore. This span is uncovered; its trusses are sheathed in vertical siding with peaked caps. The bridge abutments are a combination of unmortared rubblestone and cut granite.

The bridge was built in 1840. The bridge suffered major damage in the 1920s when a truck crashed through the floor. It underwent major restoration work in the 1930s by a Civilian Conservation Corps crew, which replaced some bridge materials with parts in part recycled from old buildings, and added the gates at either end. It is now closed to traffic, and is accessible from a small public park.

== See also ==
- List of bridges on the National Register of Historic Places in Connecticut
- List of covered bridges in Connecticut
- National Register of Historic Places listings in Middlesex County, Connecticut
