= List of turnpikes in Connecticut =

This is a list of turnpikes built and operated by private companies or non-profit turnpike trusts in the U.S. state of Connecticut, mainly in the 19th century. While most of the roads are still maintained as free public roads, some have been abandoned.

== List ==
Name	Chartered	Routing	Approximate modern designation	Notes
Mohegan Road	May 1792	New London - Uncasville - Norwich	Route 32	First toll road in New England and second in the country (the first was the road over Snicker's Gap, Virginia, chartered in 1785)
Greenwich Road	October 1792	Boston Post Road in Greenwich	U.S. Route 1	Became part of the Connecticut Turnpike in 1806
New London and Windham County Turnpike	May 1795	Norwich - Jewett City - Plainfield - Oneco - Rhode Island (Providence and Norwich Turnpike)	Route 12, Route 14A	
Oxford Turnpike	May 1795	Southbury - Oxford - Seymour	Route 67	
Hartford, New London, Windham and Tolland County Turnpike	October 1795	Manchester - Bolton - Andover - Columbia - Lebanon - Yantic	Route 85, Bolton Center Road, U.S. Route 6, Route 87	
Norwalk and Danbury Turnpike	October 1795	Wilton - Georgetown - Bethel	U.S. Route 7 - Route 107, Umpawaug Road, Route 53	
Fairfield, Weston and Reading Turnpike	May 1797	Bethel - Redding Ridge - Easton	Sunset Hill Road, Route 58	
Straits Turnpike	October 1797	New Haven - Naugatuck - Watertown - Litchfield	Route 69, Litchfield Turnpike, Route 63	
New Milford and Litchfield Turnpike	October 1797	New Milford - New Preston - Bantam	U.S. Route 202	
Boston Turnpike	October 1797	East Hartford - Manchester - Mansfield - Ashford - Pomfret - Thompson - Massachusetts (Ninth Massachusetts Turnpike)	U.S. Route 44, Route 244, Freedley Road, West Thompson Road, Route 193, East Thompson Road	
Talcott Mountain Turnpike	May 1798	Hartford - Avon - Canton - New Hartford	U.S. Route 44	
Ousatonic Turnpike	May 1798	New Milford - Lakeside - Derby	Much of the road has been destroyed by the Shepaug Dam and Stevenson Dam; the rest is Grove Street, River Road, and Route 34	Portion north of the Stevenson Dam operated as the River Turnpike between 1834 and 1841
Derby Turnpike	May 1798	New Haven - Derby	Route 34	Last turnpike in Connecticut (stopped collecting tolls in 1895)
Greenwoods Turnpike	October 1798	New Hartford - Winsted - Norfolk - Massachusetts (Twelfth Massachusetts Turnpike)	U.S. Route 44, Old Turnpike Road	
Hartford and New Haven Turnpike	October 1798	New Haven - Meriden - Berlin - Hartford	Hartford Turnpike, Route 150, U.S. Route 5, Maple Avenue	
Litchfield and Harwinton Turnpike	October 1798	Litchfield - Harwinton - Burlington	Route 118, Route 4	
Windham Turnpike	May 1799	North Coventry - Coventry - Willimantic - Windham - Scotland - Canterbury - Plainfield	Route 31, Route 32, Plains Road, Route 14, Route 14A	
Canaan and Litchfield Turnpike	May 1799	Litchfield - Goshen - Canaan	Route 63, U.S. Route 7	
Farmington River Turnpike	May 1800	New Hartford - Riverton - Massachusetts (Tenth Massachusetts Turnpike)	Route 181, East River Road, Hogback Road, and a road buried by Colebrook River Lake	
Windham and Mansfield Turnpike	May 1800	Yantic - Franklin - Windham - Mansfield - Storrs - Stafford - Massachusetts (Petersham and Monson Turnpike)	Route 32, Manning Bridge Road, Jerusalem Road, Route 203, Tuckie Road, Route 195, Route 320, Lohse Road, Stafford Street, Goodell Road, Old Monson Road, Route 32	Part of the road operated by the Stafford Pool Turnpike, later the Stafford Mineral Spring Turnpike, after 1813
Cheshire Turnpike	May 1800	New Haven - Whitneyville - Hamden - Cheshire - Southington - Plainville	Whitney Avenue, Route 10	
Granby Turnpike	October 1800	Massachusetts - Granby - Tariffville - Hartford	Route 189	
Hartford and New London Turnpike	October 1800	East Hartford - Glastonbury - Marlborough - Colchester - Salem - New London	Route 2, Route 85	
Farmington and Bristol Turnpike	May 1801	Burlington - Farmington - West Hartford - Hartford	George Washington Turnpike, Red Oak Hill Road, Route 10, Route 4, Farmington Avenue	
Danbury and Ridgefield Turnpike	May 1801	Danbury - Ridgefield	U.S. Route 7, Route 35	
Torrington Turnpike	May 1801	Litchfield - Torrington - Canton - West Simsbury	U.S. Route 202, Town Bridge Road, Simonds Avenue, Lawton Road, West Mountain Road	
Norwich and Woodstock Turnpike	May 1801	Norwich - Canterbury - Brooklyn - Pomfret - Woodstock - Fabyan - Massachusetts; South Woodstock - North Woodstock - Massachusetts	Canterbury Turnpike, Paper Mill Road, Kinsman Hill Road, Route 169, Roseland Park Road, Paine District Road, Fabyan Road; Route 169	
Salisbury and Canaan Turnpike	October 1801	Huntsville - Falls Village - Lakeville - New York (Ulster and Delaware Turnpike)	Route 126, Falls Mountain Road, Farnum Road, U.S. Route 44	
Bridgeport and Newtown Turnpike	October 1801	Bridgeport - Trumbull - Botsford - Newtown - Brookfield	Route 111, Route 25, Currituck Road, Route 25	
Waterbury River Turnpike	October 1801	Naugatuck - Waterbury - Thomaston - Torrington - Winchester - Colebrook - Massachusetts (Fifteenth Massachusetts Turnpike)	Route 8, Newfield Road, Waterbury Turnpike, Millbrook Road, Route 183	
Hartford and Tolland Turnpike	October 1801	East Hartford - Vernon - Tolland	Tolland Turnpike, Route 30, Route 74	
Pomfret and Killingly Turnpike	May 1802	Pomfret - Putnam - Rhode Island (West Glocester Turnpike)	U.S. Route 44, Mantup Road, Hurry Hill Road, Chase Road (portions across the Quinebaug River and east of Putnam Heights no longer exist)	
Hebron and Middle Haddam Turnpike	May 1802	Hebron - Marlborough - East Hampton - Middle Haddam	Route 66	
Middlesex Turnpike	May 1802	Rocky Hill - Cromwell - Middletown - Higganum - Haddam - Deep River - Old Saybrook	Route 99, Route 9, Route 154	
New Preston Turnpike	May 1802	New Preston - South Kent - New York	New Preston Hill Road, Cherniske Road, Barker Road, Meetinghouse Road, Camp Flats Road, Bulls Bridge Road	
New Haven and Milford Turnpike	May 1802	New Haven - Milford	U.S. Route 1	
Rimmon Falls Turnpike	May 1803	Seymour - New Haven	Route 313, Route 243	
Goshen and Sharon Turnpike	May 1803	Torrington - Goshen - West Cornwall - Sharon - New York (Dutchess Turnpike)	Route 4, Route 128, Cornwall Road, Fairchild Road, Route 343	
Stafford Pool Turnpike (Stafford Mineral Spring Turnpike after 1814)	October 1803	Tolland - Stafford Springs - Staffordville - Massachusetts (Worcester and Stafford Turnpike)	Old Stafford Road, Route 190, Stafford Street, New City Road	Operated part of the Windham and Mansfield Turnpike after 1813
Washington Turnpike	October 1803	Woodbury - Washington - New Preston	Route 47, Baldwin Hill Road	
Thompson Turnpike	October 1803	Rhode Island (West Glocester Turnpike) - Thompson - Quinebaug - Massachusetts	Elmwood Hill Road, Quaddick Road, Route 200, Buckley Hill Road, Route 131	
Middle Road Turnpike	October 1803	Farmington - Bristol - Terryville - Plymouth - Thomaston - Watertown - Woodbury - Southbury - Newtown - Danbury	U.S. Route 6, Hamilton Avenue, Middle Road Turnpike, U.S. Route 6, Main Street South, Riverside Road, Church Hill Road, U.S. Route 6, Old Bethel Road, Walnut Hill Road, Shelter Rock Road	Split into the East Middle Turnpike and West Middle Turnpike at Woodbury in 1823
Colchester and Norwich Turnpike	October 1805	Colchester - Gilman - Yantic	Route 2	
Cornwall and Washington Turnpike	October 1805	Lower City - Cornwall - Romford - Woodbury	Route 43, Great Hollow Road (partly abandoned in Cornwall and partly covered by the Upper Shepaug Reservoir and Shepaug Reservoir), Valley Road, Romford Road, Nettleton Hollow Road	
Connecticut Turnpike	May 1806	Fairfield - Southport - Westport - Norwalk - Darien - Stamford - Greenwich - New York (Westchester Turnpike)	U.S. Route 1	Included the Greenwich Road (1792)
Connecticut and Rhode Island Turnpike	May 1806	Rhode Island (Rhode Island and Connecticut Turnpike) - Killingly - Abington - Ashford	Route 101	
Hartland Turnpike	May 1806	Norfolk - Hartland - North Granby - Suffield	Route 182, Old North Road, Deer Hill Road, Robertsville Road, Route 20, Walnut Hill Road (cut by the Barkhamsted Reservoir), Mountain Road, East Street, Quarry Road, Phelps Road, Route 168, Bridge Street	
Warren Turnpike	May 1806	Falls Village - West Cornwall - Cornwall Bridge - Warren - New Preston	Warren Turnpike, Lime Rock Station Road, Lower River Road, abandoned road on the east side of the Housatonic River, U.S. Route 7, Route 45	
New London and Lyme Turnpike	May 1807	New London - Waterford - East Lyme - Old Lyme	U.S. Route 1	
Woodstock and Thompson Turnpike	May 1808	Woodstock - Thompson	Child Hill Road, Bull Hill Road, (abandoned portion), Blain Road, Route 200	
Middletown and Berlin Turnpike	May 1808	Middletown - Berlin - Kensington - Plainville	Route 3, Route 372	
Woodstock and Somers Turnpike	October 1808	Woodstock - North Ashford - Orcutts - Somers	Pulpit Rock Road, Route 171, Lyon Road, Reich Road, abandoned portion, Hillside Road, Route 190, Collette Road, Route 319, Route 190	
Colchester and Chatham Turnpike	October 1808	Colchester - Cobalt - Portland	Route 16, Route 66	
Columbia Turnpike	October 1808	Willimantic - Columbia - Hebron	Pleasant Street, Old Willimantic Road, Route 66	
Tolland County Turnpike	May 1809	Ellington - Tolland - Willington - West Ashford	Snipsic Lake Road, Hurlbut Road, Doyle Road, Route 74	
Sharon and Cornwall Turnpike	May 1809	Calhoun Corners - Sharon	Swifts Bridge Road, Guinea Road, Route 4, Mitcheltown Road, Route 41	
Chatham and Marlborough Turnpike	October 1809	Marlborough - Portland	Portland Road, Old Marlborough Turnpike, Route 17A	
Middletown and Meriden Turnpike	October 1809	Middletown - Meriden	Route 66	
East Haddam and Colchester Turnpike	October 1809	Colchester - East Haddam	Taintor Hill Road, School Road, Clark Road, East Haddam Colchester Turnpike, Orchard Road, Route 149	
Durham and East Guilford Turnpike	May 1811	Durham - Madison	Pisgah Road, Crooked Hill Road, Route 79	
Southington and Waterbury Turnpike	October 1812	Meriden - Milldale - Waterbury	Main Street, Route 322, Meriden Road	
Killingworth and Haddam Turnpike	October 1813	Higganum - West Haddam - Killingworth - Clinton; West Haddam - Haddam	Route 81; Beaver Meadow Road	
Middletown, Durham and New Haven Turnpike	October 1813	Middletown - Durham - Northford - New Haven	Route 17	
Litchfield and Cornwall Turnpike	October 1814	Litchfield - Cornwall	Milton Road, Seeley Road, College Street	
Haddam and Durham Turnpike	May 1815	Higganum - Durham	Candlewood Hill Road, Higganum Road	
Still River Turnpike	May 1815	Torrington - Winsted - Colebrook	Route 8	
Chester and North Killingworth Turnpike	May 1816	Chester - Killingworth	Route 148	
New Milford and Sherman Turnpike	May 1818	New Milford - Sherman - New York	Housatonic Avenue, Boardman Road, Route 37, Briggs Hill Road	
Pettipauge and Guilford Turnpike	October 1818	Essex - Killingworth - Guilford	Main Street, Route 80, Madison Turnpike, Green Hill Road	
Groton and Stonington Turnpike	October 1818	Groton - Old Mystic - Rhode Island (Hopkinton and Richmond Turnpike)	Route 184	
Essex Turnpike	May 1822	Essex - Laysville	Elys Ferry Road, Town Woods Road	
East Middle Turnpike	May 1823	See Middle Road Turnpike (1803)		
West Middle Turnpike	May 1823	See Middle Road Turnpike (1803)		
Salem and Hamburg Turnpike	May 1824	Salem - Lyme	Route 82, Darling Road, Route 156, Cove Road	
Pines Bridge Turnpike	May 1824	Pines Bridge - Middlebury - Woodbury	Route 42, Old Litchfield Turnpike, Chestnut Tree Hill Road, Long Meadow Road, Tranquility Road, Quassapaug Road	
Guilford and Durham Turnpike	May 1824	Durham - Guilford	Route 77	
Fairhaven Turnpike	May 1824	Killingworth - North Branford - Fair Haven	Route 80, Quinnipiac Avenue	
Providence Turnpike	May 1825	Danielson - Rhode Island (Foster and Scituate Turnpike)	U.S. Route 6	
Sandy Brook Turnpike	May 1825	North Colebrook - Riverton	Sandy Brook Road, Riverton Road	
Humphreysville and Salem Turnpike	May 1825	Naugatuck - Beacon Falls - Seymour	Route 8	
Center Turnpike	May 1826	Massachusetts (Central Turnpike) - Quinebaug - North Woodstock - North Ashford - Westford - Tolland	Route 197, Old Turnpike Road, Centre Pike, Boston Hollow Road, Turnpike Road, Interstate 84, North River Road, Route 74	
Northfield Turnpike	May 1826	Redding - Weston	Route 53 (partly under the Saugatuck Reservoir)	
Windham and Brooklyn Turnpike	May 1826	Danielson - Brooklyn - Windham	U.S. Route 6, Windham Road, Brooklyn Turnpike	
Monroe and Zoar Bridge Turnpike	May 1826	Stevenson - Monroe - Trumbull	Route 111	
Norwich and Salem Turnpike	May 1827	Norwich - Salem	Route 82	
New Milford and Roxbury Turnpike	May 1827	New Milford - Roxbury	Route 67, Wellers Bridge Road	
Tolland and Mansfield Turnpike	May 1828	Massachusetts - North Somers - Tolland - Mansfield Four Corners	Route 83, Turnpike Road, Gulf Road, Burbank Road, Route 30, Peter Green Road, Route 195	
Huntington Turnpike	May 1828	Shelton - Huntington - Bridgeport	Route 108, Huntington Turnpike	
Weston Turnpike	May 1828			
Sugar Hollow Turnpike	May 1829	Georgetown - Branchville - Danbury - Mill Plain - New York	U.S. Route 7 (partly over the Danbury and Ridgefield Turnpike (1801)), Kenosia Avenue, Joes Hill Road	
Newtown and Norwalk Turnpike	May 1829	Newtown - Redding Ridge - Weston - Norwalk	Route 302, Poverty Hollow Road, Hopewell Road, Newtown Turnpike, Huckleberry Road (partly blocked by the Saugatuck Reservoir), Route 53, Newtown Turnpike	
Shetucket Turnpike	May 1829	Norwich - Preston - Voluntown - Rhode Island (unbuilt Providence and Norwich City Turnpike)	Route 165, Shetucket Turnpike	
Wells Hollow Turnpike	May 1830	Shelton - Nichols	Bridgeport Avenue, Shelton Turnpike	
Branch Turnpike	May 1831	Westport - Aspetuck - Easton - Upper Stepney - Bennetts Bridge	Route 136, Route 59, Pepper Street, Garder Road, High Rock Road, Grays Plain Road, Bennetts Bridge Road, road flooded by the Stevenson Dam	
Black Rock and Weston Turnpike	May 1832	Black Rock - Easton	Black Rock Turnpike, Route 58	
Simpaug Turnpike	May 1832	Topstone - West Redding	Simpaug Turnpike	
Monroe and Newtown Turnpike	May 1833	Upper Stepney - Dodgingtown	Hattertown Road	
Fairfield County Turnpike	May 1834	Easton - Dodgingtown - Brookfield	Valley Road, Poverty Hollow Road, Flat Swamp Road, Shelly Road, Old Hawleyville Road, Stony Hill Road	
Hadlyme Turnpike	May 1834	Hadlyme - Salem	Route 148, Route 82	
Chester and North Killingworth Second Turnpike	May 1834	Approach to the Hadlyme Ferry in Chester	Route 148	
Sherman and Redding Turnpike	May 1834	Redding - Bethel - Sherman	Sherman Turnpike, Route 107, Lonetown Road, Chestnut Ridge Road, Maple Avenue, Shelter Rock Road, Old Sherman Turnpike, abandoned portion, Old Turnpike Road, Candlewood Lake Road, large section under Lake Candlewood, Sawmill Road	
River Turnpike	May 1834	See Ousatonic Turnpike (1798)		
Madison and North Killingworth Turnpike	May 1835	Killingworth - North Madison	Route 148, Abner Lane, abandoned portion	
Hop River Turnpike	May 1835	Bolton Notch - Andover - Willimantic	U.S. Route 6, Route 66	
Waterbury and Cheshire Plank Road	1852	Waterbury - Cheshire	Plank Road	
Saugatuck Turnpike	October 1797	Unbuilt		
Stratfield and Weston Turnpike	October 1797	Bridgeport (Stratfield) - Easton		
Greenwich and Ridgefield Turnpike	May 1802	Unbuilt		
Farmington and Harwinton Turnpike	October 1812	Unbuilt		
Dragon Turnpike	October 1817	Unbuilt		
Granby and Barkhamsted Turnpike	May 1818	Unbuilt		
Wolcott and Hampden Turnpike	May 1818	Unbuilt		
Pleasant Valley Turnpike	May 1820	Unbuilt		
New Milford and Woodbury Turnpike	May 1823	Unbuilt		
Woodbridge and Waterbury Turnpike	May 1823	Unbuilt		
Wolcottsville Turnpike	May 1826	Unbuilt		
Zoar Bridge Turnpike	May 1826	Unbuilt		
Moosup Turnpike	May 1830	Unbuilt		
Kent and Warren Turnpike	May 1834	Unbuilt		
Litchfield and Plymouth Turnpike	May 1836	Unbuilt		
Millington Turnpike	May 1839	Unbuilt		
Danbury, Redding, Weston and Westport Plank Road	1851	Unbuilt		
Stamford, New Canaan and Ridgefield Plank Road	1851	Unbuilt		
New Haven and Seymour Plank Road	1852	Unbuilt		
Woodbury and Seymour Plank Road	1852	Unbuilt		
Wallingford, North Haven and New Haven Plank Road	1853	Unbuilt		
Salisbury Plank Road	1853	Unbuilt		

== Map ==
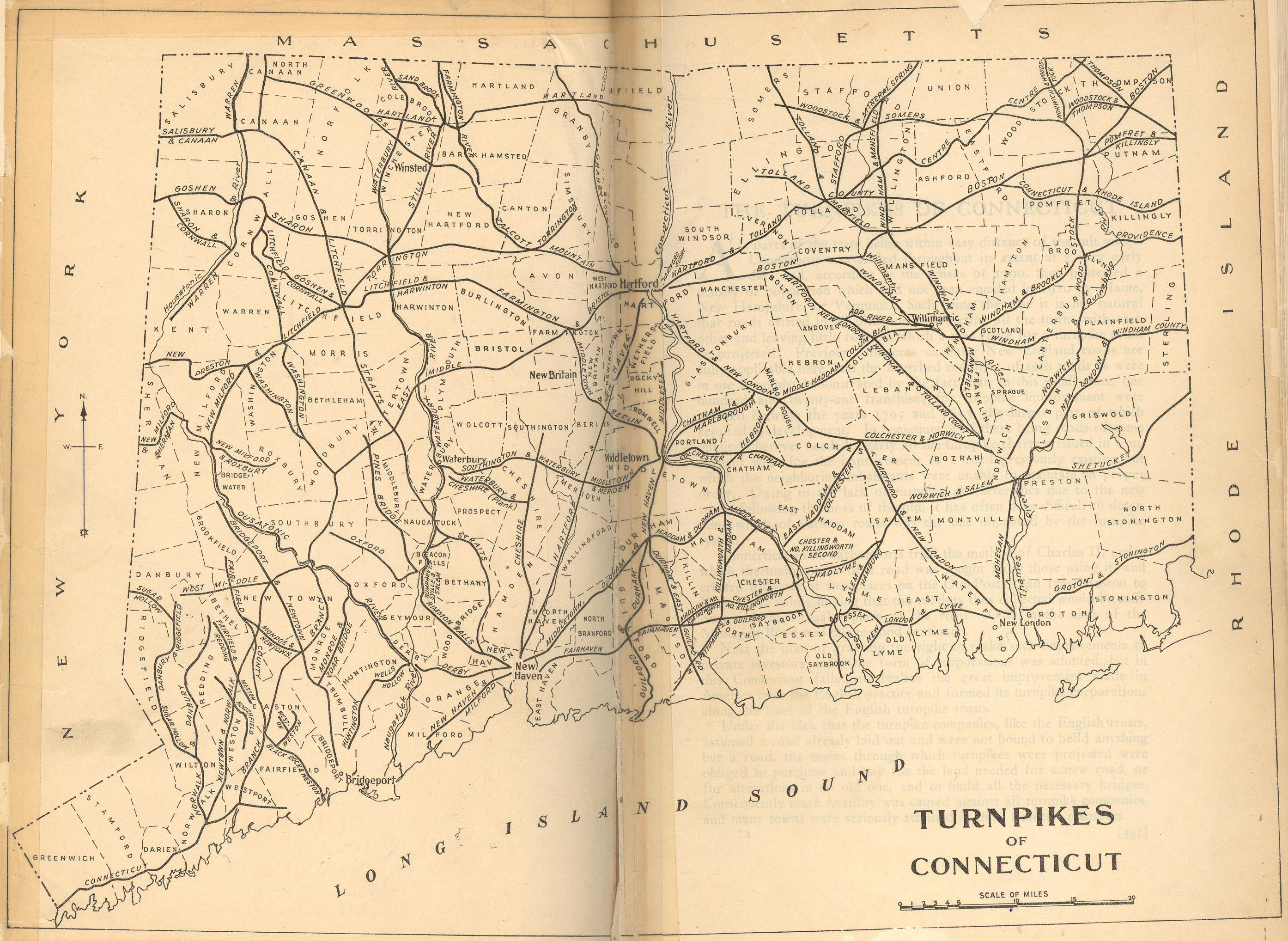
Map of 19th century toll roads in Connecticut
