= Connecticut Route 125 =

State highway in Litchfield County, Connecticut, US

Route 125
- Grange Hall Road
- Map of Litchfield County in northwestern Connecticut with Route 125 highlighted in red

Route information
- Maintained by CTDOT
- Length: 1.24 mi (2.00 km)
- Existed: 1932–present

Major junctions
- South end: Route 4 in Cornwall
- North end: Route 128 in Cornwall

Location
- Country: United States
- State: Connecticut
- Counties: Litchfield

Highway system
- Connecticut State Highway System; Interstate; US; State; SSR; SR; Scenic
← Route 124	→ Route 126

Route 125 is a minor state highway in northwestern Connecticut, running entirely within the town of Cornwall.

== Route description ==
Route 125 begins at an intersection with Route 4 in the town center of Cornwall and heads north for 1.2 miles (1.9 km) to end at an intersection with Route 128. Route 125 is known as Grange Hill Road and is a short connector between Route 4, which leads to the village of Cornwall Bridge, and Route 128, which leads to the village of West Cornwall. Route 125 is two lanes wide and is classified as a rural collector road for its entire length. It carries average volumes of only 500 vehicles per day.

== History ==
Route 125 was established from a previously unnumbered road in the 1932 state highway renumbering. It originally ran from Jewell Street, where the town offices of Cornwall are located, to its current northern terminus at Route 128. At an undetermined time after 1938, the southern terminus was truncated to its current location at Route 4. It was scheduled for cancellation in the 1962 Route Reclassification Act but it was ultimately decided to be retained in the state highway system.

== Junction list ==
The entire route is in Cornwall, Litchfield County.

mi	km	Destinations	Notes
0.00	0.00	Route 4 – Sharon, Goshen	Southern terminus
1.24	2.00	Route 128 – Cornwall, West Cornwall	Northern terminus
1.000 mi = 1.609 km; 1.000 km = 0.621 mi
