= Connecticut Route 128 =

State highway in Litchfield County, Connecticut, US

Route 128
- Map of Litchfield County in northwestern Connecticut with Route 128 highlighted in red

Route information
- Maintained by CTDOT
- Length: 4.03 mi (6.49 km)
- Existed: 1932–present

Major junctions
- West end: US 7 in Sharon
- East end: Route 4 / Route 43 in Cornwall

Location
- Country: United States
- State: Connecticut
- Counties: Litchfield

Highway system
- Connecticut State Highway System; Interstate; US; State; SSR; SR; Scenic
← Route 127	→ Route 130

Route 128 is a minor state highway in northwestern Connecticut, running from U.S. Route 7 in Sharon to Route 4 in Cornwall.

== Route description ==
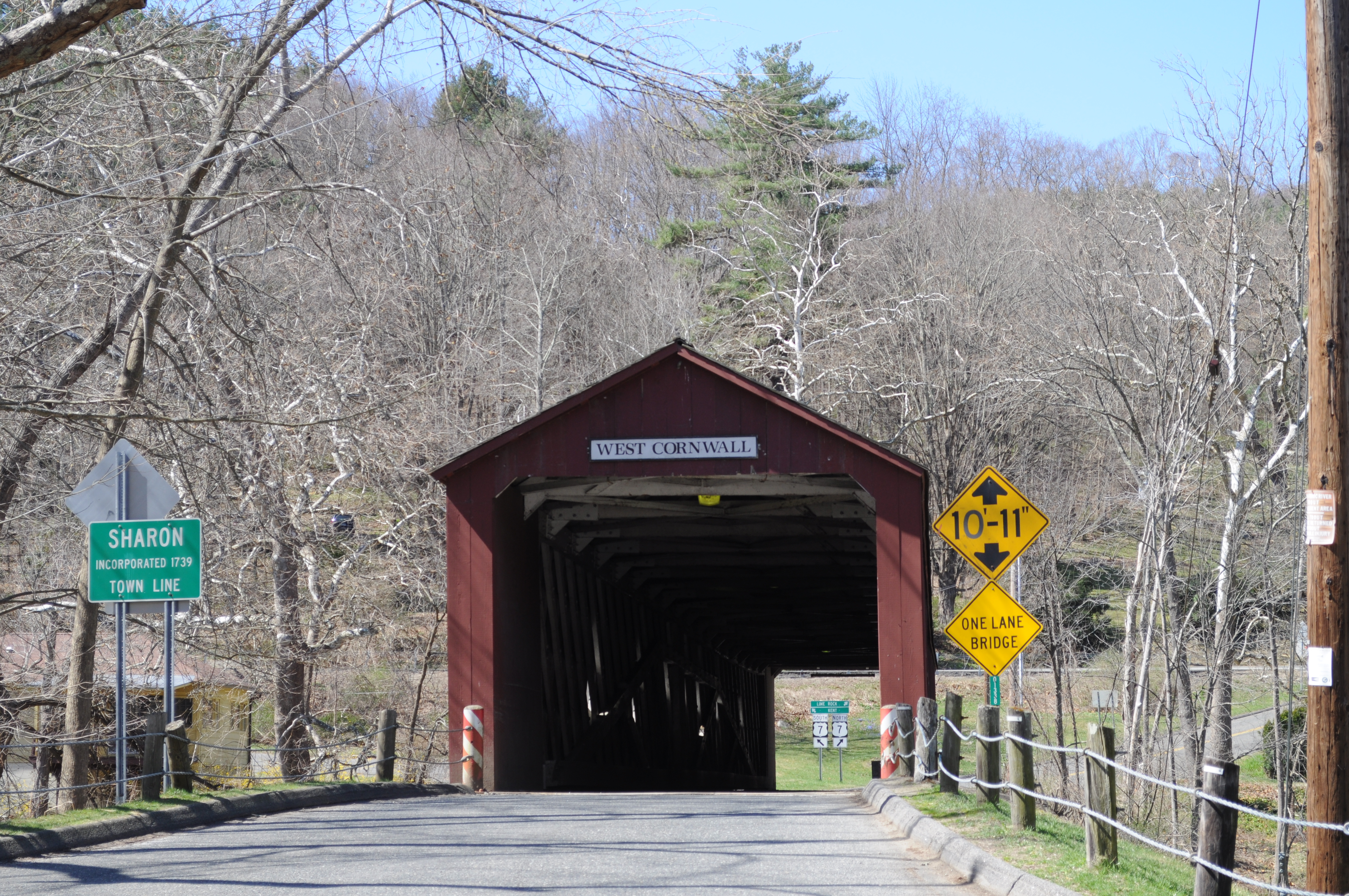
Looking through the West Cornwall Covered Bridge to the intersection of Route 128 with U.S. Route 7.

Route 128 begins at an intersection with U.S. Route 7 on the west bank of the Housatonic River within the town of Sharon. It heads east and immediately crosses the Housatonic River via the West Cornwall Covered Bridge (a wooden deck bridge) into the village of West Cornwall in the town of Cornwall. Route 128 then continues east for 1.8 miles (2.9 km), passing by a state highway picnic area, then turns south. About 0.6 miles (0.97 km) beyond the picnic area, Route 125 splits off to the south heading for Cornwall center. Route 128 continues southeast for another 1.5 miles (2.4 km) until it ends at an intersection with Route 4 and Route 43 in the village of Cornwall Hollow. In Cornwall, Route 128 is known as the Sharon-Goshen Turnpike. Route 128 is a two-lane rural collector road and carries daily traffic volumes of up to 1,900.

== History ==
The Goshen and Sharon Turnpike, a private toll road which connects Sharon center and Torrington center via West Cornwall, Cornwall Hollow and Goshen center, was chartered in May 1803. The turnpike used modern Route 4 between Torrington and Cornwall Hollow, then modern Route 128 from Cornwall Hollow to West Cornwall. Between Sharon and West Cornwall, the turnpike used West Cornwall Road.

In 1922, the portion of the old Goshen and Sharon Turnpike between West Cornwall and Cornwall Hollow, which had by now reverted to public control, was designated as a secondary state highway known as Highway 309. Route 128 was established from old Highway 309 as part of the 1932 state highway renumbering and remains unchanged since then.

== Junction list ==
The entire route is in Litchfield County.

Location	mi	km	Destinations	Notes
Sharon	0.00	0.00	US 7 – Canaan, Kent	Western terminus
Cornwall	2.50	4.02	Route 125 south – Cornwall Village	Northern terminus of Route 125
Cornwall	4.03	6.49	Route 4 / Route 43 north – Falls Village, Sharon, Goshen	Eastern terminus; southern terminus of Route 43
1.000 mi = 1.609 km; 1.000 km = 0.621 mi
