= Dudleytown, Connecticut =

- Former populated place
- Location within the state of Connecticut Dudleytown, Connecticut (the United States)
- Coordinates: 41.8078°N 73.3523°W
- Country: United States
- State: Connecticut
- County: Litchfield
- Time zone: UTC-5 (Eastern(EST))
  - Summer (DST): UTC-4 (EDT)
- GNIS feature ID: 1931925

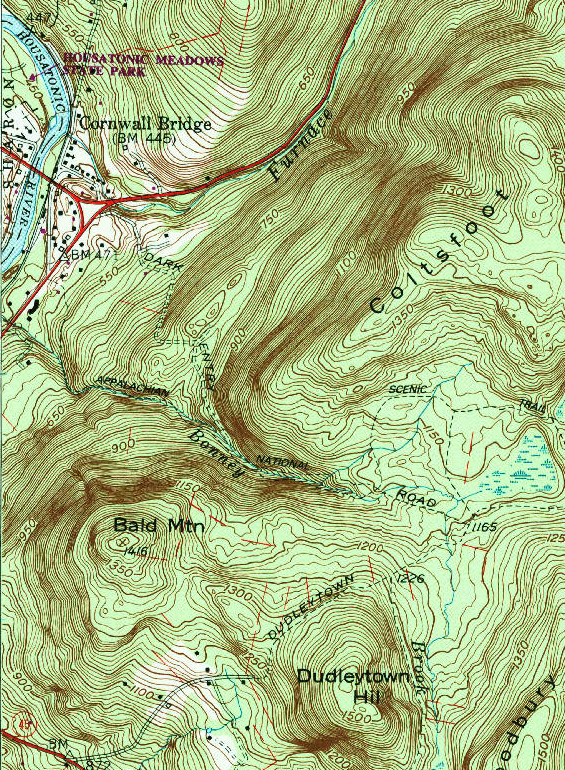
Excerpt of 1984 United States Geological Survey map, Dudleytown Road and Dudleytown Hill appears near bottom. Cornwall Bridge is at top left.

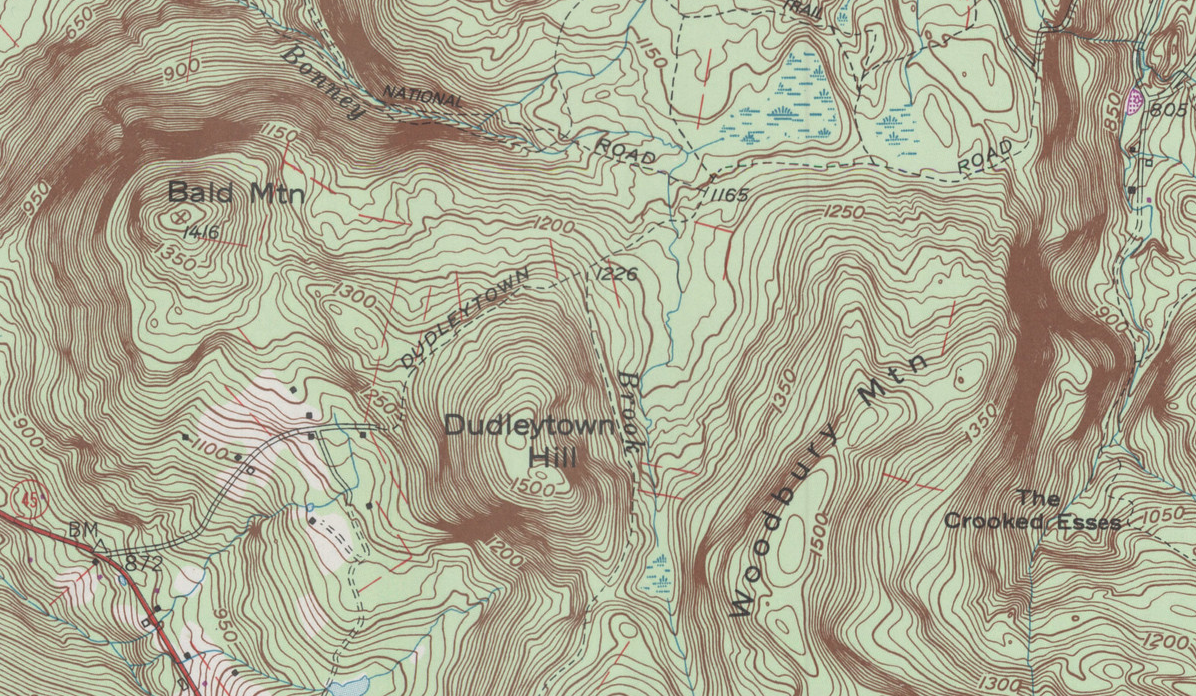
Another 1984 USGS excerpt

Dudleytown is an abandoned settlement, located in a valley known as the Dark Entry Forest, in northwestern Connecticut in the United States, best known today as a ghost town. Due to vandalism and trespassers, the site is not open to the public.

Since the mid-1920s, the land occupied by the village has been maintained by philanthropists as a private land trust, who worked to reforest the land after decades of agricultural use. Only a few traces, such as cellar holes, remain of the original village. Due to rumors of ghost activity beginning in the 1980s, the village site has been subject to frequent vandalism, and the owners have since closed the land to the public.

== History ==
Dudleytown was never an actual town. The name was given at an unknown date to a portion of Cornwall that included several members of the Dudley family. The area that became known as Dudleytown was settled in the early 1740s by Thomas Griffis, followed by Gideon Dudley and, by 1753, Barzillai Dudley and Abiel Dudley; Martin Dudley joined them a few years later. Other families also settled there.

As with every other part of Cornwall, Connecticut, Dudleytown was converted from forest to farm land. Families tilled the land for generations. Located on top of a high hill (all other references say it was in a valley), Dudleytown was not ideally suited for farming. When more fertile and spacious land opened up in the Midwest in the mid-19th century, and as the local iron industry wound down, Cornwall's population declined.

== Geography and conservation ==
The village was located a few miles south of the Cornwall Bridge neighborhood of Cornwall. It was located in a valley, known as the Dark Entry Forest, due to the shadows caused by the mountains surrounding the village and access road. The town's abandonment has meant that barely any ruins of the original township survive. During the early 20th century, old farms in Cornwall were sold to New Yorkers seeking a better life in the countryside, including Dudleytown, which has been privately owned since 1924 by Dark Entry Forest, Incorporated. The land surrounding the village site is today closed to the public.

In promoting the land trust to investors, a March 1924 prospectus for the Dark Entry Forest stated: "This society is planned to promote forestation, to run a wood mill, to promote conservation of bird, animal and wildflower life, and to afford a playground for you and your children and your children's children." Soon after acquisition, the owners planted thousands of trees. During the 1930s, New York's Skidreiverein Club spent their winter weekends skiing on trails they built in the area; in the summers, they canoed down the Housatonic River. Horse riding camps for children were also held on the site.

== Rumors and vandalism ==
Dudleytown is said to be haunted. A local rumor that has been frequently shared on the internet alleges the founders of the town were descended from Edmund Dudley, an English nobleman who was beheaded for treason during the reign of Henry VII. From that moment on, the Dudley family was placed under a curse which followed them across the Atlantic to America. This curse is blamed for instances of crop failures and mental illness, as well as several purported violent deaths in the village. Local historians have found no genealogical link between the Dudley family of Cornwall and the English nobleman and noted many other factual inconsistencies in the rumors. Records have shown the land was originally occupied by the Mohawk Nation, as sacred ground. The village's decline has instead been attributed to its distance from clean drinking water and unsuitable soil for cultivation. One confirmed case of suicide of a village resident took place in New York state rather than within Cornwall.

Since the 1990s, police in Cornwall have responded to numerous cases of vandalism. In a 1993 interview with Playboy, actor Dan Aykroyd referred to Dudleytown as the "most haunted place on earth." In the same interview, he mistakenly stated that Dudleytown was in Massachusetts. The 1999 movie The Blair Witch Project, about a haunted forest, prompted increased interest in the allegedly haunted village. This increased the frequency of incidents of vandalism. The owners of the Dudleytown's property have closed it to the public.

== See also ==
• Portlock
