= Cornwall Bridge =

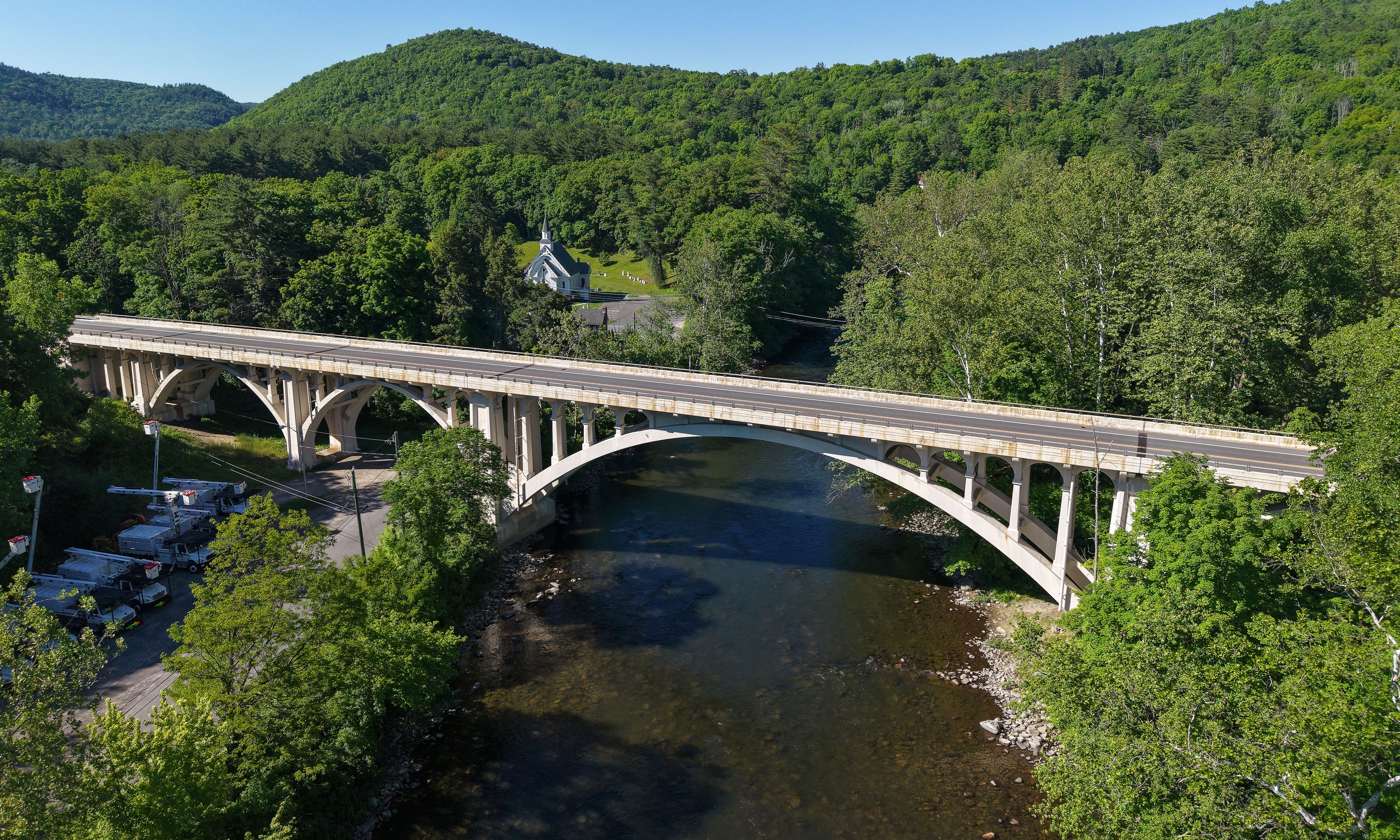
- Cornwall Bridge in June 2026
- Coordinates: 41°49′10″N 73°22′22″W
- Bridge No. 560
- U.S. National Register of Historic Places
- Architect: Connecticut Highway Department; Blakeslee, C.W. & Sons
- NRHP reference No.: 04001090
- Added to NRHP: September 29, 2004
- Carries: 2 lanes of US 7 / Route 4
- Crosses: Housatonic River
- Locale: Sharon and Cornwall, Connecticut
- Official name: Bridge No. 560
- Maintained by: Connecticut Department of Transportation

Characteristics
- Design: open spandrel concrete arch
- Total length: 674 feet (205 m)

History
- Opened: 1930

Location
- Interactive map of Cornwall Bridge

The Cornwall Bridge (also known as Bridge No. 560) is a two-lane, concrete arch bridge carrying U.S. Route 7/Connecticut Route 4 over the Housatonic River and the Housatonic Railroad in northwestern Connecticut. It was built in 1930 by C.W. Blakeslee and Sons for the Connecticut Highway Department and consists of six open-spandrel arches spanning 674 feet (205 m), and is a fairly large example of concrete open-spandrel construction. The bridge was reconstructed in 1994 and was listed on the National Register of Historic Places in 2004.

== Description and history ==
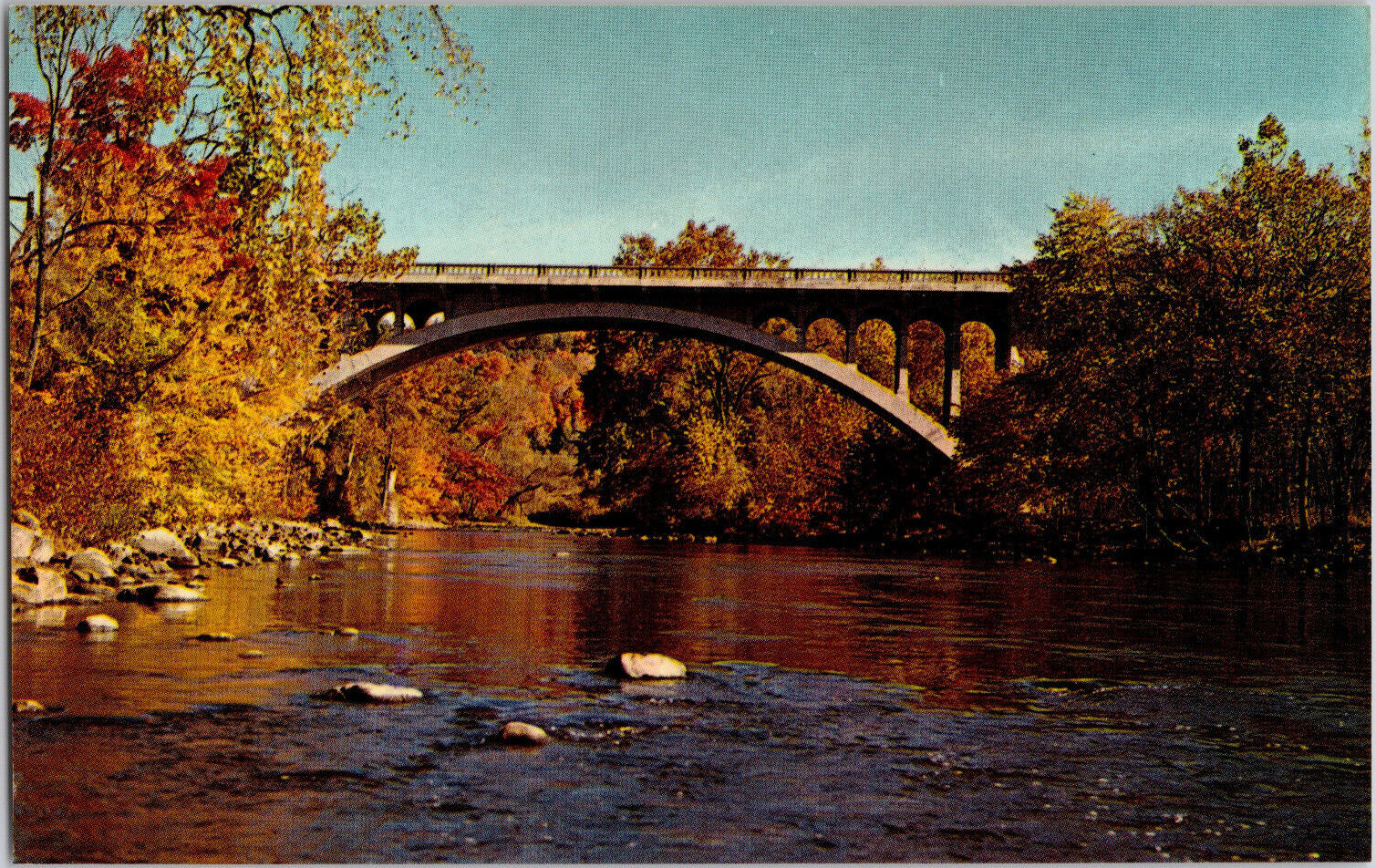
1960s postcard of Cornwall Bridge

The Cornwall Bridge is located in southwestern Cornwall and southeastern Sharon, near the village known as Cornwall Bridge. It is oriented east-west, principally crossing the south-flowing Housatonic River, but also the tracks of the Housatonic Railroad which parallels the river's east bank, and roads named River Road on each side. The bridge has six spans of open-spandrel concrete construction, the longest at 180 feet (55 m) spanning the river. The five smaller spans (two on the west bank, three on the east) are each 76 feet (23 m) in length. In addition to the arched portion of the structure, there are three concrete girder approach spans on each side, giving the bridge a total length of 859 feet (262 m). It carries two lanes of traffic, with no sidewalks.

The open spandrel design was chosen to minimize the bridge's footprint and use of concrete, which would have been much more extensive and expensive with more typical designs. It is one of six open-spandrel bridges in the state, and is the largest of those. The bridge was built as part of a state program to modernize the infrastructure of the state's principal travel arteries.

The village on the Cornwall side is called Cornwall Bridge, having been so named because a bridge of some sort has stood here for many years. The present bridge was built in 1930, and the 19th-century covered bridge was demoted to carrying only pedestrians. The covered bridge then washed away when the Housatonic flooded in 1936. After the state replaced the bridge, the industrial and commercial center of the Village of Cornwall Bridge slowly moved up the hill away from the river, to the current intersection of U.S. Route 7 and Connecticut Route 4. The Cornwall Bridge Railroad Station remains below the new bridge, although it has not received service since 1972.

== See also ==
- List of crossings of the Housatonic River
- National Register of Historic Places listings in Litchfield County, Connecticut
- List of bridges on the National Register of Historic Places in Connecticut
