= Theodore Sedgwick Gold =

19th-century American farmer and Connecticut state secretary of agriculture

T. S. Gold
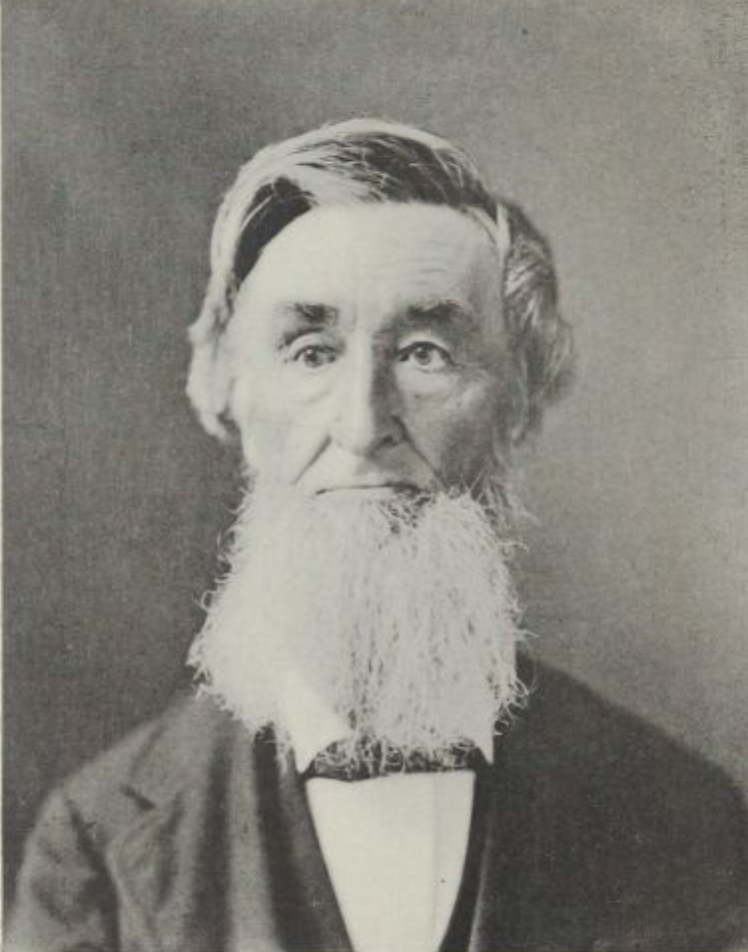

Secretary of the State of Connecticut Board of Agriculture
- In office 1866–1901

Personal details
- Born: March 2, 1818 Madison, New York, US
- Died: March 20, 1906 (aged 88) West Cornwall, Connecticut, US
- Party: Republican Party
- Education: Yale University
- Occupation: Public official, agricultural educator, farmer

Theodore Sedgwick Gold, commonly referred to by his initials as T. S. Gold (March 2, 1818 — March 20, 1906), was an American farmer and schoolteacher who served as Secretary of the State of Connecticut Board of Agriculture (1866–1901) and trustee of the Connecticut Agricultural College from its founding in 1881 through 1901. He played a vital role in establishing the college and fostering agriculture in the state.

== Early life and education ==
Gold was born in Madison, New York, on March 2, 1818. He was a son of Dr. Samuel Wadsworth Gold and Phebe (Cleveland) Gold. His family moved to Cornwall, Connecticut, that same year, returning to his father's ancestral farm. In 1824, the family moved to Goshen, where the doctor practiced medicine for fifteen years before returning to Cornwall to cultivate the family farm. Gold attended local public schools and Goshen Academy.

Like his father and grandfather before him, Gold attended Yale University, graduating with his bachelor's degree in 1838. He spent the following three years teaching in Goshen and Waterbury academies while pursuing graduate coursework in medicine, botany, and mineralogy at Yale.

== Career ==
Gold believed that agricultural education was key to improving the quantity and quality of crops for Connecticut's struggling farmers. In 1845, Gold and his father founded the Cream Hill Agricultural School on their family farm. The school remained in operation until Samuel Gold's death in 1869. The all-boys school never had more than 24 students at a time, but it graduated a total of 272, some as far afield as Louisiana, Michigan, Germany, and Peru. Gold and his father were the only full-time instructors, teaching subjects from practical farming and military drill to foreign languages and piano.

Gold was a charter member of the Connecticut State Agricultural Society in 1852. He and his wife were charter members of the Cornwall Grange and held most meetings in their home. Gold edited The Homestead, an agricultural paper, from 1856 to 1861. In 1864, he obtained from the Connecticut General Assembly a charter for the Connecticut Soldiers' Orphans' Home in Mansfield. He served as secretary of the corporation until 1874.

In August 1866, Gold was appointed Secretary of the Connecticut Board of Agriculture, established by the General Assembly earlier that year. After his father's death and Cream Hill's closure in 1869, Gold devoted himself to the work of the board. Initially formed as a clearinghouse for the state's farmers, Gold's leadership ensured its reconstitution in 1871 as an administrative and regulatory agency, with the power to quarantine diseased animals, appoint state officials, and shape policy. Gold convinced the legislature to establish the Connecticut Agricultural Experiment Station (the nation's first state-sponsored agricultural experiment station) in 1875. He served as secretary of the station's board of control for many years.

Gold was a major influence in arranging for the state to charter the Storrs Agricultural School in 1881. The school became Connecticut's land-grant college, taking away the title and Morrill Act subsidy from Yale. Gold served as trustee of the future University of Connecticut from 1881 to 1901 and exerted a powerful influence on its development. He wrote the trustees' annual reports and continually lobbied the General Assembly for increased funding. The college named its first dormitory Gold Hall in his honor (the building burned down in 1914). The college was the culmination of Gold's use of "progressive means such as education, scientific methods and state organization to preserve the traditional values and social position of the Connecticut farmer."

In addition to his state-wide activities, Gold was an active citizen of Cornwall. Although he never sought elected office, he was appointed to many town committees, taking a special interest in fiscal affairs and education. He served as deacon of the North Cornwall Congregational Church for many years. "To him," remarked one historian, "the pillars of society were family, farm, and church."

Later in life, Gold became a committed conservationist. He served as the first vice president of the Connecticut Forestry Association, formed in 1895 to "develop public appreciation of the value of forests and the need for preserving and using them rightly." Gold's son, Charles Lockwood Gold, also a Yale graduate and farmer, served as the association's vice president in the 1920s.

Gold retired as secretary of the Board of Agriculture and trustee of the Connecticut Agricultural College in 1901, at the age of 83. In retirement, he continued to give speeches, publish essays, and edit the Handbook of Connecticut Agriculture and the Descriptive Catalogue of Farms in Connecticut for Sale. He wrote an unfinished history of Connecticut Agricultural College.

== Personal life ==
In 1843, Gold married Caroline E. Lockwood of Bridgeport. They had three daughters: Eleanor Gold Hubbard, Rebecca Gold Cornell and Caroline Gold Gibson. Gold's first wife died in 1857.

In 1859, Gold married Emma Tracey Baldwin of Rockville. They had two sons and two daughters: Alice Gold Puttkamer, Martha Gold Morgan, Charles L. Gold, and James Gold.

Gold died at his home in West Cornwall on March 20, 1906.
