= Connecticut Route 4 =

State highway in Litchfield County, Connecticut, US

Route 4

Route information
- Maintained by CTDOT
- Length: 46.72 mi (75.19 km)
- Existed: 1932–present

Major junctions
- West end: Route 41 / Route 343 in Sharon
- US 7 in Sharon; US 202 / Route 8 in Torrington
- East end: Farmington Avenue in West Hartford

Location
- Country: United States
- State: Connecticut
- Counties: Litchfield, Hartford

Highway system
- Connecticut State Highway System; Interstate; US; State; SSR; SR; Scenic
← Route 3	→ US 5

Route 4 is an east–west primary state highway connecting rural Litchfield County to the Greater Hartford area of the U.S. state of Connecticut. It runs 46.72 miles (75.19 km) from the town of Sharon to the town of West Hartford.

== Route description ==
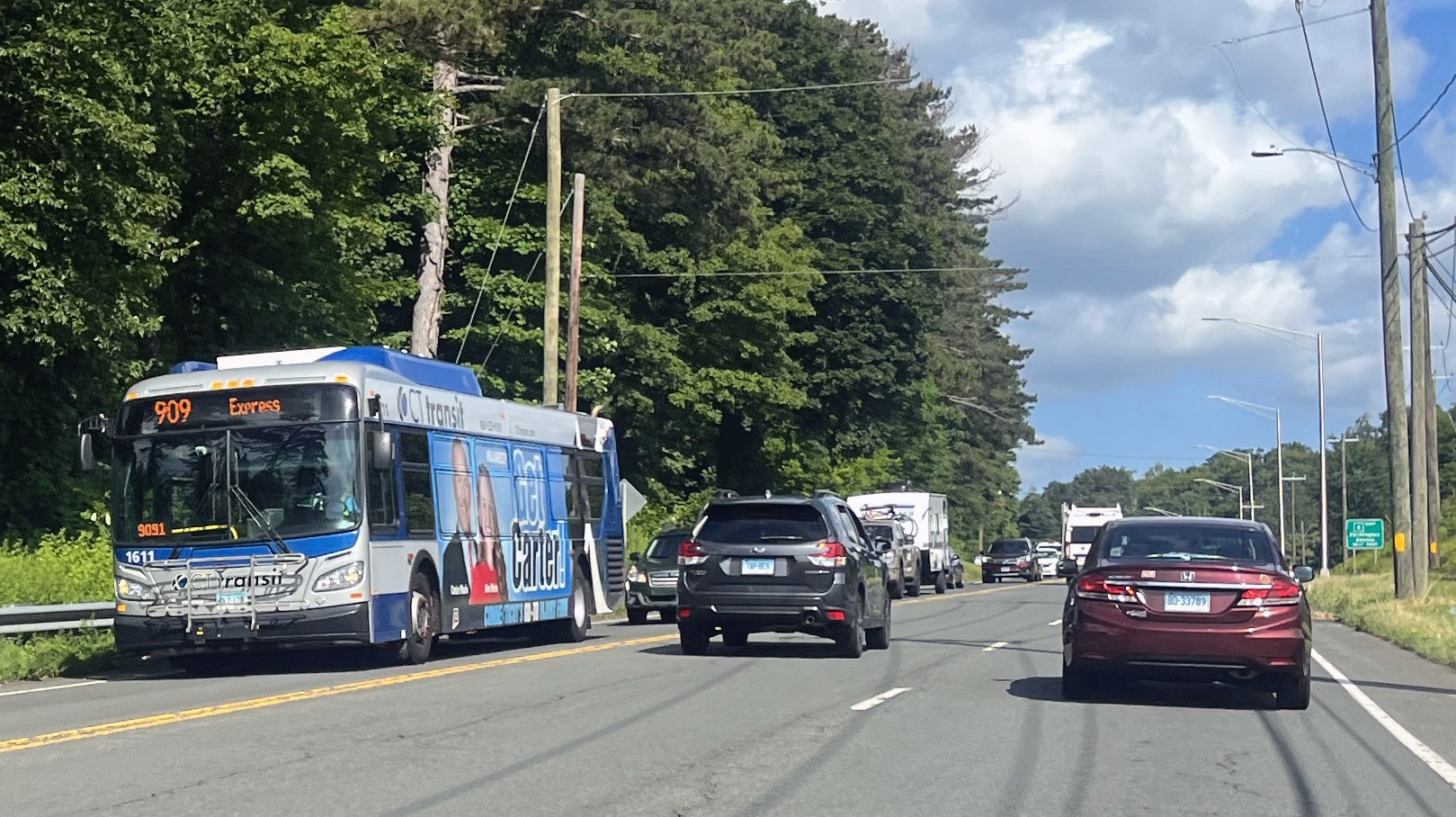
Route 4 northbound near its intersection with Route 508 and connection to I-84. A CT Transit express bus headed for Farmington can be seen in the opposing lane.

Route 4 begins at the junction of Route 41 and Route 343 in Sharon as a rural, minor arterial road. In Cornwall, it briefly overlaps with U.S. Route 7 (US 7) to cross the Housatonic River on the Cornwall Bridge. Farther east in Cornwall, it intersects with Route 125, Route 43, and Route 128 before crossing into Goshen. In Goshen, it meets Route 63 at a roundabout in the center of town. After entering Torrington, the road becomes more of a principal arterial road upon meeting the southern end of Route 272. After skirting the northern edge of downtown, it meets the Route 8 expressway and briefly overlaps with US 202 just east of the interchange. The road turns southeast and returns to more of a rural character, meeting the southern end of Route 183 before entering Harwinton, where it turns easterly at the junction with the eastern end of Route 118. Shortly thereafter, it meets the western end of Route 72. In Burlington, it meets the northern end of Route 69 near the center of town and descends into the Farmington River valley before meeting the southern end of Route 179. After turning southeast, it follows the Farmington River and enters the town of Farmington where it crosses the river just before entering the village of Unionville. From here to its eastern end, it becomes a suburban primary arterial road known as Farmington Avenue. In the center of Unionville, Route 4 intersects Route 177 and it intersects the southern end of Route 167 on the east end of the village. After crossing the Farmington River once again, it intersects Route 10 in the center of town. The road then meets SR 508, a short freeway that provides access to I-84 while Route 4 eastbound traffic continues through one of the state's few jughandles. After passing the University of Connecticut Health Center, it enters the town of West Hartford. State maintenance continues for another 0.9 miles (1.4 km) to the intersection of Boulevard, where Route 4 ends and Farmington Avenue continues as a local road through West Hartford Center continuing into Hartford until ending at an intersection with Asylum Avenue just west of Union Station and I-84 exit 48/48A.

In 1990, a 3.17-mile (5.10 km) section of Route 4 in Sharon, between Dunbar Road in the east and US 7 in the west, was designated as a scenic road by the state. In 1992, this section was extended by 1.05 miles (1.69 km), moving its eastern endpoint to the western junction with Old Sharon Road. A separate section in Harwinton received scenic designation in 1996. This 1.51-mile (2.43 km) section is located between Route 118 in the west and Rock Brook in the east and it connects to a 0.1-mile (0.16 km) scenic section of Route 118. Finally, a 2.02-mile (3.25 km) section in Farmington and Burlington was designated in 2013. It stretches between Route 179 in the west and Perry Street in the east. The scenic route continues northward on Route 179.

== History ==
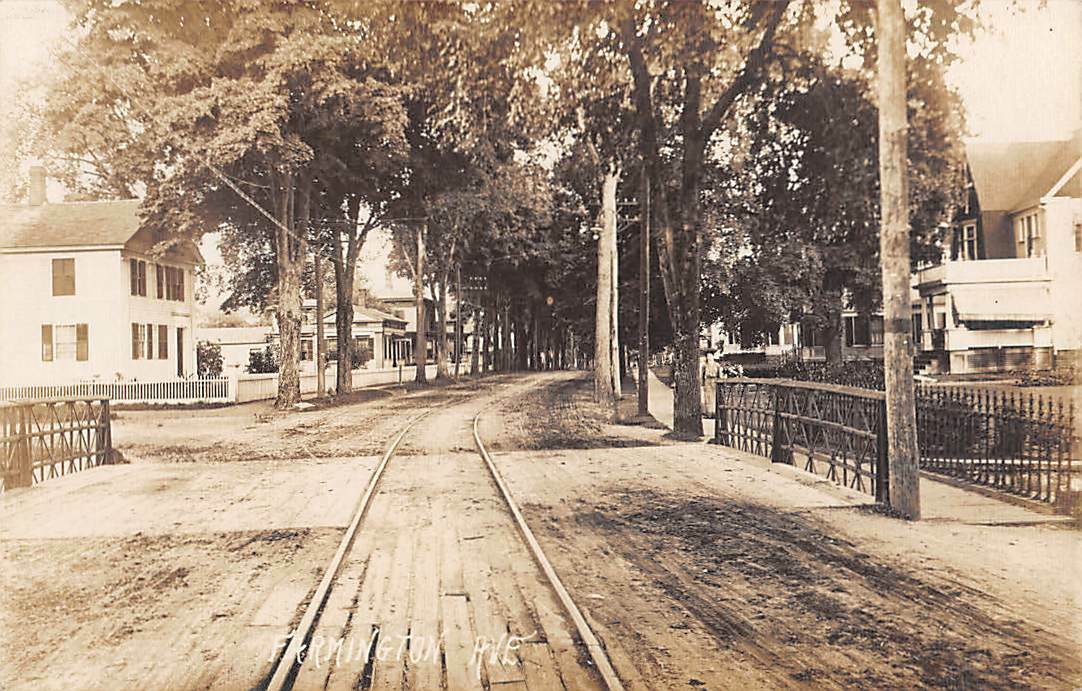
Streetcar tracks on Farmington Avenue in Unionville in the early 20th century

Most of modern Route 4 was first improved as portions of various turnpikes in the 19th century. The section of modern Route 4 between Sharon and Cornwall Bridge was the Sharon and Cornwall Turnpike; from Cornwall Hollow to Torrington, it was part of the Goshen and Sharon Turnpike (which used West Cornwall Road and Route 128 between Sharon and Cornwall Hollow); the portion between Harwinton to Burlington was the eastern half of the Litchfield and Harwinton Turnpike (the western half is Route 118); and the portion from Farmington to West Hartford was part of the Farmington and Bristol Turnpike (which used George Washington Turnpike and Red Oak Hill Road between Burlington center and Route 10).

The road between Cornwall Bridge through Torrington to Collinsville in Canton (part of the Goshen and Sharon Turnpike and the Torrington Turnpike) was designated as State Highway 123 in 1922. The road from Collinsville to Farmington center was designated as State Highway 138 at the same time. Route 4 was created in 1932 from these two state highways, running as a continuation of old New York State Route 361 from Amenia, New York to Farmington at Route 10. In the Torrington area, Route 4 originally ran further north than it does today, along the current alignment of Route 202 from Torrington to Collinsville, then southward along modern Route 179 to Unionville, where it continued east on its current alignment. Route 4 was relocated in 1963 to its present-day route through the area, taking over part of Route 72 and part of Route 116 (now Route 118.

The Hartford and West Hartford Horse Railroad was incorporated in 1863 to run horsecar service on Farmington Avenue. It was later electrified and extended to Unionville as the Farmington Street Railway, following Farmington Avenue except for a small section of private right-of-way in eastern Farmington. It was acquired by the New York, New Haven and Hartford Railroad in 1909 and became part of the Connecticut Company Hartford Division in 1910. Streetcars on the line were replaced by buses on June 5, 1933.

The west end was truncated in 1966 to end at Route 41 and the section connecting to the state line was renumbered to Route 361 to match the New York route. New York has since turned its Route 361 over to the county. In the Hartford area, Farmington Avenue east of Route 10, from Farmington to Downtown Hartford, used to be part of the original Route 6 alignment. When Route 6 was rerouted in 1956, Farmington Avenue was assigned to an extended Route 4. The route designation was later truncated to end in West Hartford where state maintenance of the road ended.

== Junction list ==
County	Location	mi	km	Destinations	Notes
Litchfield	Sharon	0.00	0.00	Route 41 / Route 343 west – Sharon, Amenia, NY, Amenia Union, NY	Western terminus; eastern terminus of Route 343
Litchfield	Sharon	7.64	12.30	US 7 north – West Cornwall, Lime Rock	Western end of US 7 concurrency
Litchfield	Cornwall	7.89	12.70	US 7 south – Kent, Danbury	Eastern end of US 7 concurrency
Litchfield	Cornwall	11.30	18.19	Route 125 north – Cornwall	Southern terminus of Route 125
Litchfield	Cornwall	12.15	19.55	Great Hollow Road (SSR 480 south)	
Litchfield	Cornwall	12.31	19.81	Route 43 north / Route 128 west – Canaan, West Cornwall	Southern terminus of Route 43; eastern terminus of Route 128
Litchfield	Goshen	17.60	28.32	Route 63 – Canaan, Litchfield	
Litchfield	Torrington	22.19	35.71	Route 272 north – Norfolk	Southern terminus of Route 272
Litchfield	Torrington	23.53	37.87	Main Street (SR 800)	
Litchfield	Torrington	24.07	38.74	US 202 west (East Main Street) / Route 8 – Waterbury, Winsted	Exit 50 on Route 8
Litchfield	Torrington	24.18	38.91	US 202 west (East Main Street)	Western end of US 202 concurrency
Litchfield	Torrington	24.30	39.11	US 202 east – New Hartford, West Hartford	Eastern end of US 202 concurrency
Litchfield	Torrington	25.70	41.36	Route 183 north – Winsted	Southern terminus of Route 183
Litchfield	Harwinton	28.12	45.25	Route 118 west – Litchfield	Eastern terminus of Route 118
Litchfield	Harwinton	30.25	48.68	Route 72 east – Plymouth, Terryville, Bristol, New Britain	Western terminus of Route 72
Hartford	Burlington	33.46	53.85	Route 69 south – Bristol	Northern terminus of Route 69
Hartford	Burlington	36.24	58.32	Route 179 north – Collinsville	Southern terminus of Route 179
Hartford	Farmington	38.84	62.51	Route 177 – Canton, Plainville	
Hartford	Farmington	39.10	62.93	Route 167 north – Simsbury, Bradley International Airport	Southern terminus of Route 167
Hartford	Farmington	42.77	68.83	Route 10 – Avon, Plainville	
Hartford	Farmington	43.74	70.39	To I-84 (US 6 east) – Hartford, Waterbury	Access via SR 508
Hartford	Farmington	44.14	71.04	South Road (SR 531)	
Hartford	West Hartford	46.72	75.19	Farmington Avenue	Continuation east
1.000 mi = 1.609 km; 1.000 km = 0.621 mi: Concurrency terminus
