= Mary lePage =

Mary Hebard LePage (22 February 1879 – 7 August 1962) also known as "Sister Shivani", was an American disciple of Abhedananda, who wrote an account of his visit to America.

== Biography ==
Lepage was initiated by Abhedananda in December 1908, at the Berkshire Ashram, West Cornwall, Connecticut, where she lived for four months. She later married fellow disciple Thomas LePage (Haridas), with whom she had seven children, two died in infancy. She worked as a proofreader at Princeton University Press, and then in 1916, the LePage family moved to Los Angeles, where she attended Abhedananda's public presentations in 1917. In 1920, the family moved to Tujunga, where Abhedananda visited them twice before leaving America in 1921. In 1923, the LePages homesteaded 640 acres in Jumpier Hills, California, which they named "Abhedananda Acres". There, LePage's sons printed on a hand press hymns written by Abhedananda, which were later regularly sung at Ramakrishna Centres around the world.
LePage began writing a book about Abhedananda at "Abhedananda Acres"; her first draft, and years of records, were burned in a house fire there in 1943. She subsequently rewrote it "largely from memory and inspiration", and it was published in 1947 as An Apostle of Monism. It was republished, in 1951 and later editions, as Swami Abhedananda in America. It has been described by one writer as "an intimate and firsthand account of Abhedananda's eventful stay in the West by one of his most ardent disciples", and by another as "partisan, defending the swami at every point, while dismissing his opponents."

== Works ==
- An Apostle of Monism: an authentic account of the activities of Swami Abhedananda in America OCLC 570235084, 22653584, 1075688749
- Swami Abhedananda in America OCLC 969682012, 11311204
