= Great Falls (Housatonic River) =

Coordinates: 41.9625°N 73.3722°W

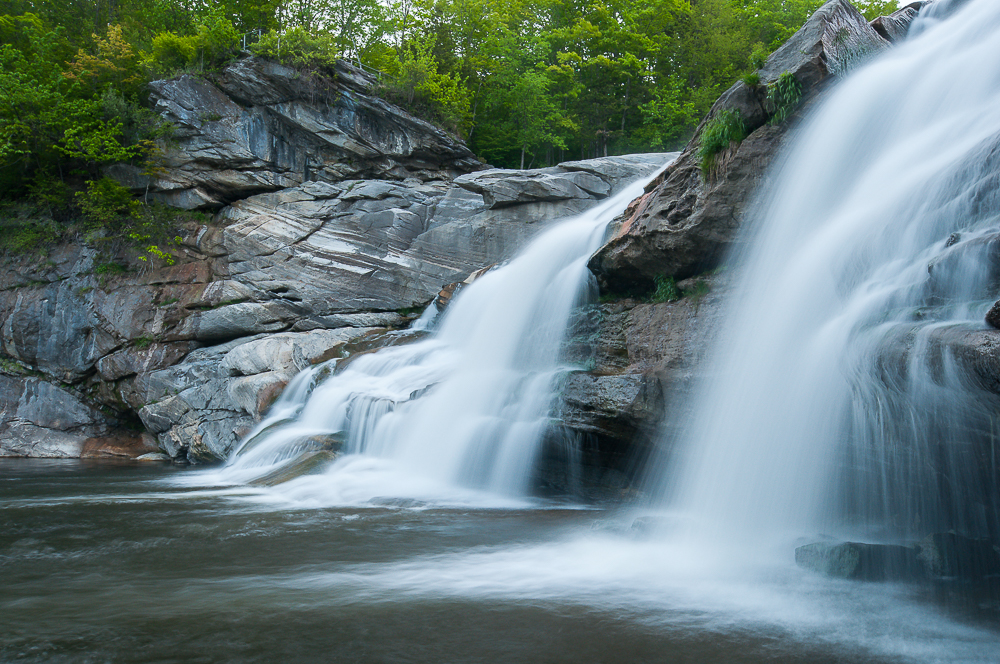
- Great Falls, springtime of 2013
- Interactive map of Great Falls
- Location: Falls Village, Canaan, Connecticut
- Total height: 50 ft (15 m)
- Total width: 112 ft (34 m)
- Watercourse: Housatonic River

Great Falls is a waterfall formed along the Housatonic River at Falls Village in the town of Canaan amidst Connecticut's Litchfield Hills. Great Falls is the highest volume waterfall in the state, though a great deal of its potential water volume is diverted immediately upstream during most of the year for hydro-electric power generation.

== See also ==
- List of waterfalls
