= Cream Hill Agricultural School =

- U.S. National Register of Historic Places
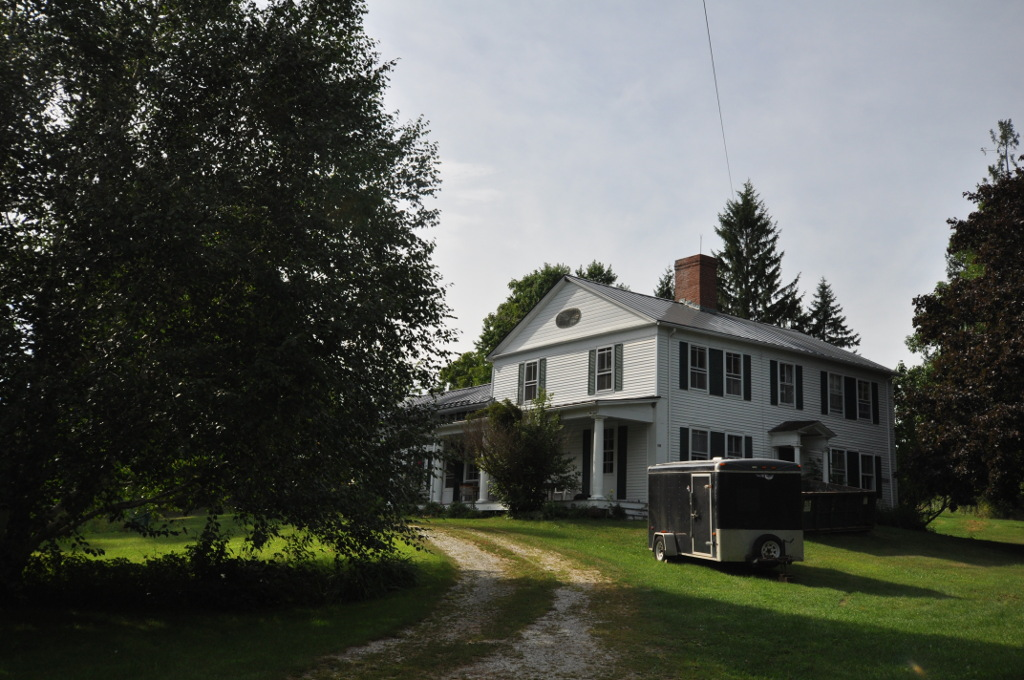

- Location within Connecticut Location within the United States
- Location: Cream Hill Road, Cornwall, Connecticut
- Coordinates: 41°53′33″N 73°19′22″W
- Area: 400 acres (160 ha)
- Built: 1845
- Architectural style: Greek Revival
- NRHP reference No.: 76001986
- Added to NRHP: March 26, 1976

The Cream Hill Agricultural School is believed to be the first school in the United States devoted to education in agricultural practices. Founded in 1845 on a farmstead on Cream Hill Road in northern Cornwall, Connecticut, it operated until 1869. The property, still in agricultural use, was listed on the National Register of Historic Places in 1976.

== Property ==
The Cream Hill Agricultural School property is located on 400 acres (160 ha) in northern Cornwall, a rural community in the northwestern hills of Connecticut. The main farmstead is found on the west side of Cream Hill Road, north of its junction with Wadsworth Road. In additions to more modern farm trappings, much of its historic educational complex survives. This includes a c. 1770 2 1/2-story farmhouse, to which a 1 1/2-story ell was added about 1840. A second wing was added in 1845, specifically for use as classroom space. This two-story flat-roofed structure was enlarged in 1850 with a similar section topped by a square turret. Standing west of this complex are sheds and barns of 19th-century vintage.

== History ==
The school was founded in 1845 by T. S. Gold and his father Samuel, on land they owned and farmed. The younger Gold, educated in agricultural practices at Yale, was a leading force in the promotion of agricultural education in Connecticut, serving as the first secretary of the state's agricultural board and leading the founding of the University of Connecticut. Cream Hill's curriculum was focused on agriculture, teaching soil types, agricultural practices, horticulture, and surveying, but also taught arts and other subjects conventionally taught at secondary schools. It attracted students mainly from New England, but it had a nationwide reputation, and attracted students from Europe and South America. The school closed in 1869.

== See also ==
- National Register of Historic Places listings in Litchfield County, Connecticut
