= Connecticut Route 126 =

State highway in Litchfield County, Connecticut, US

Route 126
- Map of Litchfield County in northwestern Connecticut with Route 126 highlighted in red

Route information
- Maintained by CTDOT
- Length: 6.08 mi (9.78 km)
- Existed: 1932–present

Major junctions
- South end: Route 63 in Canaan
- North end: US 44 in North Canaan

Location
- Country: United States
- State: Connecticut
- Counties: Litchfield

Highway system
- Connecticut State Highway System; Interstate; US; State; SSR; SR; Scenic
← Route 125	→ Route 127

Route 126 is a minor state highway in northwestern Connecticut, running from Route 63 in Canaan to U.S. Route 44 in North Canaan.

== Route description ==
Route 126 begins as Point of Rocks Road splitting off to the west from Route 63 in the Huntsville section of the town of Canaan. Route 63 is signed for the village of South Canaan, while Route 126 heads directly for the town center in Falls Village. In Falls Village, it intersects with U.S. Route 7 and then proceeds to follow Main Street and Brewster Road through the village, then turns north along Sand Road. It follows the east bank of the Housatonic River as it heads into the town of North Canaan, crossing the Housatonic Valley Railroad tracks, then shifting to Belden Street. After crossing the town line, it ends after 0.2 miles (0.32 km) at an intersection with U.S. Route 44 in the southwest corner of North Canaan.

== History ==
The Huntsville to Falls Village section of modern Route 126 was originally the eastern half of the Salisbury and Canaan Turnpike, a private toll road that was chartered in October 1801. The turnpike ran along modern Route 126 from Route 63 to Falls Village, then it crossed the Housatonic River via Water Street and proceeded west through the town of Salisbury along Falls Mountain Road and Farnum Road (part of the alignment has been abandoned) into the village of Lakeville. From there, the turnpike used modern Route 44 to reach the village of Millerton, New York, where the road continued as the Ulster and Delaware Turnpike. This portion of Route 126 was also incorporated in the first state highway system established in 1922. The Huntsville to Falls Village section became the north end of State Highway 132 in the 1920s. In the 1932 state highway renumbering, old Highway 132 became Route 43 (later to become Route 63) except for the north end. Route 43 was aligned so that it went directly to South Canaan. The leftover portion heading into Falls Village became Route 126. By 1938, Route 126 was extended northward to its current end at US 44. No major changes has occurred since then.

== Junction list ==
The entire route is in Litchfield County.

Location	mi	km	Destinations	Notes
Canaan	0.00	0.00	Route 63 – Canaan, Goshen	Southern terminus
Canaan	1.93	3.11	US 7 – Kent, Sheffield, MA	
North Canaan	6.08	9.78	US 44 – Salisbury, Canaan	Northern terminus
1.000 mi = 1.609 km; 1.000 km = 0.621 mi
