= Cornwall, Connecticut =

Cornwall
- Town
- Town of Cornwall
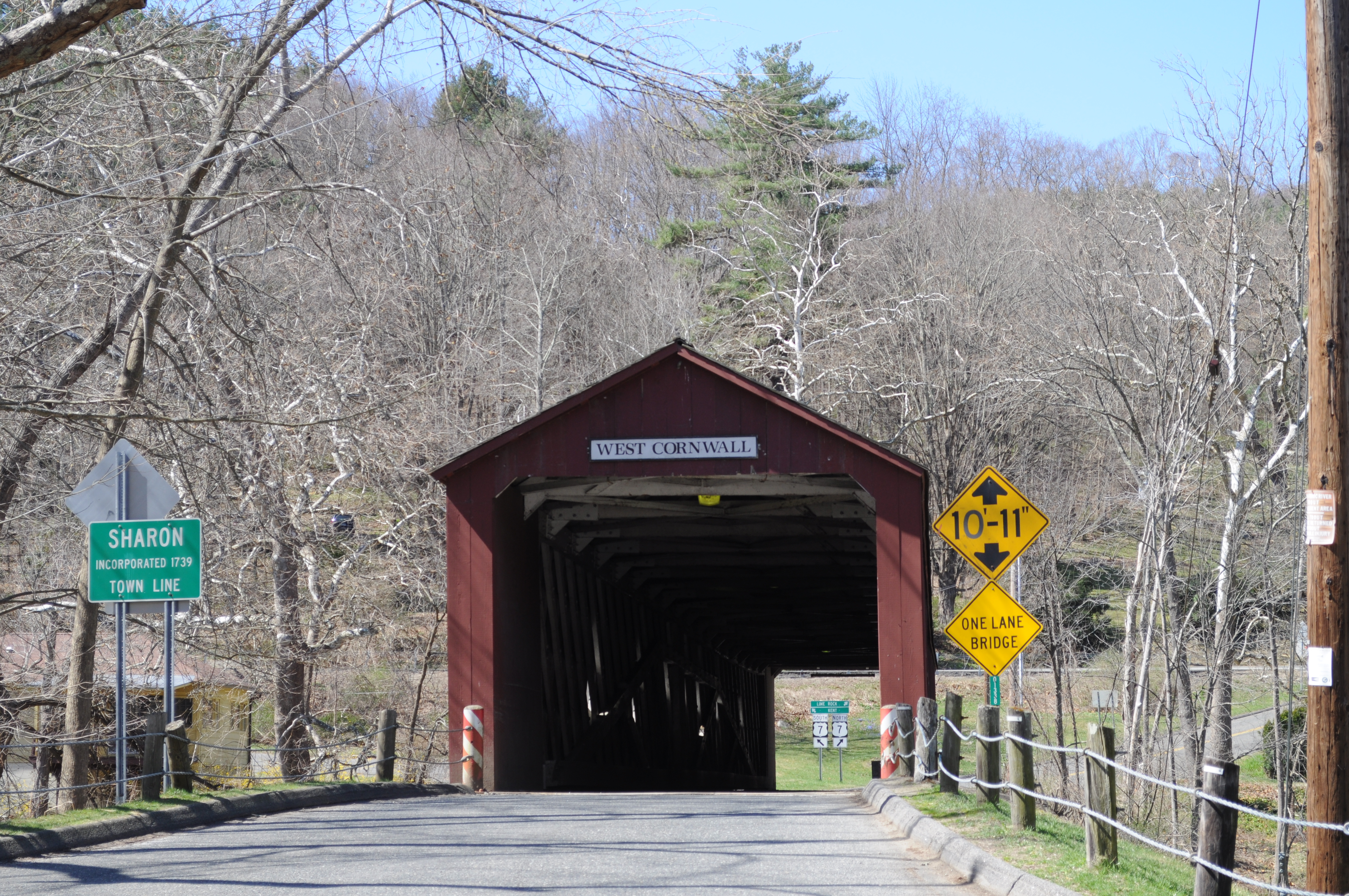
- West Cornwall covered bridge

- Flag Seal
- Interactive map of Cornwall
- Coordinates: 41°50′43″N 73°19′53″W
- Country: United States
- U.S. state: Connecticut
- County: Litchfield
- Region: Northwest Hills
- Incorporated (city): May 1740

Government
  - Type: Selectman-town meeting
  - First selectman: Gordon M. Ridgway (D)
  - Selectwoman: Marina Kotchoubey(D)
  - Selectman: Priscilla Pavel (R)

Area
  - Total: 46.3 sq mi (120.0 km^{2})
  - Land: 46.1 sq mi (119.3 km^{2})
  - Water: 0.27 sq mi (0.7 km^{2})
- Elevation: 709 ft (216 m)

Population (2020)
  - Total: 1,567
  - Density: 34.02/sq mi (13.13/km^{2})
- Time zone: UTC-5 (EST)
  - Summer (DST): UTC-4 (EDT)
- ZIP code: 06754, 06796
- Area codes: 860/959
- FIPS code: 09-17240
- GNIS feature ID: 0213412
- Website: www.cornwallct.org

Cornwall is a town in Litchfield County, Connecticut, United States. The population was 1,567 at the 2020 census. The town is part of the Northwest Hills Planning Region.

== History ==
The town of Cornwall, Connecticut, is named after the county of Cornwall, England. The town was incorporated in 1740, nearly four decades before the United States declared its independence. The town encompasses three townships: Cornwall Bridge and West Cornwall, each bordered by the Housatonic River to the west, and Cornwall Village, located three miles east of the river. In addition to those three townships, there are also the hamlets of East Cornwall and Cornwall Hollow, both distinct communities within the town. One significant natural feature is the vast amount of forested land, including hundreds of acres of Mohawk State Forest, resulting in Cornwall often being called “the “Greenest Town in Connecticut”. The proximity of its settlements to the Housatonic River offered an efficient means of transporting materials and goods, which helped stimulate Cornwall's early farming economy as well as assisting in the evolution of business and industry. During the 19th century and the arrival of the Industrial Revolution, the town maintained two furnaces, including a blast furnace, to support charcoal-making industries. Cornwall was home to the Foreign Mission School, dating to 1817, as well as the Cream Hill Agricultural School in 1845, whose property, still an active farmstead, was listed on the National Register of Historic Places in 1976. Cornwall has long been known as the “Home of the Covered Bridge,” which has spanned the Housatonic River since 1864. One of only three surviving covered bridges in Connecticut, the bridge is a popular tourist destination and among the most-photographed locations in the state. Modern-day Cornwall continues to reflect its rural farming character while being home to arts, culture, artisans and entrepreneurs. Its convenience to major metropolitan areas makes it attractive for year-round and second-home residents.

In 1939 poet Mark Van Doren wrote "The Hills of Little Cornwall", in which the seductive beauties of the countryside were portrayed:

The mind, eager for caresses,
Lies down at its own risk in Cornwall;

Cornwall also makes a glancing appearance in Wallace Stevens's late poem "Reality is an Activity of the Most August Imagination."

Cornwall played a role in the establishment of Christianity in the Hawaiian Islands after a native Hawaiian died of Typhus in the town in 1818. This tragedy was instrumental in the Congregational church's 1820 outreach to the ‘Sandwich Islands’ at Kona, Hawaii.

== Geography ==
Cornwall is in northwestern Litchfield County. It is bordered to the north by the town of Canaan, to the east by Goshen, to the south by Warren, to the southwest by Kent, and to the west, across the Housatonic River, by Sharon. According to the United States Census Bureau, the town of Cornwall has a total area of 46.3 square miles (120.0 km^{2}), of which 46.1 square miles (119.3 km^{2}) are land and 0.3 square miles (0.7 km^{2}), or 0.55%, are water. The town contains a major portion of Mohawk State Forest.

=== Principal communities ===
- Cornwall (has its own ZIP Code for a specific P.O. box)
- Cornwall Bridge (has its own post office)
- Cornwall Hollow
- East Cornwall
- West Cornwall (has its own post office)

== Demographics ==
Historical population
Census	Pop.	Note	%±
1820	1,661		—
1850	2,041		—
1860	1,953		−4.3%
1870	1,772		−9.3%
1880	1,583		−10.7%
1890	1,283		−19.0%
1900	1,175		−8.4%
1910	1,016		−13.5%
1920	834		−17.9%
1930	878		5.3%
1940	907		3.3%
1950	896		−1.2%
1960	1,051		17.3%
1970	1,177		12.0%
1980	1,288		9.4%
1990	1,414		9.8%
2000	1,434		1.4%
2010	1,420		−1.0%
2020	1,567		10.4%
U.S. Decennial Census

As of the census of 2000, there were 1,434 people, 615 households, and 389 families residing in the town. The population density was 31.2 inhabitants per square mile (12.0/km^{2}). There were 873 housing units at an average density of 19.0 per square mile (7.3/km^{2}). The racial makeup of the town was 97.49% White, 0.21% African American, 0.70% Asian, 0.21% from other races, and 1.39% from two or more races. Hispanic or Latino of any race were 1.46% of the population.

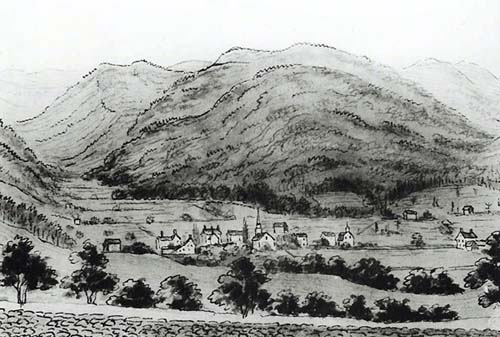
A sketch of the village by John Warner Barber (1835) shows the buildings used by the Foreign Mission School, to the right of the church at center.

There were 615 households, out of which 29.4% had children under the age of 18 living with them, 52.5% were married couples living together, 8.5% had a female householder with no husband present, and 36.6% were non-families. 30.7% of all households were made up of individuals, and 12.0% had someone living alone who was 65 years of age or older. The average household size was 2.33 and the average family size was 2.93.

In the town, the population was spread out, with 24.4% under the age of 18, 3.3% from 18 to 24, 25.7% from 25 to 44, 28.9% from 45 to 64, and 17.6% who were 65 years of age or older. The median age was 44 years. For every 100 females, there were 94.0 males. For every 100 females age 18 and over, there were 90.5 males.

The median income for a household in the town was $54,886, and the median income for a family was $64,750. Males had a median income of $46,875 versus $30,536 for females. The per capita income for the town was $42,484. About 1.0% of families and 3.0% of the population were below the poverty line, including 3.0% of those under age 18 and 1.6% of those age 65 or over.

Some of the main features of Cornwall include the Cream Hill Lake, the Covered Bridge, Mohawk Ski Mountain and the town which contains a library and tennis courts.

Voter registration and party enrollment as of October 25, 2005
Party	Active voters	Inactive voters	Total voters	Percentage
Democratic	330	6	336	31.97%
Republican	246	4	250	23.79%
Unaffiliated	447	8	455	43.29%
Minor Parties	10	0	10	0.95%
Total	1,033	18	1,051	100%

Presidential Election Results
Year	Democratic	Republican	Third Parties
2020	73.6% 760	24.2% 250	2.2% 22
2016	67.4% 622	26.9% 248	5.7% 53
2012	71.2% 629	28.3% 250	0.5% 4
2008	76.0% 732	22.6% 218	1.4% 13
2004	66.2% 625	31.4% 296	2.4% 23
2000	54.2% 455	32.9% 277	12.9% 108
1996	49.2% 408	32.4% 269	18.4% 153
1992	53.2% 473	28.7% 255	18.1% 161
1988	53.2% 448	45.6% 384	1.2% 10
1984	44.5% 347	55.0% 429	0.5% 4
1980	34.6% 268	43.5% 337	21.9% 169
1976	37.8% 284	61.4% 461	0.8% 6
1972	36.6% 281	62.6% 481	0.8% 6
1968	38.2% 246	58.5% 377	3.3% 21
1964	63.8% 407	36.2% 231	0.00% 0
1960	31.1% 209	68.9% 463	0.00% 0
1956	21.2% 133	78.8% 493	0.00% 0

== Education ==
Cornwall is a member of Regional School District 01, which also includes the towns of Canaan, Kent, North Canaan, Salisbury, and Sharon. Public school students attend the Cornwall Consolidated School for grades K–8 and Housatonic Valley Regional High School for grades 9–12.

== Arts and culture ==
The Cornwall Library, organized in 1869, constructed a new building in 2002 that houses a collection of over 28,000 items. It sponsors art shows, lectures, a Books & Bloom sale and tour, along with many other events.

The Cornwall Chronicle is a non-profit monthly newspaper that publishes news and feature stories about Cornwall, a calendar of events, and drawings by local artists. It was started in 1991 and has not missed an issue since.

The Rose Algrant Show is an exhibit of works in all media by artists from Cornwall, Connecticut over the age of 18. It has been held annually since 1959 (2020 was online).

=== Museums and other points of interest ===
- Cathedral Pines – a 42-acre (17 ha) nature conservatory and old-growth forest
- Cornwall Bridge – concrete arch bridge built in 1930 and listed on the National Register of Historic Places in 2004
- Cornwall Bridge Railroad Station – added to the National Register of Historic Places in 1972
- Cornwall Historical Society – located in a converted carriage barn, features annual exhibits on Cornwall's history
- House VI ("the Frank residence") – an example of Deconstructivist architecture
- Mohawk Mountain Ski Area – a ski resort
- West Cornwall Covered Bridge – listed on the National Register of Historic Places in 1975

The town was home to the Foreign Mission School between 1817 and 1826.

== Infrastructure ==
=== Transportation ===
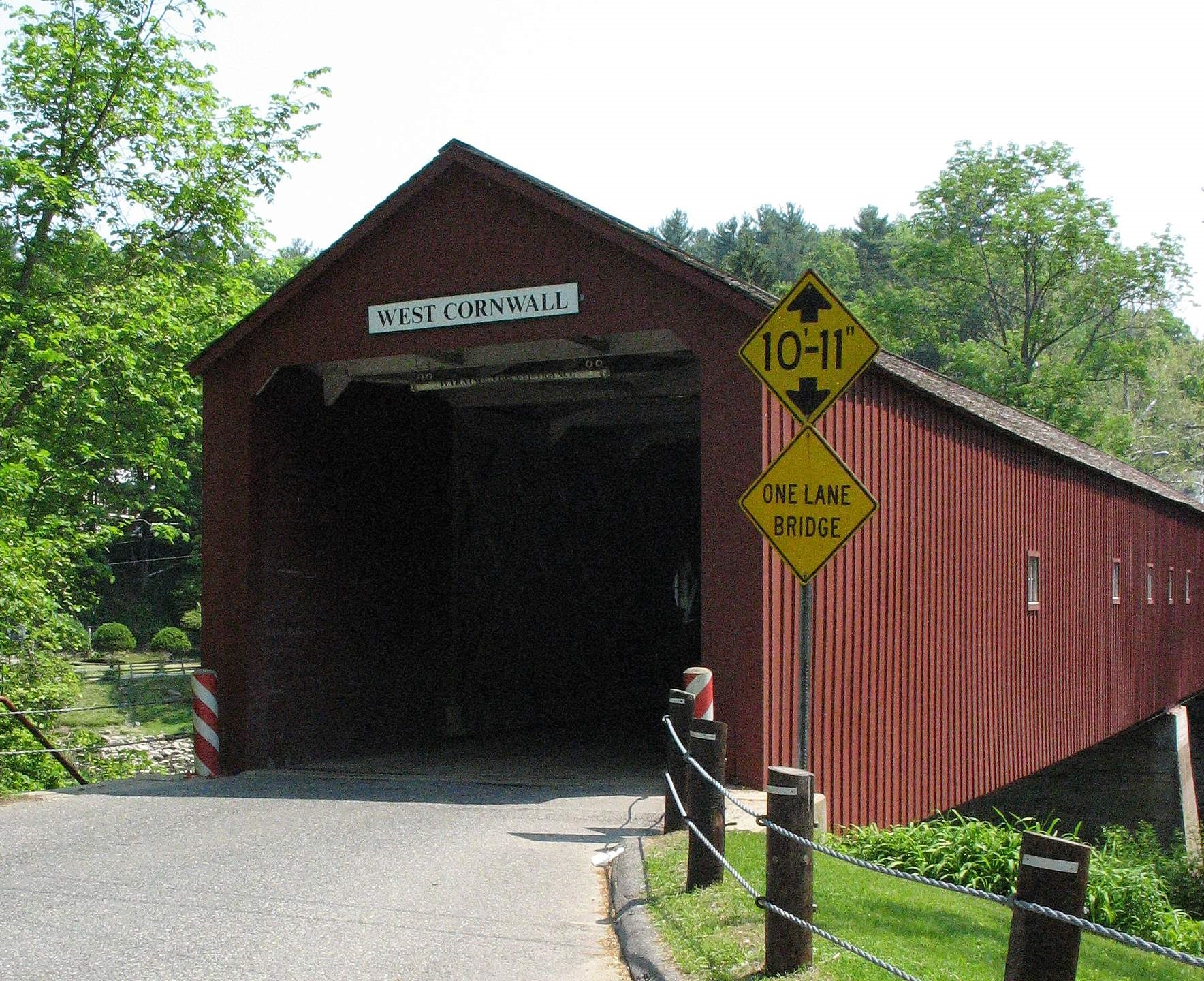
West Cornwall Covered Bridge

The town is served by Connecticut Route 4, U.S. Route 7, and Connecticut Routes 43, 125 and 128. Route 4 leads east 13 miles (21 km) to Torrington and west 11 miles (18 km) to Sharon, while Route 7 leads north 14 miles (23 km) to North Canaan and south 25 miles (40 km) to New Milford. Routes 43, 125 and 128 are entirely within the town of Cornwall, Route 43 running from North Corners near Cornwall village to Cornwall Hollow, Route 128 running from North Corners to West Cornwall, and Route 125 running from Cornwall Village north to Route 128.

The covered bridge in West Cornwall, crossing the Housatonic River, is one of only three covered bridges in Litchfield County. It has a span of 242 feet (74 m) and has been in continuous service since 1864.

== Notable people ==
- Ethan Allen (1738–1789), Revolutionary War hero (Green Mountain Boys) and co-founder of the state of Vermont
- Ira Allen (1751–1814), one of the founders of Vermont
- Norman Dorsen (1930–2017), Law Professor, former president American Civil Liberties Union
- Neil Estern (1926-2019), sculptor
- Edward L. Ferman (born 1937), editor and publisher, most notably of The Magazine of Fantasy and Science Fiction
- Theodore Sedgwick Gold (1818–1906), Connecticut state secretary of the board of agriculture
- Ralph C. Harrison (1833–1918), attorney and Supreme Court of California justice
- Tom Jones (born 1928), composer, The Fantasticks
- Alexandra Paul (born 1963), actress; raised in Cornwall
- Oliver Platt (born 1960), actor
- Tim Prentice (born 1930), sculptor
- Abraham A. Ribicoff (1910–1998), governor of Connecticut and U.S. senator
- Roxana Robinson (born 1946), novelist and biographer
- John Sedgwick (1813–1864), Union Army general killed by a sniper at the Battle of Spotsylvania Court House
- Oscar Serlin (1901–1971), Broadway producer, Life with Father
- Marc Simont (1915–2013), artist, political cartoonist and illustrator of children's books
- Richard Schlesinger, veteran CBS News correspondent
- James Thurber (1894–1961), author ("The Secret Life of Walter Mitty"), cartoonist and celebrated wit
- Charles Van Doren (1926–2019), historian, notable quiz show contestant, resident
- Mark Van Doren (1894–1972), poet and teacher
- Sam Waterston (born 1940), actor; lives in West Cornwall
- Josepha Newcomb Whitney (1871–1957), suffragist, pacifist, elected to Connecticut legislature
