= Dodgingtown, Connecticut =

Census-designated place in Connecticut, United States

- Census-designated place
- Location within the Western Connecticut Planning Region and the state of Connecticut

- Location within Connecticut Location within the United States
- Coordinates: 41°22′45″N 73°21′22″W
- Country: United States
- State: Connecticut
- County: Fairfield
- Town: Newtown

Area
  - Total: 0.43 sq mi (1.11 km^{2})
  - Land: 0.43 sq mi (1.11 km^{2})
  - Water: 0 sq mi (0.0 km^{2})
- Elevation: 510 ft (160 m)
- Time zone: UTC-5 (Eastern (EST))
  - Summer (DST): UTC-4 (EDT)
- ZIP Code: 06470 (Newtown)
- Area codes: 203/475
- FIPS code: 09-20250
- GNIS feature ID: 2805940

Dodgingtown is a census-designated place (CDP) in the town of Newtown, Fairfield County, Connecticut, United States. It is on the west side of Newtown and is bordered to the west by the town of Bethel. Connecticut Route 302 passes through the center of the community.

Dodgingtown was first listed as a CDP prior to the 2020 census; as of that census it had a population of 380.
