= U.S. Route 7 in Connecticut =

Highway in Connecticut

U.S. Route 7
- Ethan Allen Highway; Super 7
- US 7 highlighted in red

Route information
- Maintained by CTDOT
- Length: 78.29 mi (126.00 km)

Major junctions
- South end: I-95 in Norwalk
- US 1 in Norwalk; Route 15 / Merritt Parkway in Norwalk; I-84 / US 6 / US 202 in Danbury; US 202 in Brookfield; US 44 in North Canaan
- North end: US 7 at the Massachusetts state line in Ashley Falls, MA

Location
- Country: United States
- State: Connecticut
- Counties: Fairfield, Litchfield

Highway system
- United States Numbered Highway System; List; Special; Divided; Connecticut State Highway System; Interstate; US; State; SSR; SR; Scenic
← US 6	→ Route 8

U.S. Route 7 (US 7) is a north–south United States Numbered Highway which runs 78 miles (126 km) in the state of Connecticut. The route begins at Interstate 95 (I-95) in Norwalk starting out as a four-lane freeway until the Wilton town line. The route then proceeds north as a four-lane surface road until its intersection with Olmstead Hill Road in Cannondale, then becoming a two-lane surface road through Redding and Ridgefield, where it becomes a four-lane surface road until it reaches Danbury. The route becomes a four-lane freeway again, eventually merging with I-84 for a brief period before it turns and proceeds north with US 202 in Brookfield. The freeway section terminates at an intersection with US 202 at the Fairfield–Litchfield county line next to Candlewood lake. The route then continues north as a four-lane arterial road to New Milford, where it becomes a two-lane surface road, running north to the Massachusetts border in North Canaan. US 7 was aligned to its current route around 1930, and, since then, three sections totaling around 12 miles (19 km) have been upgraded to freeway standards.

== Route description ==
US 7 in Connecticut is also known as Route 7, the Ethan Allen Highway (named after a Revolutionary general), and Super 7. It is mostly a surface road but has two short freeway sections in the Norwalk and Danbury areas. US 7 begins in Norwalk with a four-mile (6.4 km) freeway that runs nearly to the Wilton town line. There are three exits on this short section, signed as The Forty Third Infantry Division Memorial Highway, named after the 43rd Infantry Division. Exit 1, just past the southern terminus at I-95, leads to the Central Norwalk Business District and US 1. Exit 2 leads to Route 123 which extends from US 1 in Norwalk through the town of New Canaan to the New York state line. After exit 2, the freeway reduces to four lanes from six. Exit 3 leads to Route 15 (Merritt Parkway) southbound. This interchange was half built and only allows southbound access from the freeway; northbound access is gained via Route 123 at exit 2. Plans are being developed to eventually complete the interchange. The freeway section ends at Grist Mill Road in Norwalk, about one-half mile (0.80 km) past exit 3.

Near Danbury, another freeway section was built beginning one mile (1.6 km) south of I-84 near Danbury Municipal Airport. This section is also signed as The Forty Third Infantry Division Memorial Highway. Through Danbury proper, US 7 overlaps with I-84 for about four miles (6.4 km). Through this section of freeway, I-84, US 6, US 7, and US 202 all run concurrently. US 7 and US 202 then leave I-84 at exit 7 and travel on their own freeway for approximately seven miles (11 km) to just south of the New Milford town line. On this section there are two exits. At exit 11, US 202 exits the freeway, and at exit 12, US 202 crosses back over US 7. On southbound US 7, the exit for I-84 eastbound is signed as exit 10. The US 7 freeway then bypasses Brookfield to the west and terminates at an intersection with US 202 at the Fairfield–Litchfield county line.

US 7 is cosigned with US 202 until central New Milford, where US 202 turns east with Route 67 while US 7 continues north. Recent construction has also made large parts of US 7 between the terminus of the freeway and New Milford a four-lane arterial road. North of New Milford center, US 7 remains a two-lane surface road through the rest of Connecticut. US 7 has a short 0.35-mile (0.56 km) concurrency with US 44 in North Canaan before continuing north for another 1.5 miles (2.4 km) to the Massachusetts state line.

A 28.11-mile (45.24 km) section of U.S. 7 has been designated as a scenic road by the state of Connecticut. It begins at the New Milford town line in Kent and continues northward through Cornwall, Sharon, and Salisbury before ending at the North Canaan town line in Canaan. The route was created in four separate sections with the first section in Sharon being designated in July 1990, followed by the Kent section in October 1990, the Cornwall section in January 2002, and the final section in Sharon, Salisbury, and Canaan in March 2002.

== History ==
The precursor to US 7 was New England Route 4 (Route 4). When US 7 was commissioned, it followed the whole route of Route 4. It entered Connecticut from the north in North Canaan and then followed Route 41 southwest to Sharon and into New York state. This alignment had US 7 follow New York State Route 22 (NY 22) to a southern terminus in New York City rather than in Norwalk. This southern terminus was shifted to Norwalk around 1930 and was rerouted onto other existing state highways of the time to get from Canaan to Norwalk. From Canaan to New Milford, the road was known as State Highway 134 and, from there to Danbury, was State Highway 128. From Danbury to Ridgefield, the road was part of another New England route, Route 3, which was paved in 1924. From Ridgefield to Norwalk was State Highway 126.

Early planning of the Interstate Highway System in the late 1940s and early 1950s envisioned an Interstate route (I-89) paralleling US 7 from Norwalk, Connecticut to the Canada–United States border north of Burlington, Vermont. Connecticut's portion of this freeway was to have paralleled US 7 from Norwalk to Danbury, then follow I-84 around Danbury before branching off to the north and paralleling US 7 and US 202 to New Milford. North of New Milford, the proposed freeway would have continued northward paralleling US 7 through the remainder of Connecticut and into Massachusetts. Of the proposed freeway plan, the section from I-95 to Grist Mill Road in Norwalk, and the segment from Miry Brook Road in Danbury to US 202 at the Brookfield–New Milford town line were built. Construction on the initial freeway segments in Norwalk began in 1969 and in Danbury and Brookfield in 1970, but lawsuits brought on by residents within the highway's path and environmental groups halted construction north of Route 123 in 1972. With an approved environmental impact statement, construction resumed in 1986 between Route 123 and Grist Mill Road in Norwalk and from I-84 to Miry Brook Road in Danbury. The Danbury section opened in 1987, while the extension of the US 7 freeway to Grist Mill Road opened in 1992. Lack of funding and continued opposition to the freeway has prevented construction of the remainder of the proposed highway between Grist Mill Road and Danbury. Instead, from 2003 to 2008, the existing US 7 was widened from two to four lanes from Grist Mill Road to Wolfpit Road in Wilton and from the Route 35 intersection in Ridgefield to the freeway terminus at Miry Brook Road in Danbury. The Connecticut Department of Transportation (CTDOT) has stated its intent to eventually extend the southern section of the US 7 freeway from Grist Mill Road in Norwalk to Route 33 in Wilton (approximately three miles [4.8 km]), but no timetable or funding source has been defined for this project.

Construction on the section between I-84 and exit 12 began in 1974 and was completed in 1976. The Brookfield bypass segment between exit 12 and the current freeway terminus opened in November 2009, after two years of construction. The former US 7 route through Brookfield is now signed solely as US 202.

== Junction list ==
County	Location	mi	km	Exit	Destinations	Notes
Fairfield	Norwalk	0.00	0.00	–	I-95 – New York City, South Norwalk, Bridgeport	Southern terminus; access to South Norwalk via West Avenue; exit 15 on I-95
Fairfield	Norwalk	1.18	1.90	1	US 1 – Norwalk	
Fairfield	Norwalk	1.83	2.95	2	Route 123 (New Canaan New Avenue) to Route 15 north / Merritt Parkway north – New Haven	Route 15 north not signed southbound
Fairfield	Norwalk	2.93	4.72	3	Route 15 south / Merritt Parkway south – New York City	Exits 16 and 17A on Merritt Parkway; redesign in proposal stage
Fairfield	Norwalk	3.95	6.36	Northern end of freeway section		
Fairfield	Norwalk	4.11	6.61		To Route 15 north / Merritt Parkway north – New Haven	Access via SR 719
Fairfield	Wilton	6.03	9.70		Route 33 south (Westport Road)	Southern end of Route 33 concurrency
Fairfield	Wilton	6.29	10.12		Route 106 south (Wolfpit Road)	Southern end of Route 106 concurrency
Fairfield	Wilton	6.47	10.41		Route 106 north (Sharp Hill Road)	Northern end of Route 106 concurrency
Fairfield	Wilton	7.30	11.75		Route 33 north – Wilton Center, Ridgefield, New Canaan	Northern end of Route 33 concurrency
Fairfield	Georgetown	11.65	18.75		Route 57 south / Route 107 north – Redding, Weston, Westport	Northern terminus of Route 57; southern terminus of Route 107
Fairfield	Ridgefield	12.56	20.21		Route 102 west – Ridgefield, Weir Farm	Eastern terminus of Route 102
Fairfield	Ridgefield	16.88	27.17		Route 35 south – Ridgefield, Aldrich Museum	Northern terminus of Route 35
Fairfield	Danbury	20.43	32.88	Southern end of freeway section		
Fairfield	Danbury	21.01	33.81	7	Danbury Airport	Access via Miry Brook Road
Fairfield	Danbury	21.09	33.94	8	Park Avenue	No southbound entrance; serves Danbury Fair Mall
Fairfield	Danbury	21.56	34.70	9 (NB); 3 (SB)	I-84 west – Newburgh	Southern end of I-84 concurrency
Fairfield	Danbury	21.63	34.81	4	US 6 west / US 202 west (Lake Avenue)	Southern end of US 6/US 202 concurrency; no southbound entrance via US 7 southbound
Fairfield	Danbury	23.14	37.24	5	Route 37 north / Route 39 north / Route 53 south – Downtown Danbury, Bethel	Route 37 not signed southbound
Fairfield	Danbury	23.71	38.16	6	Route 37 – New Fairfield	Southbound exit and northbound entrance
Fairfield	Danbury	25.21– 25.30	40.57– 40.72	7 (NB); 10 (SB)	I-84 east (US 6 east) – Waterbury	Northern end of I-84/US 6 concurrency
Fairfield	Brookfield	26.55	42.73	11	US 202 east (Federal Road)	Northern end of US 202 concurrency; former routing of US 7
Fairfield	Brookfield	29.88	48.09	12	US 202 – Brookfield	Former routing of US 7
Fairfield	Brookfield	31.82	51.21	Northern end of freeway section		
Fairfield	Brookfield	31.82	51.21		US 202 west – Brookfield Center	Southern end of US 202 concurrency; former routing of US 7
Litchfield	New Milford	37.24	59.93		US 202 east / Route 67 south – Roxbury, Litchfield, Washington	Northern end of US 202 concurrency; northern terminus of Route 67
Litchfield	New Milford	39.93	64.26		Route 37 south – New Fairfield, Sherman	Northern terminus of Route 37
Litchfield	New Milford	44.36	71.39		Route 55 west	Eastern terminus of Route 55
Litchfield	Kent	50.88	81.88		Route 341 – South Kent, Warren, Macedonia Brook State Park	
Litchfield	Cornwall	58.74	94.53		Route 45 south – Litchfield, Warren	Northern terminus of Route 45
Litchfield	Cornwall	59.87	96.35		Route 4 east – Cornwall, Goshen, Ski Area, Torrington	Southern end of Route 4 concurrency
Litchfield	Cornwall	60.12	96.75		Route 4 west	Northern end of Route 4 concurrency
Litchfield	Cornwall	64.27	103.43		Route 128 east – West Cornwall, Covered Bridge	Western terminus of Route 128
Litchfield	Lime Rock	68.83	110.77		Route 112 west – Lime Rock, Salisbury	Eastern terminus of Route 112
Litchfield	Canaan	70.62	113.65		Route 126 – Falls Village, Goshen	
Litchfield	Canaan	71.73	115.44		To Route 63 south – Cornwall, Goshen	Access via SR 812
Litchfield	Canaan	71.90	115.71		Route 63 south – Cornwall, Goshen	Northern terminus of Route 63
Litchfield	North Canaan	76.46	123.05		US 44 east – Norfolk, Winsted	Southern end of US 44 concurrency
Litchfield	North Canaan	76.80	123.60		US 44 west – Salisbury	Northern end of US 44 concurrency
Litchfield	North Canaan	78.01	125.54		To Route 7A north – Ashley Falls	Access via SR 832
Litchfield	North Canaan	78.29	126.00		US 7 north – Sheffield	Continuation into Massachusetts
1.000 mi = 1.609 km; 1.000 km = 0.621 mi: Concurrency terminus; Incomplete access

U.S. Route 7
Previous state: Terminus	Connecticut	Next state: Massachusetts
