= Cornwall (CDP), Connecticut =

Census-designated place in Connecticut, United States

Cornwall, Connecticut
- Census-designated place
- Location within Connecticut Location within the United States
- Coordinates: 41°50′37″N 73°19′47″W
- Country: United States
- State: Connecticut
- County: Litchfield
- Town: Cornwall

Area
  - Total: 0.56 sq mi (1.46 km^{2})
  - Land: 0.56 sq mi (1.46 km^{2})
  - Water: 0 sq mi (0.0 km^{2})
- Elevation: 718 ft (219 m)
- Time zone: UTC-5 (Eastern (EST))
  - Summer (DST): UTC-4 (EDT)
- ZIP Codes: 06754 (Cornwall Bridge); 06796 (West Cornwall)
- Area codes: 860/959
- FIPS code: 09-17170
- GNIS feature ID: 2805980

Cornwall is a census-designated place (CDP) comprising the central village in the town of Cornwall, Litchfield County, Connecticut, United States. It is in the geographic center of the town, along Connecticut Route 4 (Furnace Brook Road/Cemetery Hill Road), southeast of West Cornwall and northeast of Cornwall Bridge.

Cornwall was first listed as a CDP prior to the 2020 census.

== Education ==
It is in the Cornwall School District.
