= Hartford and Tolland Turnpike =

Coordinates: 41.8387°N 72.4658°W

The Hartford and Tolland Turnpike was a turnpike that once connected the statehouse in Hartford, Connecticut, to the county courthouse in Tolland, Connecticut.

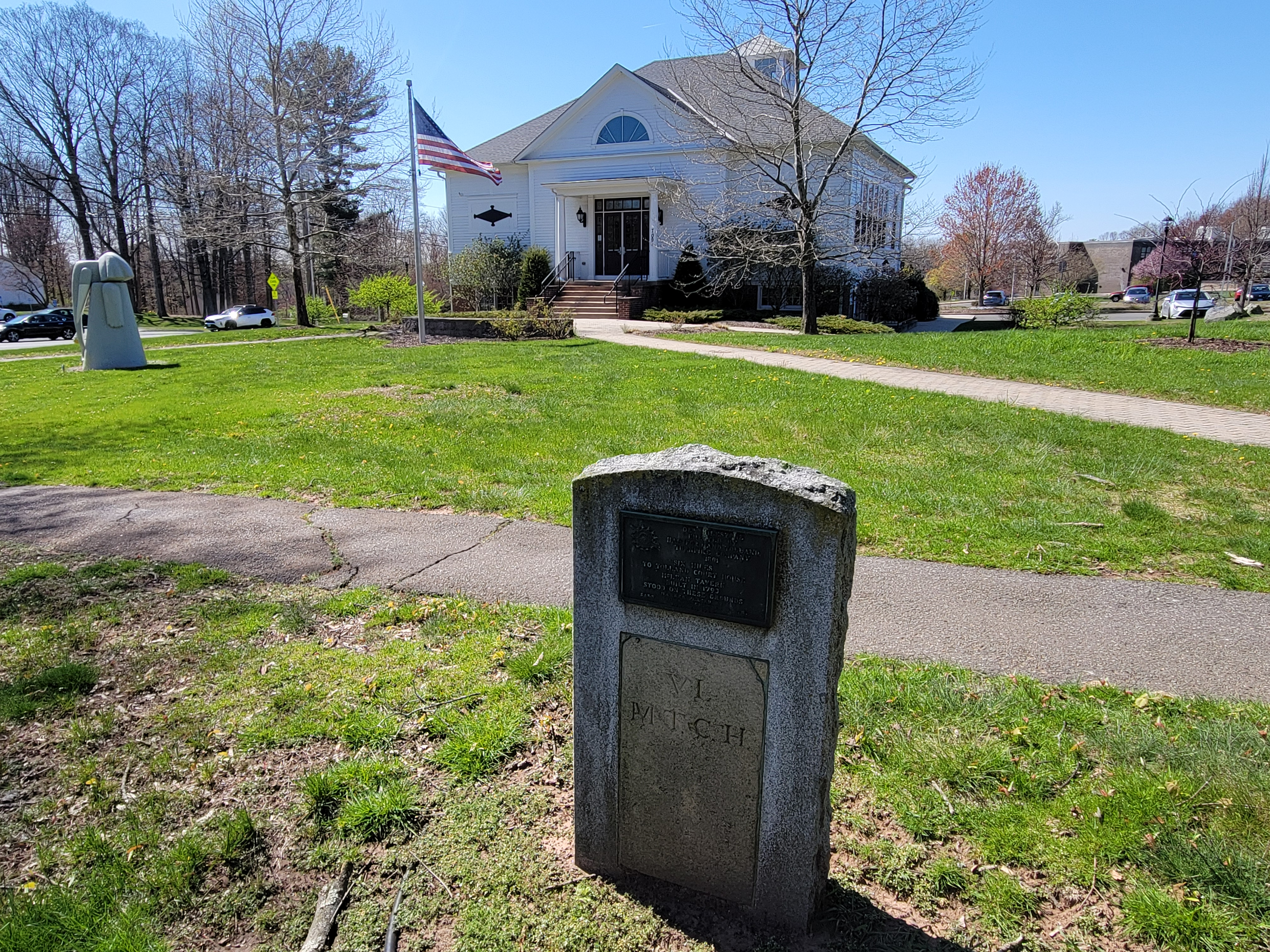
Hartford Turnpike milestone in front of the Vernon Community Arts Center

The turnpike was created by the Hartford and Tolland Turnpike Company, organized in October 1801, and apparently opened to traffic shortly afterward. Due to errors in its initial survey, it was resurveyed in May 1804 and the route adjusted accordingly. Its westernmost terminus was in East Hartford, Connecticut, at the ferry (and subsequent bridge, first built in 1808) across the Connecticut River to Hartford. It then ran roughly along the lines of today's Governor Street and Tolland Street in East Hartford, through what is now the Tolland Turnpike and then Interstate 84 in Manchester, Connecticut, then along the Hartford Turnpike (Connecticut Route 30) in Vernon, Connecticut, and into Tolland, Connecticut, and finally along the Tolland Stage Road (Connecticut Route 74) into the center of Tolland. A surviving milestone may be seen on the Hartford Turnpike in front of the Vernon Community Arts Center.

Tolland was a junction point for multiple turnpikes, and when the Stafford Pool Turnpike (c. 1803) and Worcester and Stafford Turnpike (1810) opened, the Hartford and Tolland Turnpike formed an important segment in the major route between Hartford and Boston via Worcester, Massachusetts.
