= Sharon (CDP), Connecticut =

Sharon, Connecticut
- Census-designated place
- Location in Litchfield County, Connecticut
- Coordinates: 41°52′52″N 73°28′35″W
- State: Connecticut
- County: Litchfield
- Town: Sharon

Area
  - Total: 3.01 sq mi (7.80 km^{2})
  - Land: 2.99 sq mi (7.75 km^{2})
  - Water: 0.019 sq mi (0.05 km^{2})
- Elevation: 714 ft (218 m)

Population (2010)
  - Total: 729
  - Density: 244/sq mi (94.1/km^{2})
- ZIP Code: 06069
- FIPS code: 09-67890

Sharon is a census-designated place (CDP) in Litchfield County, Connecticut, United States. It is the primary village within the town of Sharon. As of the 2010 census, the population of the CDP was 729, out of 2,782 in the entire town.

== Geography ==
Sharon village is in the northwestern part of the town of Sharon, 1 mile (1.6 km) east of the New York state line. It is bordered to the west by the village of Sharon Valley; to the north by Millerton Road (Connecticut Route 361), Lovers Lane, Low Road, and Cole Road; to the east by Williams Road, Jewett Hill Road, Jackson Hill Road, Cornwall Bridge Road (Connecticut Route 4), and Hatch Pond; to the south by Mitchelltown Road; and to the southwest by a brook which flows to Sharon Valley.

Sharon is 8 miles (13 km) northwest of Cornwall Bridge via CT Route 4, 7 miles (11 km) southwest of Lakeville via CT Route 41, 6 miles (10 km) southeast of Millerton, New York, via CT Route 361, and 5 miles (8 km) northeast of Amenia, New York, via Route 343.

According to the U.S. Census Bureau, the Sharon CDP has a total area of 3.0 square miles (7.8 km^{2}), of which 0.02 square miles (0.05 km^{2}), or 0.66%, are water. The brooks in Sharon flow west to Sharon Valley and join Webatuck Creek, a south-flowing tributary of the Ten Mile River and part of the Housatonic River watershed.

== Demographics ==
As of the census of 2010, there were 729 people, 320 households, and 187 families residing in the CDP. The population density was 244 inhabitants per square mile (94/km^{2}). There were 437 housing units, of which 117, or 26.8%, were vacant. 67 of the vacant units were for seasonal or recreational use. The racial makeup of the CDP was 95.1% White, 1.4% African American, 1.2% Asian, 1.4% some other race, and 1.0% from two or more races. Hispanic or Latino of any race were 3.0% of the population.

Of the 320 households in the community, 19.4% had children under the age of 18 living with them, 47.5% were headed by married couples living together, 8.4% had a female householder with no husband present, and 41.6% were non-families. 35.3% of all households were made up of individuals, and 13.4% were someone living alone who was 65 years of age or older. The average household size was 2.07, and the average family size was 2.68.

14.1% of the CDP population were under the age of 18, 6.1% were from 18 to 24, 11.6% were from 25 to 44, 36.9% were from 45 to 64, and 31.3% were 65 years of age or older. The median age was 54.2 years. For every 100 females, there were 82.7 males. For every 100 females age 18 and over, there were 83.0 males.

== Education ==
It is in the Sharon School District.
