= Mohawk Mountain Ski Area =

Ski area in Cornwall, Connecticut

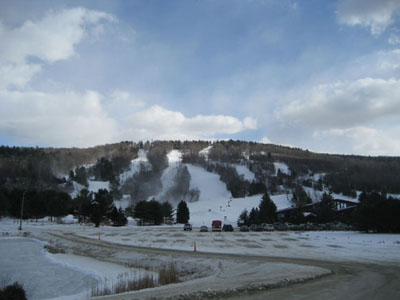
- Mohawk Mountain in 2007
- Interactive map of Mohawk Mountain Ski Area
- Location: Cornwall, Litchfield County, Connecticut, United States
- Coordinates: 41.83675°N 73.31342°W
- Vertical: 650 ft (200 m)
- Skiable area: 112 acres (45 ha)
- Trails: 27
- Longest run: 1.25 m (4 ft 1 in)
- Lift system: 8 total: 5 Triples, 3 Surface Lifts
- Snowmaking: 99%
- Website: mohawkmtn.com

Mohawk Mountain is a ski area located in Cornwall, Connecticut, United States. The ski area was built on the northwest slope of Mohawk Mountain by Walt Schoenknecht in 1947. It is a popular destination for both day and night skiers and snowboarders in the tri-State area (New York/Connecticut/New Jersey). Mohawk Mountain is approximately a 95-mile (153 km) ride to Mohawk Mountain from Manhattan. Like most ski areas on the East Coast south of Massachusetts, the resort has struggled with dependable snow in winter, and has depended on its efforts in creating and popularizing the snow gun and artificial snow.

== History ==
Mohawk Mountain ski area was first opened by Walt Schoenknecht, later of Mount Snow fame, in 1947.

In 1969, a new Carlevaro-Savio double chairlift was installed.

In 1978, a new Hall triple chairlift was installed.

In 1989, a tornado destroyed many of the ski area's lifts and trees. While the lifts were reconstructed, to this day the tree destruction is still visible from the base area.

In the summer of 2008, Mohawk Mountain installed a CTEC triple chairlift to replace the Mohawk Double. Formerly placed at Loon Mountain from 1984 to 2004, it is now the Mohawk Triple Chair as seen on their Trail Map.

In 2019, Mohawk Mountain introduced snowtubing to its list of services.
