= Falls Village, Connecticut =

- Census-designated place
- D.M. Hunt Library

- Location in Litchfield County, Connecticut

- Location within Connecticut Location within the United States
- Country: United States
- State: Connecticut
- Town: Canaan

Area
  - Total: 1.59 sq mi (4.13 km^{2})
  - Land: 1.59 sq mi (4.13 km^{2})
  - Water: 0 sq mi (0.0 km^{2})
- Elevation: 640 ft (200 m)

Population (2010)
  - Total: 538
  - Density: 337/sq mi (130.2/km^{2})
- Time zone: UTC-5 (EST)
  - Summer (DST): UTC-4 (EDT)
- ZIP Code: 06031
- Area code: 860
- FIPS code: 09-27390
- GNIS feature ID: 2631562

Falls Village is a village and census-designated place in the town of Canaan in Litchfield County, Connecticut, United States. As of the 2020 census, Falls Village had a population of 383. Because Falls Village is the town center and principal constituent village in Canaan, the entire town is often referred to as "Falls Village". That usage also avoids confusion of the town with Canaan Village in the town of North Canaan, Connecticut, just to the north. Falls Village derives its name from a waterfall, known as Great Falls, on the Housatonic River within the village.

The Falls Village post office is assigned ZIP code 06031, which encompasses the entire town of Canaan.

== Geography ==
Falls Village is on the western side of the town of Canaan in northwestern Connecticut. The western edge of the census-designated place is the Canaan–Salisbury town line following the Housatonic River, it extends north of the village as far as Page Road, and south to a power line corridor that crosses Beebe Hill. To the east, the CDP extends out Connecticut Route 126 as far as Johnson Road.

U.S. Route 7 passes through the village, leading north 6 miles (10 km) to Canaan Village and south the same distance to West Cornwall. Route 126 leads east from Falls Village 2 miles (3 km) to Connecticut Route 63 and north 4 miles (6 km) to U.S. Route 44 in North Canaan.

According to the U.S. Census Bureau, the Falls Village CDP has an area of 1.6 square miles (4.1 km^{2}), all land.

== Historic district ==
- Falls Village District
- U.S. National Register of Historic Places
- U.S. Historic district
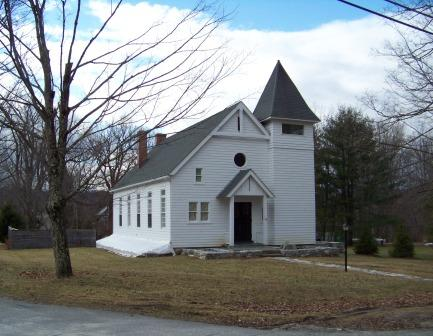
- St. Patrick's Church

- Location within Connecticut Location within the United States
- Location: Canaan, Connecticut
- Coordinates: 41°57′23″N 73°21′49″W
- Area: 70 acres (0.28 km^{2})
- Architect: Lambert & Bunnell; Multiple
- Architectural style: Greek Revival, Italianate, Queen Anne
- NRHP reference No.: 79002622
- Added to NRHP: June 14, 1979

In 1979, the Falls Village District was listed on the National Register of Historic Places as an historic district. The district represents about 70 acres (280,000 m^{2}) that were built in the middle of the 19th century as a result of the area being selected as a station stop for the Housatonic Railroad in the early 1830s. Newer buildings around the junction of U.S. Route 7 and Connecticut Route 126 are excluded.

The historic district includes examples of Greek Revival, Italianate, and Queen Anne architecture. It includes 71 buildings and the canal built to harness water power from the Great Falls northwest of the village. The district is bounded on the south by the east-west portion of Railroad Street, on the east by the rear property lines of houses fronting Beebe Hill Road, on the north by the rear property lines of houses fronting Brewster Road, and on the west by the Housatonic Railroad tracks (with a bulge in the northwest to include the unused 1851 canal between Water Street and the railroad tracks).

Contributing properties in the historic district include the D. M. Hunt Library, built in 1891, and St. Patrick's Church.

== Education ==
It is in the Canaan School District.

== See also ==
- National Register of Historic Places listings in Litchfield County, Connecticut
