= Cornwall Bridge station =

Former train station in Connecticut, US

Cornwall Bridge
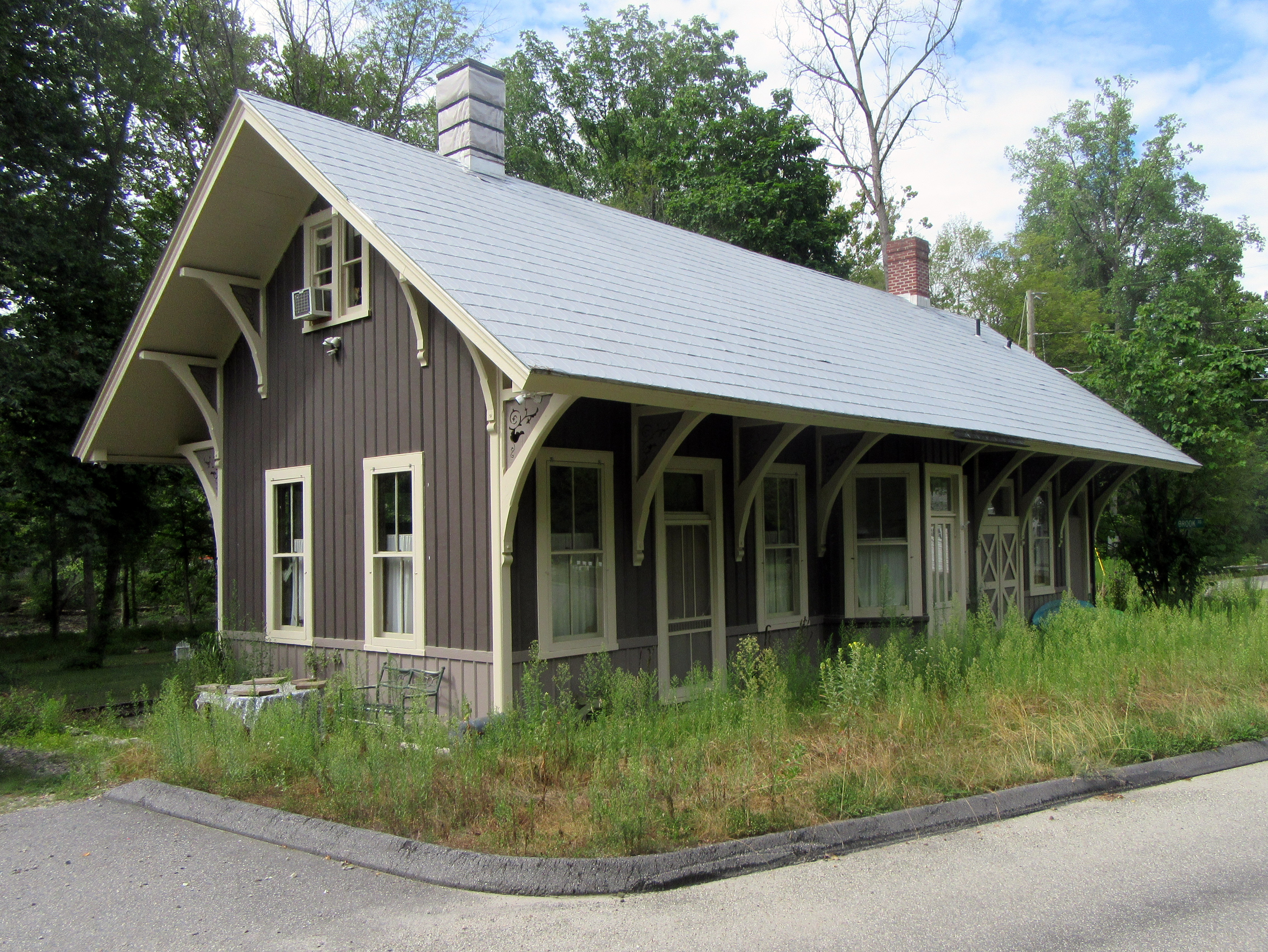
- Cornwall Bridge station in August 2022

Former services
Preceding station	New York, New Haven and Hartford Railroad	Following station
Kent toward Norwalk and South Norwalk	Pittsfield Branch	West Cornwall toward Pittsfield
- Cornwall Bridge Railroad Station
- U.S. National Register of Historic Places
- Location: Junction of Poppleswamp Brook Road and Kent Road, Cornwall Bridge, Connecticut
- Coordinates: 41°49′11″N 73°22′20″W
- Architectural style: Stick/Eastlake
- NRHP reference No.: 72001313
- Added to NRHP: April 26, 1972
Location

Cornwall Bridge station is a former train station in Cornwall Bridge, Connecticut. The station building was built in the 1880s to serve passengers on the Housatonic Railroad. Passenger service on the line ended in 1971, at which time Penn Central auctioned off the station. The following year, the station received a National Register of Historic Places designation.

== History ==
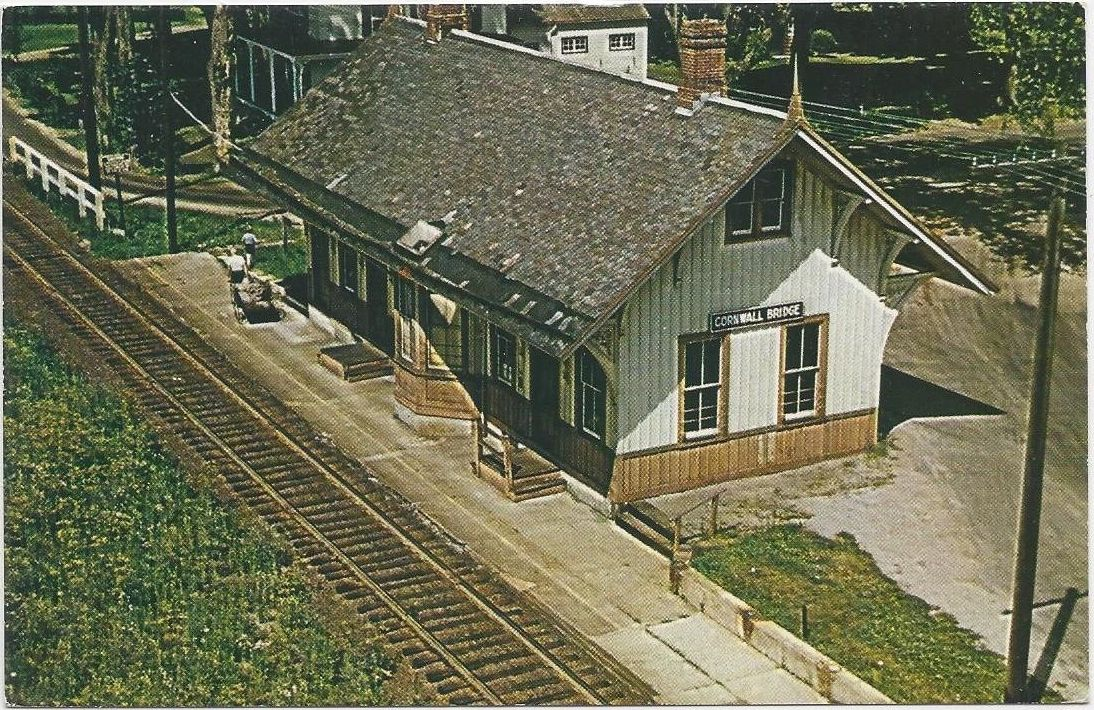
1960s postcard of the station

The station, a Stick style wood-frame structure, was built by the Housatonic Railroad in the 1880s to replace an earlier station. The Housatonic was acquired by the New York, New Haven and Hartford Railroad in 1892. The New Haven Railroad was acquired by the Penn Central Railroad in 1969, which went bankrupt by 1970. The station was added to the National Register of Historic Places on April 26, 1972, as Cornwall Bridge Railroad Station.

== See also ==
- National Register of Historic Places listings in Litchfield County, Connecticut
