= Cornwall Bridge, Connecticut =

Census-designated place in Connecticut, United States

- Census-designated place
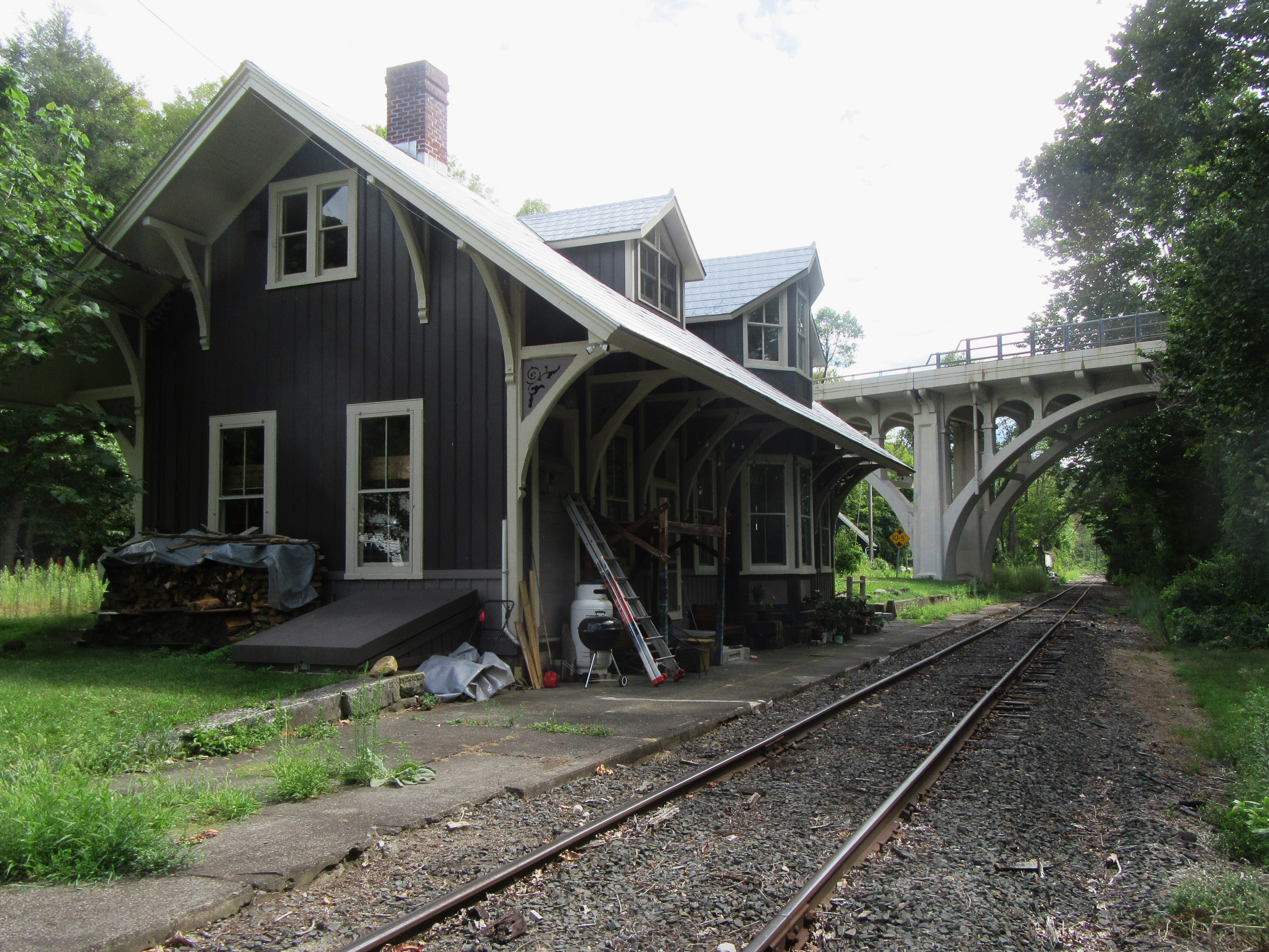
- Cornwall Bridge station and Cornwall Bridge in 2022

- Location within Connecticut Location within the United States
- Coordinates: 41°48′16″N 73°22′59″W
- Country: United States
- State: Connecticut
- County: Litchfield
- Towns: Cornwall, Sharon

Area
  - Total: 2.13 sq mi (5.51 km^{2})
  - Land: 2.05 sq mi (5.32 km^{2})
  - Water: 0.073 sq mi (0.19 km^{2})
- Elevation: 565 ft (172 m)
- Time zone: UTC-5 (Eastern (EST))
  - Summer (DST): UTC-4 (EDT)
- ZIP Code: 06754
- Area codes: 860/959
- FIPS code: 09-17310
- GNIS feature ID: 2805981

Cornwall Bridge is a census-designated place (CDP) comprising the hamlets of Cornwall Bridge and Calhoun Corners in the towns of Cornwall and Sharon, Litchfield County, Connecticut, United States. It is primarily in the southwestern corner of the town of Cornwall, but extends west across the Housatonic River into the town of Sharon in the northern part of the CDP. U.S. Route 7 runs the length of the CDP, following the eastern side of the Housatonic River and crossing it on the Cornwall Bridge in the northern part of the CDP.

Cornwall Bridge was first listed as a CDP prior to the 2020 census. As of the 2020 census, Cornwall Bridge had a population of 287.

== Education ==
Portions in Cornwall Town are in the Cornwall School District. Portions in Sharon Town are in the Sharon School District.
