= West Cornwall, Connecticut =

Census-designated place in Connecticut, United States

- Census-designated place
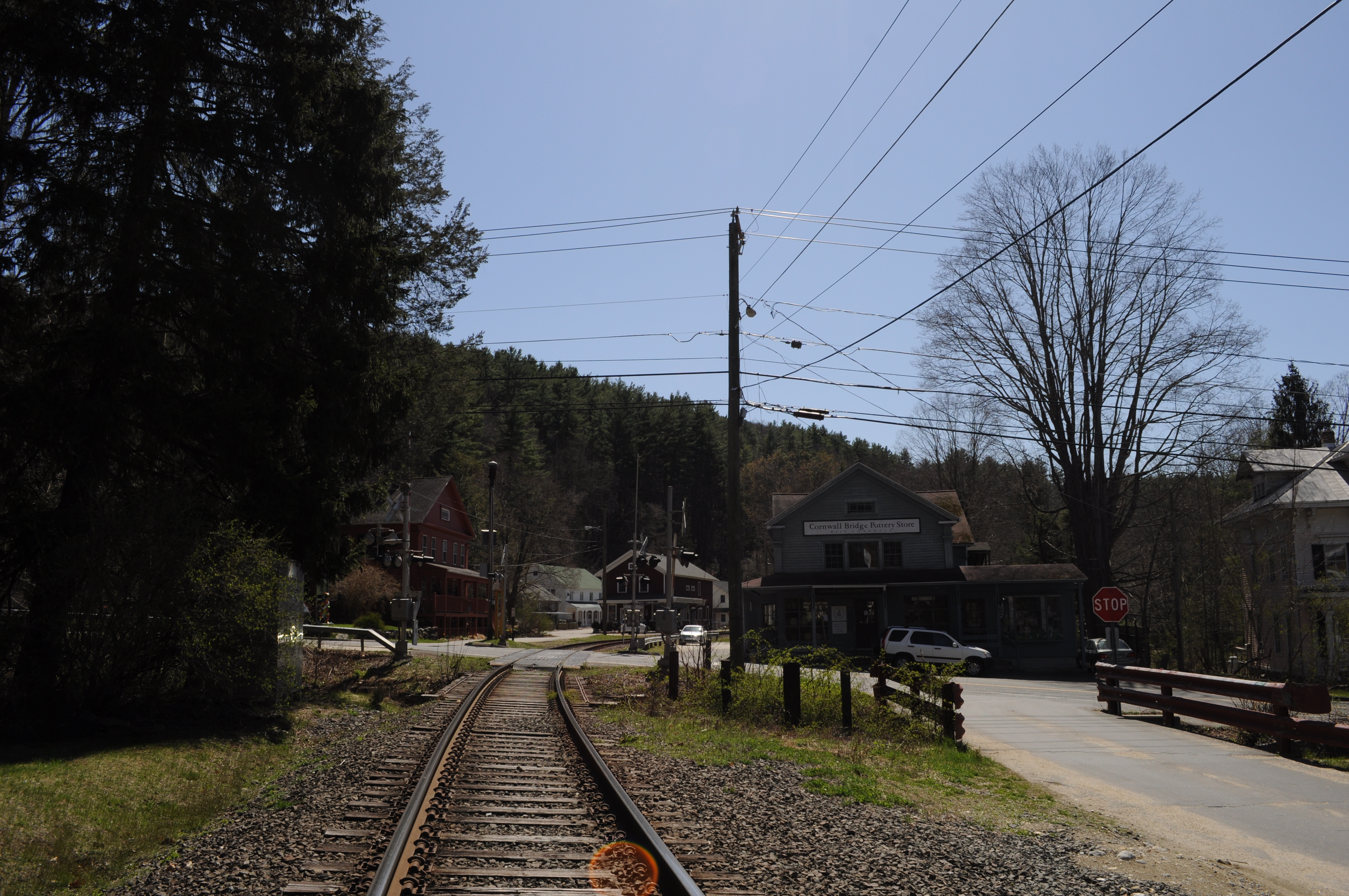
- West Cornwall in March 2012

- Location within Connecticut Location within the United States
- Coordinates: 41°52′17″N 73°21′42″W
- Country: United States
- State: Connecticut
- County: Litchfield
- Town: Cornwall

Area
  - Total: 1.57 sq mi (4.06 km^{2})
  - Land: 1.57 sq mi (4.06 km^{2})
  - Water: 0 sq mi (0.0 km^{2})
- Elevation: 531 ft (162 m)
- Time zone: UTC-5 (Eastern (EST))
  - Summer (DST): UTC-4 (EDT)
- ZIP Code: 06796
- Area codes: 860/959
- FIPS code: 09-82030
- GNIS feature ID: 2805985

West Cornwall is an unincorporated village and census-designated place (CDP) in the town of Cornwall, Connecticut, United States. It is on the west side of the town, on the east side of the Housatonic River, which forms the border with the town of Sharon. Connecticut Route 128 runs through the village, joining U.S. Route 7 across the Housatonic in Sharon.

West Cornwall was first listed as a CDP prior to the 2020 census. As of the 2020 census, West Cornwall had a population of 138.

== Education ==
It is in the Cornwall School District.
