= Cream Hill Shelter =

- U.S. National Register of Historic Places
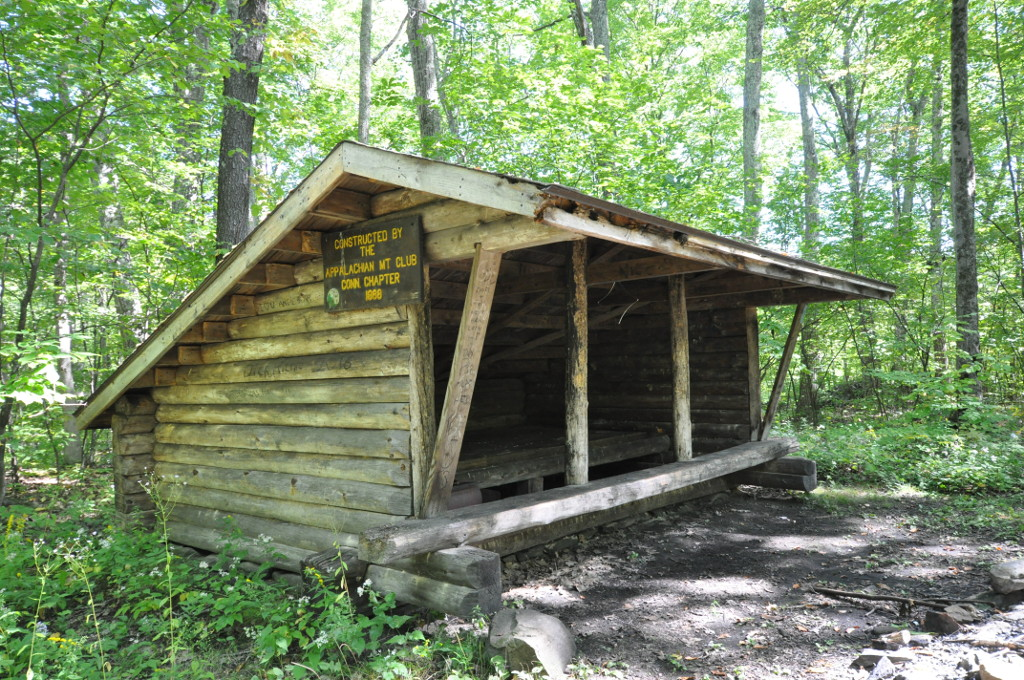
- The 1988 shelter, as seen in 2019

- Location within Connecticut Location within the United States
- Location: Wickwire Road, Cornwall, Connecticut
- Coordinates: 41°54′43″N 73°19′39″W
- Area: 6.5 acres (2.6 ha)
- Built: 1935
- Built by: Civilian Conservation Corps
- Architectural style: Adirondack-Rustic
- MPS: Connecticut State Park and Forest Depression-Era Federal Work Relief Programs Structures TR
- NRHP reference No.: 86001727
- Added to NRHP: September 4, 1986

The Cream Hill Shelter is a rustic log shelter in Housatonic State Forest in Cornwall, Connecticut. Built in 1988, it replaced what was at the time one of three surviving log shelters constructed by the Civilian Conservation Corps in Connecticut. The historic shelter it replaced, built in 1935, was listed on the National Register of Historic Places in 1986.

== Description and history ==
The Cream Hill Shelter is located deep in the woods of northern Cornwall, off Wickwire Road, a forest road (closed to traffic due to a washed-out stream crossing) that runs easterly from Cream Hill Road, roughly paralleling Reed Brook to the south. It is set on a Blue-Blazed Trail a short way south of that road, about 0.75 miles (1.21 km) east of Cream Hill Road. It is a small log structure, with a gabled roof and dry-laid fieldstone foundation. The rectangular structure, open on one side, is built out of saddle-notched logs, with a sill across the base of the open side to add stability.

The first shelter on this site was built in 1935 by a crew of the CCC based at Camp Cross, which was located elsewhere in Housatonic State Forest. Crews from the same camp also built the Red Mountain Shelter in Mohawk State Forest. These two shelters were both located along what was then the route of the Appalachian Trail, which has since been rerouted further west. The Trail had been laid through the area by the state in 1930-33, and the CCC crews (active from 1933 to 1941) were responsible for opening this area of the forest to further recreational use. This shelter was one of two the CCC built in the immediate vicinity; the other, located about one mile to the north, had been demolished at the time this one was listed on the National Register. The 1935 shelter was replaced in 1988 by one constructed by the Appalachian Mountain Club that differs in form if not in its basic log construction.

== See also ==
- American Legion Forest CCC Shelter
- National Register of Historic Places listings in Litchfield County, Connecticut
