= Alain C. White =

American conservationist and chess expert

Alain C. White (March 3, 1880 to April 12, 1951) was an American conservationist and chess problem composer in the first half of the 20th century. He played a pivotal role in Connecticut land preservation, and founded the journal The Good Companion Chess Problem Club. The White Memorial Conservation Center in Litchfield, Connecticut, is created around his family's property. The lands that he purchased and donated to the State of Connecticut formed the foundation of the state's park system.

== Early life ==
Alain Campbell White was born in Cannes, France, the child of a wealthy American real estate magnate, John Jay White. He had one sibling, May, eleven years his senior.

In 1863, following the New York City draft riots during the American Civil War, Alain's father moved the family approximately 100 miles north of the city to Litchfield, Connecticut, a large town which is the seat of rural Litchfield County. In Litchfield, John White purchased a large plot of land and built a Victorian mansion, which he named "Whitehall."

As a child, Alain White began a lifelong interest in playing and analyzing the game of chess.

After his Connecticut childhood, he attended Harvard College, graduating magna cum laude with a degree in botany in 1902.

That same year, he was awarded the Lantham Prize by the American Dante Society for his essay, “A Translation of the Quaestio de aqua et terra, and a Discussion of its Authenticity.”

He then studied at Columbia University in New York, attaining a master's degree in 1904.

== Conservation work ==
White found his inspiration for conservation work in 1908 at the age of 28. While fishing on Bantam Lake near Whitehall, he remarked to his friend William Mitchell Van Winkel, "Wouldn’t it be wonderful to preserve this river, lake and countryside as we see it now?"

Over the following five years, White and his sister May acquired properties that bounded the lake in an effort to preserve their natural beauty, eventually amassing some 60 percent of the lakefront. They hoped to dedicate this land to what historian Peter Vermilyea calls "practical conservation," making the lake available for affordable summer cabins, youth camps, and convalescent homes. In 1913, realizing that the work of managing this much land was beyond them, the Whites created the White Memorial Foundation in honor of their parents.

For the next three decades, Alain and May White aggressively bought up rural properties in the Litchfield County area, including the towns of Cornwall, Goshen, Litchfield, Warren, and Kent and allowed them to return to their natural state. Their efforts were viewed with considerable suspicion at first by their own neighbors, many of whom were farmers. According to Foundation president Arthur Hill Diedrick, "Alain White was a very unpopular man in his time because he took what was productive farmland for conservation, and people said, 'Who is this pariah coming in and changing the environment?'"

By the end of their lives, Alain and May White had donated more than 5,700 acres of land as protected preserves to the State of Connecticut. These lands formed the backbone of the state's park system, and now comprise the Mohawk State Forest and Mohawk Mountain State Park, Kent Falls State Park, Macedonia Brook State Park, the People’s State Forest, Campbell Falls State Park, and portions of the Steep Rock Preserve.

Today, the family's estate is a 4,000-acre park open to the public. The family home, Whitehall, is the visitor center.

== Chess problem composer ==
Throughout his life, White was an avid chess problemist. He learned the game of chess at the age of 5.

"My father, the late John Jay White, was a keen and thorough solver," White wrote in his memoir. "And my ideas of chess strategy were picked up over the back of his chair. Thus I learned to solve problems with some facility early in 1891, at the age of 11."

As a problemist, White was deeply influenced by his father's friend, the problem solver and collector Russell Sage Jr. When Sage died, he left his collection of 5,000 chess problems to young Alain, who treasured it. This bequest formed the core of White's own collection; by the time he passed on control of this collection the mid-1920s, it comprised some 250,000 problems.

In 1914, White founded the Good Companions Chess Problem Club, to which many well-known problemists belonged, and published its eponymous journal.

In December 1905, White published his first compendium of challenging chess problems. Every year thereafter at Christmas-time, he would publish a similar volume and mail it to fellow enthusiasts around the world. He continued this custom until 1936, and his "Christmas Series" problem books were considered a must-have for chess problem solvers.

A number of anecdotal sources credit White with helping to crack a German naval code during World War One; the code was devised using chess moves as the base content of the messages, and White was one of a group of chess experts who helped to identify and decrypt their content. This story, while frequently shared, is difficult to source and may be apocryphal.

Through his dedication to composing and solving chess problems, White became a major figure in the chess community. When he died in April 1951, columnist Vincent Eaton wrote in Chess Life Magazine, "with his passing all those who cherish the tiny branch of the arts known as chess problems have lost their one great world figure."
