= Robert S. Anderson (entomologist) =

Canadian entomologist

- Education: University of Alberta; Carleton University; University of Toronto
- Scientific career
- Fields: Entomology
- Workplaces: Canadian Museum of Nature
- Author abbrev. (zoology): Anderson

Robert (Bob) S. Anderson is a Canadian entomologist who works as a research scientist at the Canadian Museum of Nature. Anderson's research focuses on weevil diversity and classification. Anderson has named over 250 species of weevils.

Anderson was featured by several news agencies for naming a species of weevil from the Dominican Republic, Sicoderus bautistai, after Dominican baseball player José Bautista. He has also named weevils after Canadian entomologist and father of Margaret Atwood, Carl Edmund Atwood (Metamasius atwoodi), as well as American country musician Kevin Fowler (Lymantes fowleri).

== Professional leadership ==
Anderson has served as the president, secretary, and a councilor for The Coleopterists Society. He has also acted as Director of the Canadian Museum of Natures's Beaty Centre for Species Discovery, and has served as adjunct professor at McGill University, and as research associate of the American Museum of Natural History and the University of Kansas.

== Bibliography ==
Anderson has contributed to over 150 scientific articles.

=== Books ===
- Anderson, Robert S. et al., 1985. The Insects and Arachnids of Canada, Part 13: The Carrion Beetles of Canada and Alaska. Publication #1778. Canadian Government Publishing Center.

=== Selected publications ===
- R. S. Anderson; Sforzi, A.; Bartolozzi, L Brentidae of the World (Coleoptera, Curculionoidea), Annals of the Entomological Society of America, Volume 99, Issue 6, November 2006, Pages 1261–1262.
