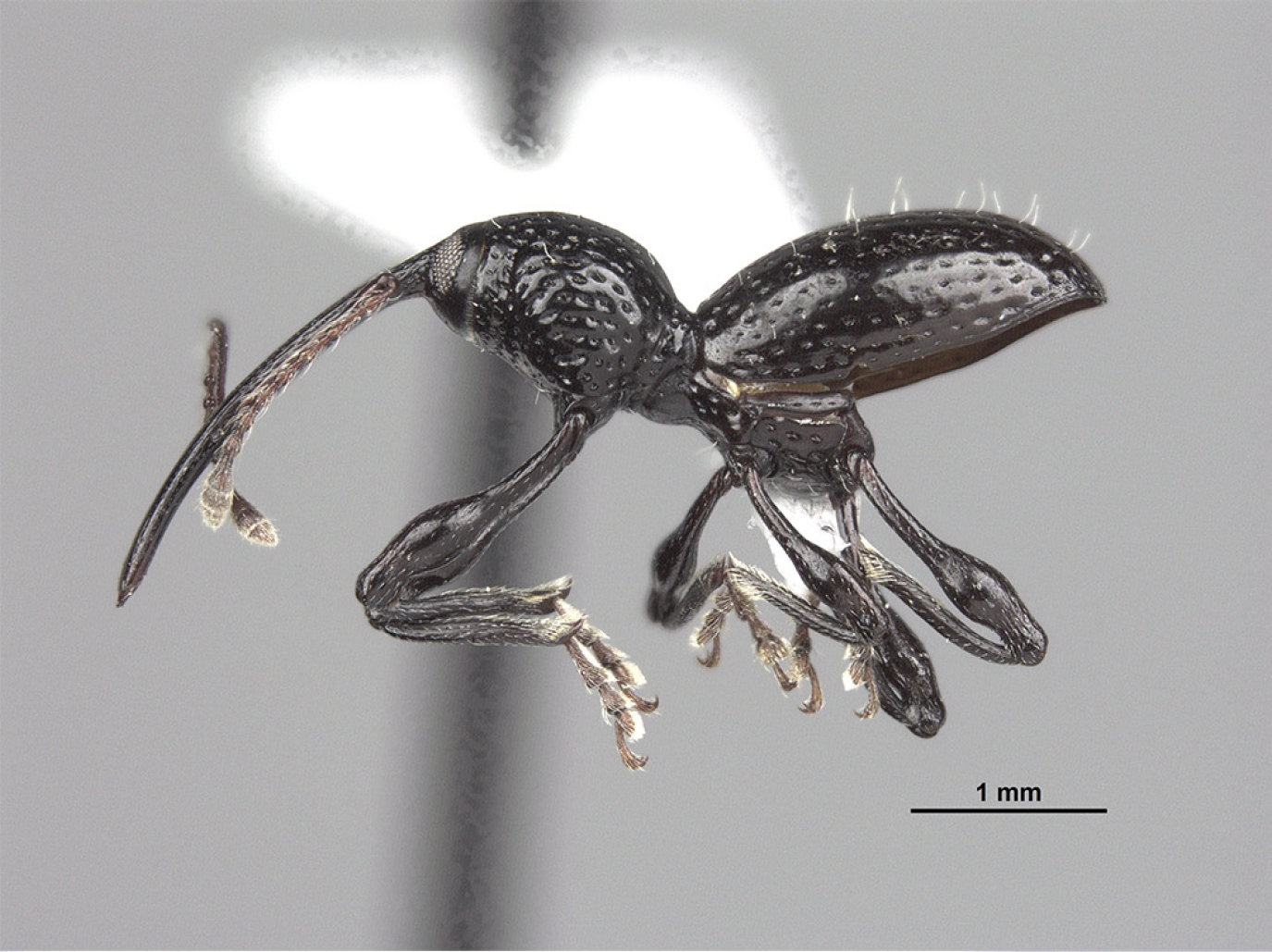

Scientific classification
- Kingdom: Animalia
- Phylum: Arthropoda
- Clade: Pancrustacea
- Class: Insecta
- Order: Coleoptera
- Suborder: Polyphaga
- Infraorder: Cucujiformia
- Superfamily: Curculionoidea
- Family: Curculionidae
- Genus: Sicoderus
- Species: S. bautistai

Binomial name
- Sicoderus bautistai Anderson, 2018

= Sicoderus bautistai =

Species of beetle

Sicoderus bautistai is a species of weevil in the genus Sicoderus indigenous to the island of Hispaniola. It is closely related to the species S. ramosi, S. guanyangi, and S. turnbowi. Its appearance has been described as similar to that of "black, shiny ants".

It is named for José Bautista, a Major League Baseball player from the Dominican Republic. The type specimen is a holotype collected at an elevation of 1,160 metres (3,810 ft) in Constanza. It was described as one of 18 new species of Sicoderus described in 2018 by entomologist Robert Anderson of the Canadian Museum of Nature.

== Etymology ==
Anderson describes the naming of the species as a "spur-of-the-moment decision" inspired by Bautista's bat flip after a home run in game 5 of the 2015 American League Division Series, around which time Anderson was in the process of describing a number of weevils from Hispaniola, and specifically the Dominican Republic.

When asked if some aspect of the species relates to Bautista, Anderson replied "Not really", and that the intention was to recognize Bautista's contribution to baseball in Canada. Anderson grew up a fan of Bautista's former team, the Toronto Blue Jays.

== Description ==
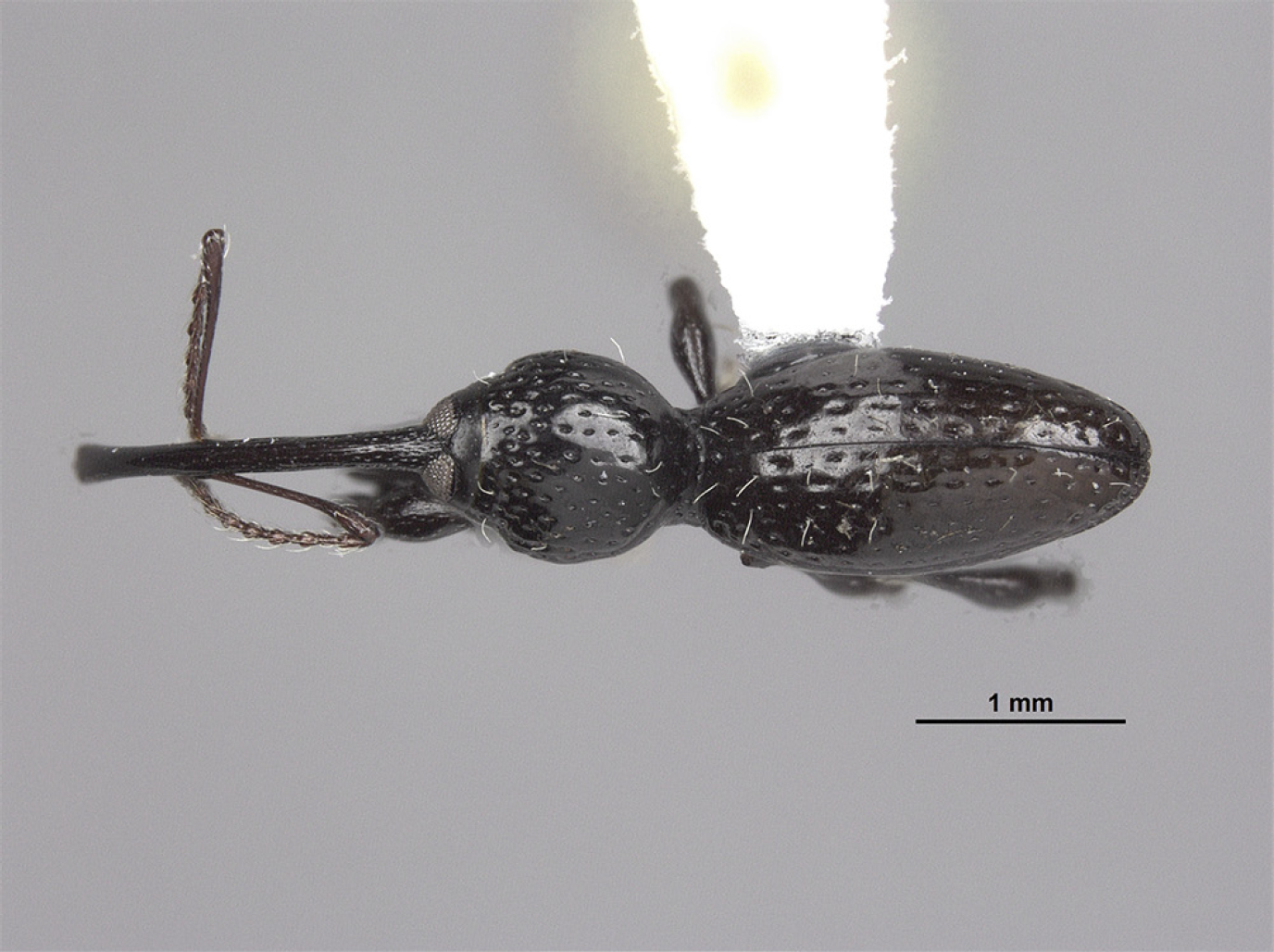
Dorsal view

Sicoderus bautistai inhabits forests of Hispaniola, typically associated with vine plants upon which they feed with a specialized long proboscis. The integumentary surface is black and shiny,

Adults achieve a length of up to 3.8 millimetres (0.15 in), with males at least 3.2 millimetres (0.13 in) and females at least 2.9 millimetres (0.11 in).

The antenna insertion point occurs at the middle in the rostrum in the female, and just beyond in the male. The rostrum is 1.00–1.08 times the length of the elytra in males, and 1.09–1.17 times in females. The eyes occur at the rostrum's midlength, separated by about one half its width. The globose prothorax is widest at the middle and characterized by very few large, deep punctures and erect setae scattered throughout. The elytra have numerous erect setae, and the humeri are non-angulate and fully reduced.

In males, the first ventrite has a small cluster of fine seta, but is not raised near the posterior margin. For the female, it is uniformly convex. The fifth ventrite in males has fine, shallow setae on an impression covering about one half its length, whereas the female's is uniformly convex. The male has an aedeagus whose internal sac has a pair of basal sclerites that are long, curved, and join at the anterior.

The profemora are very small with a dull tooth, whereas the mesofemora and metafemora do not have a tooth. Each tarsus has a basal tooth.

It can be distinguished from closely related species S. ramosi, S. guanyangi, and S. turnbowi by the presence and size of the femoral teeth, the structure of the first male ventrite, and the structure of the internal sac's basal sclerite in the male.
