= American Legion Forest CCC Shelter =

- U.S. National Register of Historic Places
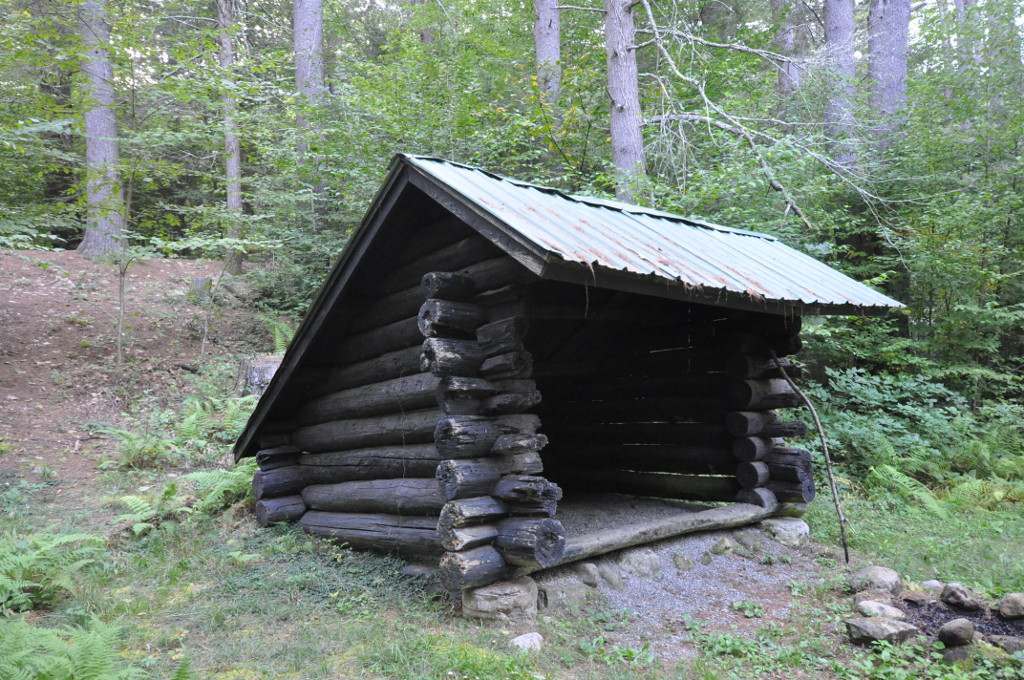

- Location within Connecticut Location within the United States
- Location: Loop 3 of group camping area, American Legion State Forest, Barkhamsted, Connecticut
- Coordinates: 41°56′25″N 73°0′53″W
- Area: 6.5 acres (2.6 ha)
- Built: 1935
- Architect: Civilian Conservation Corps
- Architectural style: Adirondack-Rustic
- MPS: Connecticut State Park and Forest Depression-Era Federal Work Relief Programs Structures TR
- NRHP reference No.: 86001725
- Added to NRHP: September 4, 1986

The American Legion Forest CCC Shelter is a historic rustic log shelter, located on the west side of West River Road within the American Legion State Forest in Barkhamsted, Connecticut. It is the only surviving one of four such structures in the area built by the Civilian Conservation Corps (CCC), and one of only two CCC-built shelters to survive in the state. The shelter was listed on the National Register of Historic Places in 1986.

== Description and history ==
The American Legion Forest CCC Shelter is located on loop three of the forest's group camping area, an area that is part of the former site of Camp White, the 1930s site of the CCC camp that improved the facilities of the forest. It is a three-side log structure set on stone piers, with a side gable roof that is short on the front and long on the back. It has a relatively low profile, providing little headroom to its occupants. Its roof, originally wood shingles, is now made of more modern materials.

The American Legion State Forest was established in 1927, as a gift to the state by the local chapter of the American Legion, and grew to reach more than 700 acres (280 ha) in the following decade. The forest was the site of CCC Camp White from 1933 until 1941. The crews were mostly involved with building roads and trails, but also built four of these shelters. This one was the only one located with the American Legion Forest; the other three, which have not survived, were located in Peoples State Forest, located across the West Branch Farmington River to the east. It is similar in form to the Cream Hill Shelter and Red Mountain Shelter, two other surviving shelters built by other CCC crews on what was then the route of the Appalachian Trail.

== See also ==
- National Register of Historic Places listings in Litchfield County, Connecticut
