= Mohawk State Forest =

State forest in Connecticut, United States

Mohawk Mountain State Forest State Park

- Location within Connecticut Location within the United States
- Location: Cornwall, Goshen and Litchfield, Connecticut, United States
- Coordinates: 41°49′17″N 73°17′48″W
- Area: 4,016 acres (1,625 ha); State park: 273 acres State forest: 3743 acres
- Elevation: 1,680 ft (510 m)
- Established: 1921
- Administrator: Connecticut Department of Energy and Environmental Protection
- Designation: Connecticut state park
- Website: Official website

Mohawk State Forest, also known as Mohawk State Forest/Mohawk Mountain State Park, encompasses over 4,000 acres (1,600 ha) in the towns of Cornwall, Goshen, and Litchfield in the southern Berkshires of Litchfield County, Connecticut. As overseen by the Connecticut Department of Energy and Environmental Protection, the area is used for hiking, picnicking, and winter sports by the public, while being actively managed to produce timber and other forest products.

== History ==
The forest bears the name of the Mohawk Indians, although the tribe did not live in the area. Historians believe the Tunxis and Paugussett used the mountain peak for signal fires that warned neighboring communities further south that Mohawks were approaching from the northwest.

Mohawk is the sixth oldest forest in the Connecticut state forest system. The forest's first five woodland acres were donated to the Connecticut State Park Commission by Andrew Clark in 1917 and were known as Mohawk Mountain Park until the 1920s. In 1921, Alain C. White donated another 250 acres with the White Memorial Foundation contributing a total of more than 2,900 acres (1,200 ha) of land.

Crews of Civilian Conservation Corps workers were active in the forest during the 1930s. Their work included the construction of roads that remain in use, the planting of hundreds of acres of trees, and the creation of breaks for fire control.

== Points of interest ==
Black Spruce Bog

One of the few bogs in the state, the 19-acre Black Spruce Bog is considered an outstanding example of a late stage peat bog. Plants such as sheep laurel, leatherleaf, sphagnum moss, sundew, and pitcher plant are found here, with white pine, black spruce, eastern hemlock, and tamarack comprising the overstory. The bog is accessed via a boardwalk designed to minimize the impact of visitors.

Cunningham Tower

An old, gutted stone tower stands along a trail in the northern section of the forest. It was constructed by Litchfield resident Seymour Cunningham after he bought land for sheep farming on Mohawk Mountain in 1912.

Mohawk Mountain

Mohawk Mountain (elev. 1683 feet) is the highest point on the blue-blazed Mattatuck Trail. The summit offers views of the Taconic Mountains and Berkshire Mountains to north and northwest including Bear Mountain, Canaan Mountain, and Cream Hill in Connecticut as well as peaks in Massachusetts (Race Mountain, Mount Everett, Mount Greylock) and the eastern Catskills in New York State.

Mohawk Pond

The southern section of the state forest encompasses Mohawk Pond, a 16-acre kettle pond stocked with trout and noted for largemouth bass. The pond has a maximum depth of 26 feet (8 m), an average depth of 15 feet (4.5 m), and a boat launch on its southern shore.

Red Mountain

Accessible on foot via the blue-blazed Mohawk Trail (a former alignment of the Appalachian Trail), Red Mountain (elev. 1652 feet) occupies the northernmost section of Mohawk State Forest. Its eastern slope is the site of the Red Mountain Shelter, a log cabin built by CCC crews based in Housatonic State Forest. Due to the shallow bedrock of the peak, the higher elevations of the mountain sport shrubby oak trees and distant vistas.

== Activities and amenities ==
The area offers hiking, picnicking, fishing and youth group camping, opportunities for leaf color viewing in fall, and cross-country skiing in winter. Skiers and snowboarders use the adjacent privately operated Mohawk Mountain Ski Area.
