= James Perry Wilson =

American painter

James Perry Wilson (August 13, 1889 - August 12, 1976) was an American, painter, designer, and architect best known for his natural history dioramas. Active for over 40 years, he is noted for his work with the American Museum of Natural History, the Peabody Museum of Natural History, and the Boston Museum of Science.

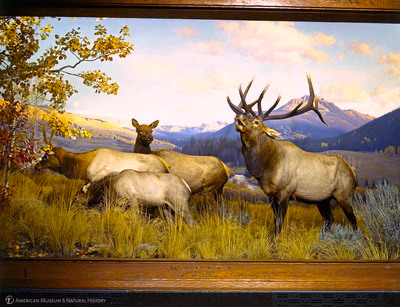
A diorama of an American Wapiti family group, with a background by Wilson, at the American Museum of Natural History.

== Life and career ==
James Perry Wilson was born in Newark, New Jersey, the youngest of six children only three of which lived into adulthood. Wilson attended Newark public schools. Even though he began painting early in his life, he never took formal painting classes, instead learning painting techniques from a family friend.

Wilson attended Columbia University, graduating with an architecture degree in 1914. Thereafter he found work as a draftsman and designer for the architectural firm, Bertram Goodhue Associates. Wilson's training as an architect influenced his diorama painting technique; he focused on careful observation of source material, illusionistic representation of three dimensions, and mathematical precision.

The Great Depression brought Wilson's architecture career to an end in 1932. In 1933 he met an employee of the American Museum of Natural History (AMNH), who encouraged him to show his landscape paintings to the director of diorama construction, James L. Clark. Clark was interested at once, but asked for the opinion of the diorama painter, William R. Leigh, who approved of Wilson's work. Wilson was subsequently hired in 1934 as an apprentice diorama painter at the AMNH. Wilson began working in the African Hall under Leigh's supervision, though Leigh severed his connection with the museum shortly thereafter, leaving Wilson responsible for subsequent dioramas. Wilson painted a total of eleven backgrounds in the African Hall of the American Museum of Natural History before moving to the North American Mammal Hall, where he painted several dioramas and established a reputation as a talented artist among the museum's administration.

During World War II, diorama work slowed at the AMNH. Wilson was given an 18-month leave of absence from 1944 to 1945 to paint three dioramas for the Yale Peabody Museum of Natural History. He returned to full-time work at the AMNH in 1946. From 1943 to 1955, Wilson wrote and illustrated a monthly astronomy article for a young adult audience in Junior Natural History Magazine, published by the AMNH and for the science series, "The World We Live In", published by "Life Magazine".

== Later career and death ==
In 1957, after painting thirty-eight dioramas at the AMNH, Wilson relocated to New Haven, Connecticut to paint four more dioramas for the Yale Peabody Museum of Natural History and one diorama at the White Memorial Foundation's nature center in Litchfield, Connecticut. The Canadian Museum of Nature hired him in 1963 through 1965 to paint four Canadian bird dioramas. Wilson worked at the Boston Museum of Science from 1966 to 1975. There, he painted six small New England dioramas and one miniature dinosaur diorama. He was welcomed as an artist in residence by the director, Bradford Washburn and the exhibit staff.

Wilson painted a total of 57 dioramas over a 42-year career in museums. He died in August, 1976.

== Style and technique ==
Wilson relied on substantial reference material when designing and painting a diorama background. He collected reference photographs from the specific locations he intended to depict, in addition to painted color references. When asked why he didn't use photographs exclusively, he replied, "Because you can't rely on photographs, even the best color film, to record the color exactly as the eye sees it. Color film tends to increase contrast. So I use my field paintings as an over-all check." Wilson sought to remove the artist's subjective emotional interpretation by letting his many references guide his brush. He transformed the prevailing subjective practice of oil painting by aligning painting aesthetics with science's fact-based intentions for the dioramas. Wilson sought to make the artist transparent. In his own words derived from Latin, ars celare artem, ("art conceals art"). His work is characterized by a desire to imitate nature so closely that his work is seen as depicting actuality. His colleague, Ray deLucia recalled "the look on his face when someone questioned an effect he had included in a background painting. It was not a look of anger but more of disbelief that his conclusion should be doubted."

== Personal life ==
Wilson was a lifelong bachelor. The prominent bird artist, Louis Agassiz Fuertes (1874-1927), was Wilson's first cousin.

In his spare time between diorama work, Wilson created geometric paper constructions of multi-faceted polyhedra.

== Notable works ==
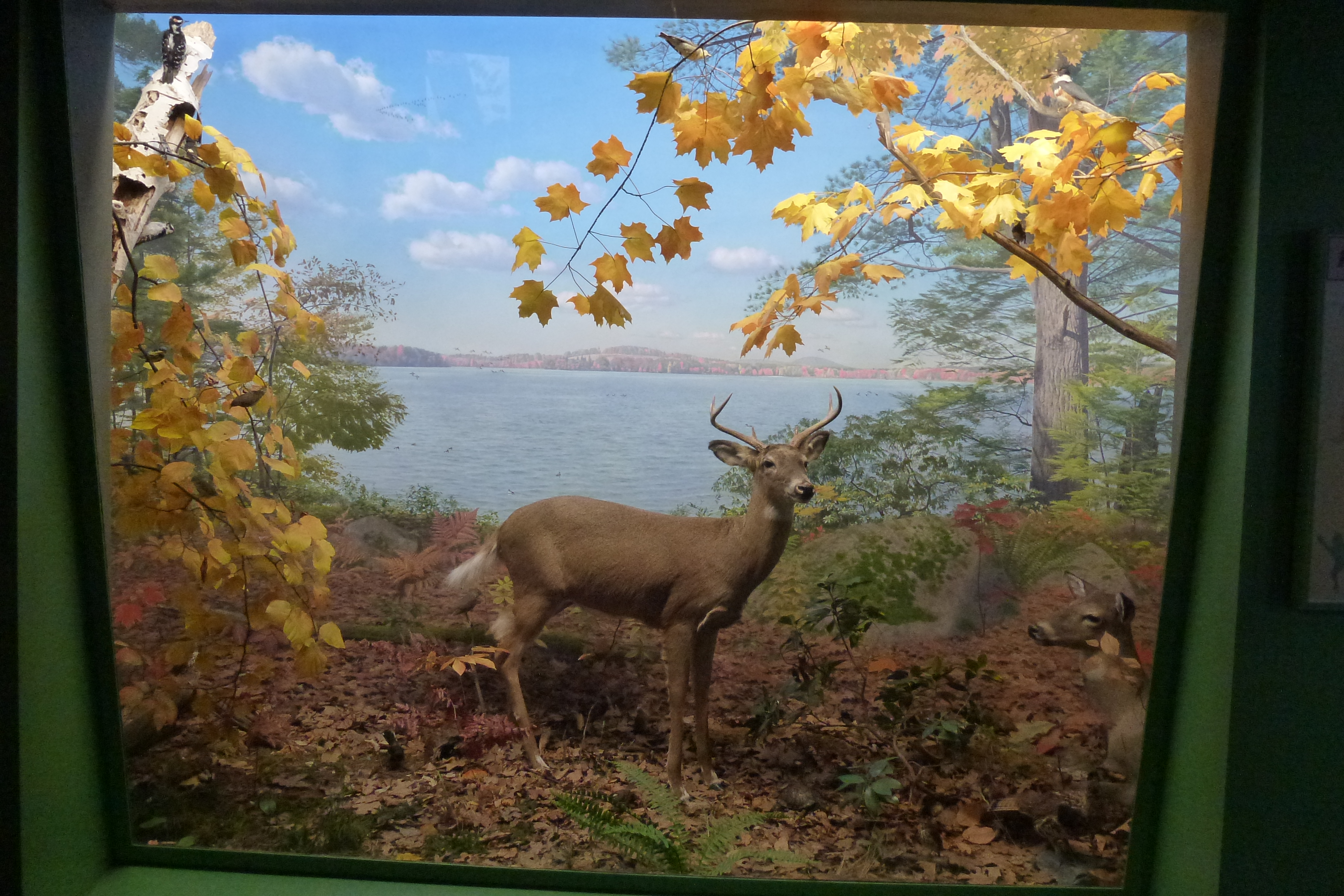
A diorama with background by Wilson at the White Memorial Foundation Conservation Center

- The American Museum of Natural History:
  - African Hall, 1934-1944
  - North American Mammal Hall, 1934-1944
- The Peabody Museum of Natural History:
  - Connecticut Shoreline, 1946
  - Bog
  - Fall
  - Canadian Rockies
  - Desert
  - Everglades
  - Tropical Rainforest
- The Boston Museum of Science:
  - Woodchuck
  - Twilight in Vermont
  - Racoon
  - Red Fox
  - Chipmunk
  - Varying Hare
  - Tyrannosaurus Rex
  - Lobster Fishing
  - Primate PTG
- Canadian Museum of Nature
  - Sage Grouse
  - Point Pelee
  - Hawk Migration, Lake Erie
- White Memorial Foundation Conservation Center
