= Red Mountain Shelter =

- U.S. National Register of Historic Places
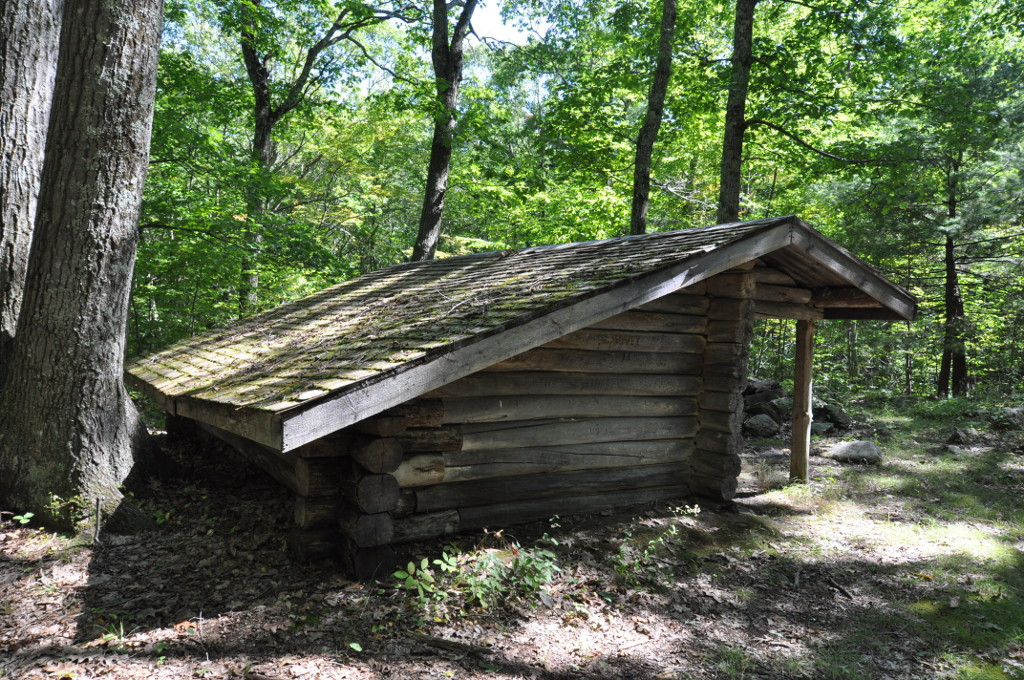

- Location within Connecticut Location within the United States
- Location: North Side of CT 4 in Mohawk State Forest, Cornwall, Connecticut
- Coordinates: 41°50′50″N 73°17′15″W
- Area: 6.5 acres (2.6 ha)
- Built: 1934
- Built by: Civilian Conservation Corps
- Architectural style: Adirondack-rustic
- MPS: Connecticut State Park and Forest Depression-Era Federal Work Relief Programs Structures TR
- NRHP reference No.: 86001740
- Added to NRHP: September 4, 1986

The Red Mountain Shelter is a historic rustic log shelter in Mohawk State Forest in Cornwall, Connecticut. Built in 1934, it is one three surviving log shelters constructed by the Civilian Conservation Corps in Connecticut. It was listed on the National Register of Historic Places in 1986.

== Description and history ==
The Red Mountain Shelter is located on the eastern slope of Red Mountain, a 1,652-foot (504 m) hill in the northern part of Mohawk State Forest in eastern Cornwall. It is located along a blue-blazed trail that is a former alignment of the Appalachian Trail, north of Connecticut Route 4. It is a small log structure, with a gabled roof and dry-laid fieldstone foundation. The rectangular structure, open on one side, is built out of saddle-notched logs, with a milled lumber sill at the base of the opening for stability.

The shelter was built in 1934 by a crew of the CCC based at Camp Cross, which was located in Housatonic State Forest. Crews from the same camp also built the Cream Hill Shelter in northern Cornwall. These two shelters were both located along what was then the route of the Appalachian Trail, but has since been rerouted further west. The Trail had been laid through the area by the state in 1930-33, and the CCC crews (active from 1933 to 1941) were responsible for opening this area of the forest to further recreational use. A similar shelter to this one, located south of CT 4, was destroyed by fire c. 1977.

== See also ==
- National Register of Historic Places listings in Litchfield County, Connecticut
