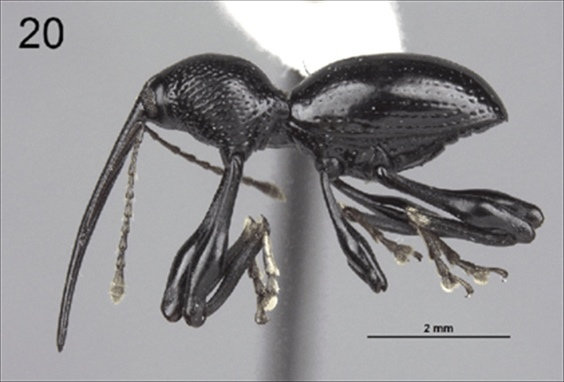
- Sicoderus contiguous

Scientific classification
- Kingdom: Animalia
- Phylum: Arthropoda
- Class: Insecta
- Order: Coleoptera
- Suborder: Polyphaga
- Infraorder: Cucujiformia
- Family: Curculionidae
- Subfamily: Curculioninae
- Genus: Sicoderus; Vanin, 1986

Species
- See text

= Sicoderus =

Genus of beetles

Sicoderus is a genus of true weevils in the beetle family Curculionidae. There are more than 75 described species in Sicoderus.

== Species ==
These species belong to the genus Sicoderus:

- Sicoderus abbreviatus Vanin, 1986
- Sicoderus aeneus Anderson, 2018
- Sicoderus alternatus Anderson, 2018
- Sicoderus analis Vanin, 1986
- Sicoderus angustatus Vanin, 1986
- Sicoderus antilope Vanin, 1986
- Sicoderus apicalis Vanin, 1986
- Sicoderus appendiculatus Vanin, 1986
- Sicoderus bautistai Anderson, 2018
- Sicoderus beatyi Anderson, 2018
- Sicoderus bicolor Vanin, 1986
- Sicoderus bipunctiventris Anderson, 2018
- Sicoderus bolivianus Vanin, 1986
- Sicoderus bondari Vanin, 1986
- Sicoderus brevirostris Vanin, 1986
- Sicoderus caladeler Anderson, 2018
- Sicoderus castaneus Vanin, 1986
- Sicoderus championi Vanin, 1986
- Sicoderus ciconia Vanin, 1986
- Sicoderus contiguus Vanin, 1986
- Sicoderus convexipennis Vanin, 1986
- Sicoderus coroni Vanin, 1986
- Sicoderus cracens Vanin, 1986
- Sicoderus delauneyi Vanin, 1986
- Sicoderus delusor Vanin, 1986
- Sicoderus detonnancouri Anderson, 2018
- Sicoderus disjunctus Vanin, 1986
- Sicoderus distinguendus Vanin, 1986
- Sicoderus exilis Vanin, 1986
- Sicoderus franzi Anderson, 2018
- Sicoderus globulicollis Vanin, 1986
- Sicoderus gracilis Vanin, 1986
- Sicoderus granatensis Vanin, 1986
- Sicoderus guanyangi Anderson, 2018
- Sicoderus guyanensis Vanin, 1986
- Sicoderus hamburgi Vanin, 1986
- Sicoderus hirsutiventris Anderson, 1999
- Sicoderus hirsutus Vanin, 1986
- Sicoderus humeralis Anderson, 2018
- Sicoderus ibis Vanin, 1986
- Sicoderus inermis Vanin, 1986
- Sicoderus insidiosus Vanin, 1986
- Sicoderus ivieorum Anderson, 1999
- Sicoderus labidus Vanin, 1986
- Sicoderus laevigatus Vanin, 1986
- Sicoderus lamellatus Vanin, 1986
- Sicoderus latifrons Vanin, 1986
- Sicoderus longirostris Vanin, 1986
- Sicoderus lucidus Anderson, 2018
- Sicoderus marshalli Vanin, 1986
- Sicoderus matuete Vanin, 1986
- Sicoderus medranae Anderson, 2018
- Sicoderus mollicomus Vanin, 1986
- Sicoderus morio Vanin, 1986
- Sicoderus nodieri Vanin, 1986
- Sicoderus parallelus Vanin, 1986
- Sicoderus perezi Anderson, 2018
- Sicoderus perpolitus Vanin, 1986
- Sicoderus petilus Vanin, 1986
- Sicoderus prolatus Vanin, 1986
- Sicoderus propinquus Vanin, 1986
- Sicoderus pseudostriatolateralis Anderson, 2018
- Sicoderus ramosi Vanin, 1986
- Sicoderus remotus Vanin, 1986
- Sicoderus robini Vanin, 2013
- Sicoderus schoenherri Vanin, 1986
- Sicoderus sleeperi Vanin, 1986
- Sicoderus striatolateralis Anderson, 2018
- Sicoderus subcoronatus Vanin, 1986
- Sicoderus thomasi Anderson, 2018
- Sicoderus tinamus (LeConte, 1884)
- Sicoderus tringa Vanin, 1986
- Sicoderus truncatipennis Vanin, 1986
- Sicoderus tumidipectus Vanin, 1986
- Sicoderus turnbowi Anderson, 2018
- Sicoderus vanini Anderson, 1999
- Sicoderus ventricosus Vanin, 1986
- Sicoderus woodruffi Anderson, 2018
