= White Memorial Conservation Center =

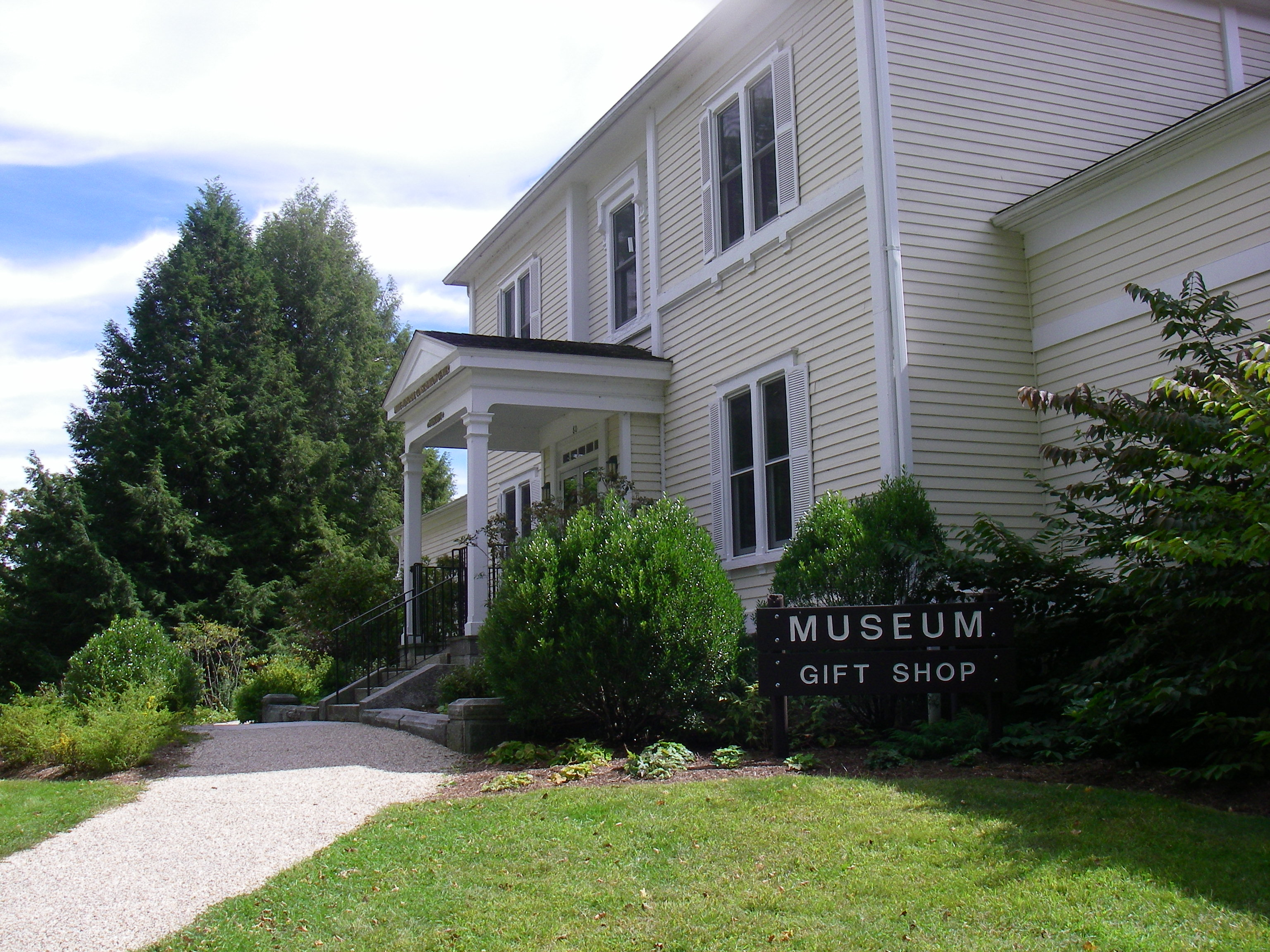
- The exterior of the White Memorial Conservation Center museum, Litchfield, Connecticut
- Founded: 1964
- Founder: White Memorial Foundation
- Type: 501(c)(3) non-for profit organization
- Purpose: Environmental education, conservation, research, recreation
- Location: 80 Whitehall Road, Litchfield, Connecticut
- Coordinates: 41.721°N 73.217°W
- Members: 1,700.
- Key people: Alain White, May White, Gordon Loery
- Website: whitememorialcc.org
- Formerly called: Litchfield Nature Center and Museum

The White Memorial Conservation Center is a natural history museum and nature center in Litchfield, Connecticut, United States, supported by the White Memorial Foundation. The museum is currently housed in Whitehall, the former residence of White Memorial Foundation founders Alain and May White.

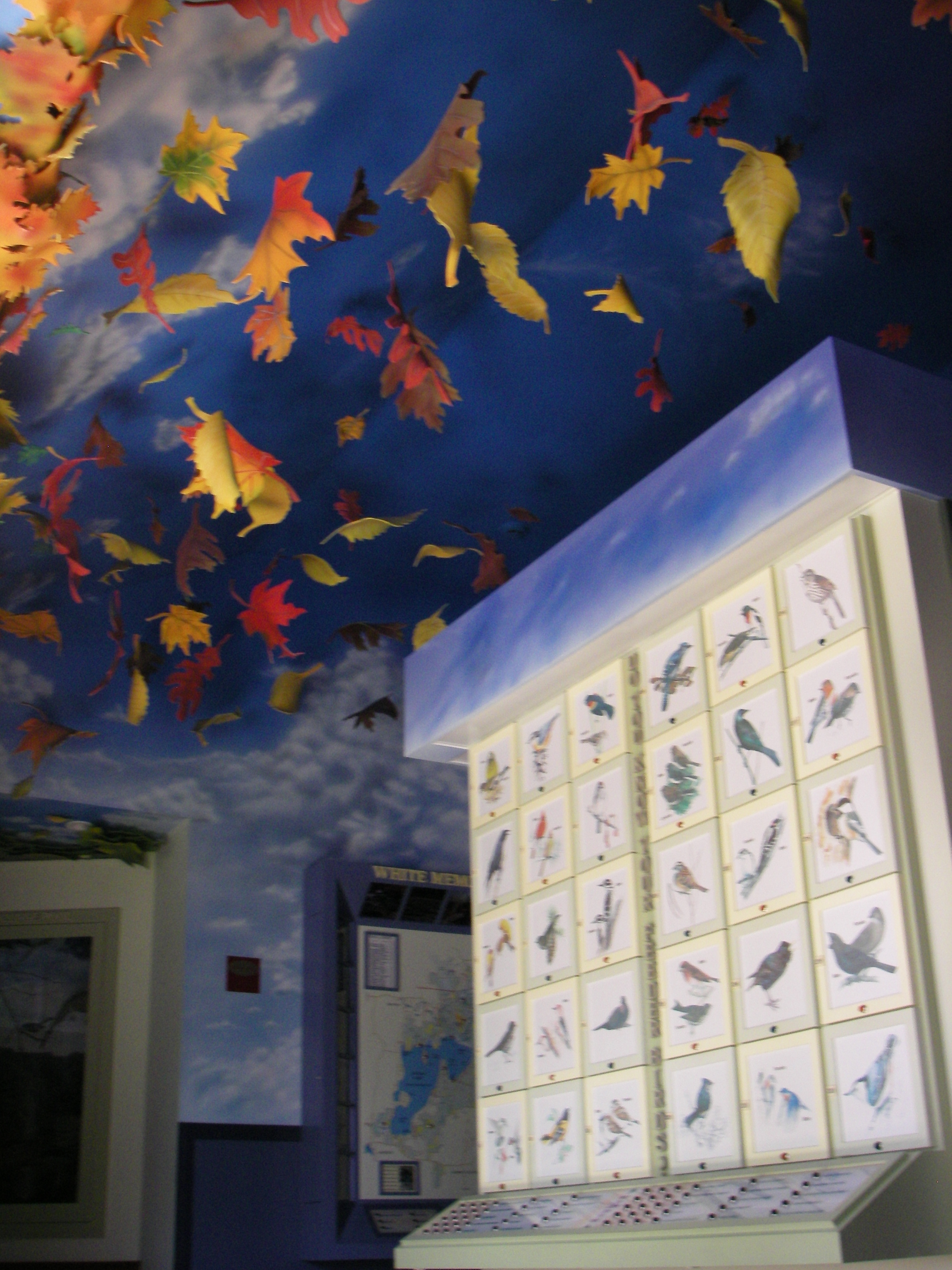
White Memorial Conservation Center

== Facilities ==
=== Museum ===
==== Human history ====
The museum outlines the impact humans have had on the region, beginning with the Peantam group of the Potatuck tribe, the growth and decline of European-American agriculture, and the legacy of Alain and May White.

==== Habitats ====
There are various displays of common animals found in some of the habitats on White Memorial Foundation property, including fields, wetlands, lakes, old-growth forests, hardwood forests, and backyard habitats. Several displays were designed by American diorama painter and designer, James Perry Wilson, who also designed dioramas for the American Museum of Natural History's Hall of Mammals.

==== Children's Corner ====
The Children's Corner has books, games, and toys designed to teach youngsters about the natural environment. There are also several interactive identification quizzes.

==== Live Animal Exhibits ====
The museum features a working honeybee hive, several live reptiles, and a birdfeeder viewing area. There is also an outside area where visitors can see Barred Owls and Red-tailed Hawks that are unable to survive in the wild.

==== Miscellaneous ====
Other museum areas include:

- a cross-section of a beaver lodge
- an overview map of White Memorial Foundation Property
- an explanation of the taxidermy process
- land gifts of the White Memorial Foundation to the State of Connecticut and other organizations
- fluorescent rock cave
- gift shop

=== Carriage House ===
Originally built in the 1870s, the Carriage House is now renovated and includes an auditorium, kitchen, and two dormitories. The public can reserve the Carriage House for use.

=== Mott-Van Winkle Center ===
The Mott-Van Winkle Center, built in 1984, includes two buildings used for environmental education and public events.

== Research and Conservation ==
The White Memorial Conservation Center has been involved in a wide variety of research and conservation studies, ranging from limnology and forestry to ornithology and ichthyology. The Center has partnered with outside groups such as the Connecticut Agricultural Experiment Station, the State of Connecticut Department of Energy and Environmental Protection, Yale University, and the University of Connecticut, in addition to research conducted solely by Center staff.

Currently, the Conservation Center is involved in New England cottontail management, invasive species control, and breeding bird censuses, among many other projects. The Center maintains the Research and Conservation Blog to keep the public up to date on current research and conservation projects.

== Education ==
Environmental education programs are held year-round for both children and adults. School field trips, presentations in schools and week-long summer programs form a key part of education for children. Adults can attend various workshops, guest speaker presentations, and guided walks.

Educational topics range from studies of pond life to animal adaptations to geology, and often involve a hands-on approach. Guided walks tend to focus on specific habitats or groups of animals found on the property. While many of the educational programs occur on White Memorial Foundation property, others (including summer classes for older students) involve trips to locales across Northwestern Connecticut so participants can see the larger picture of ecosystems, geology, and landforms.

An important component of White Memorial's educational outreach is the Sixth Grade Conservation Education Program. Since 1965, White Memorial's education director has visited sixth grade classes in Litchfield, Warren, Morris, and Goshen five times each spring to teach students about geology, trees, biodiversity, and other relevant topics.

White Memorial's education program has gained notoriety throughout the years. Education Director Jeff Greenwood has been named among Litchfield County's Top 50 Influential People by the Litchfield County Times.

== See also ==
- White Memorial Foundation
