= Kent Falls State Park =

State park in Litchfield County, Connecticut

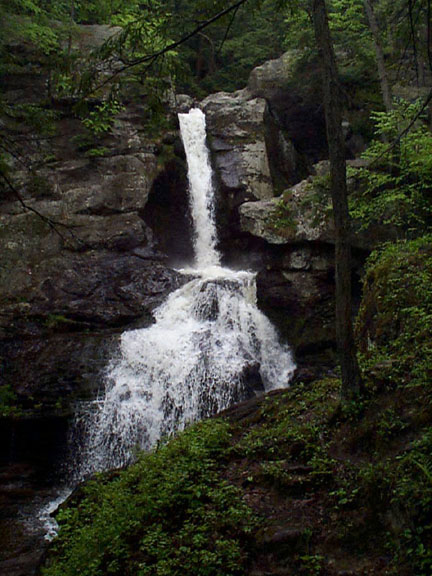
- Kent Falls

- Location within Connecticut Location within the United States
- Location: Kent, Connecticut, United States
- Coordinates: 41°46′37″N 73°25′09″W
- Area: 307 acres (124 ha)
- Elevation: 794 ft (242 m)
- Established: 1919
- Administrator: Connecticut Department of Energy and Environmental Protection
- Designation: Connecticut state park
- Website: Official website
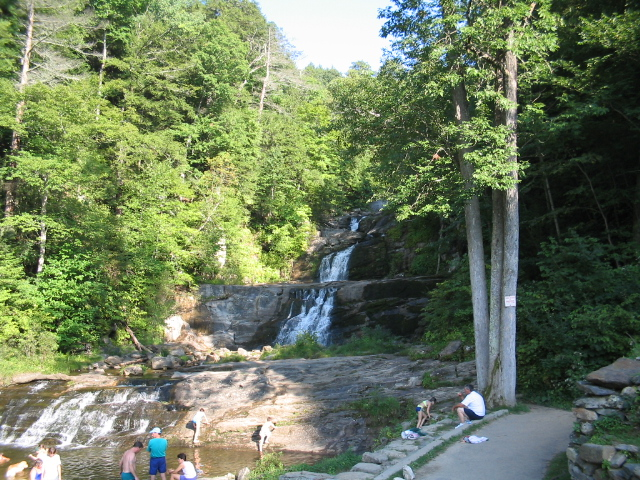
- Lower Kent Falls
- Interactive map of Kent Falls
- Location: Kent, Connecticut, United States
- Type: Multi-step
- Total height: 250 ft (76 m)
- Number of drops: 6 or more
- Longest drop: 70 ft (21 m)

Kent Falls State Park is a public recreation area located in the town of Kent, Connecticut, within the Litchfield Hills region of the southern Berkshires. The state park is home to Kent Falls, a series of waterfalls on Falls Brook, a tributary of the Housatonic River. The falls drop 250 feet (76 m) in under a quarter mile. The largest cascade drops more than 70 feet (21 m) into a reflecting pool, before traveling over the lesser falls.

== History ==
The Indian name of the falls is Scatacook, and there is evidence that the area was used by Native Americans for fishing and camping. Mills stood along the brook during colonial times. Kent Falls was established as a state park after 200 acres (81 ha) of land was given to the state in 1919 as a gift from philanthropist Alain C. White through his White Memorial Foundation. Workers with the Civil Works Administration contributed to the park's development in the 1930s. In the 1970s, trail reconstruction was done by the Youth Conservation Corps of America.

In 2006, observation platforms were constructed along a trail next to the falls; at the base of the falls, a terraced observation area paved with native flag stones was created to allow access to a calm-water wading pool.

== Activities and amenities ==
The park has a replica of a covered bridge that allows visitors to cross the brook and access the falls. In addition to its scenery, the park offers hiking, fishing, and picnicking.

== See also ==
- List of waterfalls
