= Sicoderus tinamus =

Scientific classification
- Kingdom: Animalia
- Phylum: Arthropoda
- Class: Insecta
- Order: Coleoptera
- Suborder: Polyphaga
- Infraorder: Cucujiformia
- Family: Curculionidae
- Genus: Sicoderus
- Species: S. tinamus

Binomial name
- Sicoderus tinamus (LeConte, 1884)

Synonyms
- Erodiscus cazieri Sleeper, 1954

Species of beetle

Sicoderus tinamus is a species of true weevil in the beetle family Curculionidae. It is found in North America.
