= Canadian Museum of Nature =

Natural history museum in Ontario, Canada

- Musée canadien de la nature
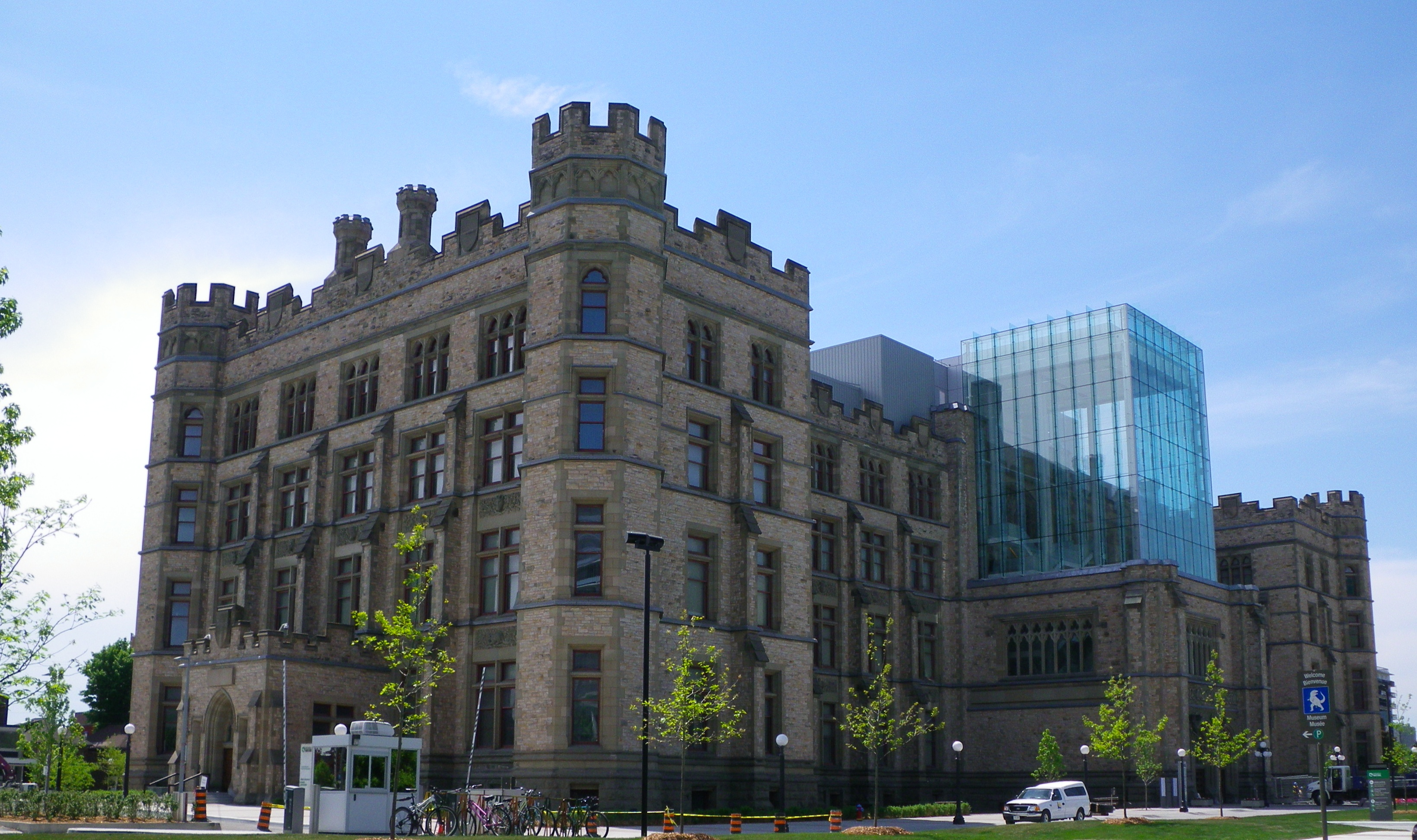
- Exterior of the Victoria Memorial Museum Building
- Established: 1856 (Note: The following year was when the Geological Museum (later renamed the National Museum of Canada) was formed by the Geological Survey of Canada, through an Act of the Legislative Assembly of the Province of Canada. In 1968, the National Museum of Canada was split into several national institutions, with the National Museum's Natural History Department forming the National Museum of Natural Sciences. The National Museum of Natural Sciences was later renamed the Canadian Museum of Nature in 1990.)
- Location: 240 McLeod Street, Ottawa, Ontario, Canada 1740 Chemin Pink, Gatineau, Quebec, Canada (Note: The institution operates two facilities in Canada's National Capital Region. The Victoria Memorial Museum Building in Ottawa houses the museum's exhibitions, whereas the Natural Heritage Campus in Gatineau serves as the museum's administrative, research, and storage facility.)
- Coordinates: 45.41266°N 75.68875°W
- Type: Natural history museum
- Visitors: 461,797 (FY2018–19)
- President: Danika Goosney
- Chairperson: Karen Dodds
- Curator: Jean-Marc Gagnon (Chief Scientist)
- Website: nature.ca

The Canadian Museum of Nature (French: Musée canadien de la nature; CMN) is a national natural history museum based in Canada's National Capital Region. The museum's exhibitions and public programs are housed in the Victoria Memorial Museum Building, a 18,910-square-metre structure (203,500 sq ft) in Ottawa, Ontario. The museum's administrative offices and scientific centres are housed at a separate location, the Natural Heritage Campus, in Gatineau, Quebec.

The museum originated from a museum established by the Geological Survey of Canada in 1856. Initially based in Montreal, the museum relocated to downtown Ottawa in 1881. In 1911, the museum relocated to the Victoria Memorial Museum Building. Initially, a natural history museum, the institution later expanded to include an anthropology and human history department; with the institution renamed the National Museum of Canada in 1927. The departments of the national museum were later split into separate national institutions, with the natural history department forming the National Museum of Natural Sciences in 1968. The museum adopted its current name in 1990 after it was made its own autonomous crown corporation. From 2004 to 2010, the museum renovated and expanded the Victoria Memorial Museum Building.

The museum's collection contains over 14.6 million specimens of the natural world, several of which are displayed in its permanent exhibitions. The museum also hosts and organizes several travelling exhibitions and supports and conducts several research programs relating to natural history.

== History ==
=== Early museum (1856–1968) ===
The Canadian Museum of Nature originates from the collecting efforts of the Geological Survey of Canada (GSC), an organization established in 1842 in Montreal. In 1856 the Legislative Assembly of the Province of Canada passed an act that enabled the GSC to establish a museum to exhibit items found from its geological and archaeological field trips; with the museum initially established in Montreal. In 1877, the museum mandate was formally expanded to include the study of modern fauna and flora, in addition to human history, languages, and traditions.

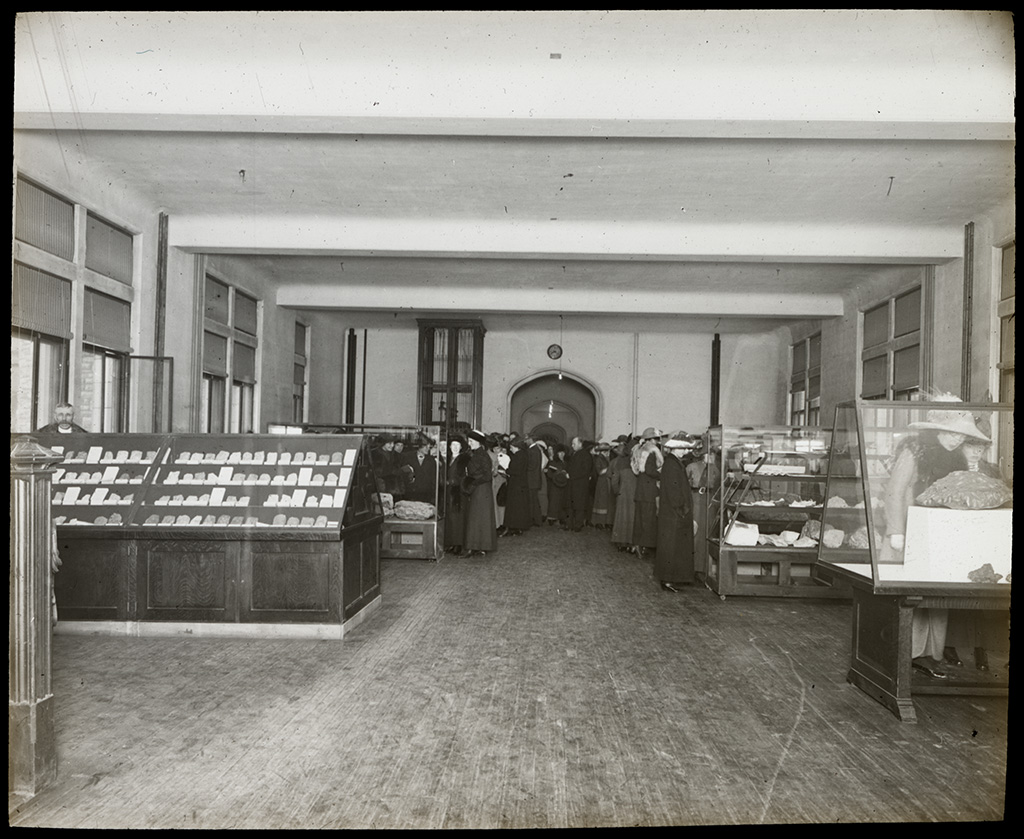
Visitors examine mineral displays at the museum in 1912

In 1881, the museum relocated from Montreal to downtown Ottawa; although space in the new facility soon proved to be inadequate, with the Royal Society of Canada petitioning the federal government to build a new building for the museum by 1896. Preliminary plans for a new building were drawn up by 1899, although work on the building did not begin until 1906. In the following year, management of the museum was assumed by the Department of Mines, with the mandate formally expanded to include anthropological studies. The new museum building, the Victoria Memorial building, was also completed in 1910, although it was not opened to the public until 1912. In 1927, the museum division of the Department of Mines was renamed the National Museum of Canada; with the museum formally split from the GSC.

Management of the National Museum was transferred from the Department of Mines to the Department of Resources and Development in 1950. In 1956, the museum was split into two branches, one focused on natural history and another on anthropology. The mandate of the museum was later expanded when the National Museum of Canada assumed management of the Canadian War Museum in 1958. A history division was established within the museum's anthropology branch in 1964.

=== Natural History Museum (1968–present) ===
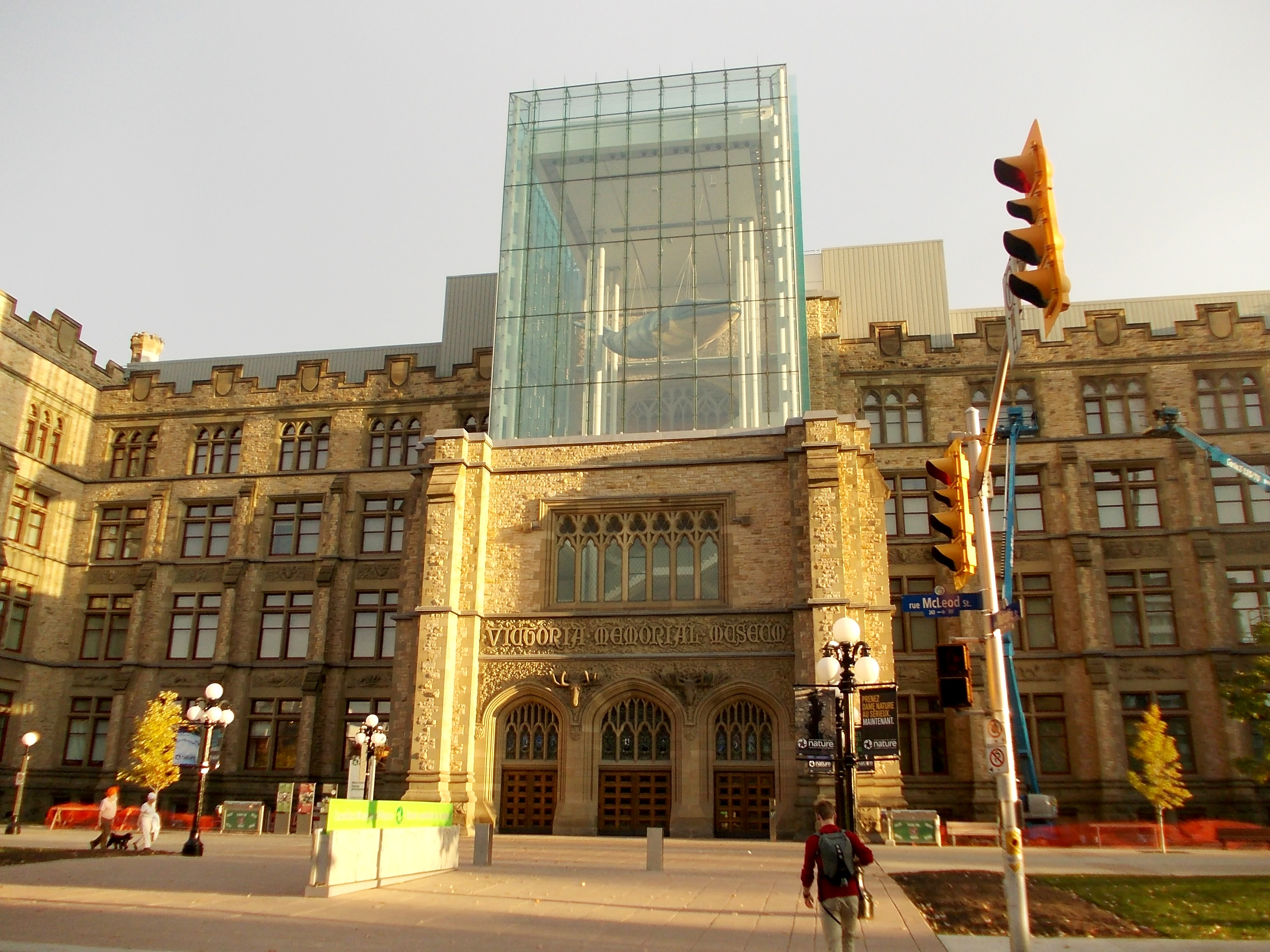
Exterior of the Queen's Lantern

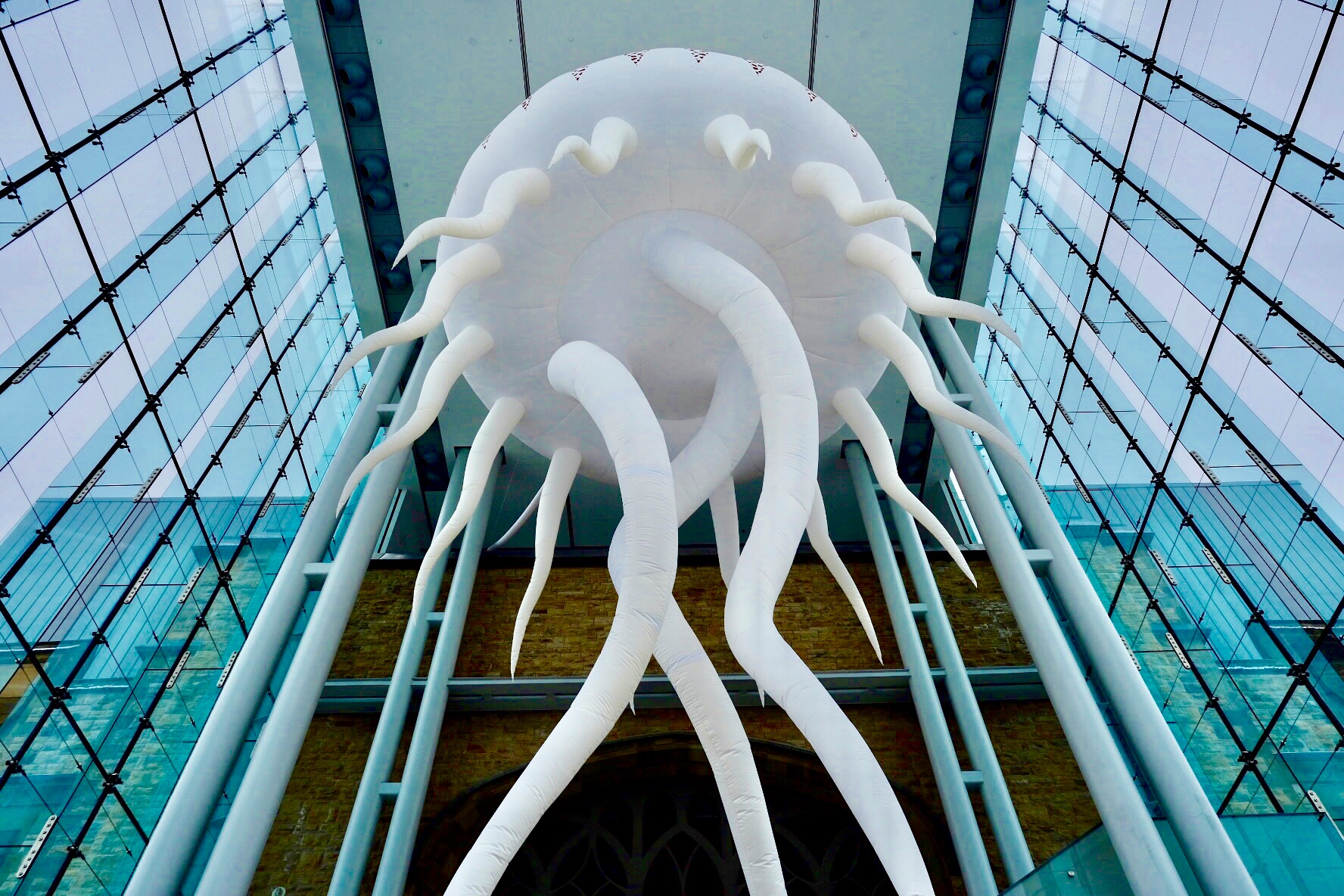
Interior of the Queen's Lantern

The Queen's Lantern at the entrance of the Victoria Memorial building. The glass tower was built during the building's 2004–2010 expansion.

In 1968, the branches of the National Museum of Canada were split into separate museums. The Canadian Museum of Nature originated from the natural history branch of the museum, initially incorporated as the National Museum of Natural Sciences. The anthropological and human history branch of the former National Museum of Canada became the National Museum of Man (later renamed the Canadian Museum of Civilization in 1988, and the Canadian Museum of History in 2013), while the science and technology branch became the National Museum of Science and Technology (later renamed the Canada Science and Technology Museum). In the same year, the National Museums of Canada Corporation (NMC) was formed to serve as an umbrella organization for the national museums, as well as provide support and administrative units for the museums. The National Museum of Natural Sciences formed a part of the NMC until the organization was dissolved in 1988.

In 1990, the government of Canada passed the Museums Act, which led to the National Museum of Natural Sciences and several national museums being incorporated as autonomous crown corporations. The same act also renamed the National Museum of Natural Sciences into the Canadian Museum of Nature. By 1990, the museum was the only remaining occupant of the Victoria Memorial building. In 1997, the museum opened a new research and collections facility in Gatineau, Quebec, consolidating its research facilities and collections holdings in one building.

Between 2004 and 2010, the federal government spent approximately C$216 million dollars on expanding and renovating the Canadian Museum of Nature. Construction for the rehabilitation project was done in phases, with large portions of the existing structure removed and demolished for renovations. On 22 May 2010, International Day for Biological Diversity, the museum building was reopened to the public. The building's glass tower, or the Queens' Lantern, was dedicated in honour of Queens Victoria and Elizabeth II, with the latter attending the tower's dedication ceremony in June 2010.

== Facilities ==
The Canadian Museum of Nature operates two facilities. The Victoria Memorial Museum Building in Ottawa houses the museum's exhibitions and public programs, while its administrative, research and collections facility is situated at the Natural Heritage Centre in Gatineau.

=== Victoria Memorial Museum Building ===
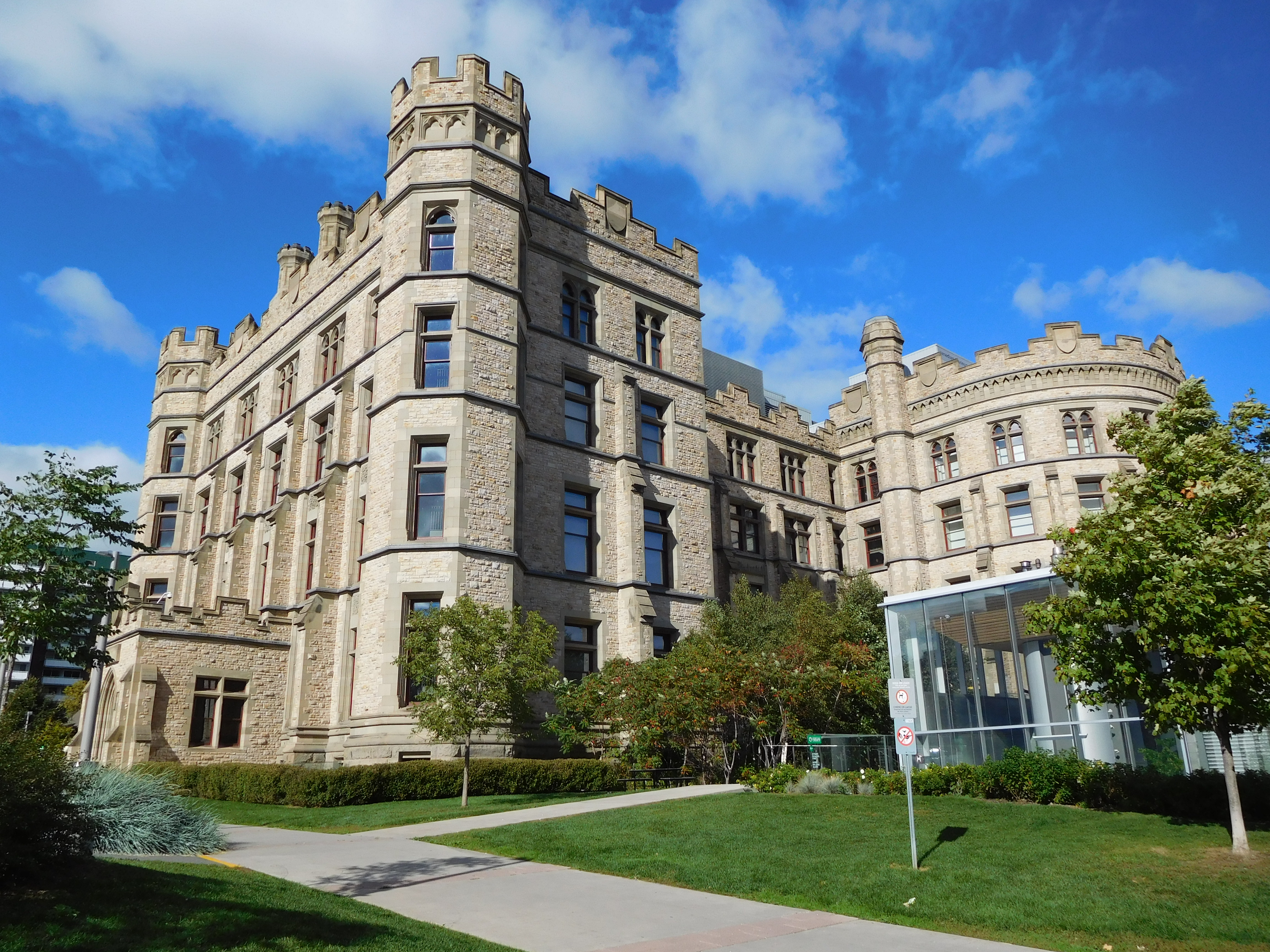
The Victoria Memorial Museum Building from Argyle Avenue. The building houses the museum's exhibitions and other programs.

The Victoria Memorial Museum Building in Ottawa houses the museum's exhibitions and galleries and other public programs operated by the museum. The building is located on a 3.6 hectares (8.9 acres) property is located in Centretown, a neighbourhood of Ottawa. Situated approximately 1.6 kilometres (0.99 mi) south of Centre Block on Parliament Hill, the building was initially designed to mirror the Canadian Parliament Buildings as a part of a larger envisioned planned capital. The property is surrounded by several roadways including O'Connor Street to the west, and Metcalfe Street to the east. Metcalfe Street's southern and northern portions also terminate north and south of the building as it detours to the east of the property.

The building is the first purpose-built federal museum building erected in Canada. The federal government authorized the construction of the building in 1901, in honour of Queen Victoria; with construction for the building taking place between 1905 and 1911. After its completion, the building housed the national museums, in addition to the National Gallery of Canada from 1911 to 1959. The building's auditorium also housed the Ottawa Little Theatre until 1916. The theatre company was forced to vacate the space after a fire ravaged Centre Block, forcing the temporary relocation of the parliament to the building until 1920. The Canadian Museum of Nature became the building's sole occupant after the Canadian Museum of Civilization relocated to another facility in 1988. On 23 February 1990, the building was designated as a National Historic Site of Canada, given the building's importance to the development of museology in Canada, as well as for its architecture.

==== Design ====
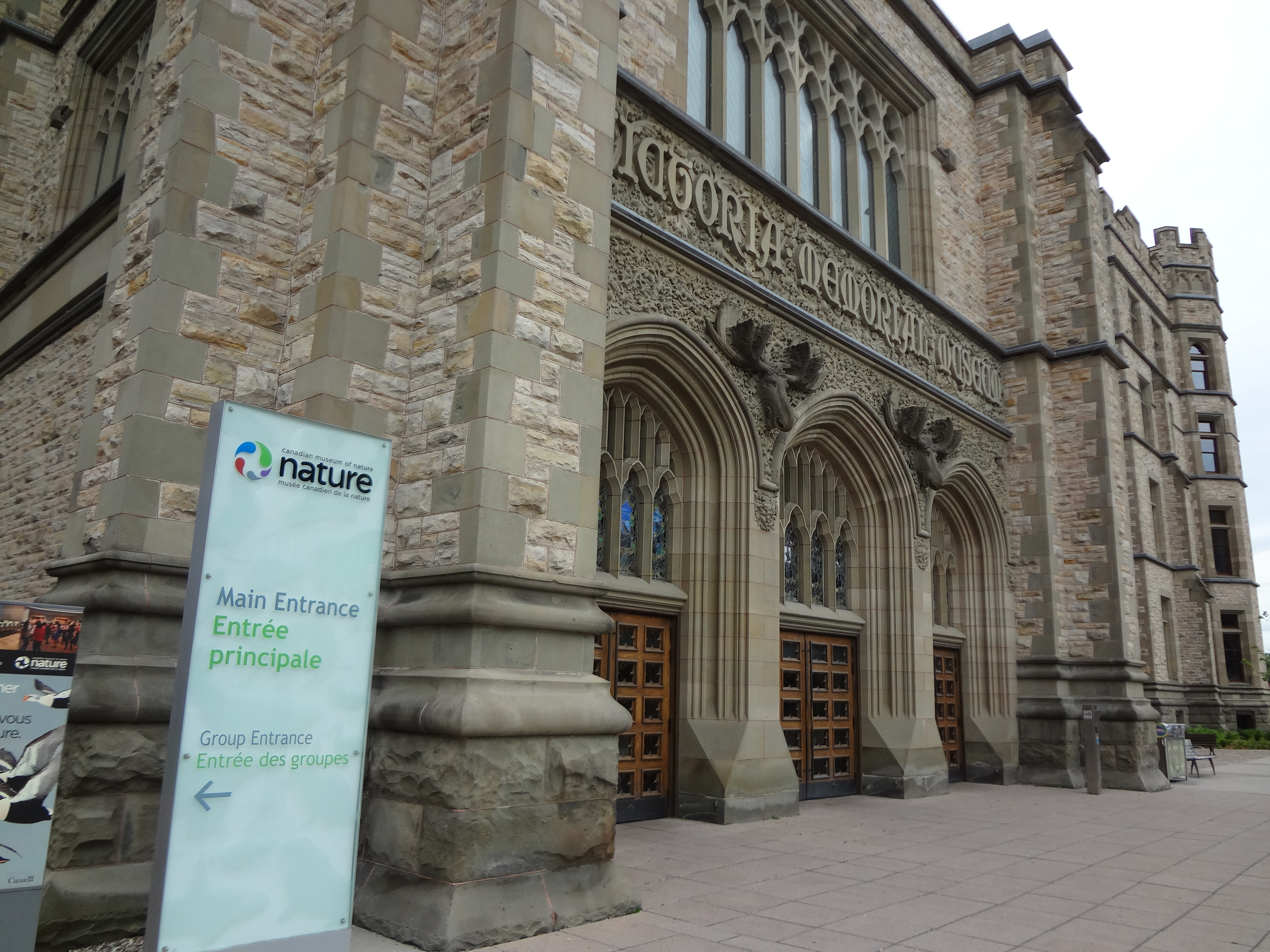
Main entrance to the building with moose carvings adorning the doorways

The 18,910-square-metre (203,492 sq ft) Tudor-Gothic Revival-style building was designed by David Ewart, the Chief Architect of the Department of Public Works. Tudor-Gothic detailing may be found throughout the building; including its original entrance that consists of a triple arch with neo-gothic tracery, pointed arch windows, decorative buttresses, and crenellations and corner turret. Many of the carvings found on the building depict Canadian flora and fauna. In addition to its Tudor-Gothic detailing, the design and orientation of the building also draw upon Beaux-Arts architectural principles.

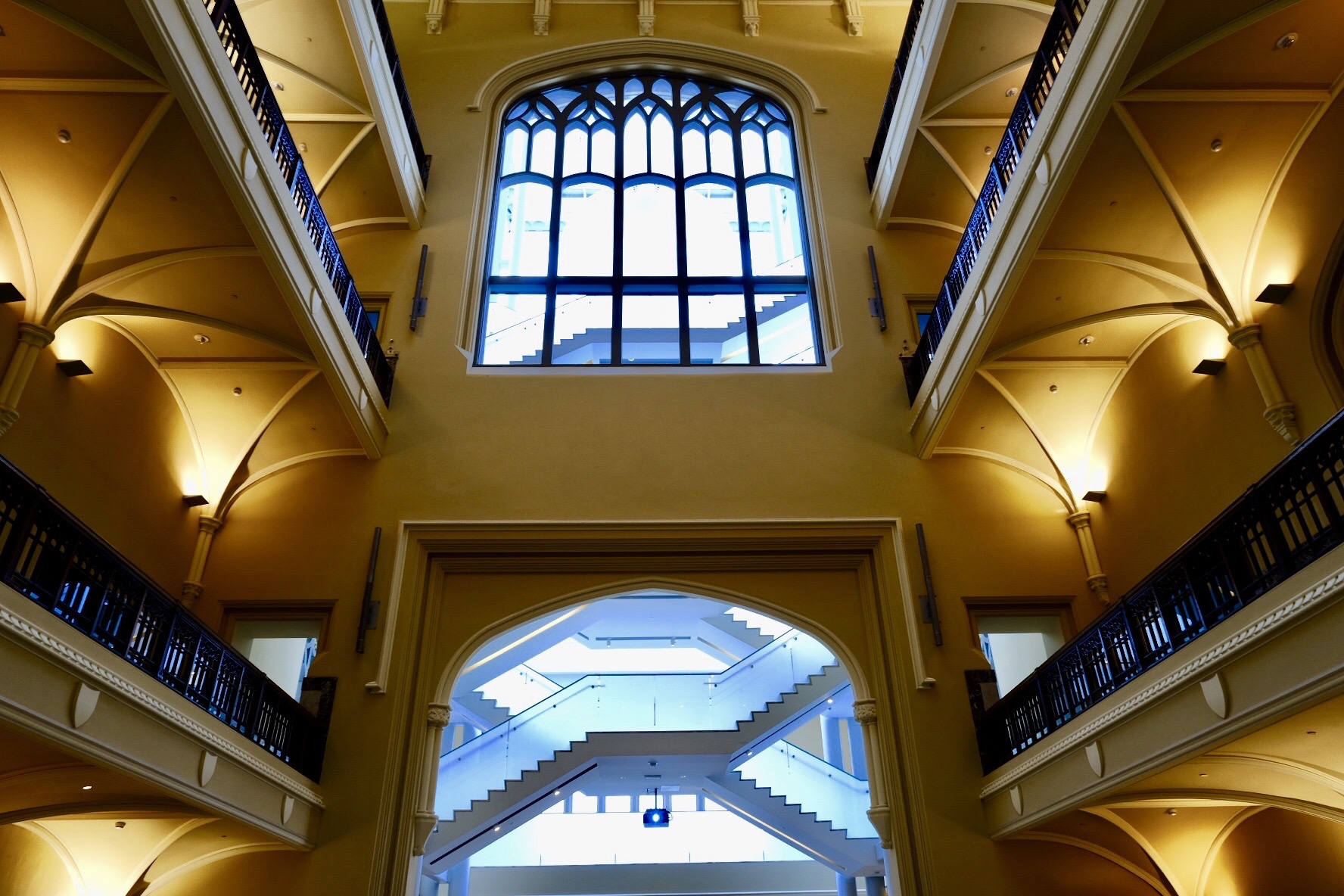
The central mezzanine in the centre of the museum building, providing access to all sections of the museum.

The interior is also embellished with carved wood and bronze balustrades, mosaic floors, marble and plaster detailing and decorative works, and stained glass windows. The interior spaces are centred around a formal hall from which all the museum's other spaces are accessible.

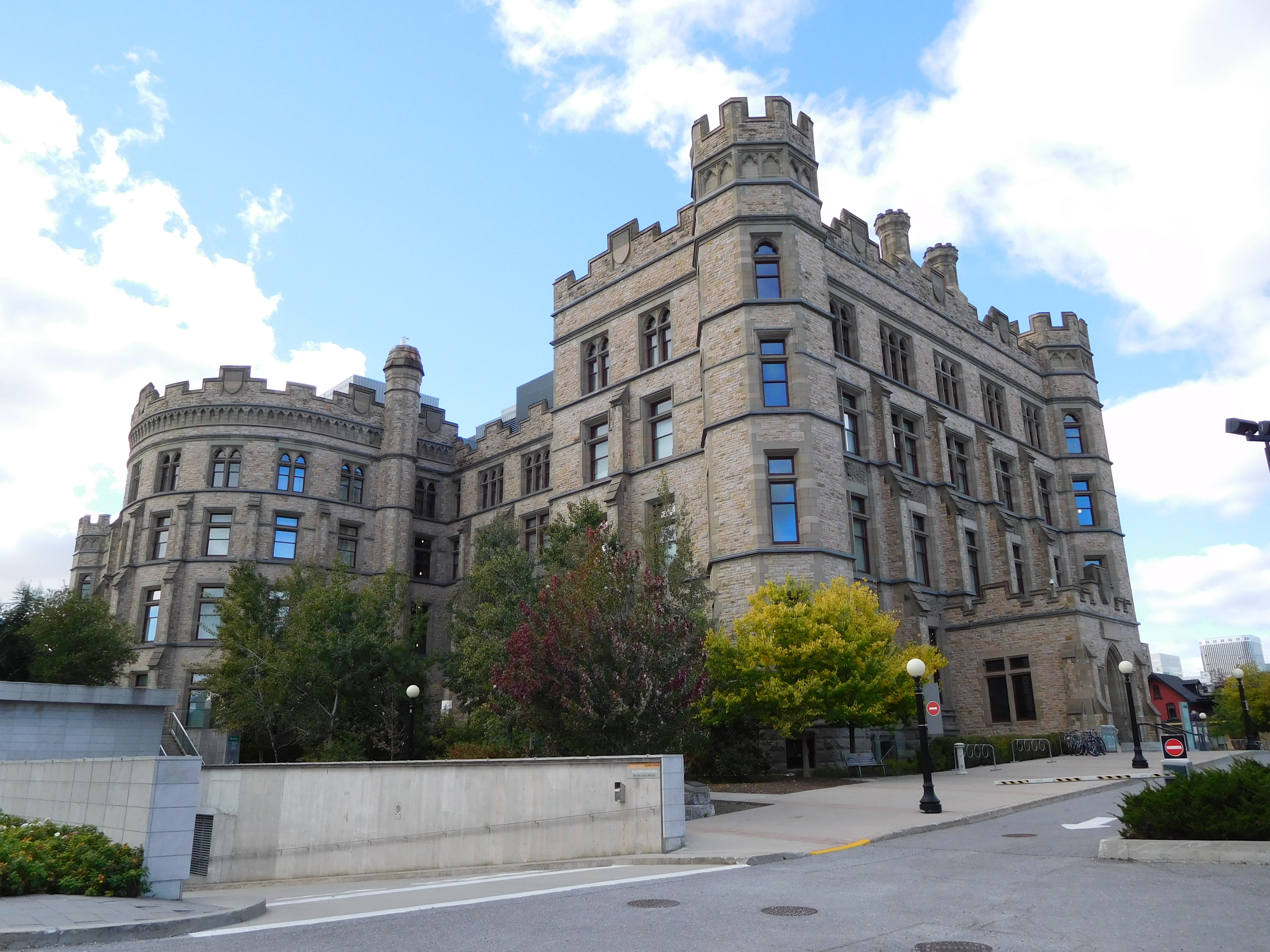
Southeast corner of the building. The entrance to the museum's shipping and receiving bay is visible in the left foreground.

The building initially included a central tower at its entrance. However, the original tower caused the building to "sink" as the original design did not account for the Leda clay the structure was built on, resulting in the original tower's removal several years after the building opened. A glass and steel tower erected in the place of the former central tower was built between 2004 and 2010. The new central tower, named the Queens' Lantern was formally opened in May 2010. The 20 metres (66 ft) glass tower houses a butterfly staircase that was installed to improve visitor circulation in the museum.

The construction of the Queens' Lantern formed a part of a larger rehabilitation project undertaken by the museum between 2004 and 2010, including a 2,300 square metres (25,000 sq ft) partially below-grade expansion to the south of the building, which included laboratories, the shipping and receiving area, workshops, and a green roof; the latter feature used as an outdoor public gathering place. The area surrounding the building's south-side expansion includes green spaces, a greenhouse, and a live animal display area. Other renovations included extensive redesigns to the exhibitions, seismic and building code upgrades, mechanical and electrical system upgrades, asbestos removal, and repairing and restoring the masonry on the building. Designs for the 2004-2010 renovations, including the Queens' Lantern, was a joint effort between Barry Padolsky Associates Inc., KPMB Architects, and Gagnon Joint Venture Architects; with PCL Construction contracted to renovate and build the expansion.

Materials used to erect the building include Tyndall stone, steel frames, reinforced concrete, stone exterior cladding, and sandstone. Most of the sandstone used in the building was quarried from Nepean, Ontario, Wallace, Nova Scotia, and several communities in Quebec. Granite used in the building was quarried from Stanstead, Quebec.

=== Natural Heritage Campus ===
The Natural Heritage Campus houses the museum's administrative offices, scientific facilities, and collection storage. Situated in Gatineau, Quebec, the 76 hectares (190 acres) campus was opened by the museum in 1997. The building itself is 20,478 square metres (220,420 sq ft), and offers workspaces, in addition to laboratory spaces.

The building includes three environmentally controlled "pods," housing 42 individual collection rooms and nine documentation rooms. More than 3,000 cabinets are used in the facility's storage spaces to house the museum's specimens. To help preserve the specimens, none of the storage facilities share a wall with the exterior of the building; with a specially sealed corridor surrounding its storage spaces.

== Exhibitions ==
The museum has seven permanent exhibitions at its Victoria Memorial Museum Building. In addition to its permanent exhibitions, the museum also hosts and organizes several travelling exhibitions.

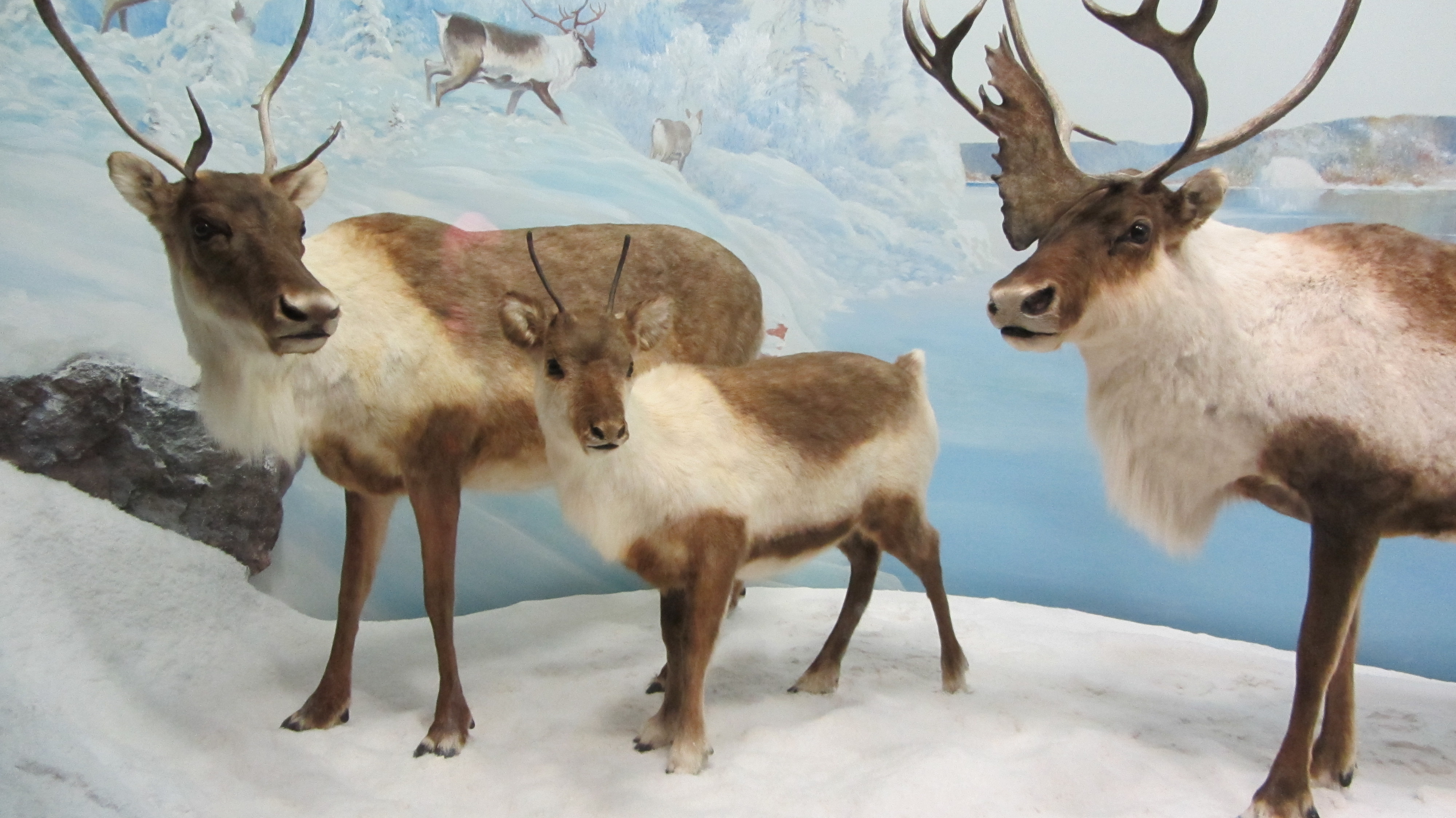
Caribou diorama in the museum's Mammal Gallery

The permanent exhibitions at the museum include the Bird Gallery; with over 500 specimens mounted throughout the gallery, representing over 450 species. Several diorama backgrounds featured in the Bird Gallery were painted by James Perry Wilson. The Mammal Gallery is a gallery centred on mammals found in Canada, and also includes several dioramas painted by Clarence Tillenius during the mid-20th century. The Earth Gallery is a permanent exhibition focused on minerals, rocks, and other geological forces. A goodwill Lunar sample gifted to Canada by the United States is on display in the Earth Gallery. The Fossil Gallery is another permanent exhibition that contains fossils from dinosaurs, mammals, and marine animals from approximately 35 to 85 million years ago; including over 30 nearly complete sets of dinosaur skeletons dating between 65 and 85 million years old. A fairly complete specimen of an Edmontosaurus in the museum's Fossil Gallery was the first specimen to be mounted in a Canadian museum; having been acquired by the museum in 1912 and on display since 1913. The other permanent exhibitions include Nature Live, a gallery that houses live arachnids, insects and other invertebrates; and the Water Gallery, which focuses on marine animals and hydrology.

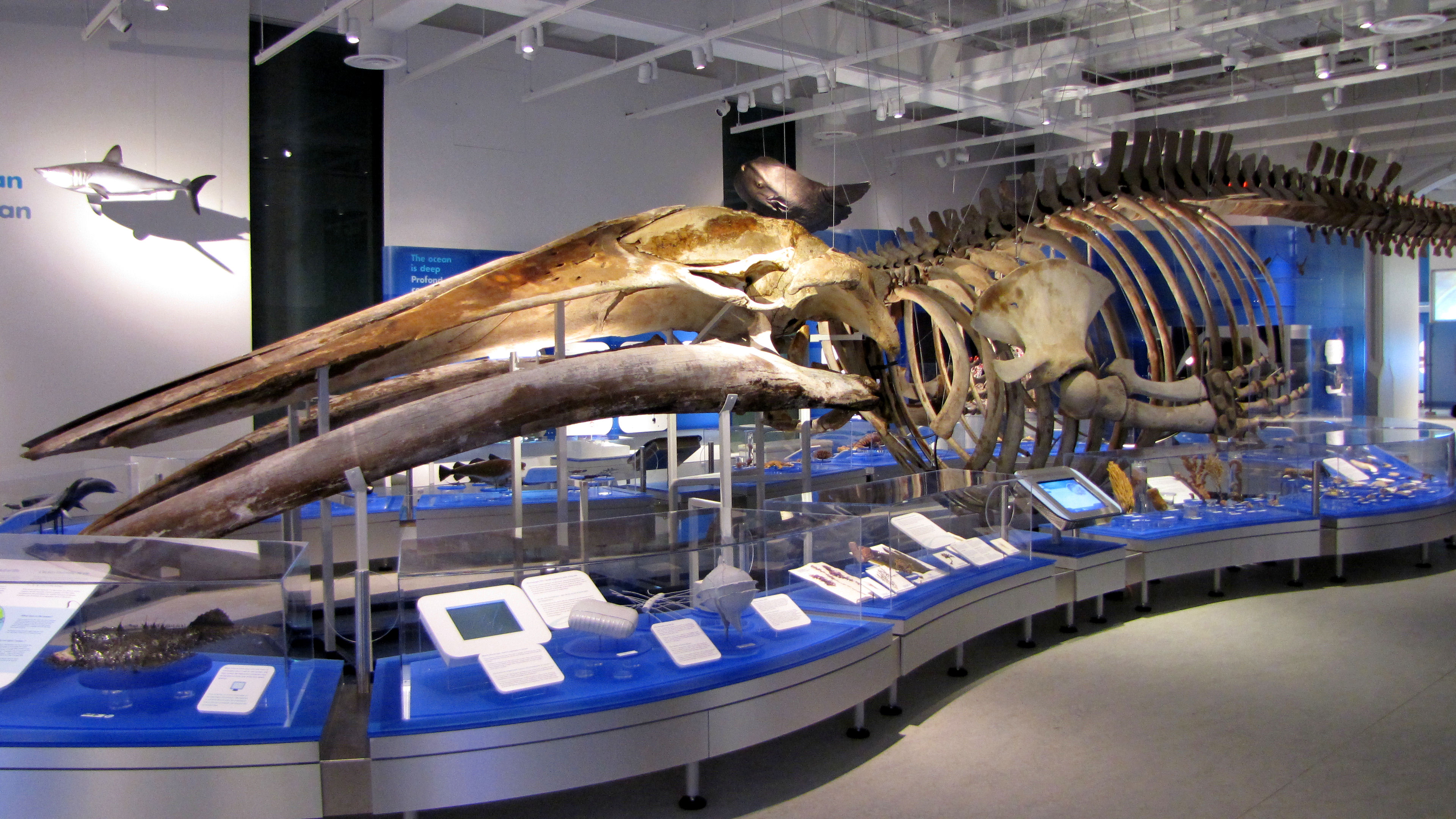
Skeleton of a blue whale in the museum's Water Gallery exhibition

The newest permanent exhibition to be introduced at the museum is the Canada Goose Arctic Experience, with over 200 specimens and artifacts from the Canadian Arctic on display in the exhibition. The Arctic Experience gallery was opened in June 2017, coinciding with the 150th anniversary celebrations for Canada. The Arctic Experience gallery encompasses 8,000 square feet (740 m^{2}), and is divided into four themed areas that cover climate, ecosystems, geography, and sustainability; in addition to a Beyond Ice installation. The Beyond Ice installation provides visitors a sensory experience of the Arctic region, and was designed alongside the National Film Board of Canada. Although many of the items on display in the Arctic Experience gallery form a part of the museum's collection, the seal-skin kayak, and the items originating from John Franklin's lost expedition were loaned to the museum by the Government of Nunavut. Canada Goose Inc. is the gallery's title sponsor.

=== Temporary exhibitions ===
- Body Worlds: Animal Inside Out - Part of the series of Body Worlds exhibitions that shows sculptures of various plastinated animals that includes a gorilla, a giraffe, an elephant, a cheetah, a tiger, a camel, a caribou, a horse, a cow, a bull, a yak, a sheep, a goat, an ostrich, a great white shark holding a seal in his mouth, and a lion pouncing on an oryx from behind, among others.

== Collections ==
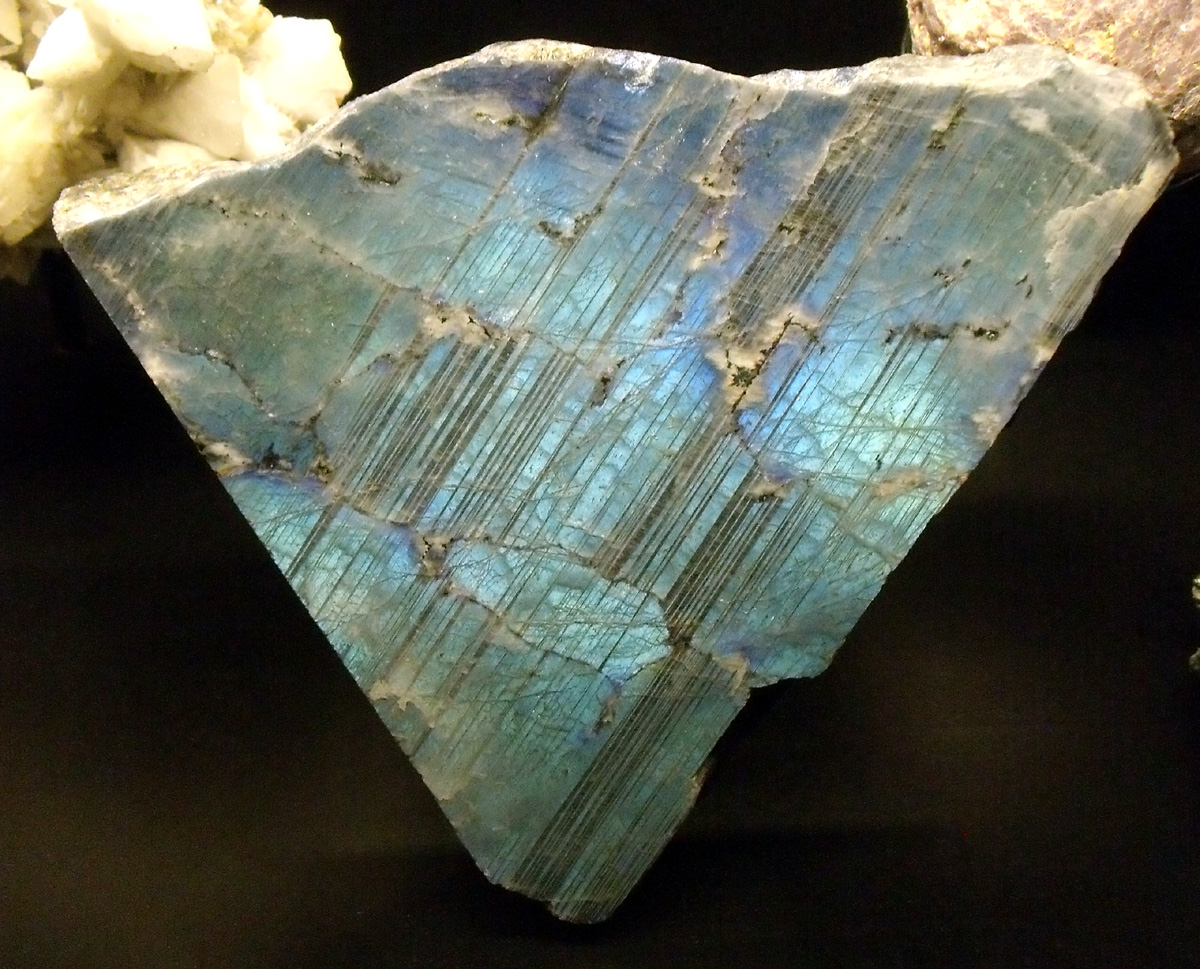
A piece of labradorite from the museum's collection

Collecting efforts by the Canadian Museum of Nature forms a part of the museum's core mandate, with the collection intended to be used to facilitate "interest in, knowledge of and appreciation and respect for the natural world." The museum's collection includes algae, amphibians, birds, bryophytes, fishes, gemstones, invertebrate animals, lichens, mammals, minerals, mosses, palaeobotany material, reptiles, rocks, vascular plants, and vertebrate fossils. In addition these specimens, the museum's collection also includes a collection of art and film pertaining to natural history, audio recording of animal behaviours, and animal models; the latter two typically employed in the museum's exhibitions. As of February 2017 the museum's collection includes over 14.6 million specimens, forming the largest collection of biological specimens in Canada. Although a number of these items are on display in its exhibitions, many of these specimens are held at an off-site storage facility, the Natural Heritage Campus in Gatineau, Quebec. The off-site facility holds over 3.1 million accessioned lots representing more than 10.6 million specimens. As of 2014, approximately 22 per cent of the accessioned lots have been digitized and may be viewed through an online database. Since 2001, there were approximately 43,000 specimens added to the museum's collections annually; acquired primarily through fieldwork by staff, research associates and other collaborators.

The first items from the museum's collection originated from the collecting efforts of John Macoun, who was hired as the museum's first biologist by the Geological Survey of Canada in 1882. Other early researchers who helped build up the institution's collections includes Erling Porsild, Charles Mortram Sternberg, and Percy A. Taverner. In addition to museum staff, the museum's collection also includes specimens collected from other naturalists including Catharine Parr Traill. The museum's collection includes over 25 scrapbooks from Traill from 1866 to 1899, forming the most extensive collection of plant pressings by Traill. The Traill collection forms a part of the National Herbarium of Canada, the museum's botany collection.

The museum's herpetology collection includes over 133,000 specimens and forms the world's largest collection of herpetological specimens that originate from Canada. The museum also holds the largest collection of Arctic plant specimens from Canada; with over 100,000 Arctic plant specimens forming part of the National Herbarium of Canada collection.

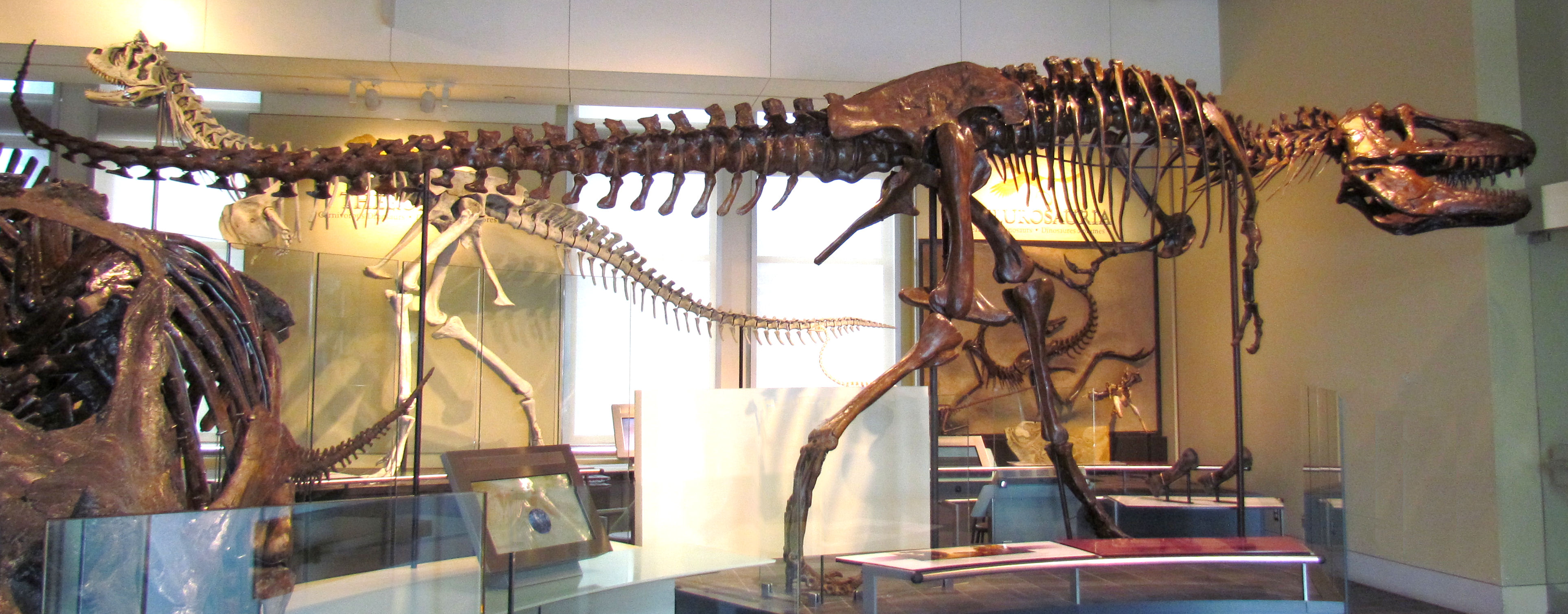
A Daspletosaurus torosus holotype specimen from the museum's collection mounted on display

The museum's collection also includes the skull of an Albertosaurus, the first dinosaur skull found in Canada, discovered by Joseph Tyrrell. Other specimens from its fossil collection include the holotypes for the Daspletosaurus torosus and the Vagaceratops. The former skeletal set was initially mistaken for a Gorgosaurus although research conducted by the museum during the 1960s determined that the fossils were a new species of dinosaur. The holotype for the Vagaceratops was similarly mistaken for a different species when its fossils were first delivered to the museum in 1958; with museum researchers later discovering the fossil was a new species after removing it from the plaster field during the 1990s. In 2015, the museum received over 60 specimens of the Tiktaalik roseae. The species was discovered by American palaeontologists Edward Daeschler, Farish Jenkins, and Neil Shubin on Ellesmere Island, who studied the fossils in the United States before they were sent to the Canadian Museum of Nature.

== Research ==
Supporting and conducting research into natural history forms a part of the museum's core mandate according to the Museum Act. The museum's Research Services are split into two disciplines, life sciences and earth sciences. The museum operates two cross-disciplinary centres, the Beaty Centre for Species Discovery and the Centre for Arctic Knowledge and Exploration. Museum researchers have been conducting research on Arctic flora since the 1980s, with a particular emphasis on alkali grass. Other major research programs the museum took part in include several excavations of the Foremost Formation for dinosaur remains, and the China-Canada Dinosaur Project between 1986 and 1991.

Between 1972 and 1995, the institution published its own scientific journal, Syllogeus.

== Library and archives ==
The museum also operates a library and archive at the Natural Heritage Centre. The library contains over 35,000 books, 2,000 periodic titles, museum publications, and microfilms relating to natural history. The museum's archives contain three collections: archival records relating to the museum; a photograph collection of more than 275,000 slides, photos, negatives, and plates; and an art collection of 1,800 works primarily focused on nature.

== See also ==
- List of people associated with the Canadian Museum of Nature
- List of museums in Ottawa
- List of natural history museums
- Royal eponyms in Canada
