= Lunar sample displays =

Commemorative plaques containing small fragments of the Moon

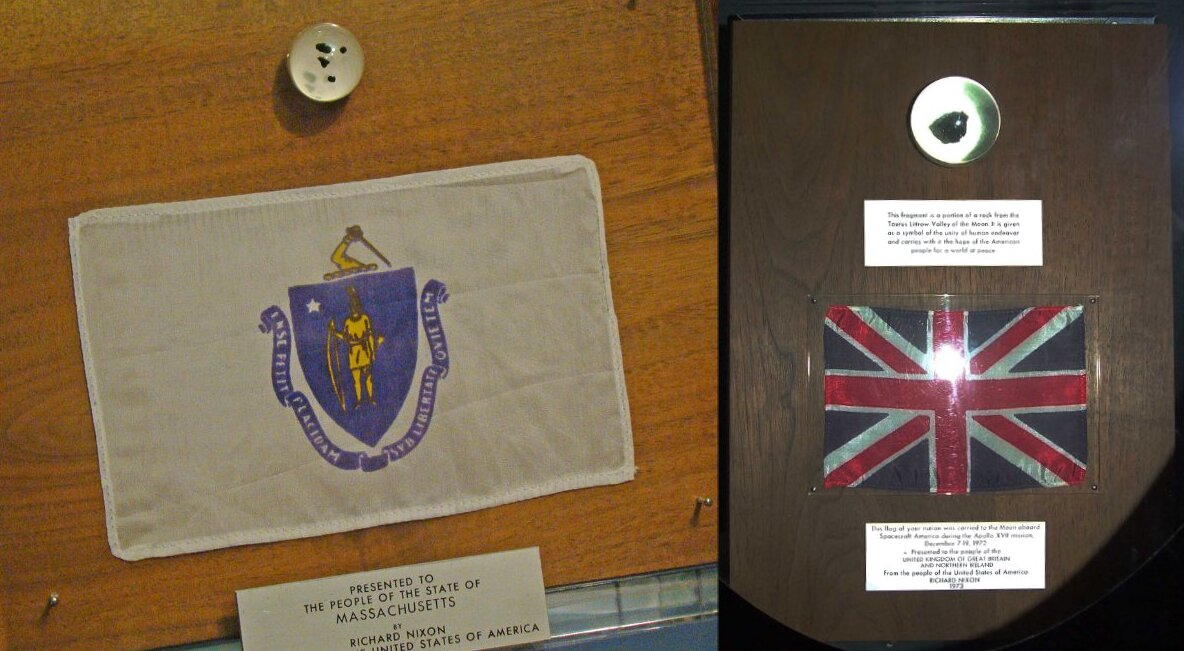
Examples of 'Moon rocks' display. To the left, part of Massachusetts lunar sample display of Apollo 11. To the right, United Kingdom lunar sample display of Apollo 17

The lunar sample displays are two commemorative plaques consisting of small fragments of Moon specimen brought back by the astronauts of the Apollo 11 and Apollo 17 lunar missions. The plaques and Moon rocks were given as goodwill gifts in 1970 and 1973 to the people of 135 countries, the 50 states of the United States and some of its overseas territories, by United States President Richard Nixon.

== Description ==
=== Apollo 11 ===
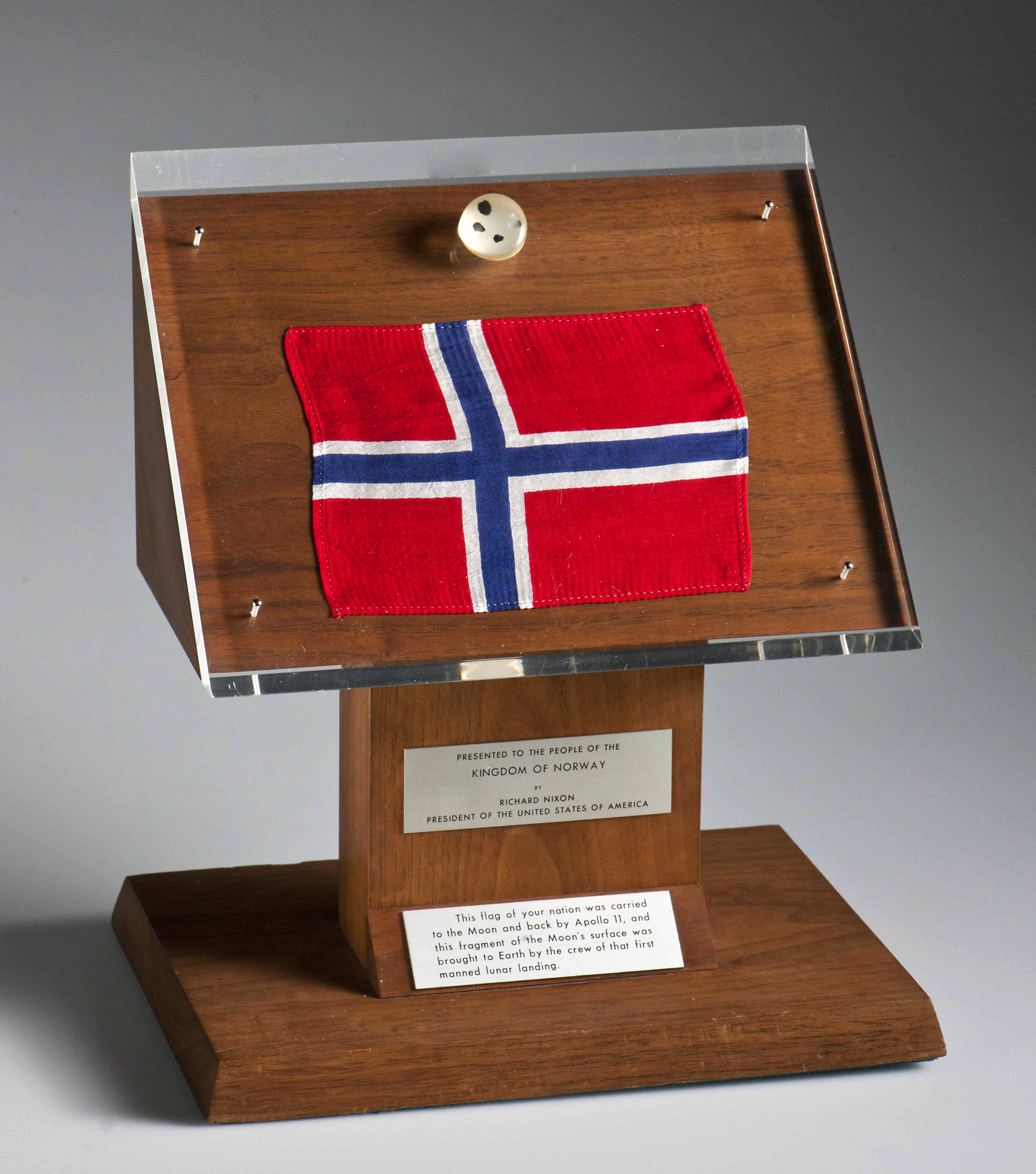
Norway Apollo 11 'Moon rocks' display

The Apollo 11 lunar sample display is a commemorative podium style plaque display consisting of four rice-size dust particle specimens (dubbed "Moon rocks"), the recipient's flag and two small metal plates attached with descriptive messages.

In 1970, US president Richard Nixon gave presentation samples of Moon rock gathered by NASA astronauts Buzz Aldrin and Neil Armstrong, which had been flown from the Moon in the Apollo 11 lunar module Eagle and brought to Earth in the Apollo 11 command module Columbia, as gifts to 135 countries and 50 US states.

=== Apollo 17 ===
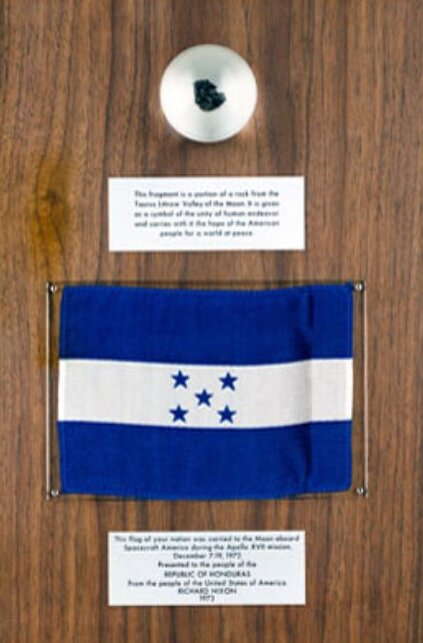
Honduras plaque of Apollo 17

The Apollo 17 lunar sample display consists of a Moon rock fragment from a lava Moon stone identified as lunar basalt 70017, the recipient's flag and two small metal plates attached with descriptive messages, all inside a wooden commemorative plaque.

Near the end of their third and final moonwalk, and what would be the last moonwalk of the Apollo program, Apollo 17 astronauts Eugene Cernan and Harrison Schmitt "picked up a very significant rock, typical of what we have here in the valley of Taurus-Littrow... composed of many fragments, of many sizes, and many shapes, probably from all parts of the Moon, perhaps billions of years old" and made a special dedication to the young people of Earth. This rock was later labeled sample 70017. Nixon ordered the distribution of fragments of the rock to 135 foreign heads of state and the 50 U.S. states, as a goodwill gesture. These gifts were distributed in 1973, and dubbed the Goodwill rocks.

== Recipients ==
Inside the United States, displays were given to all 50 states and four territories: American Samoa, Guam, Northern Mariana Islands and Puerto Rico.

Outside the United States, the following countries received displays:

Afghanistan, Albania, Algeria, Andorra, Argentina, Australia, Austria, Barbados, Belgium, Bhutan, Bolivia, Botswana, Brazil, Bulgaria, Burma, Burundi, Cameroon, Canada, Cambodia, Central African Republic, Ceylon (current Sri Lanka), Chad, Chile, China, Colombia, Congo (Brazzaville), Congo (Kinshasa), Costa Rica, Cuba, Cyprus, Czechoslovakia, Dahomey, Denmark, Dominican Republic, Ecuador, Egypt, El Salvador, Equatorial Guinea, Eswatini, Ethiopia, Finland, France, Gabon, Gambia, Ghana, Greece, Guatemala, Guinea, Guyana, Haiti, Honduras, Hungary, Iceland, India, Indonesia, Ivory Coast, Iran, Iraq, Ireland, Israel, Italy, Jamaica, Japan, Jordan, Kenya, Kuwait, Laos, Lebanon, Lesotho, Liberia, Libya, Liechtenstein, Luxembourg, Madagascar, Malawi, Malaysia, Maldives, Mali, Malta, Mauritania, Mauritius, Mexico, Monaco, Mongolia, Morocco, Muscat and Oman, Nauru, Nepal, Netherlands, New Zealand, Nicaragua, Niger, Nigeria, Norway, Pakistan, Panama, Paraguay, Peru, Philippines, Poland, Portugal, Romania, Rwanda, San Marino, Saudi Arabia, Senegal, Sierra Leone, Singapore, Somalia, South Africa, South Korea, Southern Yemen, Soviet Union, Spain, Sudan, Sweden, Switzerland, Syria, Taiwan, Tanzania, Thailand, Togo, Trinidad and Tobago, Tunisia, Turkey, Uganda, United Kingdom, Upper Volta (current Burkina Faso), Uruguay, Vatican City, Venezuela, South Vietnam, West Germany, Western Samoa, Yemen, Yugoslavia and Zambia.

Also, displays were given to the United Nations.

Bahamas, Bahrain, Bangladesh, Fiji, Solomon Islands (in that time a British overseas possession), Mozambique (in that time an overseas province of Portugal), Qatar, Tonga and United Arab Emirates didn't receive display of Apollo 11, but they received display of Apollo 17.

== Stolen and missing ==
Of the 270 Moon rocks given to countries by the Nixon administration, approximately 159 are missing. Many that are not have been locked away in storage for decades. Their locations have been sought or tracked by researchers and hobbyists because of their rarity and the difficulty of obtaining more. They have also been stolen and forged.

== See also ==
- List of Apollo lunar sample displays
