= White Memorial Foundation =

Conservation body in Connecticut, US

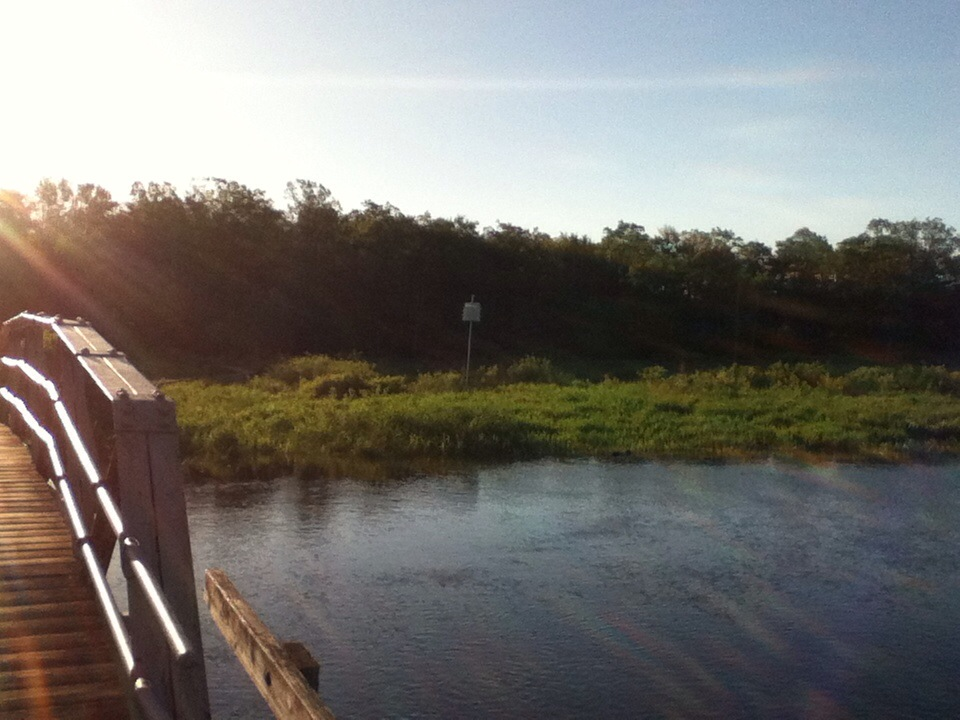
- Sutton's Bridge on the boardwalk of the White Memorial Foundation, Litchfield, Connecticut

- Location within Connecticut
- Location: Litchfield, Morris, Litchfield, Connecticut, United States
- Coordinates: 41°43′10.88″N 73°13′1.38″W
- Area: 4,034 acres (16.33 km^{2})
- Elevation: 923 ft (281 m)Museum Area
- Established: 1913
- Named for: Alain and May White
- Website: www.whitememorialcc.org

The White Memorial Foundation is an organization dedicated to environmental conservation located in Litchfield, Connecticut. The Foundation owns approximately 4,000 acres of wetlands and uplands, including recreational trails, two camping areas, and a conservation center dedicated to education, research, conservation, and recreation.

== History ==
The White Memorial Foundation was founded by Alain and May White in 1913, who wished to preserve the areas around Bantam Lake from land development.

== Facilities ==
The White Memorial Foundation supports a museum, the White Memorial Conservation Center, which explains the natural history and habitats found on the property. The Conservation Center often holds educational programs for both adults and children.

Two camping areas are located on White Memorial property, one at Point Folly on Bantam Lake, and a second on Windmill Hill near the Conservation Center.

There are approximately 35 miles of trail on the property, which can be used for walking, running, biking, horseback riding, and cross-country-skiing. There is also a mile-long boardwalk through the marsh around Little Pond.

With large areas of the property abutting Bantam Lake and the Bantam River, kayaking, canoeing, and fishing are popular activities.

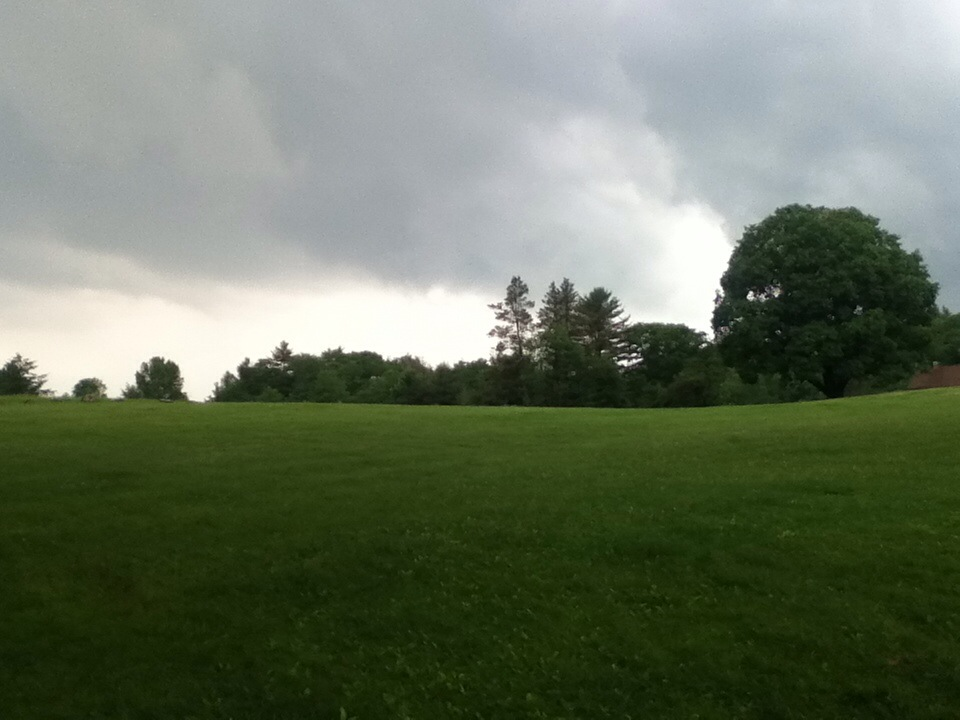
The activity fields at the White Memorial Foundation, Litchfield, Connecticut

== Research and Conservation ==
The White Memorial Foundation owns large areas of wetland and lakefront to prevent overdevelopment and subsequent loss of biodiversity. These large tracts of wetland juxtaposed with nearby uplands create a unique mosaic of habitats that are home to a variety of different plants and animals. 238 species of birds, 50 species of mammals, 35 species of reptiles and amphibians, and 29 species of fish have been recorded on the property.

== Land Gifts ==
Since 1913, the White Memorial Foundation has donated land and money to the State of Connecticut for conservation purposes, including two of the first 15 Connecticut State Parks. Specific land gifts include:

- Mohawk State Forest (2,000 acres)
- Kent Falls State Park (200 acres)
- Macedonia Brook State Park (2,000 acres)
- Robbins Swamp Wildlife Management Area (492 acres)
- Campbell Falls State Park Reserve (5 acres)
- Peoples State Forest (400 acres)
- Humaston Brook State Park (9 acres)

== See also ==
- White Memorial Conservation Center
