= Housatonic State Forest =

Connecticut state forest

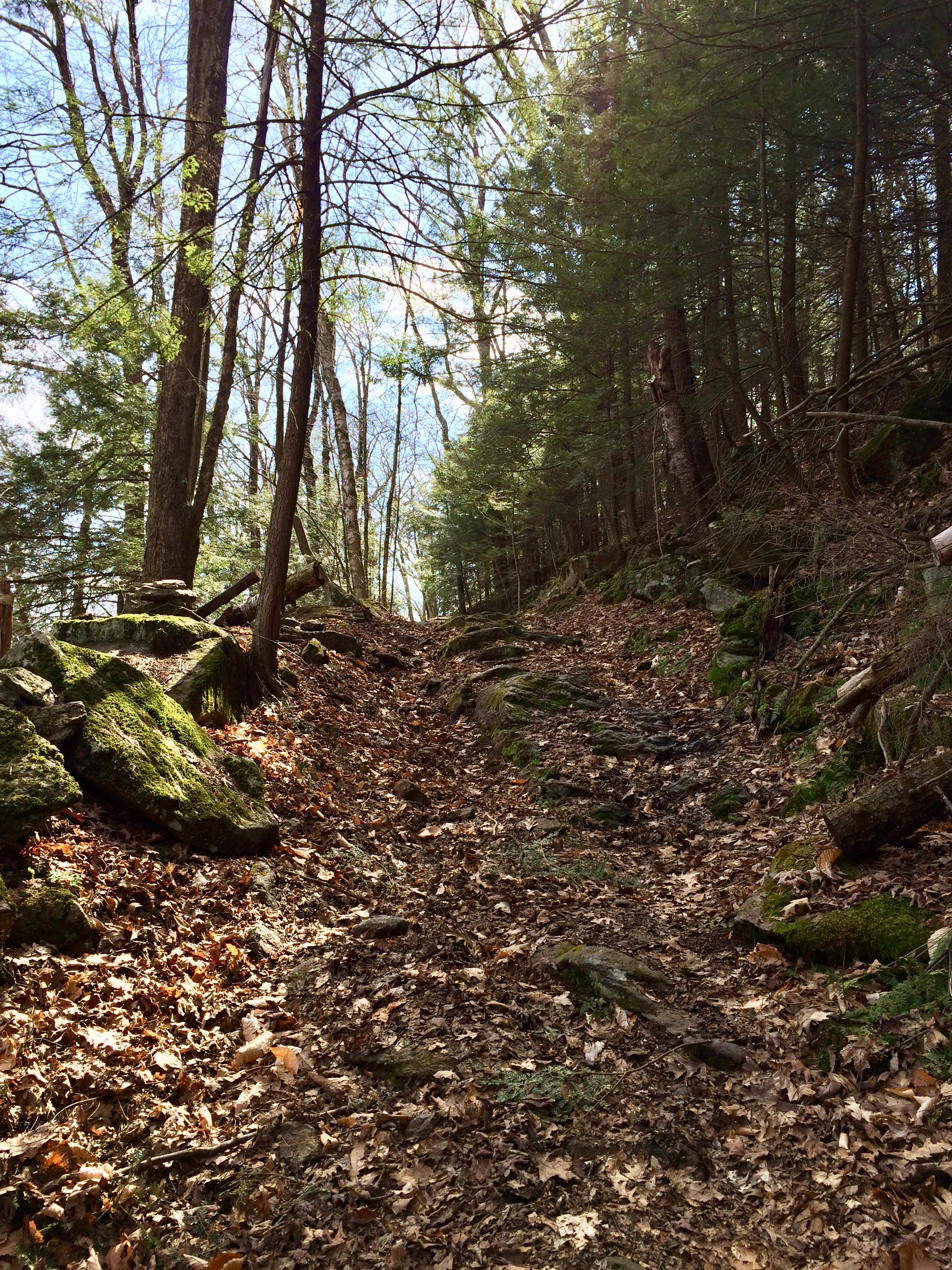
- Historic Iron Trail wagon cart route through Housatonic State Forest in North Canaan and Canaan, Connecticut (between Beckley Furnace and the Canaan Mountain area).

- Location within Connecticut Location within the United States
- Location: Sharon, Canaan, Cornwall, and North Canaan, Connecticut, United States
- Coordinates: 41°54′58″N 73°18′33″W
- Area: 11,284 acres (4,566 ha)
- Elevation: 1,145 ft (349 m)
- Established: 1927
- Administrator: Connecticut Department of Energy and Environmental Protection
- Website: Official website

Housatonic State Forest is a Connecticut state forest occupying 11,284 acres (4,566 ha) in the towns of Sharon, Canaan, Cornwall, North Canaan, Salisbury and Norfolk. The state forest includes two Connecticut natural area preserves, Gold's Pines and Canaan Mountain, and is the only Connecticut state forest that includes a portion of the Appalachian Trail. The forest is open for hiking, hunting, mountain biking, and snowmobiling.
