= Connecticut Route 263 =

State highway in Litchfield County, Connecticut, US

Route 263
- Map of Litchfield County in northwestern Connecticut with Route 263 highlighted in red

Route information
- Maintained by CTDOT
- Length: 6.23 mi (10.03 km)
- Existed: 1963–present

Major junctions
- West end: Route 272 in Goshen
- East end: US 44 / Route 183 in Winchester

Location
- Country: United States
- State: Connecticut
- Counties: Litchfield

Highway system
- Connecticut State Highway System; Interstate; US; State; SSR; SR; Scenic
← Route 262	→ Route 272

Route 263 is a state highway in northwestern Connecticut running from Goshen to the city of Winsted in the town of Winchester.

== Route description ==
Route 263 begins as Winchester Road at an intersection with Route 272 in northeastern Goshen and heads northeast around Mount Ouleout, crossing into the town of Winchester after 0.4 miles (0.64 km). In Winchester, it heads east as Thomen Road and Ashley Road toward Winchester Center, turning right onto West Road in the town center. After passing the Winchester post office, Route 263 then turns northeast along Winchester Road. It travels in between Crystal Lake and Highland Lake as it proceeds on its way to Winsted. In Winsted, Route 263 uses Boyd Street and Lake Street to reach its eastern end at an intersection with US 44 and Route 183 near the Mad River in Winsted.

== History ==
Since 1959, the road connecting Winsted and Winchester Center had been an unsigned state-maintained road known as State Road 863. As part of the 1962 Route Reclassification Act, Route 263 was established in 1963 from SR 863 and a westward extension to Route 272 in Goshen. There have been no significant changes to the road alignment or designation since.

== Junction list ==
The entire route is in Litchfield County.

Location	mi	km	Destinations	Notes
Goshen	0.00	0.00	Route 272 – Norfolk, Torrington	Western terminus
Winchester	6.23	10.03	US 44 / Route 183 to Route 8 – Colebrook, Norfolk, Barkhamsted	Eastern terminus
1.000 mi = 1.609 km; 1.000 km = 0.621 mi
