= Colebrook Center Historic District =

Historic district in Connecticut, United States

- U.S. National Register of Historic Places
- U.S. Historic district
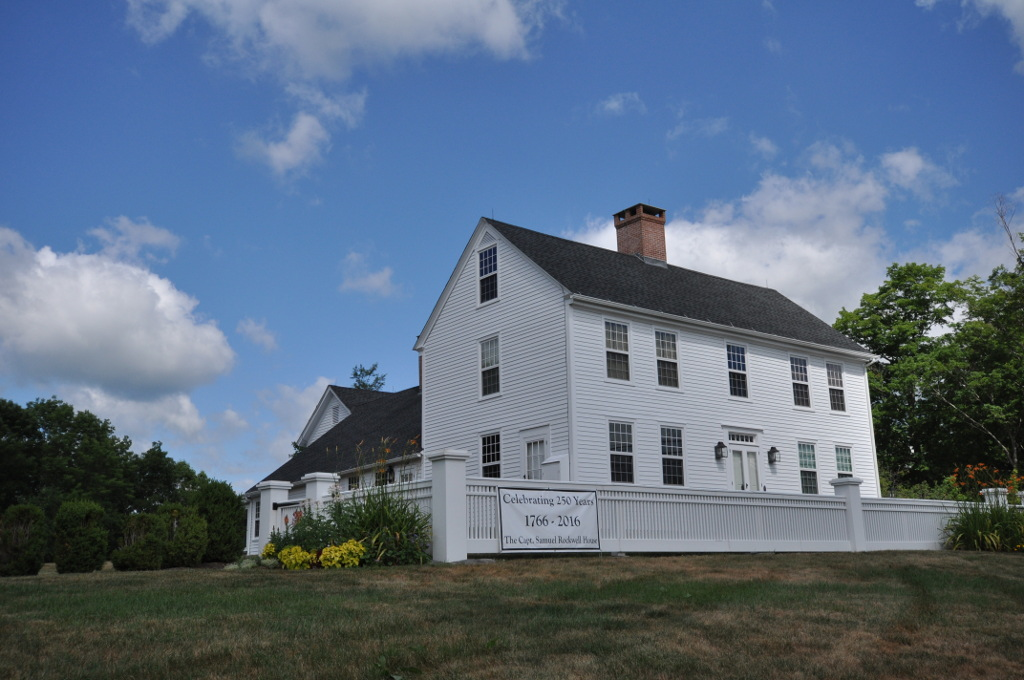
- Samuel Rockwell House

- Location within Connecticut Location within the United States
- Location: Roughly, Junction of Rockwell, Colebrook, Schoolhouse and Smith Hill Roads and CT 183, Colebrook, Connecticut
- Coordinates: 41°59′22″N 73°5′45″W
- Area: 110 acres (45 ha)
- Built by: William Swift
- Architect: William Swift
- Architectural style: Colonial, Greek Revival, Federal
- NRHP reference No.: 91000953
- Added to NRHP: July 26, 1991

The Colebrook Center Historic District encompasses the town center of Colebrook, Connecticut. Located in an isolated valley at the Junction of Connecticut Route 183 with Rockwell and Smith Hill Roads, the village was established in 1767, and has seen little change since about 1860. It was listed on the National Register of Historic Places in 1991.

== Description and history ==
The town of Colebrook is located in the hills of northwestern Connecticut, just south of the Massachusetts state line. It was surveyed in the mid-18th century and settled 1765 by natives of Windsor and East Windsor. It was incorporate in 1779. The oldest surviving house in Colebrook village, an ell to the Samuel Rockwell House, dates to this time. The location of the town center was a contentious matter, with a site probably near the present village church chosen c. 1790. With little land suitable for agriculture, the town's economy in the 19th century was dominated by the raising of sheep and cattle, and the operation of associated businesses such as tanneries, some of which were located just north of the main intersection on Center Brook. Since 1860, the village center has seen little change, and its economy is dominated by summer tourism.

The historic district is centered on the triangular common formed by Route 183, Smith Hill Road, and Thompson Road, with the Greek Revival church (built 1842) at the southern end. Extending north from the common are a cluster of residential and civic buildings, including the recently built town hall, one of the district's few late 20th-century intrusions. Opposite the town hall is the 1812 Colebrook Store, one of the district's finest examples of Federal period architecture. North of the store is the Samuel Rockwell House, and beyond that the district descends to Center Brook. Most of the principal buildings of the district were built before 1880, with mainly secondary buildings (garages, barns, and other outbuildings) built afterward.

== See also ==
- National Register of Historic Places listings in Litchfield County, Connecticut
