= Colebrook Store =

- U.S. National Register of Historic Places
- U.S. Historic district – Contributing property
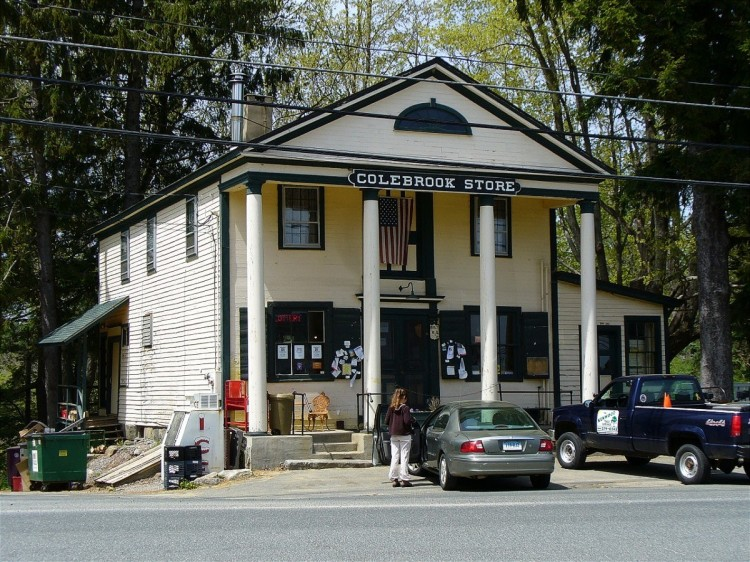

- Location within Connecticut Location within the United States
- Location: 559 Colebrook Road, Colebrook, Connecticut
- Coordinates: 41°59′22″N 73°5′48″W
- Area: 1 acre (0.40 ha)
- Built: 1812
- Built by: Swift, William
- Part of: Colebrook Center Historic District (ID91000953)
- NRHP reference No.: 76001980

Significant dates
- Added to NRHP: April 26, 1976
- Designated CP: July 26, 1991

The Colebrook Store is a historic commercial building at 559 Colebrook Road in the village center of Colebrook, Connecticut. Built in 1812, it has operated as a local general store since then, and is an architectural landmark for its two-story temple front. It was listed on the National Register of Historic Places in 1976.

== Description and history ==
The Colebrook Store stands prominently in the rural community's village center, at the northwest corner of Route 183 (Colebrook Road) and Rockwell Road. It is a 2 1/2-story wood-frame structure, with a gabled roof and clapboarded exterior. Its front is distinguished by a two-story Federal temple front, consisting of a fully pedimented gable supported by four slender Tuscan columns. At the center of the gable is a Federal style half-round fan. Behind the columns, the facade is symmetrical and covered with flushboarding, with windows flanking doorways on both levels; the second-floor doorway having previously served as a loading entry. The doorways and windows appear to be late 19th-century replacements, as are a number of the fixtures inside the store. Features from that period include hardwood flooring, tin ceilings, and counters.

The store was built in 1812 by William Swift, a local carpenter whose principal product was bedsteads. Swift was apparently well traveled, and was able to execute a distinct interpretation of the Adam style of Federal architecture in this building. He is also credited with construction of the Solomon Rockwell House in Winsted. The store has long been a fixture of the rural community, often used as a reference point in 19th-century descriptions of the area. It continues to serve the community and tourists as a general store.

== See also ==
- National Register of Historic Places listings in Litchfield County, Connecticut
