= Norfolk Historic District =

Historic district in Connecticut, United States

- U.S. National Register of Historic Places
- U.S. Historic district
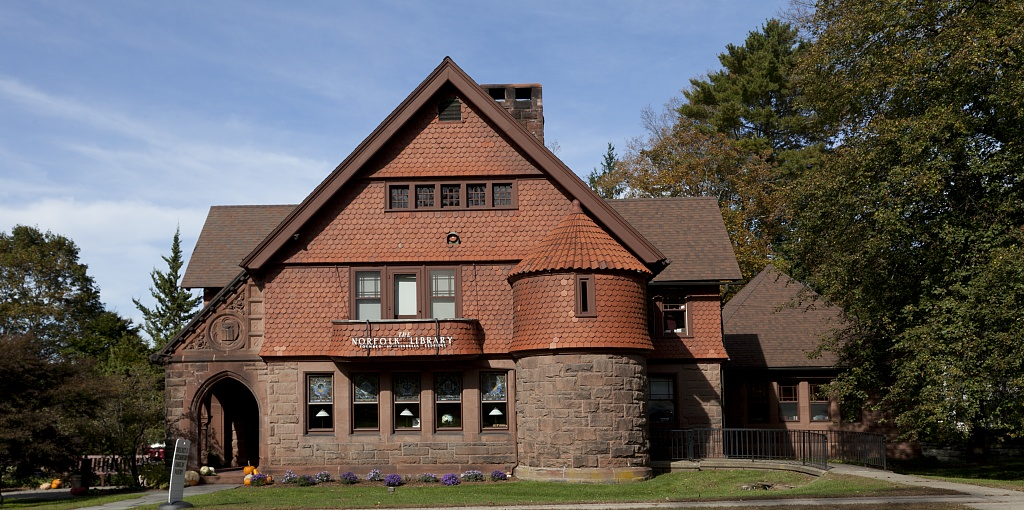

- Location within Connecticut Location within the United States
- Location: US 44 and CT 272, Norfolk, Connecticut
- Area: 90 acres (36 ha)
- Architect: Multiple
- Architectural style: Late Victorian
- NRHP reference No.: 79003749
- Added to NRHP: October 15, 1979

The Norfolk Historic District encompasses the historic civic and commercial center of Norfolk, Connecticut. Centered around a triangular green at the junction of United States Route 44 and Connecticut Route 272, it is a well-preserved late 19th to early 20th-century town center, with a number of architecturally distinctive buildings and structures. It was listed on the National Register of Historic Places in 1979. It remains on the register to this day.

== Description and history ==
The town of Norfolk was incorporated in 1758. Early growth was due in part to industry that developed on the Blackberry River near the town center, of which no significant traces remain. Its main period of growth began with the arrival in 1871 of the railroad, which led to the town's growth as a summer resort, marketed for its high elevation and fresh air. The town center benefited architecturally from the philanthropic activities of the interrelated Robbins-Battell-Stoeckel families, who contributed churches, civic buildings, and memorials to the town center. The major element of the town center, the former Stoeckel estate, is now home to the Yale Music School's summer programs.

The historic district covers about 90 acres (36 ha), most of which consists of the Stoeckel estate, located west of the town green. The triangular town green is the district's main focal point, with two churches (one early 19th century Federal style, the other later Romanesque) facing it from the west, the Norfolk Public Library (a handsome Shingle style building designed by George Keller in 1888) facing it from the north, and mainly older homes facing it from the east. At its southern tip is a memorial fountain designed by architect Stanford White. North of the green is a small business district, also included in the historic district. Several buildings in this area were designed by the noted New York architect Alfredo S.G. Taylor, who summered in Norfolk.

== See also ==
- National Register of Historic Places listings in Litchfield County, Connecticut
- Ellen Battell Stoeckel
