= Norfolk Library (Connecticut) =

Coordinates: 41.98931°N 73.19898°W

- The Norfolk Library
- U.S. Historic district – Contributing property
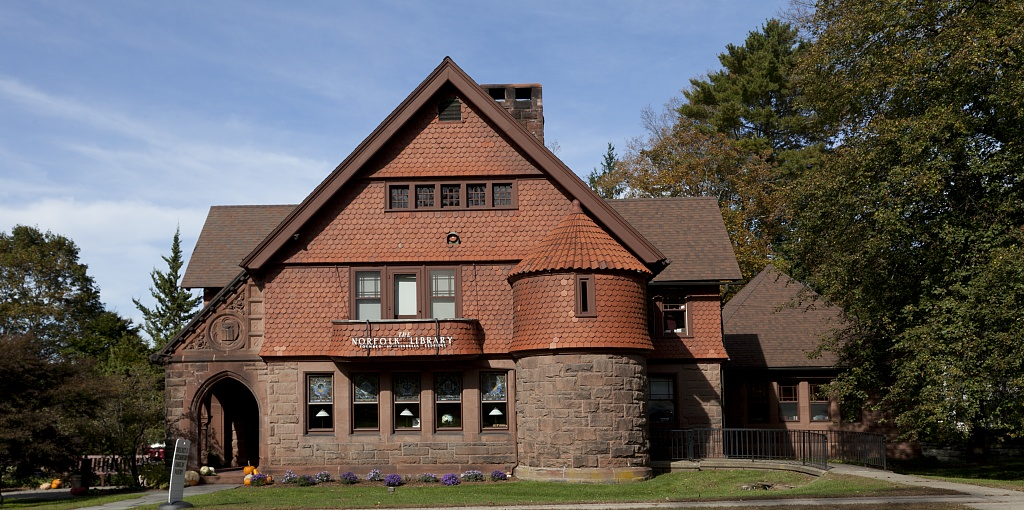
- Location: 9 Greenwoods Road East; Norfolk, Connecticut
- Built: 1888–89
- Architect: George Keller
- Architectural style: Shingle Style
- Part of: Norfolk Historic District (ID79003749)
- Designated CP: October 15, 1979

The Norfolk Library, also known as Eldridge Memorial Library, is a library at 9 Greenwoods Road East in Norfolk, Connecticut. The Norfolk Library is a private charitable organization, but the facility is open to the general public. Designed by architect George Keller in 1888, and greatly expanded by Keller in 1911, it is an outstanding example of Shingle Style architecture. The building is a contributing property in the Norfolk Historic District.

== History ==
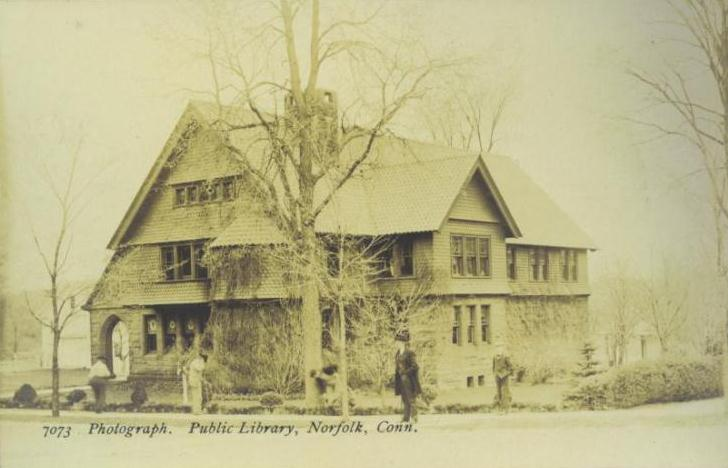
Library before 1911 addition.

Isabella Eldridge donated the building as a memorial to her parents. It was intended to be fireproof – hence, the use of tile shingles rather than wood ones – and serve as both a public library and a community meeting place.

Keller, of Hartford, Connecticut, is best remembered as an architect of war memorials. Although the datestone over the porch says "1888," the building opened on March 6, 1889.

The building's first story is faced with red Longmeadow, Massachusetts freestone. The second-story walls and third-story gables are faced with fish-scale tile shingles. The street (south) facade is asymmetrical and features a single, great gable that continues down to join the porch roof, a two-story half-turret, a small second-story balcony, and five first-story windows with stained-glass upper panes that light the circulation desk. The original Spanish tile roof, the same color as the wall tiles, had been replaced with asphalt shingles for a short time. In 2016, a fundraising project was initiated to restore the original Spanish Tile roof. The project was completed in 2016. The half-turret's conical roof retains its Spanish tile.

The library room is a long two-and-a-half-story space with a wood barrel-vaulted ceiling. It is flanked by two-story, red-oak book stacks to the east and west. A second-story gallery with red-oak balustrade wraps around three sides of it.

A description from 1900:

"The building was designed by Mr. George Keller, a noted architect of Hartford, Ct; is eighty-six by forty-five feet upon the ground, and two stories high ... The first floor contains a reception hall, a reading room, a conversation room, and the library room proper. This room, entered through the reception room, fills the height and breadth of the entire building, and is crowned with an imposing arch. As one enters the hall a fine bronze tablet upon the wall opposite meets the eye, with the inscription:

IN REVERENT MEMORY

OF JOSEPH AND SARAH ELDRIDGE"

== 1911 addition ==
With another donation from Isabella Eldridge, Keller more than doubled the size of the building, turning its plan into that of a small cathedral. What would have been the crossing became a continuation of the library room, and the transepts became two-story stacks on the east side and a reading room with fireplace on the west side. In place of an apse, Keller added the Great Hall, a large meeting room at the end of the building's axis. The Great Hall is also a two-and-a-half-story, barrel-vaulted space surrounded by a gallery, but it is at a grander scale than the original building. It is used for meetings, lectures, concerts and art exhibitions. Tall white-washed arches connect the addition's spaces.

== 1985 addition ==
A one-story, pyramidal-roofed addition to the building's east side houses the Smith Children's Room. Architect Alec Frost was able to obtain matching stone from the same quarry as the original library and 1911 addition.

== Operation ==
The library is a private non-profit institution, and is operated by a board of trustees. The Norfolk Library Associates, a non-profit volunteer organization formed in 1974, raises money for expanded library services such as lectures, book-signings and concerts.
