= U.S. Route 44 =

Highway in the United States

U.S. Route 44
- US 44 highlighted in red

Route information
- Maintained by NYSDOT, NYSBA, ConnDOT, RIDOT, and MassDOT
- Length: 236.7 mi (380.9 km)
- Existed: 1935–present

Major junctions
- West end: US 209 / NY 55 in Kerhonkson, NY
- US 9 in Poughkeepsie, NY; Taconic State Parkway in Pleasant Valley, NY; US 7 in Canaan, CT; I-84 / I-91 / US 6 in Hartford, CT; I-384 in Bolton, CT; I-395 in Putnam, CT; I-295 in Smithfield, RI; I-95 / US 6 / US 1 in Providence, RI; I-195 / US 6 / US 1A in East Providence, RI; I-495 in Middleborough, MA
- East end: Route 3A in Plymouth, MA

Location
- Country: United States
- States: New York, Connecticut, Rhode Island, Massachusetts
- Counties: NY: Ulster, Dutchess CT: Litchfield, Hartford, Tolland, Windham RI: Providence MA: Bristol, Plymouth

Highway system
- United States Numbered Highway System; List; Special; Divided
← US 43	→ US 45

U.S. Route 44 (US 44) is an east–west United States Numbered Highway that runs for 237 miles (381 km) through four states in the Northeastern United States. The western terminus is at US 209 and New York State Route 55 (NY 55) in Kerhonkson, New York, a hamlet in the Hudson Valley region. The eastern terminus is at Route 3A in Plymouth, Massachusetts.

== Route description ==
Lengths
	mi	km
NY	65.98	106.18
CT	106.03	170.64
RI	26.3	42.3
MA	38.40	61.80
Total	236.7	380.9

=== New York ===
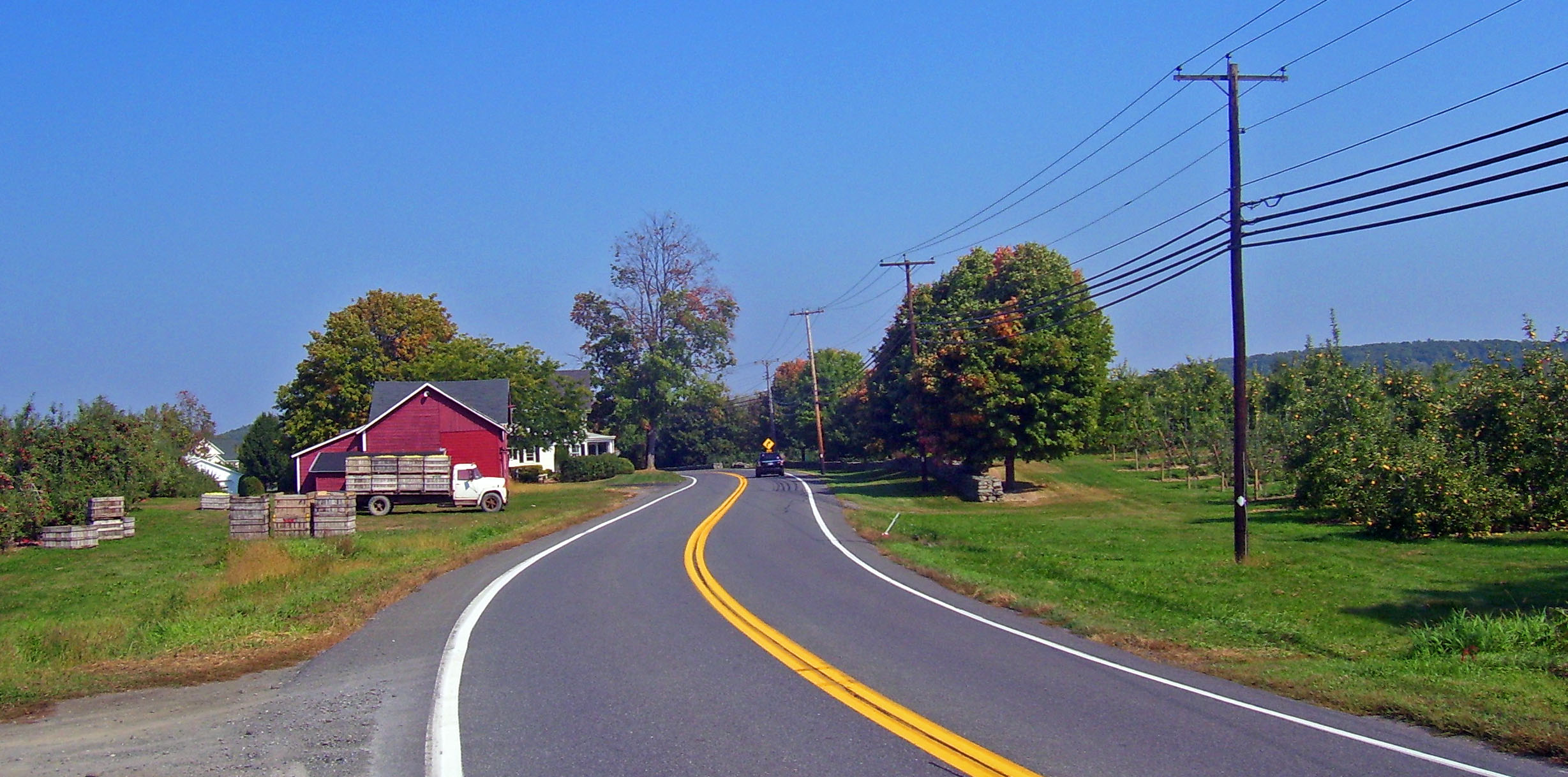
US 44 and NY 55 in orchards near Plattekill

US 44 begins at an intersection with US 209 and NY 55 west of the hamlet of Kerhonkson in the town of Wawarsing in Ulster County. NY 55, concurrent with US 209 southwest of this point, turns east onto US 44, forming an overlap as the two routes proceed eastward across Ulster County. Midway between Kerhonkson and Gardiner and just north of NY 299, US 44 and NY 55 traverse a hairpin turn made necessary by the surrounding Shawangunk Ridge. Just inside of Gardiner, the highway passes through Minnewaska State Park, a large state park in the Hudson Valley.

Farther east, the road passes through the hamlets of Clintondale and Modena where it crosses NY 32, and then meets US 9W in the hamlet of Highland. US 44 and NY 55 join US 9W for roughly a half-mile southward along the western bank of the Hudson River before separating at a trumpet interchange south of Highland. One mile east of US 9W, US 44 and NY 55 cross the Hudson on the Mid-Hudson Bridge.

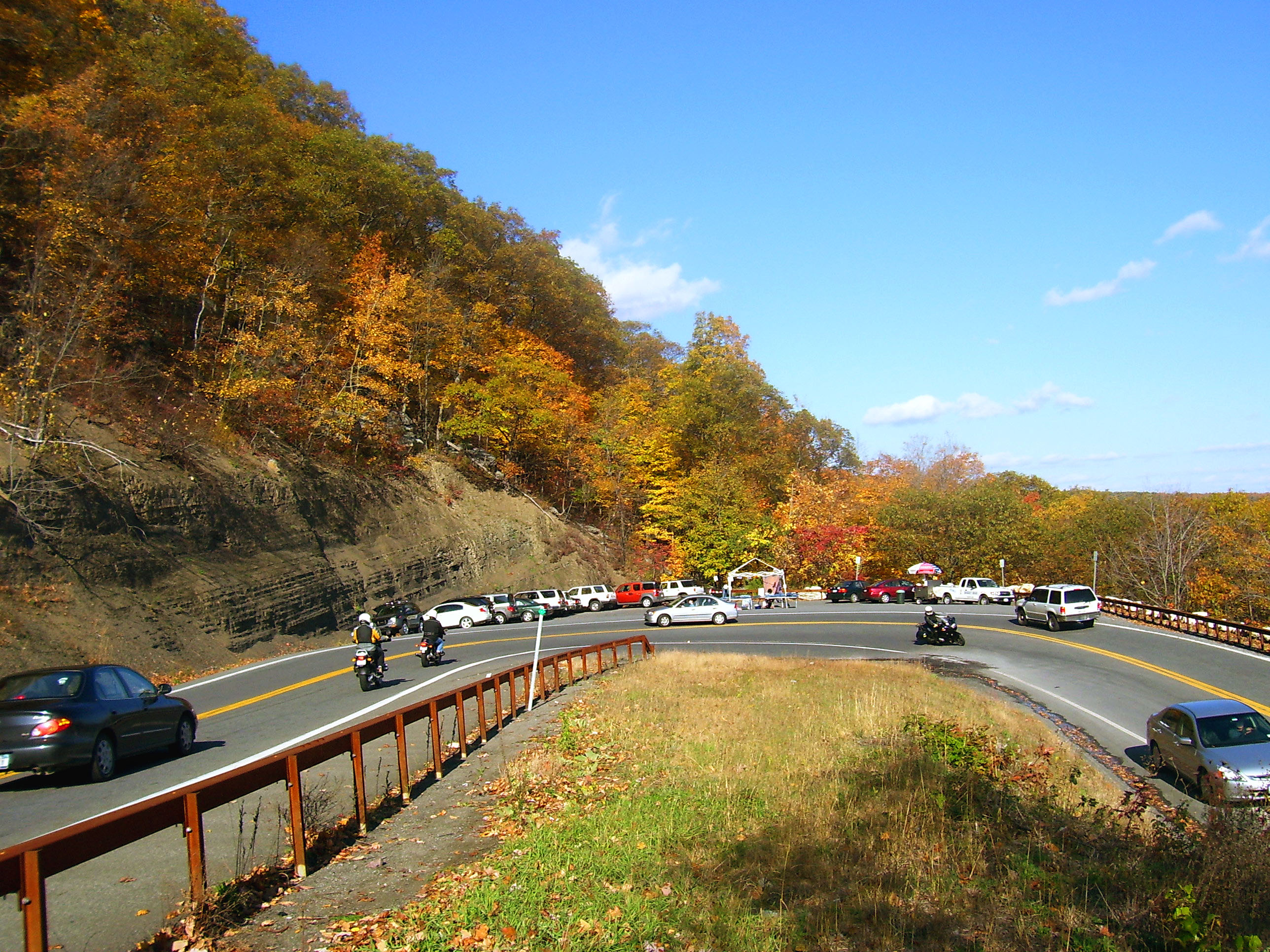
Hairpin turn on US 44 and NY 55 near Mohonk Preserve in New York's Shawangunk Mountains.

On the opposite bank in Dutchess County, US 44 and NY 55 enter the city of Poughkeepsie. In the downtown area, US 44 and NY 55 connect with US 9 by way of an interchange before splitting into a pair of parallel one-way streets. At the eastern end of the parallel roadways in Arlington, just outside Poughkeepsie, US 44 and NY 55 split upon meeting Main Street at an interchange. NY 55 continues southeast through the junction as Manchester Road; US 44, however, joins Main Street to the northeast along what becomes the Dutchess Turnpike. West of the interchange, state maintenance continues along Main Street for an additional 0.19 miles (0.31 km) to County Route 38 (CR 38, named Fairmont Avenue). This segment of Main Street is designated as NY 983W, an unsigned reference route. Past CR 38, Main Street becomes CR 114.

From Arlington, US 44 bends first to the north, then after 1.5 miles northeast, through intermittently developed areas, woodlots, and farms to the next settlement along its route, Pleasant Valley. In its commercial center the road widens to include a center turn lane. After crossing Wappinger Creek, it returns to two lanes.

The road returns to a more easterly course for two miles, then straightens out as it climbs steadily past the Newcomb–Brown Estate. It crests just before the interchange with the Taconic State Parkway. A mile past it, at the state police Troop K barracks, NY 82 joins from the north and the two roads overlap.

This concurrency ends after another mile, when US 44 diverges along the route of the former NY 44A, going around the village of Millbrook past the Mary Flagler Cary Arboretum, home to the Institute of Ecosystem Studies. The highway returns to a more due-east orientation as it passes north of the village, then gradually curves to the northeast again as it passes through a heavily farmed area.

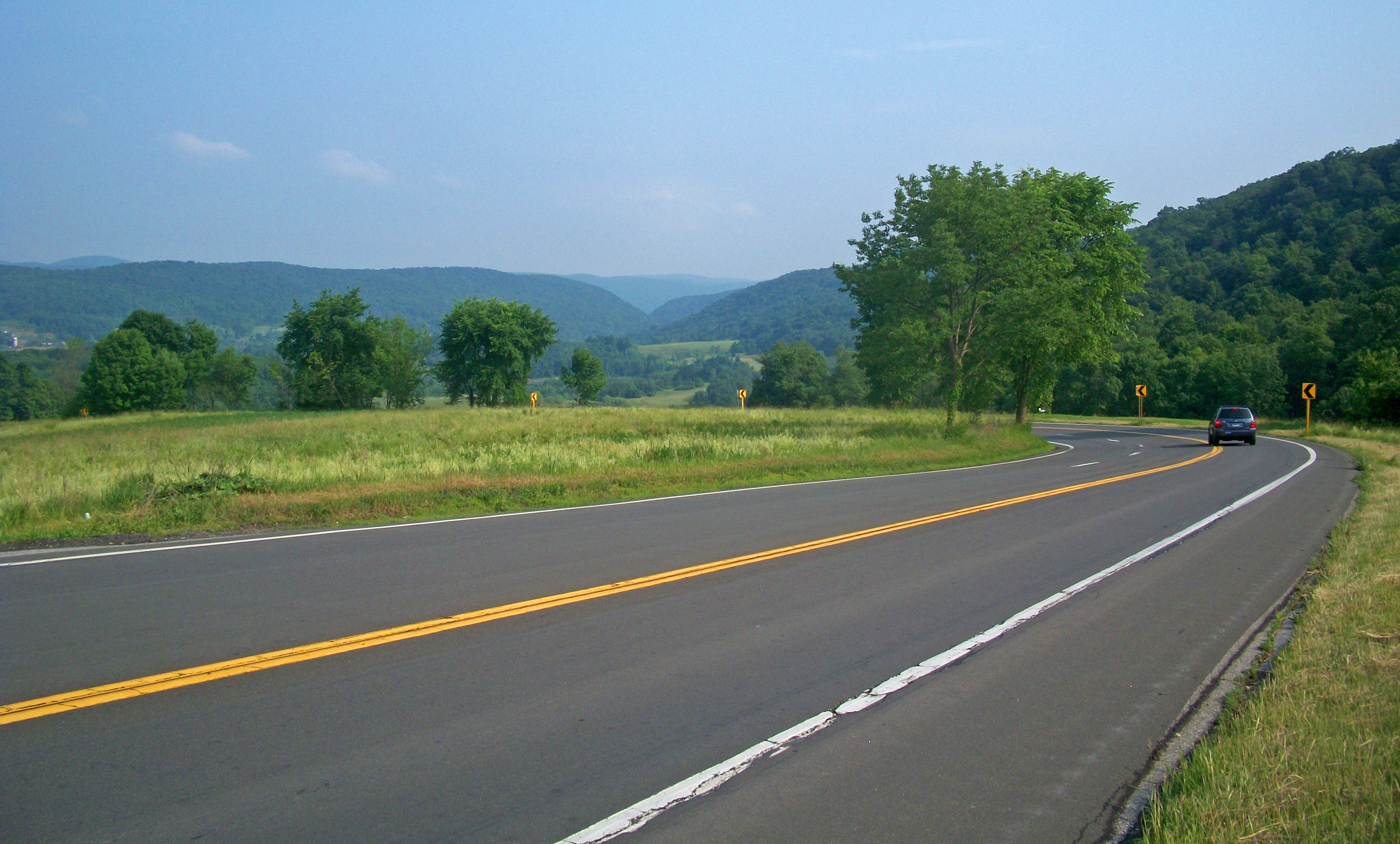
Harlem Valley from hairpin turn near Amenia

US 44 gradually descends into the upper Harlem Valley, with a sharp hairpin turn providing a panoramic view to the south. A gradual descent takes it into downtown Amenia. At the center of town, the highway turns north and replaces NY 343 as NY 22's overlap.

A seven-mile (11 km) journey over increasingly rolling and open terrain takes the two highways into the town of North East and towards Millerton. Just south of the village, NY 199 reaches its eastern terminus. The road enters Millerton on South Elm Street, making a sharp turn north that necessitates a concrete barrier and a lower speed limit just south of downtown.

At the traffic light just north of that bend, US 44 leaves NY 22 and turns right through Millerton's historic downtown. Maple Avenue on the south marks the former northern terminus of NY 361. After that junction, US 44 leaves the village. It passes some strip development on the south, bends slightly to the north and crosses the Connecticut state line just past a car dealership on the south.

=== Connecticut ===
For most of its journey through Connecticut, US 44 is known as the Jonathan Trumbull Highway. It is also known by more local names, including Albany Turnpike in Canton, West/East Main Street and Avon Mountain Road in Avon, Albany Avenue through West Hartford into Hartford, Boston Turnpike from Bolton Notch to Ashford, and Providence Pike near the Rhode Island border.

After entering the state from the town of North East, New York just east of the village of Millerton, US 44 is a rural arterial road. It is briefly duplexed with Route 41 for 1.67 miles (2.69 km) through the center of Salisbury. After crossing into North Canaan, it is duplexed with US 7 for 0.33 miles (0.53 km) through the village of Canaan. After leaving the village, it enters Norfolk, where it has a brief (0.34-mile [0.55 km]) concurrency with Route 272 in the center of town. After passing through the western part of Colebrook it enters the town of Winchester. As US 44 enters the village of Winsted, it begins a 2.14-mile (3.44 km) concurrency with Route 183, 0.33 miles (0.53 km) of which is joined by Route 8 in a triplex. At the east end of the village, Route 8 leaves to the south on an expressway, while Route 183 leaves to the south about 100 yards later. US 44 continues southeast through the towns of Barkhamsted, and New Hartford before entering Canton. In Canton, US 44 becomes a four-lane primary suburban arterial road as it is joined by US 202 for a 4.3-mile (6.9 km) concurrency to the center of Avon. As US 202 leaves to the north, US 44 is joined for the next 0.74 miles (1.19 km) by Route 10.

After climbing Avon Mountain, it enters West Hartford, passing along the northern part of the town and becoming an urban street as it entes the northern part of Hartford. After passing along Albany Avenue, and Main Street, US 44 turns east onto a pair of one-way streets (Morgan Street North and Morgan Street South) that straddle I-84 and US 6 and cross under I-91 with the only direct access being from Morgan Street South to I-91 South. US 44 then joins I-84 and US 6 for about 0.25 miles (0.40 km) to cross the Connecticut River on the Bulkeley Bridge into East Hartford before exiting almost immediately onto Connecticut Boulevard. It briefly duplexes with US 5 on Main Street in East Hartford center before turning east onto Burnside Avenue. After entering Manchester, it meets I-84 once again at exit 60, and is joined in a concurrency for the next seven miles (11 km) by US 6, which leaves its I-84 concurrency at this point.

The road then enters Bolton, where it meets the eastern terminus of I-384 at Bolton Notch. US 44 and US 6 briefly join the stub end of the expressway before US 6 splits off to the southeast. US 44 becomes more of a secondary rural road as it enters Coventry, where it briefly overlaps with Route 31. It then enters Mansfield, where it meets Route 195 at the "Four Corners", which provides access to the village of Storrs and the main campus of the University of Connecticut. After passing through Ashford, and Eastford, it turns north at Route 101 in Pomfret, which provides a more direct route to Providence. Shortly thereafter, Route 169 joins for a 2.25-mile (3.62 km) concurrency to the center of town. US 44 once again turns east, and then enters the town of Putnam. After a 0.64-mile (1.03 km) concurrency with Route 12, it meets I-395 at exit 47. 4.66 miles (7.50 km) to the east, US 44 crosses the Rhode Island state line into the town of Glocester.

=== Rhode Island ===
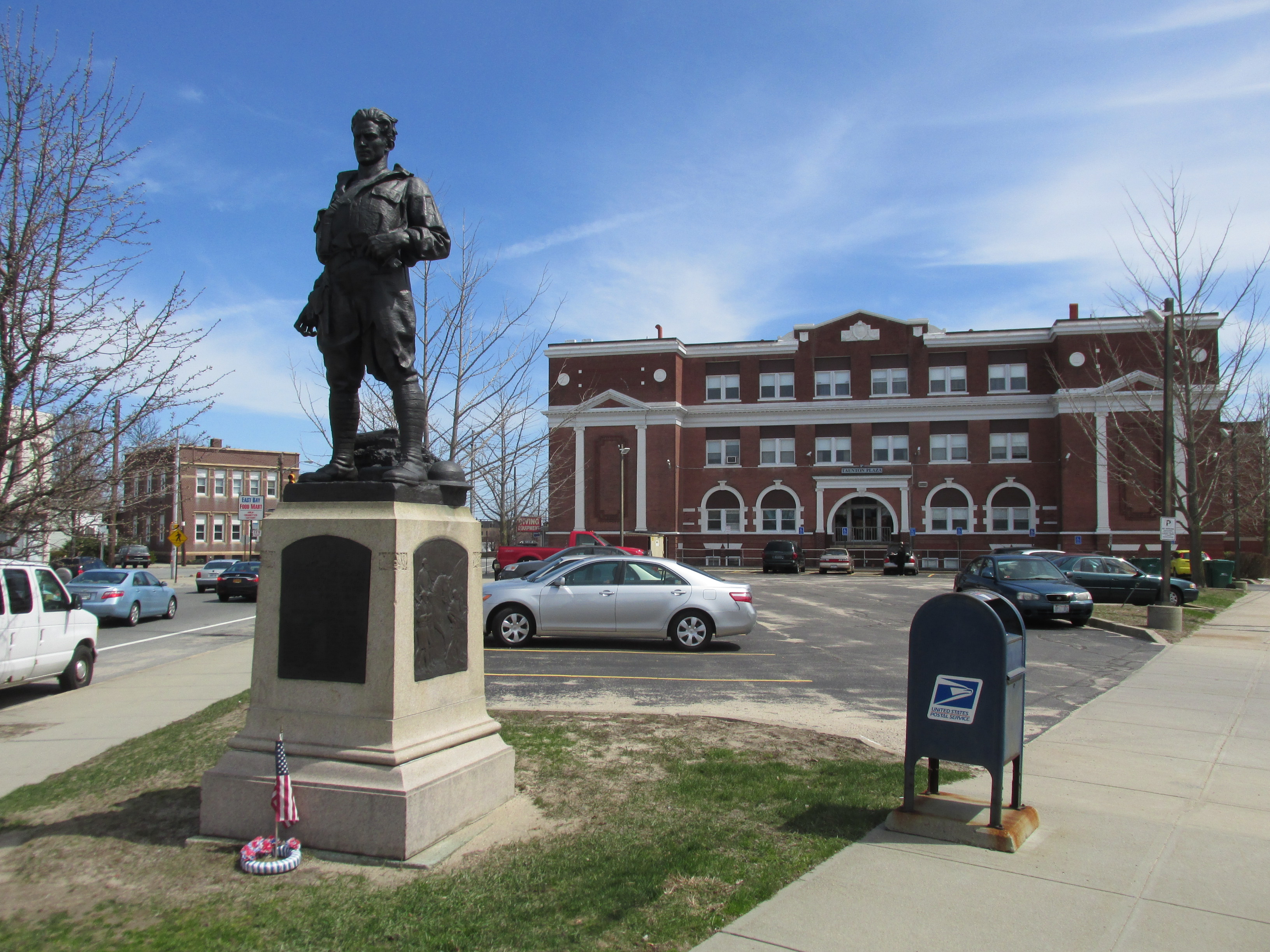
Taunton Plaza, at the triangle created by US 44 (Taunton Avenue), Whelden Avenue, and Broadway in East Providence, features a Doughboy statue by Pietro Montana and the former East Providence High School.

US 44 runs 26.2 miles (42.2 km) in Rhode Island. During this part of the road, US 44 is often referred to locally as "Putnam Pike" as the road runs through Rhode Island and into Putnam, Connecticut. US 44 enters the state at Glocester, traveling through Chepachet and Harmony, villages of Glocester, as it heads through the Waterman Reservoir towards the village of Greenville in the town of Smithfield. US 44 has a junction with I-295 in Smithfield at a cloverleaf interchange. Soon after the I-295 junction, US 44 enters the town of North Providence along Smith Street, then enters the city proper of Providence after another 1.7 miles (2.7 km). In downtown Providence, US 44 separates into one-way pairs. Eastbound US 44 runs along Canal Street and South Water Street (via a section of Memorial Boulevard). Westbound US 44 runs along South Main Street and North Main Street. US 1A joins US 44 at an intersection with Point Street and Wickenden Street. US 44 and US 1A join I-195/US 6 at Exit 1B (eastbound; old Exit 2 eastbound; the corresponding westbound exit was also formerly numbered Exit 2 but is now Exit 1C) as they cross the Seekonk River into East Providence. US 44 leaves I-195/US 6 at Exit 1C (eastbound; old Exit 4 eastbound) just after crossing the river and continues east towards the Massachusetts state line along Taunton Avenue.

=== Massachusetts ===
US 44 runs for 38.4 miles (61.8 km) in Massachusetts. It enters the state in the town of Seekonk along Taunton Avenue. It continues through the towns of Rehoboth and Dighton along the way to the city of Taunton. It continues eastward from Taunton through the towns of Raynham, Lakeville, Middleborough, Carver, Plympton and Kingston before reaching its eastern terminus at Plymouth. US 44 has interchanges with Route 24 in Raynham and with Interstate 495 in Middleborough. East of the Middleborough Rotary, US 44 becomes an arterial highway for five miles (8 km) until just past the intersection with Route 105, where it turns into a two-lane freeway with a guard rail acting as a median divider for three miles (5 km) until just before the intersection with Route 58. After that, it becomes a newly built, 7.5-mile-long (12.1 km) freeway section to Route 3 which bypasses the congested business district in Plymouth. US 44 has no access from Route 80 on the new bypass highway. (The old section of US 44 appeared on some maps starting in 2005 as Route 44A; however, Route 44A signs were not put up after the bypass was built, and the route has not appeared in the official route log of the Massachusetts Department of Transportation.) Near its eastern terminus, US 44 overlaps Route 3 for about 1.0-mile (1.6 km), then exits and continues as a surface road for approximately another half mile, ending at Route 3A.

In Rehoboth, US 44 passes near Anawan Rock, site of the capture of Anawan, the War Chief of the Pocasset People, in 1676. His capture marked the end of King Philip's War. In Middleborough, it passes by Oliver Mill Park, site of Judge Peter Oliver's 18th-century industrial complex. Ancient stone-walled waterways still remain here on the banks of the Nemasket River.

In Taunton, US 44 takes on a more urban character as it cuts through the heart of the city. The route runs along the south side of Taunton Green, flanked by shops, businesses, and government buildings.

US 44 in Massachusetts
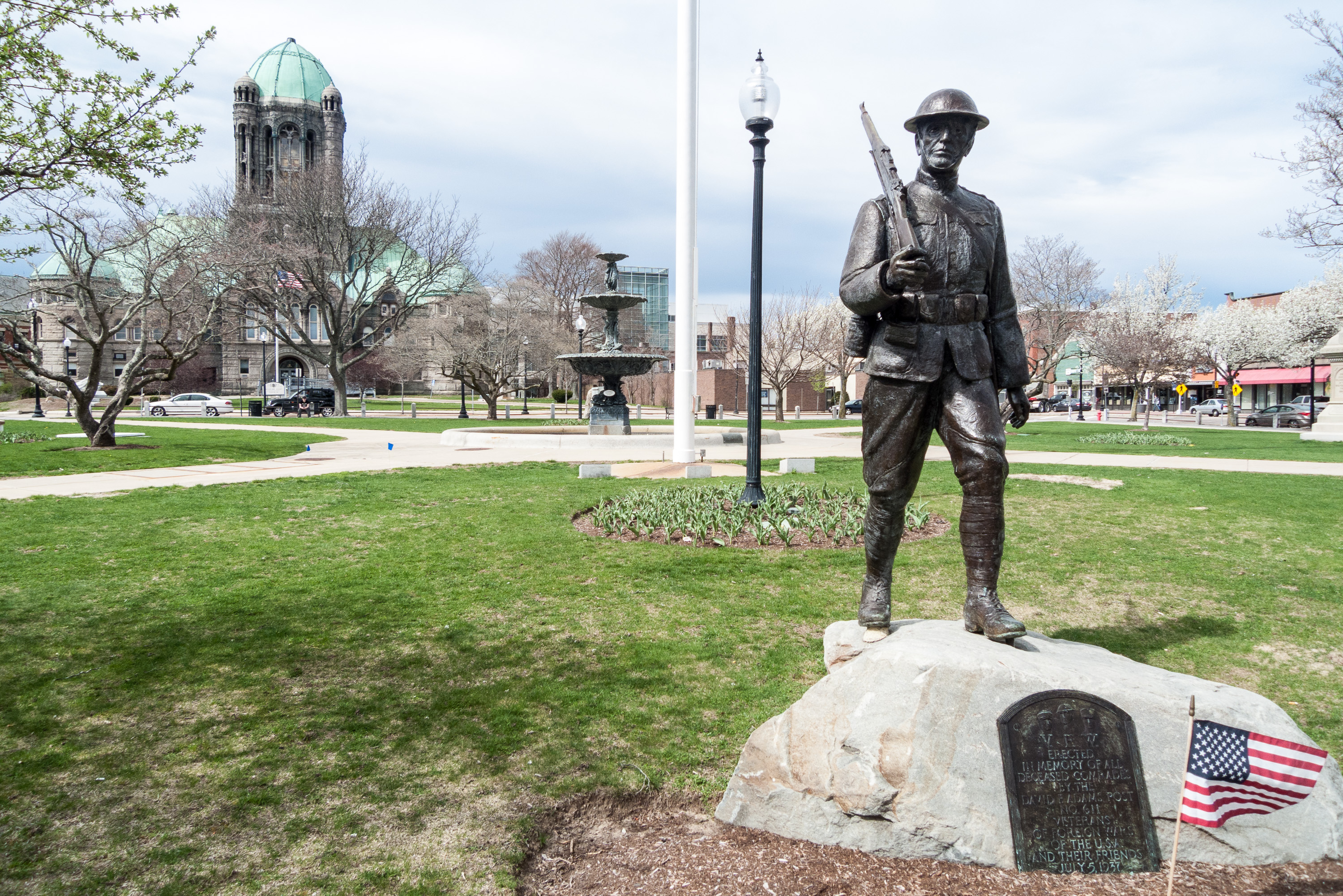
Taunton Green

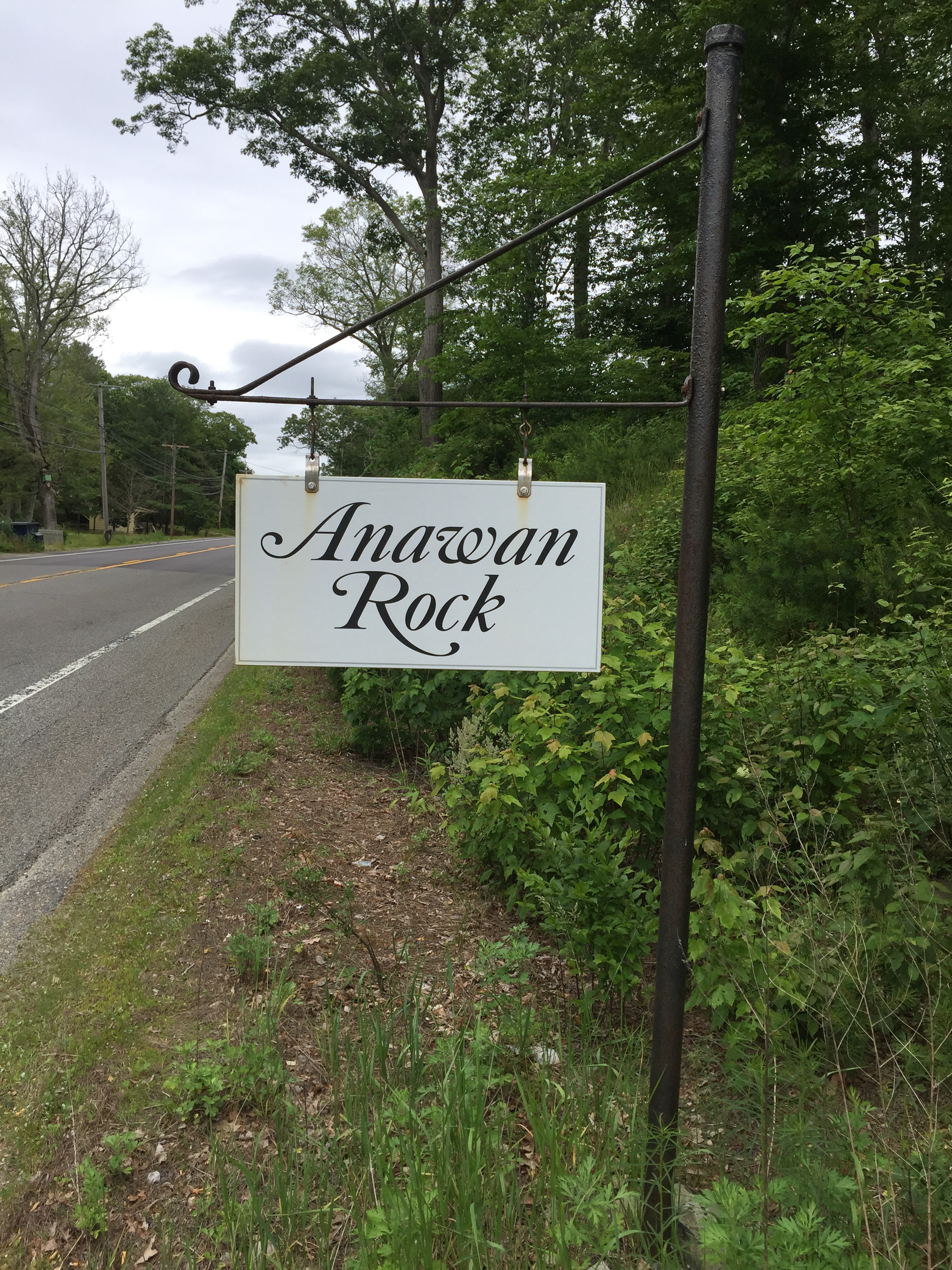
Roadside sign for Anawan Rock in Rehoboth, Massachusetts

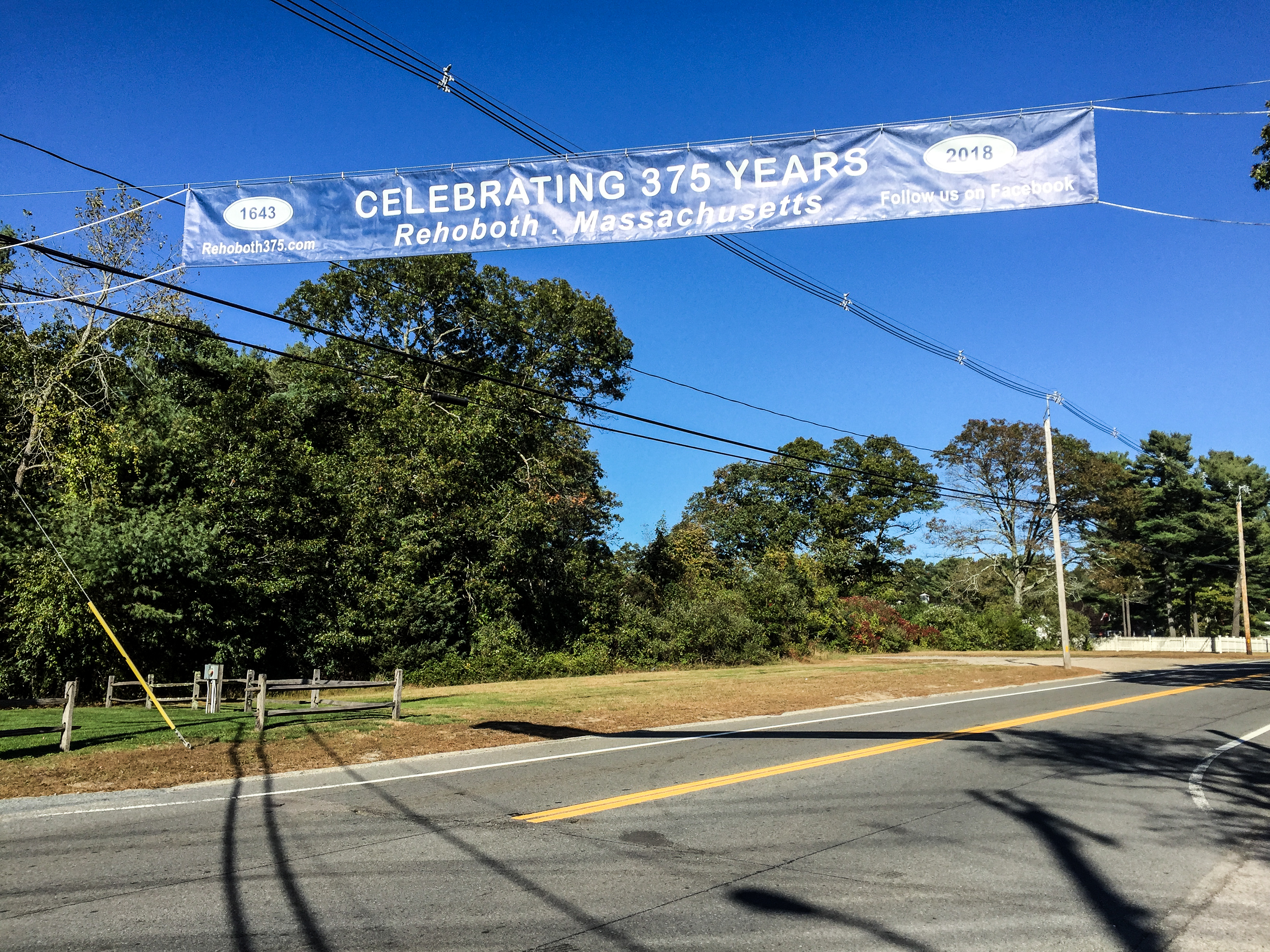
Banner across US 44 notes the 375th anniversary of Rehoboth in 2018

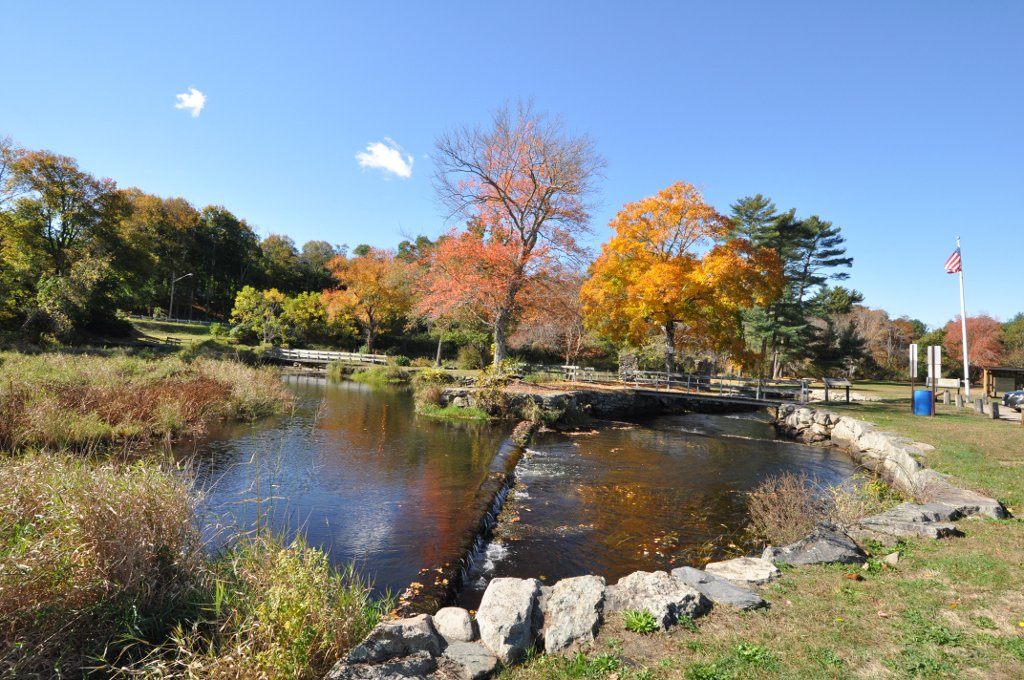
Oliver Mill Park

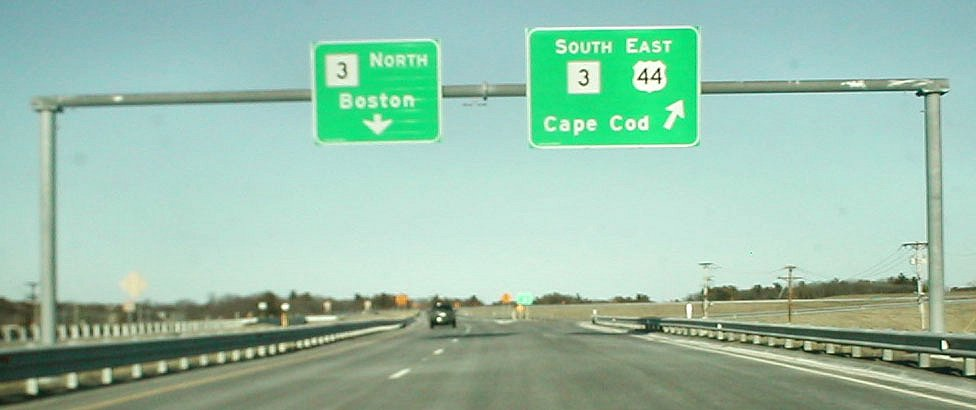
Looking east on the new US 44 freeway at Route 3 in Plymouth.

== History ==
=== New York ===
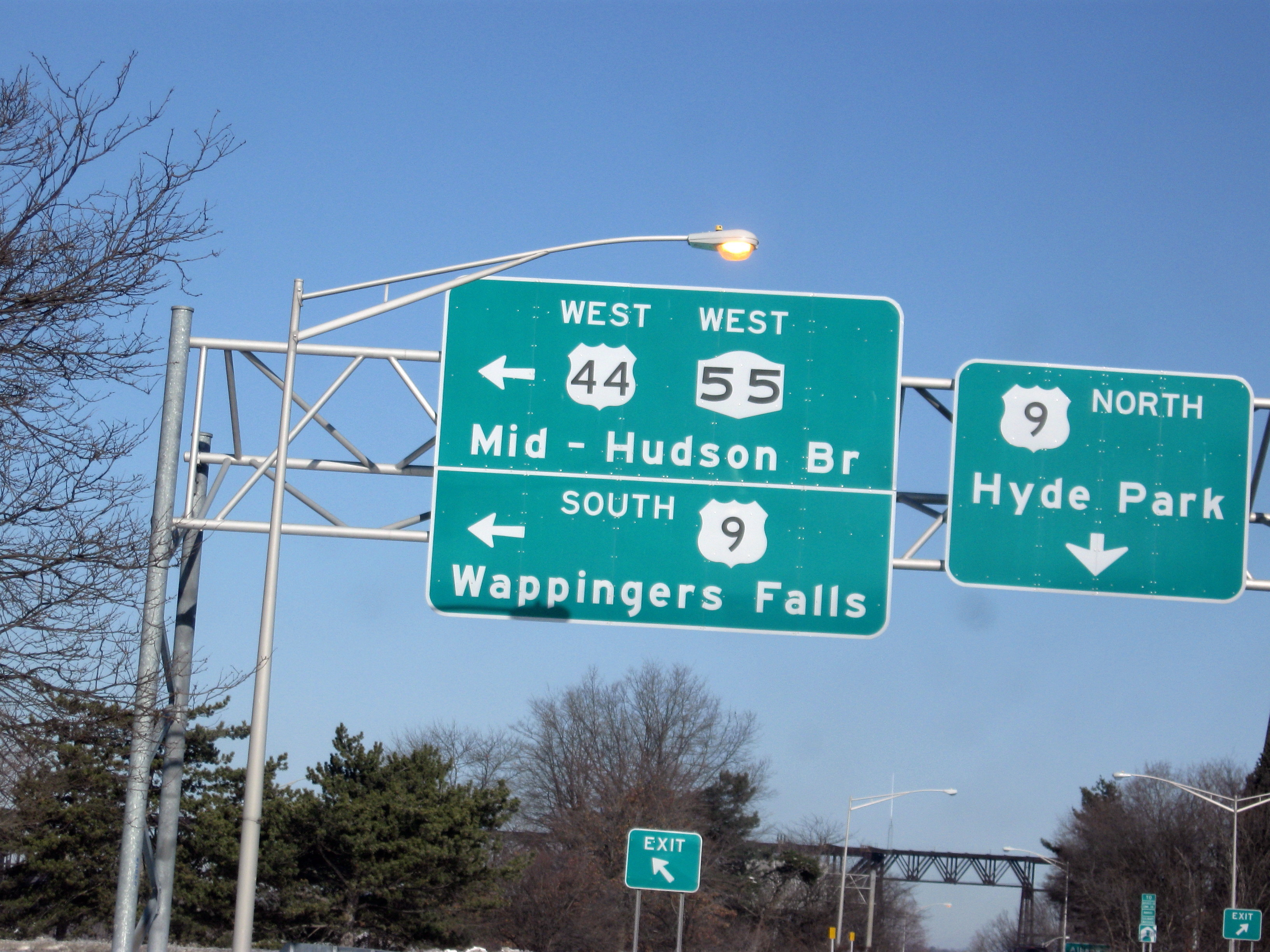
The exit for US 44 and NY 55 near the Mid-Hudson Bridge from US 9

The portion of US 44 between Poughkeepsie and Amenia was the main line of an early toll road known as the Dutchess Turnpike. The turnpike continued past Amenia into the Connecticut town of Sharon along modern NY 343. Between the Wallkill River near the hamlet of Gardiner and the hamlet of Ardonia, modern US 44 was also roughly located along another early toll road known as the Farmer's Turnpike. The Farmer's Turnpike continued east past Ardonia to the village of Milton where a ferry across the Hudson River once existed.

In 1924, when state highways were first marked by route numbers in New York, the main line of the Dutchess Turnpike was designated as NY 21. Other portions of modern US 44, aside from the overlap with NY 22, were unnumbered in the 1920s. In the 1930 renumbering of state highways in New York, the old NY 21 was partitioned into three numbered routes. Between Poughkeepsie and South Millbrook, old NY 21 became the western half of NY 200, which continued east to Dover Plains using the Dover branch route of the Dutchess Turnpike (modern NY 343). The section from South Millbrook to Amenia became part of NY 82A, which continued past Amenia to Pine Plains. The easternmost section from Amenia to the Connecticut line was designated as NY 343. West of the Hudson River, NY 55 was also designated in 1930 between Barryville and Pawling, running along the portion of modern US 44 between Kerhonkson and Poughkeepsie.

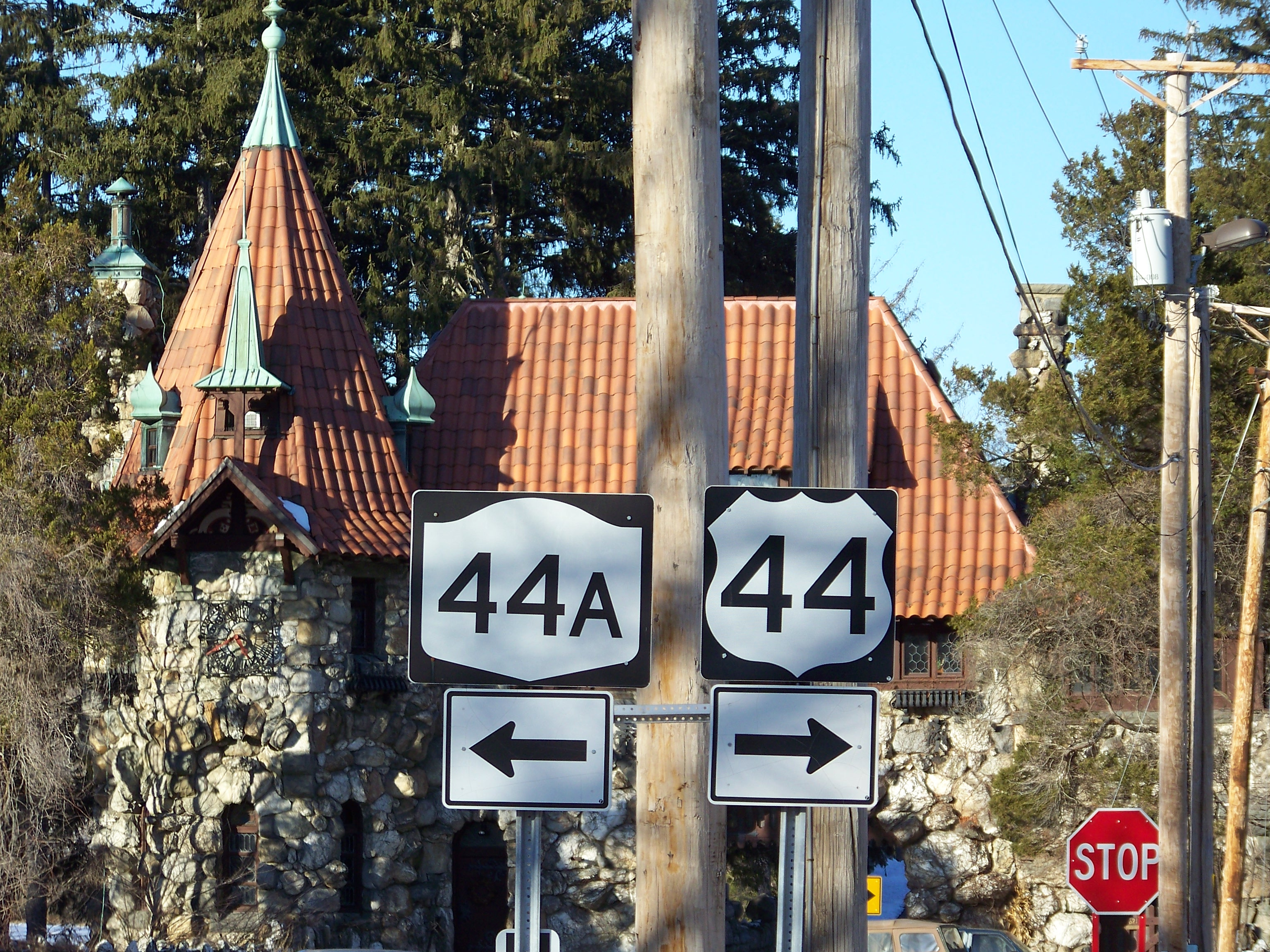
Signage for former NY 44A in February 2008; signs were not taken down for two more months

US 44 was assigned c. 1935. West of the Hudson River, it was overlaid on the pre-existing NY 55, with US 44 officially beginning at US 209, which was also extended into New York c. 1935. East of the river, US 44 was routed on the original Dutchess Turnpike main line from Poughkeepsie to Amenia, supplanting NY 200 west of South Millbrook, NY 82A west of Amenia, and a short portion of NY 343 between NY 82A and the hamlet of Amenia. US 44 left the turnpike at Amenia and followed NY 22 north to Millerton, where it continued east on a short piece of former NY 199 into Connecticut. The alignments of NY 200 and NY 343 were flipped as part of US 44's assignment.

US 44 originally entered the village of Millbrook via NY 82, North Avenue, and Franklin Avenue. On April 1, 1980, the state of New York assumed ownership of a highway bypassing Millbrook to the west and north as part of a highway maintenance swap between the state and Dutchess County. The newly acquired roadway was designated as NY 44A. On June 5, 2007, NYSDOT announced that US 44 would be permanently realigned onto NY 44A. All shields along NY 44A were replaced with US 44 signage, and the NY 44A designation ceased to exist. NYSDOT will continue to perform maintenance on US 44's former routing through Millbrook. The portion of the routing that did not overlap NY 82 is now NY 984P, an unsigned reference route.

=== Connecticut ===
Most of the alignment of modern US 44 in Connecticut was at one time part of an early network of turnpikes in the state during the 19th century. From the New York state line at Salisbury to the village of Lakeville, the route was the westernmost section of the Salisbury and Canaan Turnpike. Between North Canaan and New Hartford, modern US 44 was known as the Greenwoods Turnpike. The southeastward continuation of the Greenwoods road to the West Hartford-Hartford line was known as the Talcott Mountain Turnpike. From East Hartford to Eastford, the Boston Turnpike was chartered mostly along modern US 44 as the direct route from Hartford to Boston. The Boston Turnpike differed from modern US 44 by using a more direct route between Eastford and Pomfret Center along modern Route 244, while US 44 runs via the village of Abington. Past Pomfret Center, the Boston Turnpike diverged from modern US 44 heading northeast across the town of Thompson. The route through Putnam to the Rhode Island state line was a different turnpike road known as the Pomfret and Killingly Turnpike.

In 1922, the New England states designated route numbers on its main roads. Route 101 was assigned as the route used by the Pomfret and Killingly Turnpike (modern US 44) to Pomfret Center, then modern US 44 to Phoenixville via Abington (short portions of two other turnpike roads), then a road southward from Phoenixville to South Chaplin (modern Route 198), ending at New England Route 3. The direct road connecting Phoenixville to Bolton Notch was designated as Route 109. From Hartford to Bolton Notch, modern US 44 was at the time known as New England Route 3. West of Hartford, modern US 44 was designated as part of New England Route 17, which stretched in Connecticut from North Canaan to Stonington (via modern Route 2). Between the New York state line at Salisbury and North Canaan, the road was known as Route 121.

In 1926, most of New England Route 3 became U.S. Route 6. In the 1932 state highway renumbering, New England Route 17 was broken up into two newly assigned routes: modern Route 2 east of Hartford, and part of Route 101 west of Hartford. Route 101 was reconfigured in 1932 from its 1920s alignment to continue west of Phoenixville along former Route 109, then overlapping with US 6 to Hartford. Route 101 then used the western half of former New England Route 17 to North Canaan where it ended. The road from North Canaan to Salisbury was renumbered in 1932 to Route 199 to match the route number in New York at the time. In 1935, US 44 was designated and utilized Route 101 across the states of Connecticut, Rhode Island, and Massachusetts. Route 199 was also incorporated into the new route, connecting with the New York state line.

==== US 44A ====

In the 1940s, US 44 was relocated along a portion of the Wilbur Cross Highway for several years with the former surface alignment becoming US 44A. The change was later reversed. US 6 was also relocated in East Hartford and Manchester to use I-84 and the concurrency between US 6 and US 44 is now only between Manchester and Bolton Notch.

=== Rhode Island and Massachusetts ===
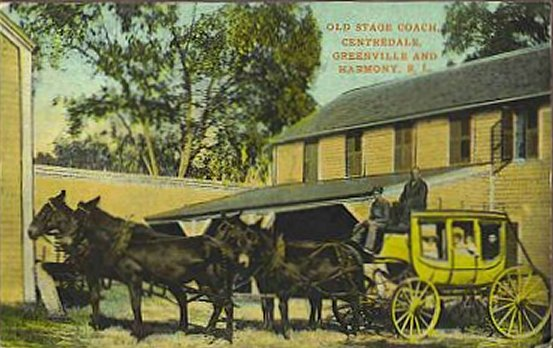
Stagecoach on US 44 in Glocester around the start of the 20th century.

In the 19th century, almost all of the alignment of modern US 44 in Rhode Island was part of an early turnpike route. From the Connecticut line in Putnam to the Smithfield town line, what is now the Putnam Pike was part of the West Glocester Turnpike (Connecticut line to Chepachet) and the Glocester Turnpike (Chepachet to Smithfield line). The continuation of the road in Smithfield and North Providence was another turnpike road known as the Powder Hill Turnpike, running along the alignment of modern Smith Street. Between East Providence and Taunton, the road was part of yet another turnpike, the Taunton and Providence Turnpike, running along modern Taunton Avenue and Winthrop Street.

In 1922, when the New England states first assigned route numbers to its main thoroughfares, the route from Putnam through Providence and Taunton to Plymouth was designated as Route 101. Route 101 extended across Rhode Island and Massachusetts along modern US 44, with an extension into Connecticut along an alignment different from US 44. In 1932, Connecticut relocated its Route 101 to the modern US 44 alignment, with the route now extending across the three states from North Canaan in Connecticut to Plymouth in Massachusetts. In 1935, the multi-state Route 101 was incorporated into newly designated US 44. Connecticut and Rhode Island reassigned the Route 101 designation to a much shorter but parallel alignment between the two states.

On December 14, 2005, a freeway realignment opened to the north of the original surface alignment US 44 in the towns of Carver and Plymouth. US 44 was rerouted onto the new expressway and now runs concurrent with Route 3 from the latter freeway's exit 16 (old exit 7), where the new freeway ends, south to exit 15A (old exit 6A), where US 44 rejoins its former alignment.

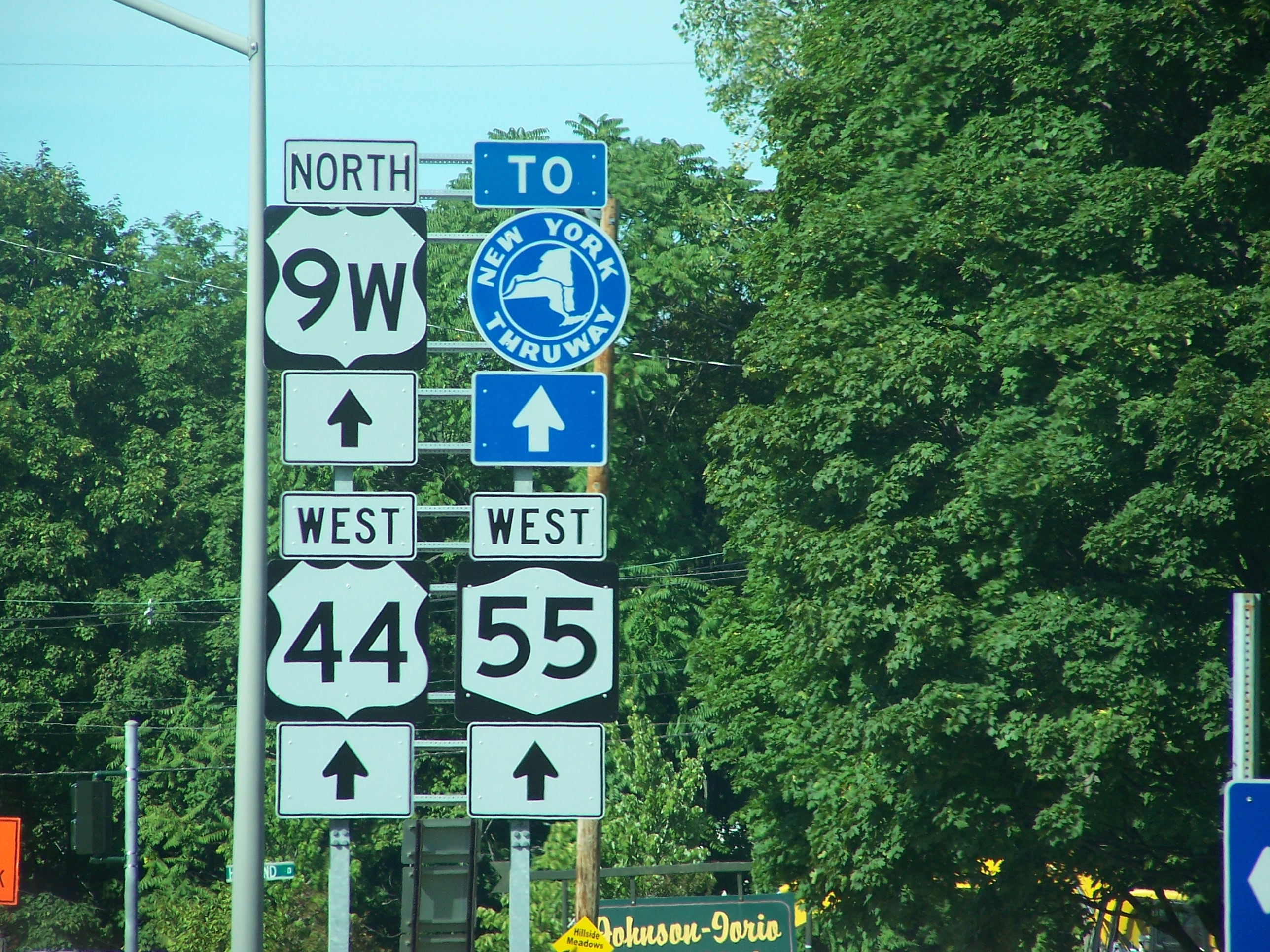
A directional assembly showing the US 9W/US 44/NY 55 concurrency west of the Mid-Hudson Bridge.

== Major intersections ==
Exit numbers concurrent with I-195 in Rhode Island converted to mileage-based exit numbering in 2020. Exit numbers concurrent with Route 3 in Massachusetts converted in late summer 2020.

State	County	Location	mi	km	Old exit	New exit	Destinations	Notes
New York	Ulster	Wawarsing	0.00	0.00			US 209 / NY 55 west – Ellenville, Kerhonkson, Kingston	Western terminus; western end of NY 55 concurrency; hamlet of Kerhonkson
New York	Ulster	Town of Gardiner	10.42	16.77			NY 299 east (CR 8) to I-87 / New York Thruway – New Paltz	Western terminus of NY 299
New York	Ulster	Town of Gardiner	16.30	26.23			NY 208 – New Paltz, Wallkill	Hamlet of Ireland Corners
New York	Ulster	Town of Plattekill	17.76	28.58			NY 32 to I-87 / New York Thruway – New Paltz, Plattekill	Hamlet of Modena
New York	Ulster	Lloyd	27.68	44.55			US 9W north to I-87 / New York Thruway – Kingston	Western end of US 9W concurrency; hamlet of Highland
New York	Ulster	Lloyd	28.24	45.45			US 9W south – Newburgh	Interchange; eastern end of US 9W concurrency; last eastbound exit before toll
New York	Hudson River		29.92	48.15	Franklin D. Roosevelt Mid-Hudson Bridge (eastbound toll)			
New York	Dutchess	City of Poughkeepsie	30.49	49.07			US 9 to I-84 – Wappingers Falls, Hyde Park	Interchange
New York	Dutchess	City of Poughkeepsie	30.75	49.49			US 44 / NY 55	Begin one-way pairs (East–West Arterial)
New York	Dutchess	City of Poughkeepsie	32.05	51.58			NY 115 north to CR 75	Southern terminus of NY 115 (at US 44/NY 55 west)
New York	Dutchess	Town of Poughkeepsie	32.46	52.24			NY 376 south	Northern terminus of NY 376 (at US 44/NY 55 west)
New York	Dutchess	Town of Poughkeepsie	32.72	52.66			NY 55 east – Pawling	Eastern end of NY 55 concurrency; eastbound exit and westbound entrance
New York	Dutchess	Town of Poughkeepsie	32.72	52.66			Main Street west	Interchange; westbound exit and eastbound entrance
New York	Dutchess	Town of Pleasant Valley	38.18	61.44	Bridge over Wappinger Creek			
New York	Dutchess	Town of Pleasant Valley	41.86	67.37			Taconic State Parkway	Exit 54 on Taconic State Parkway
New York	Dutchess	Town of Pleasant Valley	42.57	68.51			NY 82 north – Stanfordville, Pine Plains	Western end of NY 82 concurrency; hamlet of Washington Hollow
New York	Dutchess	Washington	43.71	70.34			NY 82 south – Millbrook	Eastern end of NY 82 concurrency; former routing of US 44
New York	Dutchess	Millbrook	46.82	75.35			To NY 82 / NY 343 east	Access via NY 984P
New York	Dutchess	Amenia	56.39	90.75			NY 22 south / NY 343 – Dover Plains, Sharon, CT	Western end of NY 22 concurrency; hamlet of Amenia
New York	Dutchess	North East	63.39	102.02			NY 199 – Pine Plains	
New York	Dutchess	Millerton	64.98	104.58			NY 22 north	Eastern end of NY 22 concurrency
			65.98 0.00	106.18 0.00	New York–Connecticut state line			
Connecticut	Litchfield	Lakeville	1.18	1.90			Route 112 east – Lime Rock	Western terminus of Route 112
Connecticut	Litchfield	Lakeville	3.06	4.92			Route 41 south – Sharon	Western end of Route 41 concurrency
Connecticut	Litchfield	Salisbury	4.73	7.61			Route 41 north – Great Barrington, MA	Eastern end of Route 41 concurrency
Connecticut	Litchfield	North Canaan	8.88	14.29			Route 126 south – Falls Village	Northern terminus of Route 126
Connecticut	Litchfield	Community of Canaan	11.19	18.01			US 7 north – Sheffield, MA, Great Barrington, MA	Western end of US 7 concurrency
Connecticut	Litchfield	Community of Canaan	11.52	18.54			US 7 south – Falls Village	Eastern end of US 7 concurrency
Connecticut	Litchfield	Community of Norfolk	18.38	29.58			Route 272 north – North Norfolk, Campbell Falls, Southfield, MA	Western end of Route 272 concurrency
Connecticut	Litchfield	Community of Norfolk	18.72	30.13			Route 272 south – Torrington	Eastern end of Route 272 concurrency
Connecticut	Litchfield	Town of Norfolk	20.14	32.41			Route 182 east – Colebrook	Western terminus of Route 182
Connecticut	Litchfield	Winsted	26.74	43.03			Route 183 north – Colebrook	Western end of Route 183 concurrency
Connecticut	Litchfield	Winsted	27.41	44.11			Route 263 west – Winchester	Eastern terminus of Route 263
Connecticut	Litchfield	Winsted	28.36	45.64			Route 8 north – Colebrook, Riverton	Western end of Route 8 concurrency
Connecticut	Litchfield	Winsted	28.83	46.40			Route 8 south – Torrington, Waterbury	Eastern end of Route 8 concurrency
Connecticut	Litchfield	Winsted	28.88	46.48			Route 183 south – Torrington	Eastern end of Route 183 concurrency
Connecticut	Litchfield	Barkhamsted	31.96	51.43			Route 318 north – Pleasant Valley, Riverton, Bradley International Airport	Northern terminus of Route 318
Connecticut	Litchfield	Barkhamsted	32.87	52.90			Route 181 north – Pleasant Valley, Riverton	Southern terminus of Route 181
Connecticut	Litchfield	New Hartford	34.43	55.41			Route 219 – Ski Sundown, East Hartland, Torrington	
Connecticut	Hartford	Canton	38.77	62.39			US 202 west / Route 179 – Collinsville, Farmington	US 202 not signed westbound
Connecticut	Hartford	Canton	38.96– 39.05	62.70– 62.84			US 202 west / Route 179 south – Collinsville, Torrington	Western end of US 202 concurrency; westbound exit and eastbound entrance
Connecticut	Hartford	Canton	40.72	65.53			Dowd Avenue (SR 565 west)	
Connecticut	Hartford	Canton	41.07	66.10			Route 177 south – Unionville	Northern terminus of Route 177
Connecticut	Hartford	Simsbury	42.29	68.06			Route 167 – Simsbury, Unionville	
Connecticut	Hartford	Avon	44.28	71.26			US 202 east / Route 10 north – Simsbury	Eastern end of US 202 concurrency; western end of Route 10 concurrency
Connecticut	Hartford	Avon	45.02	72.45			Route 10 south – Farmington	Eastern end of Route 10 concurrency
Connecticut	Hartford	West Hartford	49.29	79.32			Route 218 east – Bloomfield	Western terminus of Route 218
Connecticut	Hartford	Hartford	51.03	82.12			Route 189 north – Bloomfield, Simsbury	Southern terminus of Route 189
Connecticut	Hartford	Hartford	51.90	83.52			Route 187 north – Blue Hills, Bloomfield	Southern terminus of Route 187
Connecticut	Hartford	Hartford	53.80	86.58	Western end of freeway section			
Connecticut	Hartford	Hartford	53.80	86.58	50	62A	I-84 west (US 6 west) – Waterbury	Western end of I-84/US 6 concurrency; exit 62A on I-84
Connecticut	Hartford	Hartford	53.80	86.58	51-52	62B-C	I-91 – Bradley International Airport, Springfield, New Haven	Access to I-91 north via Columbus Boulevard; exit 38A on I-91
Connecticut	Hartford	East Hartford	54.03	86.95	53	63A	I-84 east (US 6 east) / East River Drive – Boston	Eastern end of I-84/US 6 concurrency; eastbound exit and westbound entrance
Connecticut	Hartford	East Hartford	54.03	86.95	Eastern end of freeway section			
Connecticut	Hartford	East Hartford	55.05	88.59			US 5 south – Wethersfield	Western end of US 5 concurrency
Connecticut	Hartford	East Hartford	55.41	89.17			US 5 north – South Windsor	Eastern end of US 5 concurrency
Connecticut	Hartford	Town of Manchester	59.12– 59.33	95.14– 95.48			I-84 / US 6 west – Hartford, Boston	Western end of US 6 concurrency; exit 68 on I-84
Connecticut	Hartford	Community of Manchester	61.17	98.44			West Center Street (SR 502 west)	
Connecticut	Hartford	Community of Manchester	61.91	99.63			Route 83 – Vernon, Glastonbury	
Connecticut	Tolland	Bolton	65.07	104.72			Route 85 south / Cidermill Road (SR 533 north) – Bolton Center, Gay City State Park	Northern terminus of Route 85
Connecticut	Tolland	Bolton	65.86	105.99			I-384 west – Manchester, Hartford	Interchange; westbound exit and eastbound entrance; eastern terminus of I-384; former I-84
Connecticut	Tolland	Bolton	66.23	106.59			US 6 east – Willimantic, Providence	Interchange; eastbound exit and westbound entrance; eastern end of US 6 concurrency
Connecticut	Tolland	Coventry	69.15	111.29			Route 31 north – Rockville	Western end of Route 31 concurrency
Connecticut	Tolland	Coventry	70.25	113.06			Route 31 south – Coventry, Willimantic	Eastern end of Route 31 concurrency
Connecticut	Tolland	Mansfield	73.99	119.08			Route 32 – South Willington, Eagleville	
Connecticut	Tolland	Mansfield	76.58	123.24			Route 195 – Tolland, Merrow	To University of Connecticut
Connecticut	Windham	Ashford	81.71	131.50			Route 74 west to I-84 – East Willington	Eastern terminus of Route 74
Connecticut	Windham	Ashford	82.77	133.21			Route 89 – Westford	
Connecticut	Windham	Eastford	86.91	139.87			Route 198 – Eastford, Chaplin	
Connecticut	Windham	Pomfret	91.46	147.19			Route 97 – Hampton	
Connecticut	Windham	Pomfret	93.59	150.62			Route 101 east to I-395 – Providence	Western terminus of Route 101
Connecticut	Windham	Pomfret	94.09	151.42			Route 169 south – Brooklyn	Western end of Route 169 concurrency
Connecticut	Windham	Pomfret	96.24	154.88			Route 97 south / Route 169 north – Woodstock	Eastern end of Route 169 concurrency; northern terminus of Route 97
Connecticut	Windham	Community of Putnam	99.90	160.77			Route 12 south to I-395 – Killingly	Western end of Route 12 concurrency
Connecticut	Windham	Community of Putnam	100.34	161.48			Route 171 west – Woodstock	Eastern terminus of Route 171
Connecticut	Windham	Community of Putnam	100.54	161.80			Route 12 north – Grosvenordale	Eastern end of Route 12 concurrency
Connecticut	Windham	Community of Putnam	101.34	163.09			I-395 – Worcester, Norwich	Exit 47 on I-395; former Route 52
Connecticut	Windham	Town of Putnam	102.21	164.49			Route 21 to Route 193 – Thompson, Danielson	
			106.00 0.00	170.59 0.00	Connecticut–Rhode Island state line			
Rhode Island	Providence	Glocester	1.60	2.57			Route 94 south (Reynolds Road)	Northern terminus of Route 94
Rhode Island	Providence	Chepachet	6.80	10.94			Route 100 north (Money Hill Road) / Route 102 north to Route 98	Southern terminus of Route 100; western end of Route 102 concurrency
Rhode Island	Providence	Chepachet	7.40	11.91			Route 102 south (Chopmist Hill Road)	Eastern end of Route 102 concurrency
Rhode Island	Providence	Greenville	14.10	22.69			Route 116 south (Smith Avenue)	Western end of Route 116 concurrency
Rhode Island	Providence	Greenville	14.20	22.85			Route 116 north (Pleasant View Avenue)	Eastern end of Route 116 concurrency
Rhode Island	Providence	Greenville	15.20	24.46			Route 5 (Cedar Swamp Road)	
Rhode Island	Providence	Smithfield	16.00	25.75			I-295 – Warwick, New York, Lincoln, Boston	Exit 12 on I-295
Rhode Island	Providence	Johnston	17.60	28.32			Route 128 south (George Waterman Road)	Northern terminus of Route 128
Rhode Island	Providence	North Providence	17.80	28.65			Route 104 north (Waterman Avenue)	Southern terminus of Route 104
Rhode Island	Providence	North Providence	17.85	28.73			Route 15 east (Mineral Spring Avenue)	Western terminus of Route 15
Rhode Island	Providence	Providence	22.00	35.41			US 1 south (Gaspee Street)	Western end of US 1 concurrency
Rhode Island	Providence	Providence	22.10	35.57	Smith Street Bridge over the Woonasquatucket River			
Rhode Island	Providence	Providence	22.12	35.60			US 1 north (North Main Street) / Route 246 north to Route 7 / Route 146	Eastern end of US 1 concurrency; To Route 126/Route 122 via US 1 North and Southern terminus of Route 246
Rhode Island	Providence	Providence	23.20	37.34			US 1A south (Point Street Bridge) to I-95	Western end of US 1A concurrency
Rhode Island	Providence	Providence	23.80	38.30	Western end of freeway section			
Rhode Island	Providence	Providence	23.80	38.30	2	1C	I-195 west / US 6 west to I-95 / Route 10 / Route 146	Western end of I-195/US 6 concurrency; westbound exit and eastbound entrance
Rhode Island	Providence	Providence	24.00	38.62	3	1D	Gano Street – India Point, Fox Point	Westbound exit and eastbound entrance
Rhode Island	Providence	Seekonk River	24.10	38.79	Washington Bridge			
Rhode Island	Providence	East Providence	24.20	38.95	4	1B	I-195 east / US 6 east / US 1A north – Fall River MA, Attleboro MA	Eastern end of I-195/US 6/US 1A concurrency; eastbound exit and westbound entrance
Rhode Island	Providence	East Providence	24.40	39.27	–	1C	Veterans Parkway / Warren Avenue – Riverside	No entrance ramps
Rhode Island	Providence	East Providence	24.40	39.27	Eastern end of freeway section			
Rhode Island	Providence	East Providence	25.90	41.68			US 1A / Route 114 (Pawtucket Avenue) to I-195	
			26.30 0.00	42.33 0.00	Rhode Island–Massachusetts state line			
Massachusetts	Bristol	Seekonk	0.30	0.48			Route 114A – South Seekonk, Barrington RI, Rumford RI, Pawtucket, RI	
Massachusetts	Bristol	Rehoboth	6.00	9.66			Route 118 – Swansea, Attleboro	
Massachusetts	Bristol	Taunton	14.40	23.17			Route 138 / Route 140 north – Raynham, Somerset, Norton, Mansfield, Foxboro	Taunton Green; western end of Route 140 concurrency
Massachusetts	Bristol	Taunton	14.50	23.34			Route 140 south – New Bedford, Lakeville	Eastern end of Route 140 concurrency
Massachusetts	Bristol	Taunton	15.70	25.27			Route 104 east – Raynham, Bridgewater	
Massachusetts	Bristol	Raynham	17.10	27.52			Route 24 – Boston, Fall River	Exit 20 on Route 24
Massachusetts	Plymouth	Middleborough	21.10	33.96			I-495 to Route 24 – Wareham, Cape Cod, Marlboro, Boston	Exit 15 on I-495
Massachusetts	Plymouth	Middleborough	21.40	34.44			Route 18 / Route 28 – Lakeville, Bridgewater, Brockton	Roundabout
Massachusetts	Plymouth	Middleborough	21.40	34.44	Western end of limited-access section			
Massachusetts	Plymouth	Middleborough	25.40	40.88		–	Route 105 – Lakeville, Middleboro	At-grade intersection
Massachusetts	Plymouth	Carver	29.50	47.48		–	Route 58 – Carver, Plympton	Interchange
Massachusetts	Plymouth	Carver	31.80	51.18		–	Spring Street – Carver, Plympton	Interchange; exit is partially in Plympton
Massachusetts	Plymouth	Town of Plymouth	35.40	56.97		–	To Route 80 / Route 106 / Route 27 / Cherry Street – North Plymouth	Interchange; access via Commerce Way; to Colony Place
Massachusetts	Plymouth	Town of Plymouth	36.00	57.94	7	16	Route 3 north – Kingston, Boston	Western end of Route 3 concurrency
Massachusetts	Plymouth	Town of Plymouth	37.20	59.87	6	15	Route 3 south / Samoset Street – Bourne, Cape Cod	Eastern end of Route 3 concurrency
Massachusetts	Plymouth	Town of Plymouth	37.20	59.87	Eastern end of limited-access section			
Massachusetts	Plymouth	Plymouth Center	38.30	61.64			Route 3A (Court Street) to Route 53 – Plymouth, Kingston	Eastern terminus; To Route 53 via North in Kingston MA
1.000 mi = 1.609 km; 1.000 km = 0.621 mi: Concurrency terminus; Electronic toll collection; Incomplete access

== See also ==
- New York State Bicycle Route 44

Browse numbered routes
← NY 43	NY	→ NY 45
← Route 43	CT	→ Route 45
← Route 37	RI	→ Route 51
← Route 43	MA	→ Route 45
