= Connecticut Route 183 =

State highway in Litchfield County, Connecticut, US

Route 183
- Map of Litchfield County in northwestern Connecticut with Route 183 highlighted in red

Route information
- Maintained by CTDOT
- Length: 19.06 mi (30.67 km)
- Existed: 1932–present

Major junctions
- South end: Route 4 in Torrington
- North end: Route 183 at the Massachusetts state line near Colebrook

Location
- Country: United States
- State: Connecticut
- Counties: Litchfield

Highway system
- Connecticut State Highway System; Interstate; US; State; SSR; SR; Scenic
← Route 182	→ Route 184

Route 183 is a state highway in northwestern Connecticut, running from Torrington to the Massachusetts state line in Norfolk.

== Route description ==
Route 183 begins at the junction with Route 4 (New Harwinton Road) in the Litchfield County city of Torrington. A two-lane road through the eastern reaches of Torrington, Route 183 runs north along Torringford Street as a residential road, passing nearby Joe Ruwet Park. The route soon reaches a junction with U.S. Route 202 (US 202; named East Main Street) in the Torringford section of the city. Running northeast past Bishop Donnelly Park, the route passes the nearby middle school and enters a rural section of the town of Torrington.

Route 183 starts paralleling Route 8, a nearby freeway, which is connected via Pinewoods Road. The route runs past the Green Woods Country Club, which separates Route 183 and Route 8. Entering the town of Winchester, Route 183 winds northwest into a junction with US 44. Route 183 turns northwest onto a concurrency with US 44 and into the northern terminus of the Route 8 freeway. Now a triplex through Winchester, the routes make up the four lane South Main Street, passing through downtown.

Route 8 forks north at the junction with Park Place as part of a one-way pair. Route 183 and US 44 run westward as a four-lane street through downtown Winchester. Paralleling the nearby Mad River, the routes make a gradual turn to the northwest at the junction with Route 263 (Lake Street). After a fork with nearby Spencer Street, Route 183 and US 44 condense down to two lanes and leave downtown Winchester.

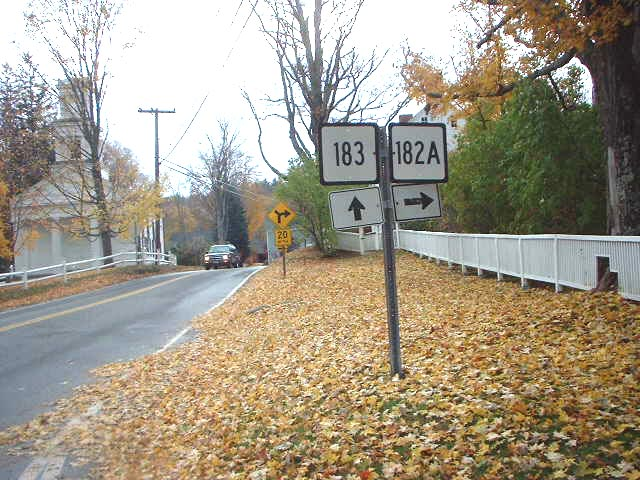
Route 183 at Route 182A in Colebrook

At the junction with Coe Street, Route 183 turns northwest onto Coe while US 44 continues west on Norfolk Road. A two-lane rural area outside of Winchester, Coe Street soon becomes Colebrook Road and meanders to the northwest on a far-distance parallel with US 44. Entering the town of Colebrook, Route 183 reaches a junction with Millbrook Road, where it turns northeast. The route passes a junction with Route 182 (Stillman Hill Road). At this junction, Route 183 becomes designated as a scenic road, reaching downtown Colebrook.

In downtown Colebrook, Route 183 turns northwest and into a junction with Route 182A (Rockwell Road). After downtown Colebrook, Route 183 runs northwest through the town of Colebrook into the hamlet of North Colebrook, where the scenic road designation ends at the junction with Church Hill Avenue. Continuing on its northwest trajectory, Route 183 ends at the Massachusetts state line, where it becomes Route 183.

== History ==
The Winsted-Colebrook route, continuing north to the Massachusetts state line, was designated in 1922 as State Highway 174. In the 1932 state highway renumbering, old Highway 174 became Route 183, running from US 44 in Winchester to the state line. In 1955, it was extended south to Torrington along former SR 710 to the current southern terminus.

== Junction list ==
The entire route is in Litchfield County.

Location	mi	km	Destinations	Notes
Torrington	0.00	0.00	Route 4 (New Harwinton Road) – Harwinton, Hartford	Southern terminus
Torrington	1.50	2.41	US 202 (East Main Street) – Torrington, Hartford	
Winchester	8.21	13.21	US 44 east (South Main Street) – Winsted, Barkhamsted, Hartford	Southern end of US 44 concurrency
Winchester	8.26	13.29	Route 8 south – Torrington, Waterbury	Southern end of Route 8 concurrency
Winchester	8.73	14.05	Route 8 north (Park Place) – Riverton	Northern end of Route 8 concurrency
Winchester	9.68	15.58	Route 263 west (Lake Street) – Winchester	Eastern terminus of Route 263
Winchester	10.35	16.66	US 44 west (Norfolk Road) – Norfolk	Northern end of US 44 concurrency
Colebrook	14.01	22.55	Route 182 west (Stillman Hill Road) / Route 182A west – Norfolk	Southern end of Route 182A concurrency; eastern terminus of Route 182
Colebrook	14.81	23.83	Route 182A west (Rockwell Road) – Norfolk	Northern end of Route 182A concurrency
Norfolk	19.06	30.67	Route 183 north (Sandy Brook Road) – Sandisfield, New Marlborough	Continuation into Massachusetts
1.000 mi = 1.609 km; 1.000 km = 0.621 mi: Concurrency terminus
