= Connecticut Route 182 =

State highway in Litchfield County, Connecticut, US

Route 182
- Map of Litchfield County in northwestern Connecticut with Route 182 highlighted in red

Route information
- Maintained by CTDOT
- Length: 3.81 mi (6.13 km)
- Existed: 1932–present

Major junctions
- West end: US 44 in Norfolk
- East end: Route 182A / Route 183 in Colebrook

Location
- Country: United States
- State: Connecticut
- Counties: Litchfield

Highway system
- Connecticut State Highway System; Interstate; US; State; SSR; SR; Scenic
← Route 181	→ Route 183

Route 182 is a rural state highway in northwestern Connecticut, running from Norfolk to Colebrook.

== Route description ==
Route 182 begins at an intersection with US 44 in the town center of Norfolk and heads east towards the town of Colebrook. It crosses into Colebrook 1.6 miles (2.6 km) later, continuing east another 2.2 miles (3.5 km) to end at an intersection with Route 183 south of Colebrook center. Route 182A is a short loop route that goes through the town center. Route 182 is known as Colebrook Road in Norfolk, and as Stillman Hill Road in Colebrook.

== History ==
In the 1920s, The Norfolk-Colebrook route was designated as a secondary state highway known as Highway 327. In 1932, old Highway 327 was renumbered to Route 182, which originally ran along the current route of Route 182A near Colebrook center. In 1940, the route was rerouted to the current location and the former alignment redesignated Route 182A.

== Junction list ==
The entire route is in Litchfield County.

Location	mi	km	Destinations	Notes
Norfolk	0.00	0.00	US 44 – Canaan, Winsted	Western terminus
Colebrook	2.81	4.52	Route 182A east – Colebrook Center	Western terminus of Route 182A
Colebrook	3.81	6.13	Route 182A / Route 183 – Winsted, Sandisfield, MA	Eastern terminus
1.000 mi = 1.609 km; 1.000 km = 0.621 mi

== Route 182A ==
Route 182A
- Location: Colebrook
- Length: 2.09 mi (3.36 km)
- Existed: 1941–present

Route 182A is a 2.09-mile (3.36 km) alternate route of Route 182 within Colebrook, including a 0.80-mile (1.29 km) unsigned section. Route 182A begins at an intersection with Route 182 in Colebrook and heads east on Rockwell Road to an intersection with Route 183. It then overlaps with Route 183 for the unsigned portion of the route, heading south-southwest to end at another intersection with Route 182. Route 182A was commissioned in approximately 1941. There have been no major changes since.
