= Newcomb–Brown Estate =

Historic house in New York, United States

- Newcomb-Brown Estate
- U.S. National Register of Historic Places
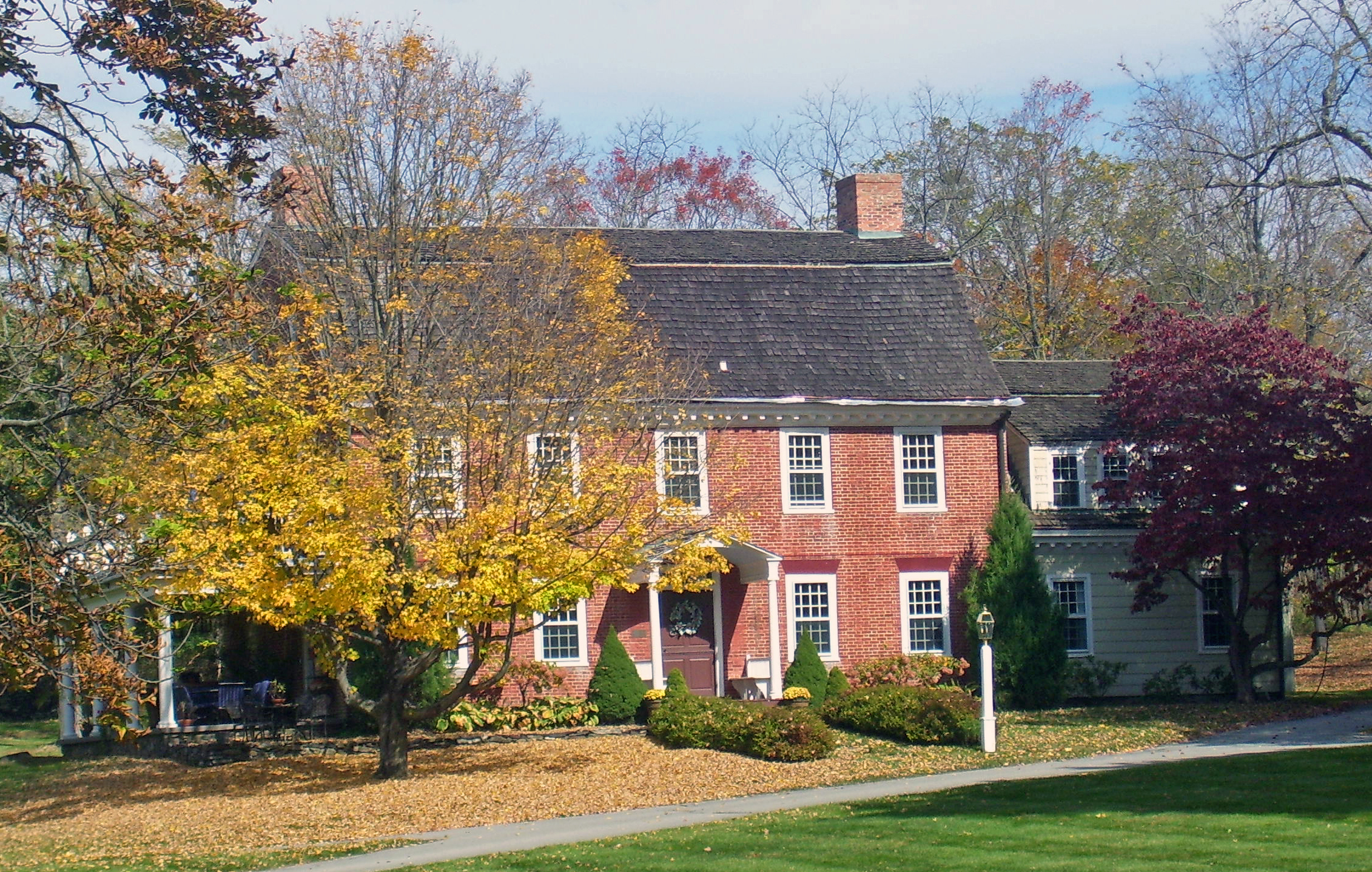
- South elevation of main house, 2008

- Location within New York Location within the United States
- Location: Pleasant Valley, NY
- Nearest city: Poughkeepsie
- Coordinates: 41°45′32″N 73°47′0″W
- Area: 33.7 acres (13.6 ha)
- Built: 1770
- Architectural style: Georgian, Dutch Colonial, Colonial Revival
- NRHP reference No.: 88001704
- Added to NRHP: October 7, 1988

The Newcomb–Brown Estate is located at the junction of the US 44 highway and Brown Road in Pleasant Valley, New York, United States. It is a brick structure built in the 18th century just before the Revolution and modified slightly by later owners but generally intact. Its basic Georgian style shows some influences of the early Dutch settlers of the region.

At the time of its construction it was the home of Zaccheus Newcomb, a local farmer who owned much of the area of Pleasant Valley now surrounding the neighborhood. Over the 19th century, much of that original landholding was subdivided and sold off as the Brown family sold it to others, including the main house. In the early 20th century, it returned to the family again when one of his descendants bought it and converted it from working farm to country house, restoring and modifying it slightly while keeping its original integrity. In 1988 it and several outbuildings from the farming era were added to the National Register of Historic Places.

== Buildings and grounds ==
The estate is a 33.7-acre (13.6 ha) parcel on the east side of US 44, divided into northern and southern sections by Brown Road. The area is rural residential, with newer houses built on large lots. Except for those portions of the lots that have been cleared, it remains mostly wooded. The estate lands are mostly level, but rise slightly at the north end, in keeping with the terrain's general regional slope up from the Hudson River to the Taconic Mountains.

Between the main house and the highway, on the house's west, is a small pond about one acre (4,000 m^{2}) in area said to have been created when the clay was dug to bake the bricks for the house. A two-acre (8,000 m^{2}) lawn is between the house and Brown Road, set off by one of many stone walls on the property. Around the house are many mature trees of species ranging from those common to the area like maple and shagbark hickory to more unusual ones like horse chestnut and ginkgo. Behind the house, on its north, is a large group of lilacs. The otherwise level ground rises slightly to the rear and is covered in second-growth woods. An old apple orchard is to its east. All of the outbuildings save one are to the northeast of the main house.

On the south side of the roughly east–west Brown Road, the property is mostly natural, with a hay field, woods, and a shallow pond straddling the property line. It is fed by a small stream that runs through it from northeast to southwest. In the northeast corner is the other outbuilding, a wagon shed.

=== Main house ===
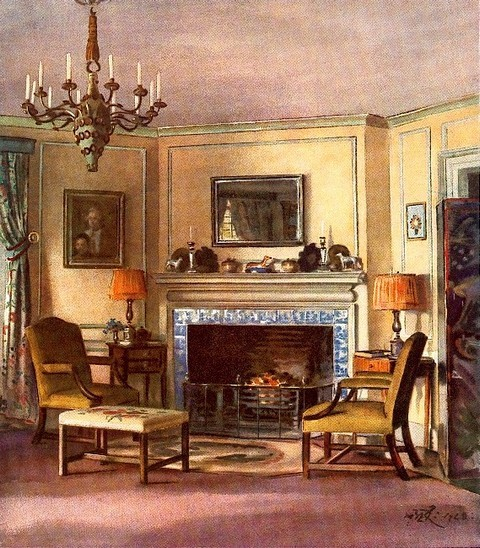
Brick House Farm (also Newcomb–Brown Estate), Pleasant Valley, Duchess County, New York, William Bruce Ellis Ranken, 1928

The main house is a two-and-a-half-story rectangular brick-faced structure on a stone basement with a gambrel roof shingled in cedar shake pierced by wide brick chimneys at either end. It has a one-and-half-story kitchen wing on its east side and a flat-roofed open porch on the west. The kitchen wing is sided in wooden shingles; its gambrel roof is pierced by a wide shed dormer window.

Its six-bay south (front) facade is laid in Flemish bond; the other three sides are done in common bond. A Dutch-style paneled door almost four feet (120 cm) wide with a six-light transom is located in the center of the ground story. It is sheltered by a small wooden portico with three stone steps leading down to a short walk to the driveway.

The first-story windows are topped with splayed wooden lintels painted dark red and incised to resemble flat brick arches. At the roofline the gambrel flares outward slightly, opening up space for a block modillioned cornice.

On the west side, the iron anchors holding the roof rafters are shaped to look like the letters Z and N, for the original owner. French doors lead on both levels to the porch and its balcony, with balustrade. All doors and windows on this elevation are topped by brick segmental arches.

The east wall anchors are the more common "S" shape, and the attic windows have been bricked in. Otherwise the treatment on that side echoes its counterpart. The north elevation (rear) is likewise similar to the front except for having fewer windows. It has a similar portico and door. A rear dormer identical to the one on the front is on the kitchen wing.

Inside, the main entrance leads to an 8-foot–wide (2.4 m) central hallway, the axis of a symmetrical floor plan. The rooms on the west are a double parlor; those on the east are the dining room and library. All have most of their original trim, including baseboards, cornices, molded chair rails and diagonally oriented corner fireplaces that share a chimney with the other room on that side. Paneled doors lead between all spaces. Flooring is random-width wide pine boards, and those in the southwest parlor are clear-grained. All first-story rooms share 9 feet (2.7 m) ceilings with the hallway. All windows have paneled shutters that recess into the 24-inch–deep (61 cm) walls with window seats below.

The front parlor fireplace, in the southwest corner, is surrounded by Bristol tiles; the others have carved wooden mantels. The dining room fireplace has a closed cupboard, and another corner has a cupboard with carved pediment, reeded pilasters and its original glass.

An open straight-run staircase rises from south to north on the east side of the central hall. It has square balusters and scroll-shaped consoles on the side of each step. Upstairs there are four bedrooms, with 8½-foot (2.6 m) ceilings and walls of the standard 18 inches (46 cm) depth. The windows have seats but no shutters. The two front bedrooms have corner fireplaces as well. A closed staircase leads to the attic, which has a pine floor but is otherwise unfinished. The roof peak is 12 feet (3.7 m) above the floor.

The kitchen wing has been modernized. Its first floor has a laundry, kitchen and half bathroom. Enclosed stairs at the north wind up to the second story, about 4½ inches (11 cm) lower than the corresponding floor in the main house. It has two small bedrooms and bathrooms.

=== Outbuildings ===
Seven support buildings, all considered contributing resources to the National Register listing, remain from the days when the estate was a much larger working farm. All but one are located to the east and northeast of the main house. The largest is a frame carriage shed, now used as a barn. It has a box stall and two straight ones. A smaller barn nearby, also of two stories, is embanked into a hillside, with ground-level entrances on both levels. Between the two are the remains of the foundation of an earlier barn.

Other buildings in that area include two chicken coops, a small shed and a frame clapboard-sided toolhouse believed to have originally been a milkhouse. Across Brown Road, on the northeast corner of the southern section of the property, is the other contributing resource, a wooden wagon shed. To its south is the remains of another old building, the foundation stones of a former smokehouse.

== History ==
Zaccheus Newcomb, born in Lebanon, Connecticut, in the mid-1720s, came west with his father Thomas to what is now Pleasant Valley in 1746 when the older man purchased the 3,000-acre (1,200 ha) Great Lot 8 of the Great Nine Partners Patent. Five years later, Thomas deeded the 200 acres (81 ha) around the current parcel to Zaccheus. He remained a farmer but was also politically active. During the Revolutionary War he served in the Continental Army, and was later a judge.

A later genealogy suggests that Newcomb's wife Sarah built the house while her husband was away at war. It is more likely that the house was built before the war, around 1770, since a Baptist Society Newcomb allowed to meet in his home was founded that year. The architect is unknown.

The basic forms of the house reflect the Newcomb family's New England origins — its Georgian plan, gambrel roof and modillioned cornice were common for large houses in the area of Connecticut the family emigrated from. But some aspects of the design, such as the flared roof, doors and generally buly massing, are more typical of houses built by Dutch settlers in the Hudson Valley. It is not known to what extent those traditions might have influenced the house's design.

Zaccheus Newcomb died in 1790, leaving portions of his landholdings, including some "Wild Lands" in the Adirondack town now known as Newcomb, and other assets to his nine children. Three more generations of Newcombs lived on the farm until 1859, when it was sold out of the family to a James Allen. He, in turn, sold it to Homer Briggs.

During this period in the late 19th century many of the extant outbuildings were erected. The original front portico, similar to the current one, was replaced by a wider Victorian porch in the 1880s. In 1912 it returned to the Newcomb family when Flora Newcomb-Brown bought it, ending its use as a working farm to make it her country house as many other wealthy residents were doing with old Dutchess County farms they bought.

She restored the original front portico, working in the newer Colonial Revival style to have a replacement of the original built. From her it went first to her brother-in-law, John Spraker, and then to his daughter, Dorothy Spraker Francke. In 1960 she subdivided the property, leaving the current parcel around the house, and sold it to James and Jane Neighbors, who modernized the interior of the kitchen wing but made very few other alterations to the house or other buildings.

== See also ==
- National Register of Historic Places listings in Dutchess County, New York
