= Norfolk (CDP), Connecticut =

Norfolk, Connecticut
- Census-designated place
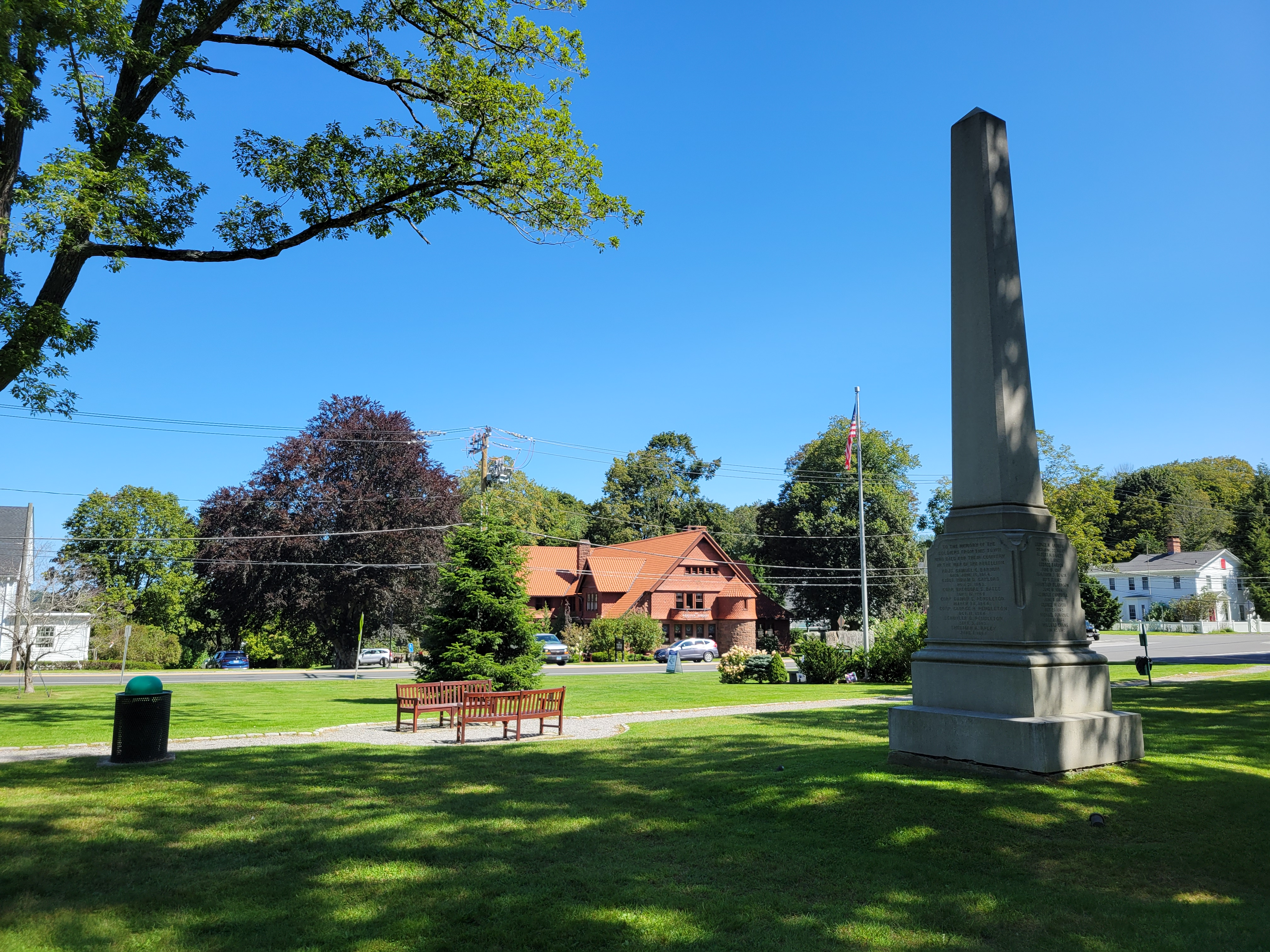
- Soldiers' Monument

- Location in Litchfield County, Connecticut
- Coordinates: 41°59′22″N 73°11′58″W
- State: Connecticut
- County: Litchfield
- Town: Norfolk

Area
  - Total: 0.93 sq mi (2.41 km^{2})
  - Land: 0.93 sq mi (2.41 km^{2})
  - Water: 0 sq mi (0.0 km^{2})
- Elevation: 1,265 ft (386 m)

Population (2010)
  - Total: 553
  - Density: 595/sq mi (229.6/km^{2})
- ZIP Code: 06058
- FIPS code: 09-54300
- GNIS feature ID: 209306

Norfolk is a census-designated place (CDP) in Litchfield County, Connecticut, United States. It is the central village within the town of Norfolk. As of the 2010 census, the population of the CDP was 553, out of 1,709 in the entire town.

== Geography ==
Norfolk is in northwestern Connecticut, in the Litchfield Hills. It includes the Norfolk Historic District, which covers the historic center of the village, but also extends west to include Old Colony Road, Blackberry Street, and Valley View Road, north to include Shepard Road, east to include Laurel Way and Beacon Lane, and south to include Highfield Road, Grant Street, and Battell Road. It is bordered to the northwest by Haystack Mountain State Park.

U.S. Route 44 passes through the center of the community, leading west 7 miles (11 km) to Canaan village and southeast 10 miles (16 km) to Winsted. Connecticut Route 272 joins US 44 through the center of Norfolk but leads south 15 miles (24 km) to Torrington and north 4 miles (6 km) to the Massachusetts border.

According to the U.S. Census Bureau, the Norfolk CDP has a total area of 0.93 square miles (2.4 km^{2}), all land. Wood Creek, Norfolk Brook, and Spaulding Brook run along the edges of the CDP, joining in the western part to form the Blackberry River, a west-flowing tributary of the Housatonic River.

== Demographics ==
As of the census of 2010, there were 553 people, 249 households, and 152 families residing in the CDP. The population density was 595 inhabitants per square mile (230/km^{2}). There were 315 housing units, of which 66, or 21.0%, were vacant. 34 of the vacant units were for seasonal or recreational use. The racial makeup of the CDP was 95.3% White, 1.8% African American, 0.4% Native American, 0.4% Asian, 0.9% some other race, and 1.3% from two or more races. Hispanic or Latino of any race were 0.9% of the population.

Of the 249 households in the community, 25.3% had children under the age of 18 living with them, 46.6% were headed by married couples living together, 10.4% had a female householder with no husband present, and 39.0% were non-families. 32.1% of all households were made up of individuals, and 18.1% were someone living alone who was 65 years of age or older. The average household size was 2.21, and the average family size was 2.72.

19.5% of the CDP population were under the age of 18, 7.9% were from 18 to 24, 14.6% were from 25 to 44, 35.4% were from 45 to 64, and 22.6% were 65 years of age or older. The median age was 49.8 years. For every 100 females, there were 90.0 males. For every 100 females age 18 and over, there were 90.2 males.

For the period 2013–17, the estimated median income for a household in the CDP was $58,125, and the median income for a family was $85,000. The per capita income for the CDP was $41,262. 0% of families and 6.6% of the total population were living below the poverty line, including 0% of people under 18 and 15.9% of those over 64.

== Education ==
It is in the Norfolk School District.
