= Oliver Mill Park =

- Muttock Historic and Archeological District
- U.S. National Register of Historic Places
- U.S. Historic district
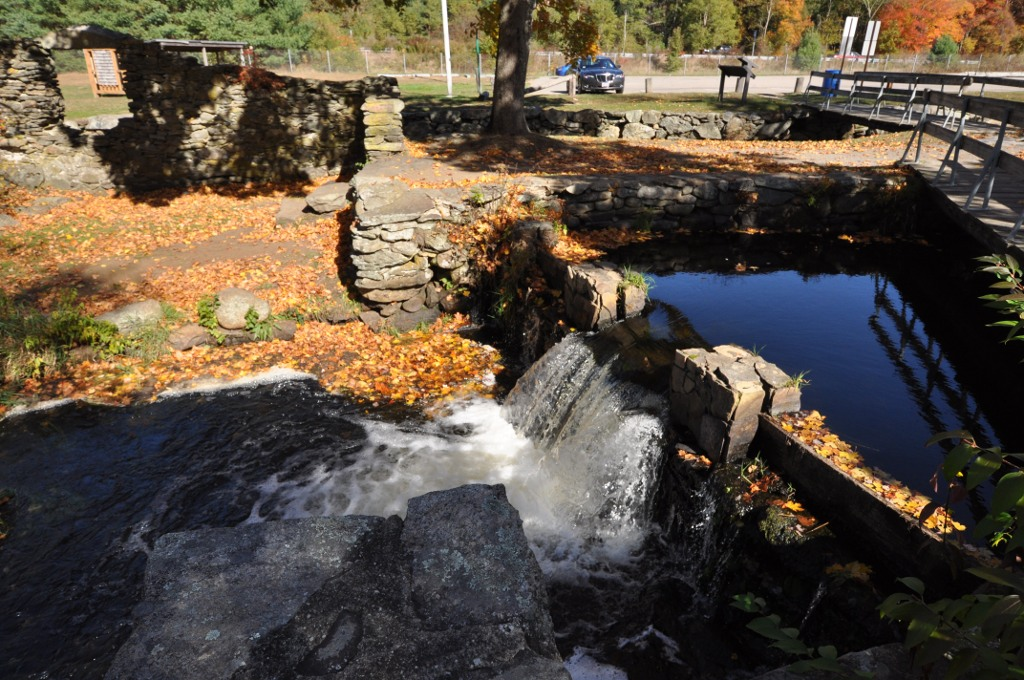
- Nearest city: Middleborough, Massachusetts
- Built: 1736
- Architectural style: Georgian, Federal
- NRHP reference No.: 00000504
- Added to NRHP: May 18, 2000

Oliver Mill Park is a municipal park on Nemasket Street in Middleborough, Massachusetts. It contains the remains of a major 18th century industrial complex developed by Peter Oliver, which included several mills, a blast furnace, and forge. It was listed on the National Register of Historic Places in 2000 as the Muttock Historic and Archeological District.

Located along the banks of the Nemasket River, the area was originally used by Native Americans, who had established fishing weirs at the site to harvest the high quantities of alewife and blueback herring that migrate up the river every spring. In 1734, the first mill was built at the site, and in 1744 it was purchased and its enlargement begun by Peter Oliver. At its height, the complex Oliver built was one of the largest villages in the area, manufacturing cannonballs and cannons of various sizes, as well as more prosaic household goods. In the 19th century it was used in the manufacture of shovels, but it closed in 1843 and was abandoned.

A fish ladder was installed at the park in 1982, aiding in the migration of river herring up the Nemasket.

== See also ==
- National Register of Historic Places listings in Plymouth County, Massachusetts
