= Solomon Rockwell House =

Historic house in Connecticut, United States

- U.S. National Register of Historic Places
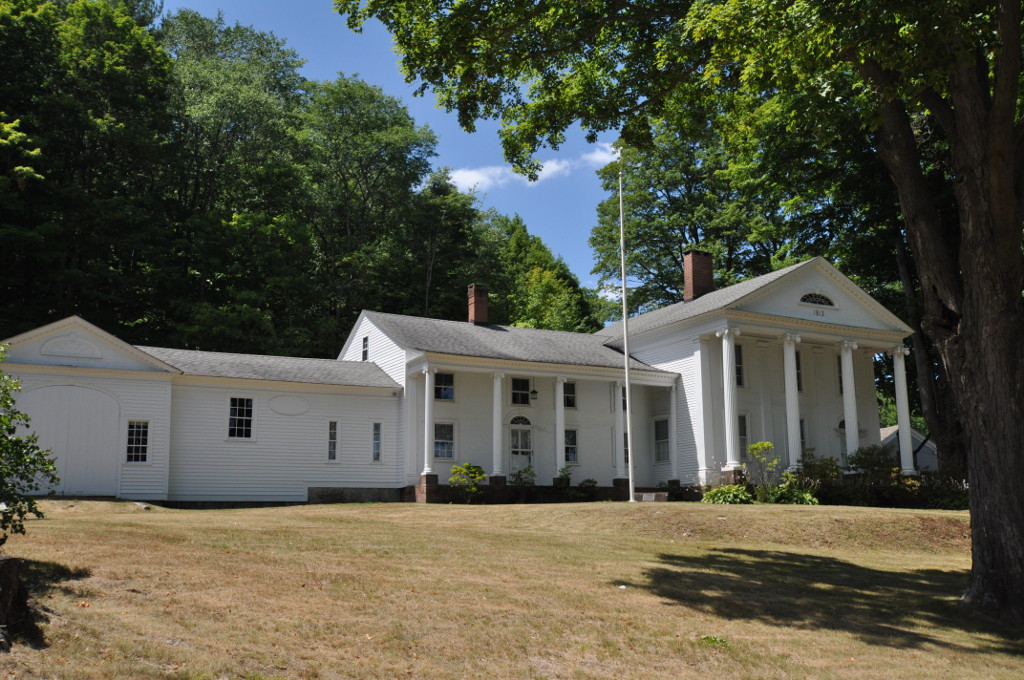

- Location within Connecticut Location within the United States
- Location: 226 Prospect Street, Winsted, Connecticut
- Coordinates: 41°55′26″N 73°4′44″W
- Area: 3 acres (1.2 ha)
- Built: 1813
- Architect: Swift, William
- Architectural style: Federal, Adamesque
- NRHP reference No.: 77001500
- Added to NRHP: July 15, 1977

The Solomon Rockwell House is a historic house museum at 226 Prospect Street in the Winsted area of Winchester, Connecticut, United States. The main portion of the house, built about 1813, is a particularly fine example of Greek Revival architecture. The house is owned by the Winchester Historical Society, and has displays of 19th-century artifacts relating to local manufacturing business and the American Civil War, and it also hosts the local fire museum. It is open by appointment.

== Description and history ==
The Solomon Rockwell House is located northwest of downtown Winsted, at the southwest corner of Lake and Prospect Streets, on a rise overlooking the Mad River. The main house is a 2 1/2-story wood-frame structure, with a front-facing gabled roof and clapboarded exterior. A series of ells extend to its left side, ending in a small carriage barn. One of these ells is an older house, built in the mid-18th century. The main block is distinguished by a Greek Revival temple portico with two-story columns.

The house achieved much of its present appearance in 1813, when the main block and carriage barn were built. This design was the work of William Swift, an early Connecticut architect. Solomon Rockwell, for whom it was built, owned two iron forges in town. The house passed to the historical society in the 1920s, and has served as a museum since then.

== See also ==
- National Register of Historic Places listings in Litchfield County, Connecticut
