= Connecticut Route 272 =

State highway in Litchfield County, Connecticut, US

Route 272
- Map of Litchfield County in northwestern Connecticut with Route 272 highlighted in red

Route information
- Maintained by CTDOT
- Length: 17.96 mi (28.90 km)
- Existed: 1963–present

Major junctions
- South end: Route 4 in Torrington
- US 44 in Norfolk
- North end: Norfolk Road at the Massachusetts state line in Norfolk

Location
- Country: United States
- State: Connecticut
- Counties: Litchfield

Highway system
- Connecticut State Highway System; Interstate; US; State; SSR; SR; Scenic
← Route 263	→ Route 275

Route 272 is a state highway in northwestern Connecticut running from Torrington to the Massachusetts state-board in Norfolk.

== Route description ==
Route 272 begins at an intersection with Route 4 in West Torrington and heads northwest along the West Branch Naugatuck River and Hall Meadow Brook to Goshen. In Goshen, it continues northwest along Hall Meadow Brook past Hall Meadow State Park and across the northeastern corner of the town to Norfolk. In Norfolk, it heads northwest through South Norfolk, the north past Dennis Hill State Park. It briefly overlaps US 44 in the center of Norfolk, then heads north past Haystack Mountain State Park and finally turns northwest past Campbell Falls State Park at the Massachusetts state line. It continues in Massachusetts as Norfolk Road.

The section of Route 272 in Norfolk is designated a scenic road.

== History ==
The road between Torrington and Norfolk was originally designated as a secondary state highway in 1922, known as Highway 312. In the 1932 state highway renumbering, old Highway 312 was renumbered to Route 49. On May 1, 1954, Route 72 was extended north from Bristol all the way to Norfolk and incorporated the entirety of Route 49. In 1963, Route 72 was cut back to end at Route 4 in Harwinton (its modern end). The former portion north of Route 4 was renumbered to Route 272. The route has had no significant changes since.

== Junction list ==
The entire route is in Litchfield County.

Location	mi	km	Destinations	Notes
Torrington	0.00	0.00	Route 4 – Goshen, Torrington	Southern terminus
Goshen	6.02	9.69	Route 263 east – Winsted	Western terminus of Route 263
Norfolk	13.41	21.58	US 44 east – Winsted, Hartford	Southern end of US 44 concurrency
Norfolk	13.75	22.13	US 44 west – Lakeville	Northern end of US 44 concurrency
Norfolk	17.96	28.90	Norfolk Road – Southfield	Continuation into Massachusetts
1.000 mi = 1.609 km; 1.000 km = 0.621 mi
