= Colebrook, Connecticut =

- Town
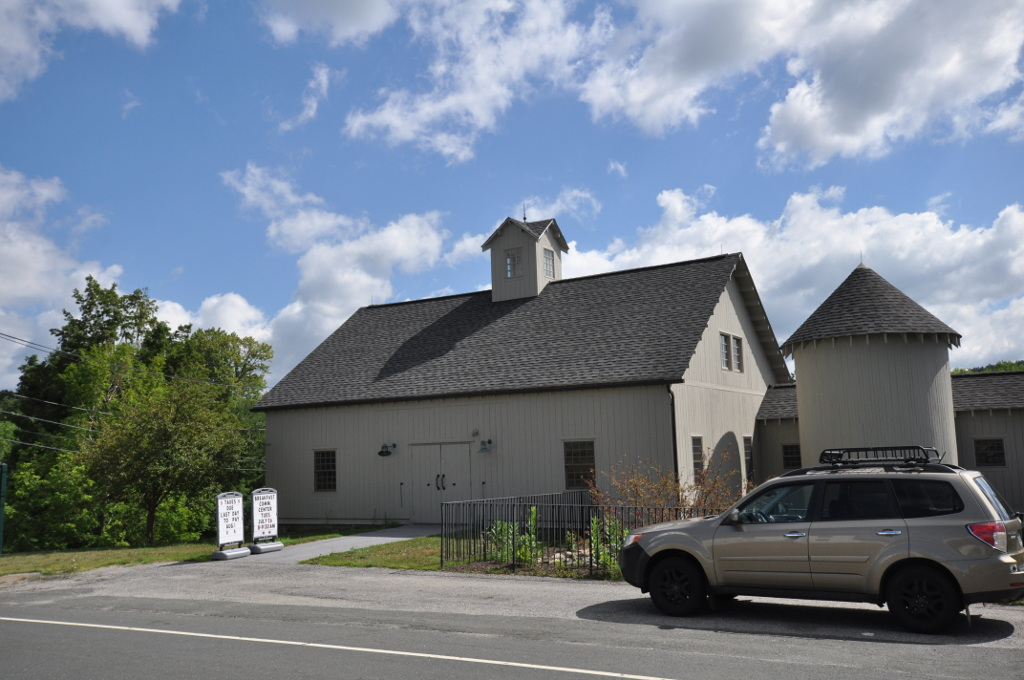
- Colebrook town hall

- Seal
- Interactive map of Colebrook, Connecticut
- Coordinates: 42°00′05″N 73°05′04″W
- Country: United States
- U.S. state: Connecticut
- County: Litchfield
- Region: Northwest Hills
- Incorporated: 1779

Government
  - Type: Selectman-town meeting
  - First selectman: Brad Bremer (D)
  - Selectman: Aden J. Ruwet (R)
  - Selectman: Alyssa Correll (D)

Area
  - Total: 32.9 sq mi (85.3 km^{2})
  - Land: 31.5 sq mi (81.7 km^{2})
  - Water: 1.4 sq mi (3.6 km^{2})
- Elevation: 961 ft (293 m)

Population (2020)
  - Total: 1,361
  - Density: 43.1/sq mi (16.7/km^{2})
- Time zone: UTC-5 (Eastern)
  - Summer (DST): UTC-4 (Eastern)
- ZIP code: 06021
- Area codes: 860/959
- FIPS code: 09-16050
- GNIS feature ID: 0213410
- Website: www.townofcolebrook.org

Colebrook is a town in Litchfield County, Connecticut, United States. The population was 1,361 at the 2020 census. The town is part of the Northwest Hills Planning Region. Colebrook was named after Colebrooke in the English county of Devon; the reason is now unknown.

== Geography ==
Colebrook is in northeastern Litchfield County and is bounded to the east by Hartford County, Connecticut, and to the north by Berkshire and Hampden County in Massachusetts. According to the United States Census Bureau, the town has a total area of 32.9 square miles (85.3 km^{2}), of which 31.5 square miles (81.7 km^{2}) are land and 1.4 square miles (3.6 km^{2}), or 4.23%, are water. Colebrook River Lake and West Branch Reservoir, both on the West Branch of the Farmington River, are in the northeastern part of the town. The Algonquin State Forest is in the central part of the town.

Colebrook is 15 miles (24 km) north of Torrington and 30 miles (48 km) northwest of Hartford, the state capitol.

=== Principal communities ===
- Colebrook center
- North Colebrook
- Robertsville

== Demographics ==
Historical population
Census	Pop.	Note	%±
1820	1,274		—
1850	1,317		—
1860	1,375		4.4%
1870	1,141		−17.0%
1880	1,148		0.6%
1890	1,098		−4.4%
1900	684		−37.7%
1910	557		−18.6%
1920	492		−11.7%
1930	564		14.6%
1940	547		−3.0%
1950	592		8.2%
1960	791		33.6%
1970	1,020		29.0%
1980	1,221		19.7%
1990	1,365		11.8%
2000	1,471		7.8%
2010	1,485		1.0%
2020	1,361		−8.4%
U.S. Decennial Census

As of the census of 2000, there were 1,471 people, 566 households, and 419 families residing in the town. The population density was 46.7 inhabitants per square mile (18.0/km^{2}). There were 656 housing units at an average density of 20.8 per square mile (8.0/km^{2}). The racial makeup of the town was 97.01% White, 0.68% African American, 0.61% Asian, 0.88% from other races, and 0.82% from two or more races. Hispanic or Latino of any race were 2.45% of the population.

There were 566 households, out of which 32.2% had children under the age of 18 living with them, 65.2% were married couples living together, 5.1% had a female householder with no husband present, and 25.8% were non-families. 19.6% of all households were made up of individuals, and 7.1% had someone living alone who was 65 years of age or older. The average household size was 2.60 and the average family size was 3.01.

In the town, the population was spread out, with 24.5% under the age of 18, 4.2% from 18 to 24, 29.6% from 25 to 44, 27.5% from 45 to 64, and 14.1% who were 65 years of age or older. The median age was 41 years. For every 100 females, there were 102.1 males. For every 100 females age 18 and over, there were 101.5 males.

The median income for a household in the town was $58,684, and the median income for a family was $64,286. Males had a median income of $42,647 versus $35,987 for females. The per capita income for the town was $29,789. About 1.4% of families and 2.6% of the population were below the poverty line, including none of those under age 18 and 9.0% of those age 65 or over.

Voter registration and party enrollment as of October 31, 2023
Party	Active voters	Inactive voters	Total voters	Percentage
Democratic	285	12	297	25.87%
Republican	329	21	350	30.49%
Unaffiliated	453	30	483	42.07%
Minor Parties	17	2	19	1.66%
Total	1,084	64	1,148	100%

Presidential Election Results
Year	Democratic	Republican	Third Parties
2020	40.8% 403	57.0% 563	2.2% 22
2016	36.1% 324	58.8% 528	5.1% 46
2012	44.4% 380	53.9% 462	1.7% 14
2008	50.8% 460	46.5% 421	2.7% 24
2004	49.9% 458	46.8% 429	3.3% 30
2000	45.6% 374	45.5% 373	8.9% 73
1996	46.7% 345	37.2% 275	16.1% 119
1992	44.4% 379	30.4% 259	25.2% 215
1988	50.9% 376	47.9% 354	1.2% 9
1984	33.3% 241	66.4% 480	0.3% 2
1980	33.6% 243	49.1% 355	17.3%125
1976	42.4% 274	57.1% 369	0.5% 3
1972	35.8% 211	62.1% 366	2.1% 12
1968	37.8% 195	56.4% 291	5.8% 30
1964	63.7% 295	36.3% 198	0.00% 0
1960	32.1% 151	67.9% 319	0.00% 0
1956	20.6% 90	79.4% 346	0.00% 0

== Transportation ==
The town is served by Connecticut Routes 8, 182, and 183. Route 8 leads south 5 miles (8 km) to Winsted and north 7 miles (11 km) to Sandisfield, Massachusetts. Route 182 leads west 4 miles (6 km) to U.S. Route 44 in Norfolk, while Route 183 leads south 6 miles (10 km) to Winsted and northwest 12 miles (19 km) to New Marlborough, Massachusetts.

== Education ==
It is in the zone for Northwestern Regional School District No. 7: Northwestern Regional Middle School and Northwestern Regional High School.

== Notable locations ==
- Rock Hall, a building designed by architect Addison Mizner, listed on the National Register of Historic Places.

== Wind farm siting ==
Wind Colebrook was a proposal to build the state's first utility scale wind turbine project, for which permitting was ultimately denied.

BNE Energy was cleared to build three wind turbines in Colebrook and two 2.85MW, 100m-diameter turbines were installed in 2015. A third (3.8MW, 130m rotor diameter) turbine is planned for installation by 2021. According to BNE Energy's quarterly generation reports to PURA, the Colebrook wind farm has slightly exceeded the planned level of energy generation, with 12,742MWh generated in 2016 and 12,706MWh generated in 2017. The wind farm, according to these figures, is operating at about 30 percent of its rated capacity.

== Notable people ==
- Roy Chapman Andrews, claimed to be one of the inspirations for the movie character Indiana Jones.
- Rufus Babcock, second president of Colby College; born in North Colebrook
- Donald Barr (1921–2004), novelist, educator, and book reviewer for The New York Times; retired to Colebrook in the 1980s
- Abiram Chamberlain (1837–1911), the 60th governor of Connecticut; born in Colebrook
- Jonathan Edwards (the younger) (1745–1801), theologian; lived and preached in Colebrook for four years
- Eric Foner (born 1943), Columbia University professor, author, and noted Civil War historian
- Hiram Griswold (1807–1881), member of the Ohio Senate and defense lawyer of John Brown
- William H. McNeill (1917-2016), University of Chicago professor, chair of history department, author of Plagues and Peoples; died in Colebrook
- Harris Merton Lyon, short story writer; lived in North Colebrook
- Christine Negroni (1956- ), noted aviation and travel writer; part-time resident of the town
- James Phelps (1822–1900), judge, Connecticut state legislator and US congressman; born in Colebrook
- Lancelot Phelps (1784–1866), congressman and father to James Phelps
- Ammi Phillips (1788–1865), artist; born in Colebrook
- Thomas Robbins (1777–1856), Congregational minister, bibliophile, and antiquarian; died in Colebrook
- Julius Rockwell (1805–1888), judge and congressman from Massachusetts; born in Colebrook
