= Connecticut Turnpike =

Freeway in the northeast US

Gov. John Davis Lodge Turnpike
- Connecticut Turnpike
- Connecticut Turnpike highlighted in green

Route information
- Maintained by CTDOT
- Length: 128.47 mi (206.75 km)
- Existed: January 2, 1958–present
- Component highways: I-95 from New York state line to East Lyme; I-395 from East Lyme to Plainfield; SR 695 (unsigned) from Plainfield to Killingly

Major junctions
- South end: I-95 at the New York state line
- US 7 in Norwalk; Route 25 / Route 8 in Bridgeport; Milford Parkway in Milford; I-91 in New Haven; Route 9 in Old Saybrook; I-95 in East Lyme; Route 2A in Montville; Route 2 / Route 32 in Norwich; I-395 in Plainfield
- North end: US 6 in Killingly

Location
- Country: United States
- State: Connecticut
- Counties: Fairfield, New Haven, Middlesex, New London, Windham

Highway system
- Connecticut State Highway System; Interstate; US; State; SSR; SR; Scenic

The Connecticut Turnpike (officially the Governor John Davis Lodge Turnpike) is a freeway and former toll road in the U.S. state of Connecticut; it is maintained by the Connecticut Department of Transportation (CTDOT). Spanning approximately 128 miles (206 km) along a generally west–east axis, its routing is shared with Interstate 95 (I-95) for 88 miles (142 km) from the New York state border in Greenwich to East Lyme; I-395 for 36 miles (58 km) from East Lyme to Plainfield; and SR 695 for four miles (6.4 km) from Plainfield to the Rhode Island state line at U.S. Route 6 (US 6) in Killingly. The turnpike briefly runs concurrently with US 1 from Old Saybrook to Old Lyme and Route 2A from Montville to Norwich.

Construction on the Connecticut Turnpike began in 1954 and the highway was opened in 1958, predating designation as part of the Interstate system. It originally followed a sequential exit numbering system for its enter length from Greenwich to Killingly that disregarded subsequent route transitions. I-95 used the Connecticut Turnpike exit numbers from Greenwich to East Lyme, while I-395 followed the turnpike exit numbers north to turnpike's split toward Killingly, and continued the numbering sequence to the Massachusetts state line. In East Lyme, there is a gap in the I-95 numbering to avoid duplicate exit numbers with I-395 in the same town. In 2015, the I-395 exit numbers were changed to a mileage-based system reflecting their distance from the split from I-95, effectively removing the defining element of the turnpike.

In some sections southwest of New Haven, the I-95/Connecticut Turnpike concurrency carries an annual average daily traffic of over 150,000 vehicles. The highway is generally three lanes from the New York stateline to Branford, CT, transitioning to mostly two lanes east of Branford along both I-95 and I-395.

== Route description ==
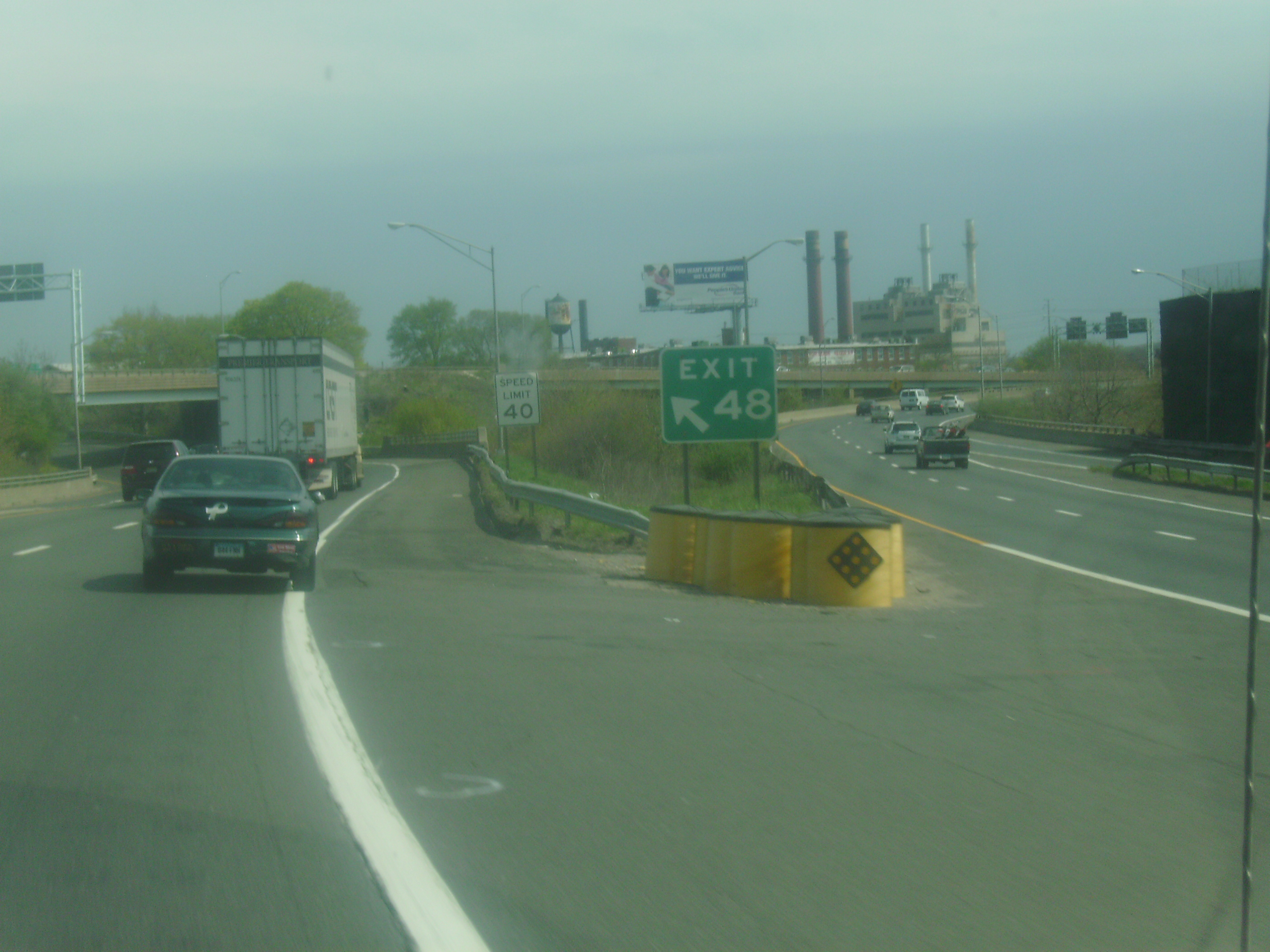
Northbound exit 48 offramp from the I-95 section, before the reconstruction of the I-95/I-91 interchange

=== I-95 ===
I-95 enters Connecticut as the Connecticut Turnpike in Greenwich at the New York state line. The turnpike stretches for 128.5 miles (206.8 km) across the state, but only the first 88 miles (142 km) is signed as I-95. This portion of the highway passes through the most heavily urbanized section of Connecticut along the shoreline between Greenwich and New Haven, going through the cities of Stamford, Norwalk, Bridgeport, and New Haven, with daily traffic volumes of 120,000 to over 150,000 throughout the entire 48-mile (77 km) length between the New York border and the junction with I-91 in New Haven. The turnpike intersects with several major expressways, namely US 7 in Norwalk, Route 8 at in Bridgeport, the Merritt and Wilbur Cross parkways (via the Milford Parkway) in Milford, and I-91 in New Haven.

North (east) of I-91, the turnpike continues along the Connecticut shoreline, usually with less traffic. The six-lane highway is reduced to four lanes in Branford, interchanges with Route 9 in Old Saybrook, crosses the Connecticut River on the Raymond E. Baldwin Bridge and continues until the interchange with I-395 near the East Lyme–Waterford town line.

=== I-395 ===
The turnpike leaves I-95 at exit 76 in East Lyme, continuing on as I-395 north heading towards Norwich, Jewett City and Plainfield until exit 35, where the turnpike and I-395 split. I-395 continues north towards Worcester, Massachusetts, ending at I-290 and the Massachusetts Turnpike. The Connecticut Turnpike officially ends at US 6 (Danielson Pike) in Killingly, which continues on towards Providence, Rhode Island. Unlike the I-95 portion, the I-395 portion of the turnpike has changed very little over the years, retaining its grass median with a guardrail separating directions of travel.

=== SR 695 ===
SR 695 is the 4.49-mile (7.23 km) unsigned portion of the turnpike from I-395 in Plainfield to US 6 at the Rhode Island state line in Killingly. The road is not signed as SR 695 but eastbound as "To US 6 East" and westbound as "To I-395 South". SR 695 would have become part of the now-defunct alignment of the I-84 freeway between Hartford, Connecticut, and Providence, Rhode Island, had that freeway been built. (Present-day I-84 continues eastbound from Hartford into Massachusetts where it ends at I-90, the Massachusetts Turnpike). There are two partial exits on SR 695. Westbound exit 1 (formerly exit 90) at Squaw Rock Road is only accessible westbound. The easternmost exit (also numbered exit 1, but formerly unnumbered), located 1,500 feet (460 m) east of the Squaw Rock Road onramp and accessible only eastbound, is for Ross Road, and the only onramp provided from Ross Road is for SR 695 westbound. The interchange with I-395 is only partial: there is no access provided from SR 695 westbound to I-395 northbound and no access from I-395 southbound to SR 695 eastbound.

== History ==
The general route and construction of the turnpike were both mandated by state law. Intended to relieve congestion on US 1 and Route 15 (the Merritt and Wilbur Cross parkways), design work began in 1954. The Connecticut Turnpike opened to traffic on January 2, 1958, at 2:30 p.m. However, the westernmost portion of the highway (the three miles [4.8 km] connecting Greenwich with the New England Thruway) opened 10 months later. Tolls were originally collected through a series of eight toll booths along the route.

The Connecticut Turnpike was designed and built much differently than other toll roads built around the same time. Unlike toll roads in other states that operated under semi-autonomous, quasi-public toll road authorities, the Connecticut Turnpike was operated by the Connecticut Highway Department (later the Connecticut Department of Transportation) from its inception. Additionally, unlike toll roads in other states where revenues collected from motorists were legally required to be kept within the toll road authority and used to finance the facility's construction and upkeep, toll revenues from the Connecticut Turnpike were placed into the state's general fund and used for highway and non-highway expenditures alike. Finally, the closely spaced interchanges and eight mainline barriers were a result of each town through which the Connecticut Turnpike passed being guaranteed a certain number of access points to gain the support of each affected town for construction of the highway. This is in contrast to toll roads built in neighboring states with widely spaced interchanges that normally featured a ticket system where one obtained a ticket at entering the toll road, then paid a distance-based fare upon exiting.

The turnpike was renamed after former Connecticut Governor John Davis Lodge on December 31, 1985, two months after the tolls were removed. Local legend is the initial phase of turnpike construction in 1954 was so disruptive in heavily Republican Fairfield County that local voters there turned on incumbent Republican Governor Lodge, leading to his defeat by Abraham Ribicoff.

Initially, the Connecticut Turnpike was signed as an east–west route, even after the I-95 designation was added to the turnpike between Greenwich and Waterford in the early 1960s. Signs indicating I-95/Connecticut Turnpike as an east–west route existed in places until the early 1990s, when the remaining east–west signage was replaced by north–south signage.

From Waterford to Killingly, the turnpike was initially designated as Route 52 in 1967, following the opening of the toll-free section of Route 52 from Killingly to the Massachusetts border. To accommodate the truncation of the Hartford to Providence extension of I-84 to Killingly, following Rhode Island's cancellation of its portion of that extension in the early 1980s, Route 52 was to be re-designated as an Interstate. Initially, Connecticut and Massachusetts requested that the American Association of State Highway and Transportation Officials (AASHTO) extend the I-290 designation southward along free Route 52 and the Connecticut Turnpike to I-95 in Waterford. AASHTO rejected the I-290 request and instead approved the I-395 designation in 1983.

=== Accidents ===
Several notorious accidents have occurred throughout the turnpike's history. The worst of these was a serious incident on January 19, 1983, in which a tractor trailer after a brake failure collided with four cars at the Stratford toll plaza, killing seven people and injuring several others. The investigation following the crash determined that the truck driver fell asleep at the wheel just before the crash took place. At the time, the government of Connecticut was removing tolls along the turnpike; as a result of the incident, the government expedited the removal of the remaining tollbooths.

In June 1983, a section of the turnpike's northbound Mianus River Bridge in Greenwich collapsed due to corrosion of its substructure, killing three motorists crossing it at the time.

On March 25, 2004, a tanker truck carrying fuel swerved to avoid a car that cut the truck off and subsequently overturned, dumping 8,000 US gallons (30,000 L) of home heating oil onto the Howard Avenue overpass in Bridgeport. Passing vehicles kicked up the oil which ignited a towering inferno that subsequently melted the bridge structure and caused the southbound lanes to sag several feet. The northbound lanes, which received less damage from the fire, were opened five days later after being reinforced with temporary scaffolding. The southbound lanes opened on April 1, after a temporary bridge was erected.

=== Stalling of upgrades by budget deficits and lawsuits ===
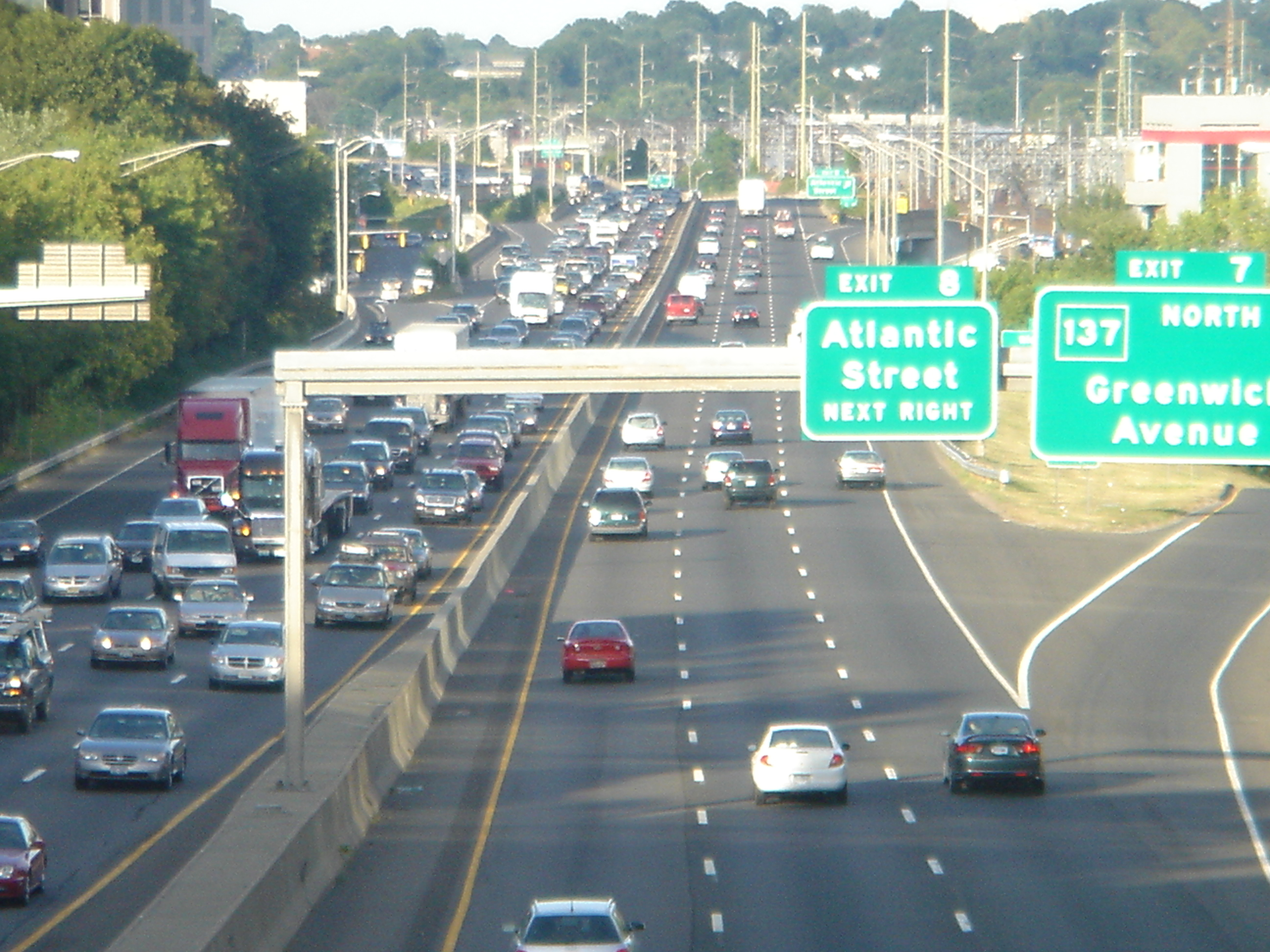
Northbound I-95 in Stamford

The Connecticut Turnpike opened southwest Connecticut to a mass migration of New Yorkers, leading to substantial residential and economic growth in Fairfield and New Haven counties. The turnpike became a primary commuter route to New York City. With additional segments of I-95 that opened in the 1960s connecting to Providence and Boston, the turnpike became an essential route for transporting people and goods throughout the Northeast. As a result, much of the turnpike had become functionally obsolete by 1965, with traffic exceeding its design capacity. Originally designed to carry 60,000 vehicles per day (VPD) on the four-lane sections and 90,000 VPD on the six-lane portion west of New Haven, the turnpike carried 75,000–100,000 VPD east of New Haven, and 130,000–200,000 VPD between New Haven and the New York state line as of 2006.

There were dozens of plans discussed to alleviate traffic congestion and improve safety on the turnpike over the past half-century, but most of these plans languished amid political infighting and lawsuits brought on by special-interest groups. Still, traffic and deadly accidents continued to increase each year on the turnpike, and by the 1990s the Connecticut Turnpike had started to become known as "the Highway of Death".

Furthermore, while most of the turnpike is signed as I-95 or I-395, the highway was designed and built before the Interstate Highway System was established. As a result, much of the turnpike does not meet Interstate standards, particularly with overpasses ranging from 13.5 to 15 feet (4.1 to 4.6 m); Interstate Highway standards require a minimum of 16 feet [4.9 m] of vertical clearance. Interchanges are too closely spaced; ramps and acceleration-deceleration lanes need to be lengthened. In some areas, median and shoulder widths and curve radii also fall short of Interstate standards.

Complicating efforts to upgrade the turnpike to Interstate standards is that engineers did not acquire enough right-of-way to accommodate future expansion when the Connecticut Turnpike was built during the late 1950s, which means adjacent land must be seized to upgrade the turnpike, resulting in lengthy and costly eminent domain battles between the State of Connecticut and landowners refusing to give up their property. Additionally the turnpike passes through areas with some of the highest property values in the country, making land acquisition for expanding the highway extremely expensive. Finally, the turnpike was built through environmentally sensitive ecosystems and wetlands associated with Long Island Sound, meaning most expansion projects require lengthy environmental impact studies that are able to withstand constant litigation by environmental groups. Air pollution laws also cause conflict, since Connecticut is grouped into the federal statistical areas around New York City and it suffers from consequences and special regulations applied to non-compliant air quality areas. An example of this is that it is easier to lengthen an entrance or exit ramp than to add a full lane, since adding any capacity to a road, by definition, will increase the pollution created by the road, further violating federal air quality standards. In 2000, one CTDOT official commented during a public meeting on expanding I-84 (an Interstate that parallels I-95 about 20 miles [32 km] further inland), "If we had tried to build I-95 today, it would be impossible because of the sensitive ecosystems it passes through. It would never get approved."

=== Bridge collapse jumpstarts turnpike upgrades ===
A comprehensive plan to address safety and capacity issues on the Connecticut Turnpike did not progress beyond the initial planning stages until the collapse of the Mianus River Bridge on June 28, 1983. Following the collapse, Governor William A. O'Neill initiated an $8 billion program to rehabilitate Connecticut's highways. Included in this program was the inspection and repair of the turnpike's nearly 300 bridges and overpasses. Furthermore, O'Neill directed ConnDOT to develop a viable plan for addressing safety and congestion on the state's roads.

=== High-priority status ===
Throughout the late 1980s and early 1990s, CTDOT developed a comprehensive plan to improve the turnpike through Fairfield and New Haven counties. In 1993 CTDOT embarked on a 25-year multibillion-dollar program to upgrade the Connecticut Turnpike from the Connecticut River at Old Saybrook to the New York state line at Greenwich. The program included the complete reconstruction of several turnpike segments, including replacing bridges, adding travel lanes, reconfiguring interchanges, upgrading lighting and signage, and implementing the intelligent transportation system with traffic cameras, a variety of embedded roadway sensors, and variable-message signs. Since the start of the program, a six-mile (9.7 km) section through Bridgeport was completely rebuilt to Interstate standards. In 2015, a long-term $2 billion program was completed, to rebuild 12 miles (19 km) of turnpike between West Haven and Branford, including a new extradosed Pearl Harbor Memorial Bridge over the Quinnipiac River and New Haven Harbor.

Plans to upgrade the turnpike received a boost in 2005 when federal legislation known as SAFETEA-LU designated the I-95 portion of the Connecticut Turnpike from the New York state line to Waterford as High Priority Corridor 65. Corridor 65 also includes the 24-mile (39 km) section of I-95 from Waterford to the Rhode Island state line that was built in 1964, which is not part of the Turnpike.

=== Plans for the I-395/SR 695 section ===
Traffic is relatively light on the rural I-395 section and the northeast leg (SR 695) in Killingly; this section is largely unchanged from its original 1958 profile. The only two major projects completed on this section since were the 2015 renumbering of exits based on I-395 mileposts (exit 77 became exit 2, up to exit 90 which became exit 35) and the reconstruction of the northbound on and off ramps at exit 11 (old exit 80) in Norwich, completed in 2009.

=== Improvement projects ===
- Raymond E. Baldwin Bridge replacement (Connecticut River), Old Saybrook (to Old Lyme): $460 million, completed in 1994
- Saugatuck River Bridge replacement, Westport: $65 million, completed in 1996
- Lake Saltonstall Bridge Widening, East Haven: $50 million, completed in 1997
- Widening and reconstruction exits 8-10, Stamford: $80 million, completed in 2000
- Reconstruction of exit 40, Milford: $30 million, completed in 2002
- Reconstruction of exit 41, Orange: $60 million, completed in 2000
- Reconstruction/widening exits 23-30, Bridgeport: $570 million, completed in 2006 (two years behind schedule and $170 million over budget) (NOTE 2)
- Widening between exits 51 to 54, East Haven–Branford: $86 million, completed in 2006
- Reconfigure northbound ramps at exit 80, Norwich: $8 million, started in April 2009, completed in November 2009.
- Widening between exits 51 and 49 (NOTE 1), East Haven–New Haven: $70 million, started in 2005, completed in 2008
- Pearl Harbor Memorial Bridge replacement, New Haven: $490 million, started in 2008, completed in 2015 (NOTE 3)
- I-91/Route 34 interchange reconstruction, New Haven: $270 million, initial phases started in 2004, completed in 2016
- Exit 42 reconstruction, West Haven: $36 million, started in 2003, completed in 2007
- Housatonic River Bridge replacement, Milford–Stratford: $300 million, work started in September 2009, completed in 2016
- West River Bridge replacement and widening (including reconstructing exit 44 and removing exit 45), New Haven: $200 million; construction began in 2014, completed in 2018
- Widening between exits 10 and 13, Darien: $35 million, started in 2008, completed in 2010
- Widening between exits 14 and 15, Norwalk: $50 million, started in 2013, completed in 2015
- Widening and reconstruction between exits 45 and 47 (Long Wharf Section), New Haven: $200–500 million, started in 2009, completed in 2013
- Add a travel lane in each direction from Branford to Waterford: $1.0 billion
- Reconstruction and widening exits 6-8, Stamford: Cost TBD, expected start TBD, expected completion TBD.
- Add a travel lane in each direction from New York state Line to Bridgeport: Cost TBD, expected start TBD, expected completion TBD
- In addition, CTDOT has been reconstructing the median of the turnpike in stages, replacing the pre-existing steel guide rail and grass divider with a six-foot-wide (1.8 m), 48-inch-tall (120 cm) Jersey barrier along the highway's length from the Baldwin Bridge to the New York state line.
1. Exit 49 was permanently closed in October 2006 as part of this project. Access to Stiles Street is now provided at exit 50 via the newly constructed Waterfront Connector. The southbound on-ramp still exists onto the Pearl Harbor Memorial Bridge.
2. The southbound off-ramp and northbound on-ramp for exit 28 were removed in 2000 during reconstruction of the Connecticut Turnpike in Bridgeport.
3. Replacement of the Pearl Harbor Memorial Bridge in New Haven was planned to start in 2007. Due to the rising cost of materials however, there were no contractors interested in the project when it was advertised for bid in 2006. ConnDOT broke the project up into several smaller contracts, with construction completed on all contracts by November 2016.

== Tolls ==
Tolls on the Connecticut Turnpike have been a source of controversy from the turnpike's opening in 1958 to the removal of tolls in 1985, and the debate continues today. The Connecticut Turnpike originally opened with a barrier toll system (or open system), unlike toll roads in neighboring states, which used a ticket system (or closed system) for collecting tolls. Initially tolls on the Connecticut Turnpike were $0.25, and the toll barriers were located in the following locations: Greenwich, Norwalk, Stratford, West Haven, Branford, Madison, Montville, and Plainfield. Tolls also were collected until 1969 in Old Saybrook at the west end of the Baldwin Bridge over the Connecticut River. Additionally, unlike other toll roads which featured widely spaced interchanges and generally ran along the outskirts of major urban centers, the Connecticut Turnpike was built through the middle of several large cities (notably Stamford, Bridgeport, and New Haven) and has over 90 interchanges along its 129-mile (208 km) length—50 of which are along the 50-mile (80 km) stretch between the New York state line and New Haven. The close spacing of interchanges, placement of mainline toll barriers and the lack of ramp tolls meant the only sections of the Turnpike that were truly tolled were between the interchanges immediately before and following each mainline barrier. Consequentially, motorists familiar with the local area around each of the toll barriers could essentially travel the Turnpike toll-free by exiting before the toll plaza, use local streets to bypass the toll, and re-enter the Turnpike past the toll plaza.

=== Token war with New York City Subway ===
There was some controversy in the early 1980s when New York City Subway riders discovered that tokens purchased for use in the Connecticut Turnpike toll booths were of the same size and weight as New York City Subway tokens. Since the turnpike tokens cost less than one third as much, they began showing up in subway collection boxes regularly. Connecticut authorities initially agreed to change the size of their tokens, but later reneged and the problem went unsolved until 1985, when Connecticut discontinued tolls on the turnpike. At that time, the MTA was paid 17.5 cents for each of more than two million tokens that had been collected during the three-year "token war".

=== Abolition of tolls ===
After the 1983 truck crash at the Stratford toll plaza, toll opponents pressured the State of Connecticut to remove tolls from the turnpike in 1985. Three years later, these same opponents successfully lobbied the Connecticut General Assembly to pass legislation abolishing tolls on all of Connecticut's highways (with the exception of two car ferries across the Connecticut River in Chester and Glastonbury). While the 1983 Stratford accident was cited as the main reason for abolishing tolls in Connecticut, the underlying reason was that federal legislation at that time forbade states with toll roads from using federal funds for road projects. Because the Mianus River Bridge was rebuilt with federal highway funds following its June 1983 collapse, Connecticut was required by Section 113(c) of the Federal Aid Highway Act of 1956 to remove tolls from the turnpike once its construction bonds were paid off.

The debate over tolls on the Connecticut Turnpike did not end in 1988 with the abolition of tolls. Prior to their removal in 1985, the tolls generated over $65 million annually. Since their removal in the late 1980s, Connecticut lawmakers have continuously discussed reinstating tolls, but have balked at bringing tolls back out of concern of having to repay $2.6 billion in federal highway funds that Connecticut received for turnpike construction projects following the abolition of tolls.

During the economic recession of the early 1990s, legislators studied reinstating tolls on parts of the Connecticut Turnpike and portions of highways around Hartford to make up for budget deficits. Proposals for reinstating tolls were scrapped in lieu of implementing an income tax and increasing the state gasoline tax and sales tax, and imposing a new tax on corporate windfall profits.

=== Continuation of toll debate ===
With continual budget woes in Hartford, the idea of reinstating tolls resurfaced in January 2010. State Representative Tony Guerrera estimated a $5 toll at Connecticut's borders could generate $600 million in revenue. Governor Dannel P. Malloy expressed pessimism that toll revenue would be spent exclusively on infrastructure repairs, but a need to generate additional revenue, paired with decreases in traditional highway funding sources (such as federal aid and gas tax revenue) means the idea could receive serious consideration in the state legislature.

== Services ==
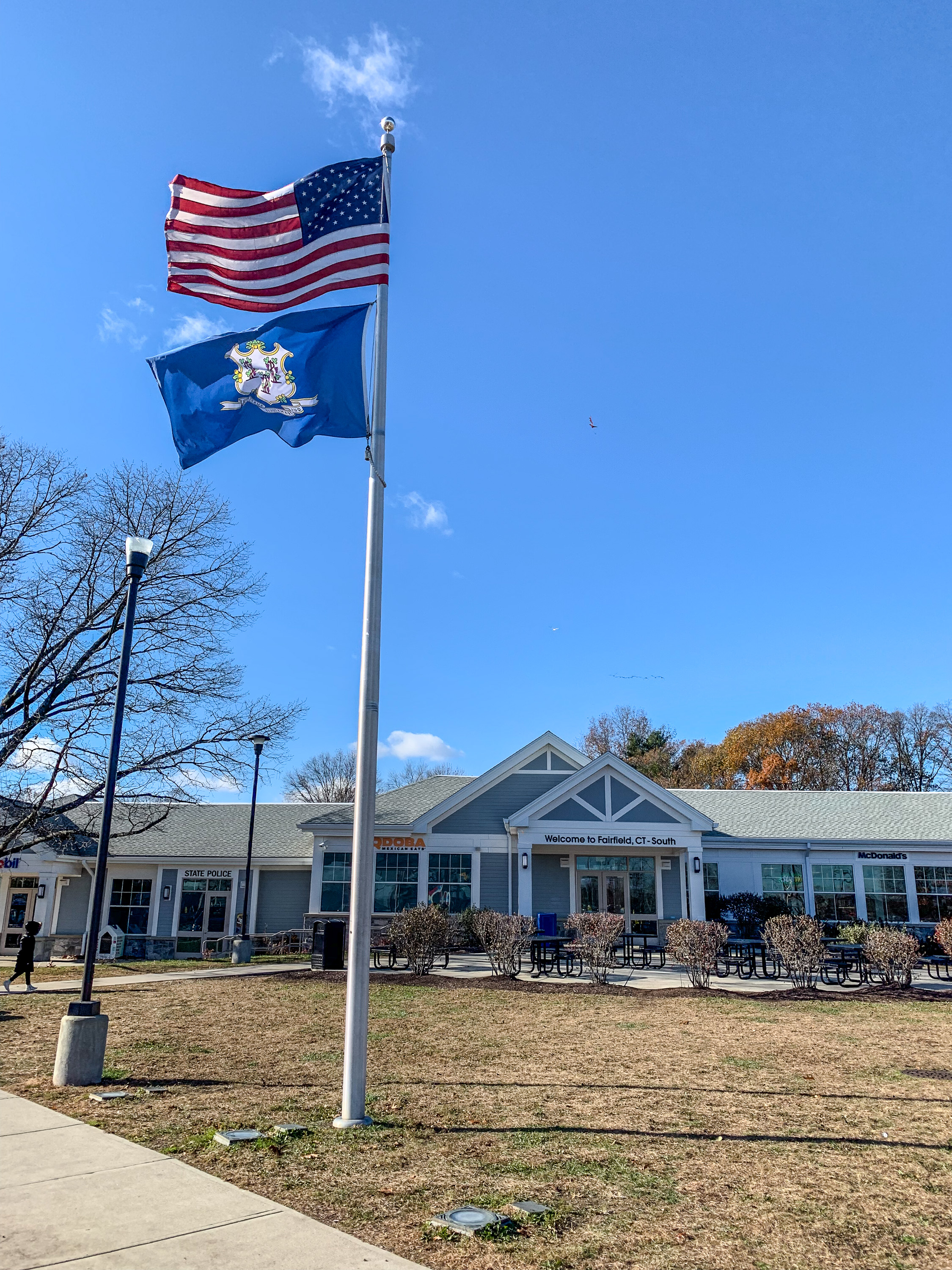
Fairfield Service Plaza southbound

The turnpike has 13 service plazas, which are open 24 hours a day. All feature a Subway, a Dunkin' Donuts, a convenience store and fuel service provided by ExxonMobil (branded as Mobil). Most plazas also offer a variety of other food service options, including McDonald's and Sbarro. From 2011 to 2015, the original plazas were rebuilt with new and expanded buildings and improved fueling facilities. Prior to the rebuilding, the plazas on the I-395 section only had a convenience store.

- Darien southbound—between exits 10 and 9—food and fuel—rebuilt 2013
- Darien northbound—between exits 12 and 13—food and fuel—Connecticut Welcome Center—Rebuilt 2013. The McDonald's restaurant at this service area claims to be the busiest in the country.
- Fairfield northbound and southbound—between exits 21 and 22—food and fuel—rebuilt 2014
- Milford northbound and southbound—between exits 40 and 41—food and fuel—rebuilt 2011
- Branford northbound and southbound—between exits 53 and 54—food and fuel—rebuilt 2013–14
- Madison northbound and southbound—between exits 60 and 61—food and fuel—NB rebuilt 2014, SB rebuilt 2015
- Montville southbound only—between exits 9 and 6—food and fuel—rebuilt 2013
- Plainfield northbound and southbound—between exits 32 and 35—food and fuel—rebuilt 2012

The former northbound Montville service area has been turned into a State Police barracks.

In addition to the service areas listed above, there is a rest area, with restrooms, picnic area, vending machines, and tourist information, located northbound at milepost 74 between exits 65 and 66. In July 2016, the rest area was closed due to budget cuts and barriers were placed on the highway blocking access to the facility. In September 2019, the rest area was reopened on a seasonal basis, being closed from November until mid May (with no access during that time).

There are three State Police stations located on the turnpike: Troop F: Westbrook at milepost 74 on southbound side of turnpike. Troop E: Montville at milepost 96 on northbound side of turnpike (at former service plaza). Troop G: Bridgeport at milepost 29 and the junction with Route 25 and Route 8 (on surface road, exit 27, just below interchange).

There is one weigh station located northbound at milepost 2 in Greenwich, at the location of the former toll plaza. Weigh stations on both sides of the turnpike used to exist near exit 18 in Westport; these were removed during the 1990s. The former southbound weigh station in Westport is now used by CTDOT to store construction materials, while the northbound station was demolished; the grounds returned to their natural state.

The administration building for the former West Haven toll plaza can still be seen by drivers between exits 42 and 43. Today, CTDOT uses the old toll building as a maintenance facility.

In 2013, Telsa Supercharger points for electric vehicles were added at each Milford plaza, the second along I-95, with new charging stations, including CHAdeMO-compatible points, added through the years to other service plazas.

== Exit list ==
Exits were renumbered to mile-based numbering on the I-395 and SR 695 portions of the turnpike as part of a sign replacement project in 2015. Exits are set to be renumbered on the I-95 portion of the turnpike in 2028.

County	Location	mi	km	Old exit	New exit	Destinations	Notes
Fairfield	Greenwich	0.00	0.00		—	I-95 south to I-287 west – New York, White Plains, Tappan Zee Bridge	Continuation into New York; southern end of I-95 concurrency
Fairfield	Greenwich	0.80	1.29	2	1	Delavan Avenue – Byram	
Fairfield	Greenwich	2.00	3.22	Former toll plaza			
Fairfield	Greenwich	2.54	4.09	3	2	Arch Street	
Fairfield	Greenwich	3.73	6.00	4	3	Indian Field Road – Cos Cob	
Fairfield	Greenwich	4.35– 4.85	7.00– 7.81	Mianus River Bridge			
Fairfield	Greenwich	5.53	8.90		5	US 1 – Riverside, Old Greenwich	
Fairfield	Stamford	6.50– 6.62	10.46– 10.65		6	Harvard Avenue / West Avenue	Signed for Harvard Avenue northbound, West Avenue southbound
Fairfield	Stamford	7.34	11.81		7	Greenwich Avenue to Route 137 north	Northbound exit and southbound entrance; access to Route 137 via SSR 493
Fairfield	Stamford	7.68	12.36		8	Canal Street	Northbound exit and southbound entrance
Fairfield	Stamford				7	To Route 137 north / Atlantic Street	Southbound exit and northbound entrance
Fairfield	Stamford	8.20	13.20		8	Elm Street	Southbound exit and northbound entrance
Fairfield	Stamford	9.28	14.93		9	US 1 / Route 106 north – Glenbrook	Southern terminus of Route 106
Fairfield	Darien	10.75	17.30		10	Noroton	Access via Noroton Avenue
Fairfield	Darien	11.61	18.68		11	US 1 – Darien, Rowayton	
Fairfield	Darien	12.23	19.68		12	Route 136 (Tokeneke Road) – Rowayton	Northbound exit and southbound entrance
Fairfield	Darien	13.16	21.18		13	US 1 (Post Road)	
Fairfield	Norwalk	14.83	23.87		14	US 1 (Connecticut Avenue) – South Norwalk	Signed for US 1 southbound, South Norwalk northbound
Fairfield	Norwalk	15.50	24.94		15	US 7 north – Norwalk, Danbury	Southern terminus of US 7
Fairfield	Norwalk	15.91– 16.08	25.60– 25.88	Yankee Doodle Bridge over the Norwalk River			
Fairfield	Norwalk	16.24	26.14		16	East Norwalk	Access via East Avenue
Fairfield	Norwalk	18.0	29.0	Former toll plaza			
Fairfield	Westport	18.14	29.19		17	Route 33 north / Route 136 – Westport, Saugatuck	Southern terminus of Route 33
Fairfield	Westport	20.36	32.77	18	20	Sherwood Island Connector (SSR 476)	To US 1 and Sherwood Island State Park
Fairfield	Fairfield	22.88– 23.12	36.82– 37.21	19	23A	US 1 – Southport	Signed for US 1 southbound, Center Street northbound; signed as exit 23 northbound
Fairfield	Fairfield	23.72	38.17	20	23B	Bronson Road	Southbound exit and northbound entrance
Fairfield	Fairfield	24.38	39.24	21	24	Mill Plain Road	
Fairfield	Fairfield	25.03	40.28	22	25A	Round Hill Road – Service Plaza	Northbound exit and southbound entrance
Fairfield	Fairfield	25.22	40.59	22	25A	Route 135 (North Benson Road)	Southbound exit and northbound entrance
Fairfield	Fairfield	25.73	41.41	23	25B	US 1 (Kings Highway)	
Fairfield	Fairfield	26.70	42.97	24	26	Black Rock Turnpike	Access via US 1
Fairfield	Bridgeport	27.44	44.16	25	27	Commerce Drive / State Street	Northbound exit and southbound entrance
Fairfield	Bridgeport	27.66	44.51	25	27	Route 130 (Fairfield Avenue)	Southbound exit and northbound entrance
Fairfield	Bridgeport	28.30	45.54	26	28A	Wordin Avenue	Signed as exit 28 southbound
Fairfield	Bridgeport	29.00	46.67	27	28B	Lafayette Boulevard – Downtown Bridgeport	Northbound exit and southbound entrance
Fairfield	Bridgeport	29.03	46.72	27A	29A (NB); 29C (SB)	Route 25 north / Route 8 north – Trumbull, Waterbury	Southern terminus and exits 1A and 1B on Route 25 south/Route 8 south; signed as exit 29A northbound and exit 29C southbound
Fairfield	Bridgeport	29.15	46.91	27B 27C	29A	Transportation Center, Long Island Ferry, Total Mortgage Arena	Southbound exit and northbound entrance; access via Lafayette Street
Fairfield	Bridgeport	29.15	46.91	27B 27C	29A	Lafayette Boulevard – Downtown Bridgeport	Southbound exit and northbound entrance
Fairfield	Bridgeport	29.33– 29.81	47.20– 47.97	P.T. Barnum Bridge over the Pequonnock River			
Fairfield	Bridgeport	29.87	48.07	28	29B	Route 127 north (East Main Street) / Route 130	Northbound exit and southbound entrance; southern terminus of Route 127; Route 130 not signed
Fairfield	Bridgeport	30.19	48.59	29	30	Route 130 (Stratford Avenue)	Access via Seaview Avenue
Fairfield	Bridgeport–Stratford line	31.07– 31.30	50.00– 50.37	30	31	Route 113 north (Lordship Boulevard) / Surf Avenue	Signed for Route 113 northbound, Surf Avenue southbound; southern terminus of Route 113
Fairfield	Stratford	32.12– 32.30	51.69– 51.98	31	32A	Honeyspot Road / South Avenue / Stratford Avenue	Signed for Honeysport Road northbound, South Avenue southbound
Fairfield	Stratford	32.87	52.90	32	32B	West Broad Street – Stratford	
Fairfield	Stratford	33.0	53.1	Former toll plaza			
Fairfield	Stratford	34.00	54.72		33	US 1 / Route 110 north (East Main Street) / Ferry Boulevard (Route 130 west)	Southern terminus of Route 110
Housatonic River		34.25– 34.86	55.12– 56.10	Moses Wheeler Bridge			
New Haven	Milford	35.37	56.92	34	35A	US 1 – Milford	
New Haven	Milford	35.85	57.69	35	35B	School House Road / Sub Way / Bic Drive	To Subway headquarters
New Haven	Milford	36.69	59.05		36	Plains Road	
New Haven	Milford	37.45	60.27	37	37A	High Street	Northbound exit and southbound entrance
New Haven	Milford	37.60	60.51	38	37B	To Route 15 (Merritt Parkway / Wilbur Cross Parkway)	Access via Milford Parkway and exits 2A and 2B on Milford Parkway south; signed as exit 37 southbound
New Haven	Milford	39.13	62.97		39	US 1 – Downtown Milford	Signed as exits 39A (US 1 south) and 39B (US 1 north)
New Haven	Milford				40	Old Gate Lane (SR 708 east) to Woodmont Road	Northbound exit only
New Haven	Milford	40.25	64.78		40	Woodmont Road	No northbound exit
New Haven	Orange	41.80	67.27		41	Marsh Hill Road	
New Haven	West Haven	43.93	70.70	42	43	Route 162 (Saw Mill Road)	
New Haven	West Haven	44.0	70.8	Former toll plaza			
New Haven	West Haven	44.87	72.21	43	45	Campbell Avenue – Downtown West Haven	Northbound exit and southbound entrance
New Haven	West Haven	45.19	72.73	43	45	Route 122 north (First Avenue)	Southbound exit and northbound entrance; southern terminus of Route 122
New Haven	New Haven	46.06	74.13	44	46A	Route 10 north (Ella T. Grasso Boulevard) to Route 34 west – Downtown New Haven, Yale Stadiums	Southern terminus of Route 10; former exit 45 southbound; Downtown New Haven not signed northbound
New Haven	New Haven	46.82– 47.26	75.35– 76.06	46	46B	Long Wharf Drive / Sargent Drive	
New Haven	New Haven	47.46– 47.75	76.38– 76.85	47	47A	Oak Street Connector (SR 724 west) – Downtown New Haven	Signed as MLK Boulevard; former Route 34
New Haven	New Haven	47.58– 47.91	76.57– 77.10	48	47B	I-91 north – Hartford	Southern terminus and exits 1A and 1C on I-91 south
New Haven	New Haven	47.80– 48.67	76.93– 78.33	Pearl Harbor Memorial Bridge over Quinnipiac River			
New Haven	New Haven	49.21	79.20	50	48	US 1 / Route 337 east / Woodward Avenue – Lighthouse Point, Port Area	Northbound exit and southbound entrance; US 1/Route 337 not signed
New Haven	East Haven	49.50– 50.22	79.66– 80.82	51	49	US 1 (Frontage Road) – Lighthouse Point	Signed for East Haven northbound, Lighthouse Point southbound
New Haven	East Haven	50.53	81.32	52	50	Route 100 (North High Street) – East Haven	Southbound exit and northbound entrance
New Haven	Branford	51.0	82.1	Former toll plaza			
New Haven	Branford	52.33	84.22	53	52	To US 1 / Route 142 west / Route 146 east – Short Beach	Northbound exit and southbound entrance; access via SR 794
New Haven	Branford	53.24	85.68	54	53	Cedar Street (SR 740) – Branford	
New Haven	Branford	55.19	88.82		55	US 1 (East Main Street) – North Branford	North Branford not signed southbound
New Haven	Branford	56.25	90.53		56	Leetes Island Road – Stony Creek	
New Haven	Guilford	59.32	95.47	57	59	US 1 (Boston Post Road) – North Branford	North Branford not signed northbound
New Haven	Guilford	60.23	96.93	58	60	Route 77 – North Guilford, Guilford	
New Haven	Guilford	61.49	98.96	59	61	US 1 / Route 146 / Goose Lane	US 1/Route 146 not signed
New Haven	Madison	63.0	101.4	Former toll plaza			
New Haven	Madison	63.48	102.16	60	63	Mungertown Road	Southbound exit and northbound entrance
New Haven	Madison			Madison service plaza			
New Haven	Madison	64.73	104.17	61	64	Route 79 – North Madison, Madison	
New Haven	Madison	66.43	106.91	62	66	Hammonasset State Park	Access via SSR 450
Middlesex	Clinton	68.61	110.42	63	68	Route 81 – Clinton, Killingworth	
Middlesex	Westbrook	70.78	113.91	64	70	Route 145 (Horse Hill Road) – Clinton	
Middlesex	Westbrook	73.14	117.71	65	73	Route 153 – Westbrook	
Middlesex	Old Saybrook	74.40	119.74	66	74	Route 166 (Spencer Plain Road)	
Middlesex	Old Saybrook	75.93– 76.74	122.20– 123.50	67	76	Route 154 – Old Saybrook	Signed for Route 154 northbound, Elm Street southbound
Middlesex	Old Saybrook	77.80– 78.28	125.21– 125.98	68	77	US 1 south – Old Saybrook	Southern end of US 1 concurrency; southbound exit and northbound entrance
Middlesex	Old Saybrook	78.07	125.64	69	78	Route 9 north – Essex, Hartford	Southern terminus and exits 1A and 1B on Route 9 south; trumpet interchange
Middlesex	Old Saybrook	78.1	125.7	Former toll plaza			
Connecticut River		78.45– 78.93	126.25– 127.03	Raymond E. Baldwin Bridge			
New London	Old Lyme	79.16	127.40	70	79	US 1 north / Route 156 – Old Lyme	Northern end of US 1 concurrency; US 1 not signed southbound
New London	Old Lyme	83.49	134.36	71	83	Four Mile River Road	
New London	East Lyme	84.02	135.22	72	84	Rocky Neck State Park	Access via SSR 449
New London	East Lyme	85.79	138.07	73	85	Society Road	
New London	East Lyme	87.28	140.46	74	87	Route 161 – Flanders, Niantic	
New London	East Lyme	88.05	141.70	75	88A	US 1 – Waterford, Flanders	
New London	East Lyme	88.48 0.00	142.39 0.00	76	88B	I-95 north – New London, Providence I-395 begins	Northern end of I-95 concurrency; northbound exit and southbound entrance; southern terminus of I-395
New London	Waterford	2.13	3.43	77	2	Route 85 – Waterford, Colchester	
New London	Montville	5.34	8.59	78	5	To Route 32 south – New London	Southbound exit and northbound entrance; access via SR 693
New London	Montville	6.33	10.19	79	6	Route 163 – Uncasville, Montville	
New London	Montville	7.52	12.10	Former toll plaza			
New London	Montville	9.60	15.45	79A	9	Route 2A east – Ledyard, Preston	Southern end of Route 2A concurrency
New London	Norwich	11.08	17.83	80	11	Route 82 – Salem, Downtown Norwich	
New London	Norwich	13.71	22.06	81	13	Route 2 / Route 32 – Norwich, Hartford Route 2A ends	Signed as exits 13A (Rout 2 east/Route 32 south) and 13B (Route 2 west/Route 32 north); northern terminus of Route 2A
New London	Norwich	14.23	22.90	82	14	West Town Street (SR 642) – Yantic, Norwichtown	
New London	Norwich	14.23	22.90	82	14	To Route 2 west / Route 32 north – Hartford, Colchester	Signed southbound only
New London	Norwich	18.17	29.24	83	18	Route 97 – Taftville, Occum	
New London	Lisbon	19.53	31.43	83A	19	Route 169 – Lisbon, Canterbury	Northbound exit and southbound entrance
New London	Lisbon	21.16	34.05	84	21	Route 12 – Jewett City, Griswold, Lisbon, Taftville	Signed as exits 21A (Route 12 north) and 21B (Route 12 south) southbound
New London	Griswold	21.80	35.08	85	22	Route 164 to Route 138 – Preston City, Pachaug	Northbound exit and southbound entrance; access to Route 138 via SR 630
New London	Griswold	22.28	35.86	85	22	Route 138 to Route 164 – Jewett City, Griswold	Southbound exit and northbound entrance; access to Route 164 via SR 629
New London	Griswold	24.26	39.04	86	24	Route 201 – Hopeville, Jewett City	
Windham	Plainfield	28.23	45.43	87	28	Lathrop Road (SR 647)	
Windham	Plainfield	29.65	47.72	88	29	Route 14A – Plainfield, Oneco	
Windham	Plainfield	32.30	51.98	89	32	Route 14 – Central Village, Moosup	
Windham	Plainfield	32.52	52.34	Former toll plaza			
Windham	Plainfield	35.50 0.00	57.13 0.00	90	35	I-395 north to US 6 west – Worcester, Hartford; SR 695 begins	Northern end of I-395 concurrency; northbound exit and southbound entrance; western terminus of SR 695
Windham	Killingly	0.26	0.42	91	1	Squaw Rock Road	Southbound exit and northbound entrance
Windham	Killingly	0.96	1.54	91	1	Ross Road	Northbound exit and southbound entrance
Windham	Killingly	4.49	7.23		–	US 6 east – Providence; SR 695 ends	Northern terminus; eastern terminus of SR 695
1.000 mi = 1.609 km; 1.000 km = 0.621 mi: Concurrency terminus; Incomplete access
