= Connecticut Route 213 =

State highway in New London County, Connecticut, US

Route 213
- Map of New London County in southeastern Connecticut with Route 213 highlighted in red

Route information
- Maintained by CTDOT
- Length: 6.66 mi (10.72 km)
- Existed: 1932–present

Major junctions
- South end: Route 156 in Waterford
- North end: US 1 in New London

Location
- Country: United States
- State: Connecticut
- Counties: New London

Highway system
- Connecticut State Highway System; Interstate; US; State; SSR; SR; Scenic
← Route 209	→ Route 214

Route 213 is a state highway in southeastern Connecticut, running in a fishhook pattern from central Waterford to downtown New London via the shoreline.

== Route description ==
Route 213 begins as Great Neck Road at an intersection with Route 156 in Waterford center. It heads south toward Long Island Sound, then crosses over the Amtrak railroad tracks, then turning east at Goshen Cove after another two miles (3.2 km). It then passes by the entrance to Harkness Memorial State Park and cuts northeast across the shore along Niles Hill Road, crossing Alewife Cove into the city of New London. In New London, it turns north following Ocean Avenue through the southwestern part of the city to end at an intersection with U.S. Route 1 (US 1) in the downtown area.

== History ==
In the 1920s, the road from Downtown New London to Ocean Beach Park (Ocean Avenue from US 1) was designated as a secondary state highway known as Highway 340. In the 1932 state highway renumbering, Ocean Avenue (old Highway 340) and an extension north of US 1 along Jefferson Avenue up to Route 85 was designated as Route 213. In 1963, the southern terminus was moved westward to its current location. In 1972, the northern terminus was moved to Colman Street (modern US 1), and Route 213 ended at a junction with Interstate 95 (then co-signed as US 1). In 1974, Colman Street became one-way southbound and the northbound route was shifted several blocks east to Jefferson Avenue. In 1976, with the rerouting of US 1 to its current location, Route 213 was truncated at its northern end to the current northern terminus.

== Junction list ==
The entire route is in New London County.

Location	mi	km	Destinations	Notes
Waterford	0.00	0.00	Route 156 – Waterford, Niantic	Southern terminus
New London	6.66	10.72	US 1 – Groton, Waterford	Northern terminus
1.000 mi = 1.609 km; 1.000 km = 0.621 mi
