= New England Hebrew Farmers of the Emanuel Society Synagogue and Creamery Site =

- U.S. National Register of Historic Places
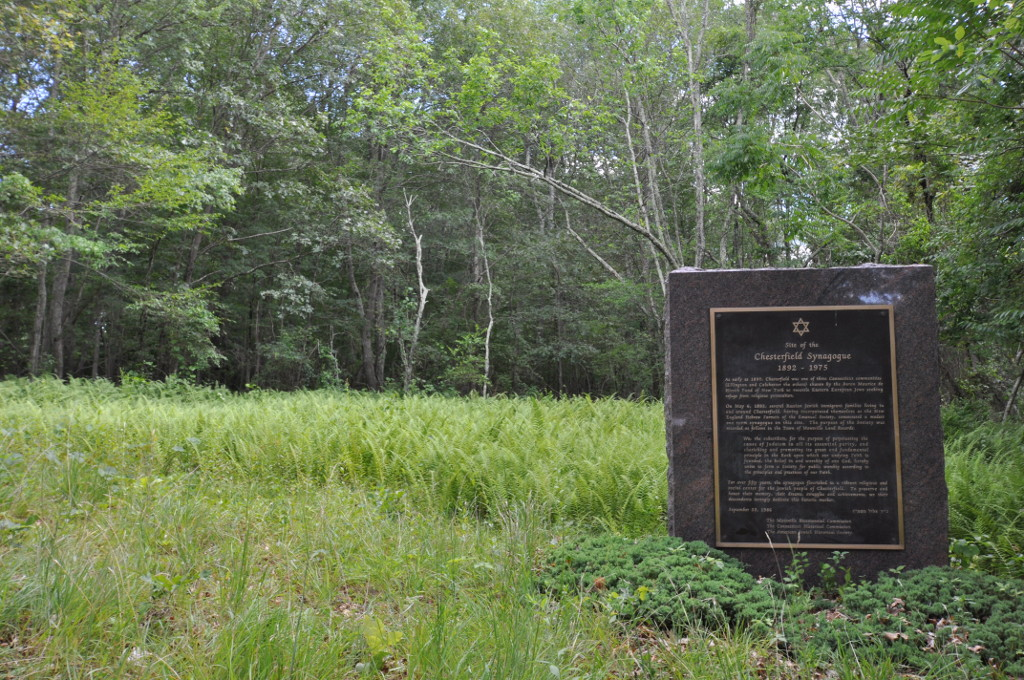

- Location within Connecticut Location within the United States
- Location: Junction of CT 161 & CT 85, Montville, Connecticut
- Coordinates: 41°25′40″N 72°12′55″W
- Built: 1892
- NRHP reference No.: 12000039
- Added to NRHP: February 28, 2012

The New England Hebrew Farmers of the Emanuel Society Synagogue and Creamery Site is a complex of historic archaeological sites near the junction of Connecticut Routes 161 and 85 in Montville, Connecticut. The sites include that of a late 19th-century synagogue, and the remains of a creamery complex operated by local Jewish dairy farmers that was located nearby. It was one of the first rural Jewish settlements in the state, supported financially by the Baron de Hirsch. The site was listed on the National Register of Historic Places in 2012.

== Description ==
The New England Hebrew Farmers of the Emanuel Society Synagogue and Creamery Site is located southwest of the junction of Routes 161 and 85 in the village of Chesterfield. It consists of several parcels, and is partially bisected by Powers Brook, which originally provided power for the creamery. The site is wooded, except for an open grassy area where the synagogue stood. This area is now marked by a commemorative stone plaque. In the woods nearby are foundational remnants of the creamery building and other buildings related to the Jewish community that thrived here around the turn of the 20th century.

The Jewish community in Chesterfield was established in the 1890s as part of an effort by the Baron de Hirsch, a prominent Jewish philanthropist, to resettle Jews fleeing pogroms in Eastern Europe in the United States. Most of the original Jewish settlers in this area were Orthodox Jews who had first settled in Brooklyn, New York. Farmland in southeastern Connecticut was inexpensive at the time, and its purchase was supported financially by de Hirsch and others. A Jewish congregation was formally established in 1890, and was called Society Agudas Achim. A modest wood-frame synagogue was built on this site in 1892, and the creamery was built the same year as a cooperative venture of the congregants as an outlet for the milk they produced. Later buildings include a small powerhouse and a mikvah. The creamery only operated for about twenty years, before changing trends in dairy consumption led to its demise. The building was eventually repurposed as an inn, but was destroyed by fire in 1950. The synagogue was also damaged in the fire, and was also eventually abandoned. It was destroyed by an arsonist in 1975.

Descendendants of some of the original settlers formed a historical society in the 1980s to preserve and remember the legacy of the settlement, resulting in the placement of the commemorative marker, and the site's listings both as a state archaeological site and on the National Register of Historic Places.

== See also ==
- National Register of Historic Places listings in New London County, Connecticut
