= Niantic River =

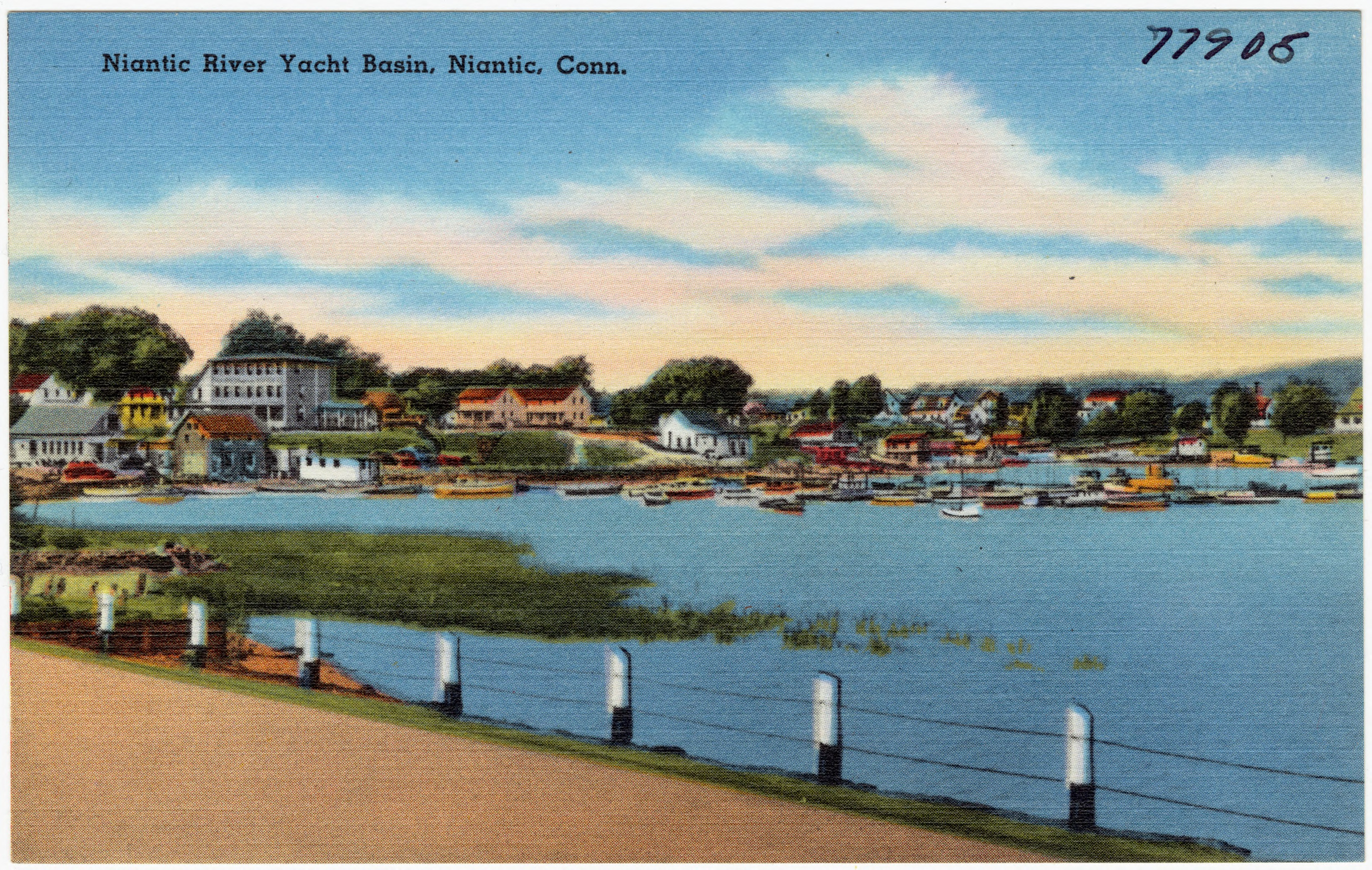

Location
- Country: United States
- State: Connecticut
- Counties: New London

Physical characteristics
- Source: Banning Cove
  - location: East Lyme, New London County, Connecticut, United States
  - coordinates: 41°39′39″N 72°06′37″W
- Mouth: Long Island Sound
  - location: East Lyme, New London County, Connecticut, United States
  - coordinates: 41°32′22″N 72°18′12″W

The Niantic River is a mainly tidal river in eastern Connecticut. It is crossed by the Niantic River Bridge carrying Amtrak's Northeast Corridor. It separates the towns of East Lyme and Waterford. The river is 5.2 miles (8.4 km) long. The distance from the end of Banning Cove to the Niantic River Bridge is approximately 3.4 miles.

== Crossings ==
Town	Carrying
East Lyme/ Waterford	US 1
East Lyme/ Waterford	Route 156
East Lyme/ Waterford	Amtrak

== See also ==
- List of rivers of Connecticut
