= Eliphalet Howd House =

Historic house in Connecticut, United States

- U.S. National Register of Historic Places
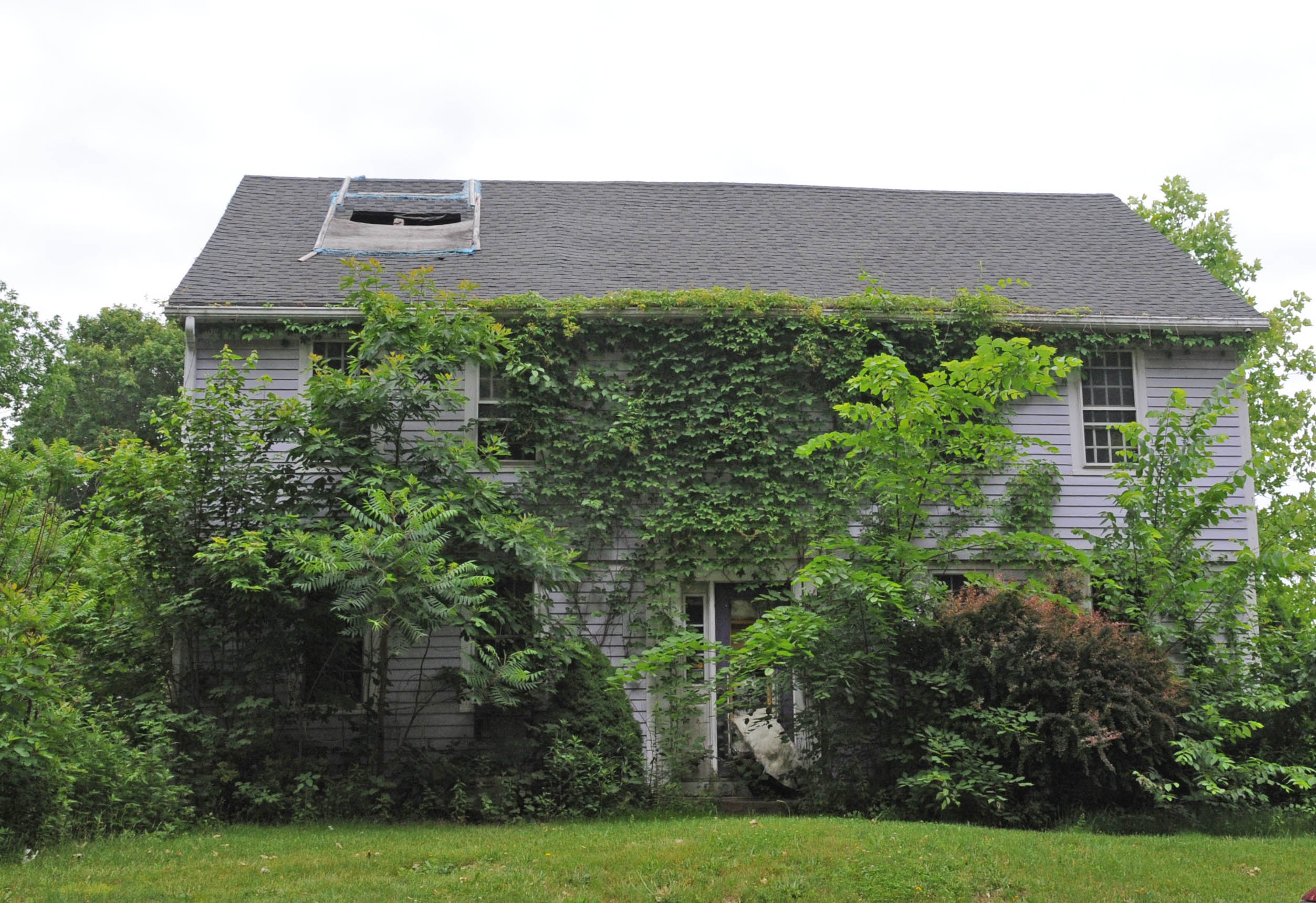
- House in deteriorated condition in 2016

- Location within Connecticut Location within the United States
- Location: 675 East Main Street, Branford, Connecticut
- Coordinates: 41°18′10″N 72°45′28″W
- Area: 1.2 acres (0.49 ha)
- Built: 1730
- Architectural style: Colonial, New England Colonial
- MPS: Colonial Houses of Branford TR
- NRHP reference No.: 88002637
- Added to NRHP: December 1, 1988

The Eliphalet Howd House is a historic house at 675 East Main Street U.S. Route 1 in Branford, Connecticut. Probably built about 1730, it is one of the town's few surviving 18th-century houses, and a good example of a two-story Georgian colonial house. It was listed on the National Register of Historic Places in 1988.

== Description and history ==
The Eliphalet Dowd House is located in Eastern Branford, on the South Side of East Main Street (U.S. Route 1) at Sycamore Lane. It is set near the road, on a property shared by a local private school. It is a 2 1/2-story wood-frame structure, with a side-gable roof and clapboarded exterior. The front facade is five bays wide, with sash windows arranged symmetrically about the center entrance. The entrance has a transom window, and is flanked by pilasters which rise to a frieze and cornice. The second story has a slight overhang above the first floor, and the gable ends on the sides have a similar overhang as well. The main roof cornice has a line of dentil moulding. The house had a stone chimney at its center, which is no longer visible above the roof line.

The house has traditionally been ascribed a construction date of 1754, but land record analysis suggests it is older, and may have been built as early as 1730. Its architectural features suggest a date no later than the third quarter of the 18th century. The house is one of a small number of two-story 18th-century houses in Branford.

== See also ==
- National Register of Historic Places listings in New Haven County, Connecticut
