= Connecticut Route 156 =

State highway in southeastern Connecticut, US

Route 156
- Map of southeastern Connecticut with Route 156 highlighted in red

Route information
- Maintained by CTDOT
- Length: 22.76 mi (36.63 km)
- Existed: 1932–present

Major junctions
- West end: Route 82 in East Haddam
- I-95 / US 1 in Old Lyme
- East end: US 1 in Waterford

Location
- Country: United States
- State: Connecticut
- Counties: Middlesex, New London

Highway system
- Connecticut State Highway System; Interstate; US; State; SSR; SR; Scenic
← Route 155	→ Route 157

Route 156 is a Connecticut state highway running from East Haddam to Waterford.

== Route description ==
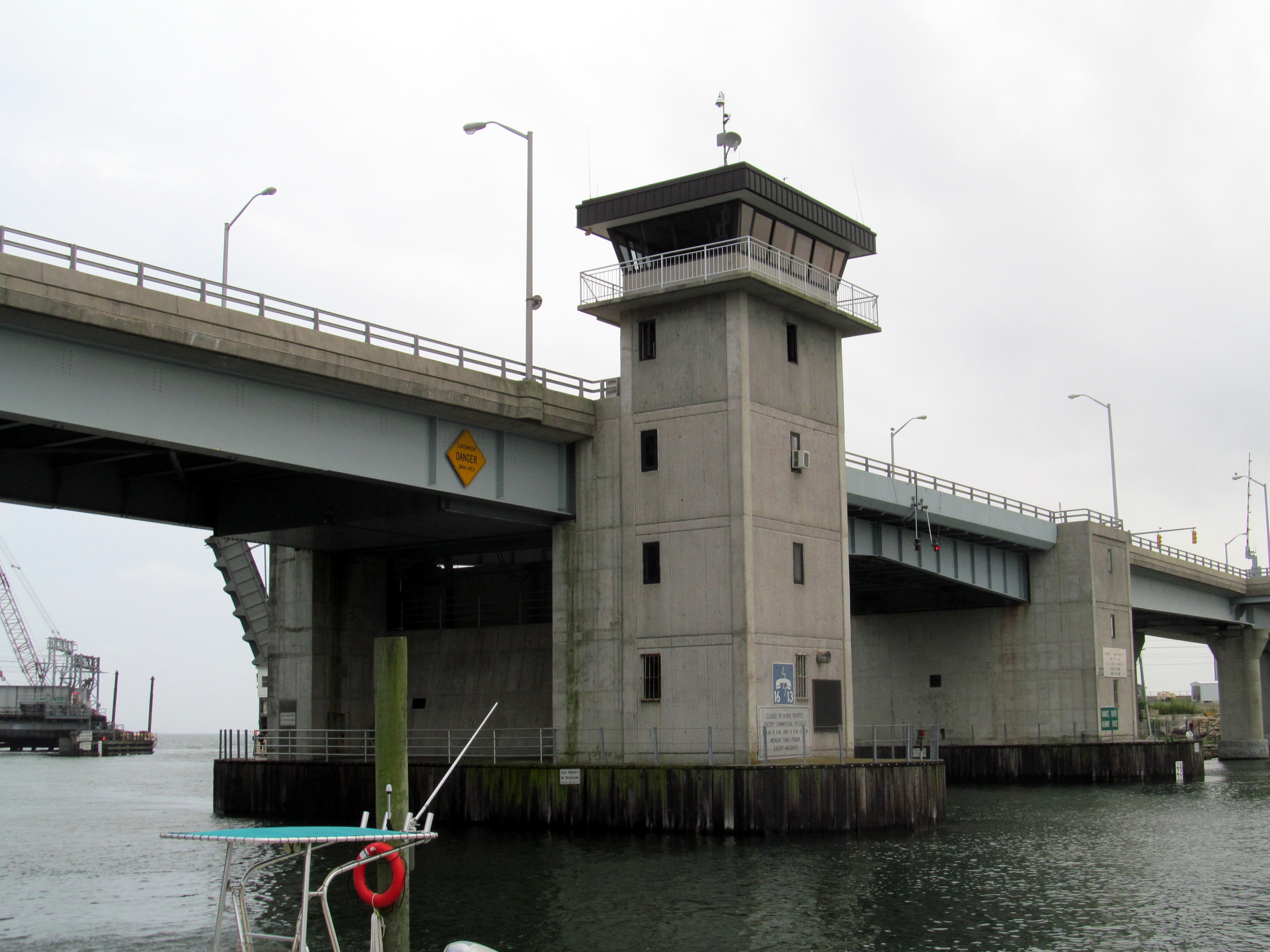
Drawbridge carrying CT 156 over the Niantic River between East Lyme and Waterford

Route 156 begins at an intersection with Route 82 in southeastern East Haddam and heads southeast into Lyme. It continues south through Lyme into Old Lyme. In Old Lyme, it continues south, intersecting I-95 and US 1. It then continues south and southeast along the Connecticut River, turning east at Long Island Sound and proceeding along the shore before turning northeast through the South Lyme section of Old Lyme and crossing into East Lyme. It continues east through southern East Lyme past Niantic Bay before crossing the Niantic River into Waterford. In Waterford, it continues east and northeast to end at an intersection with US 1. Although much of the route follows a north-south trajectory, the entire road is signed east-west.

The section of Route 156 in East Haddam and Lyme is designated as a scenic road.

== History ==
In 1922, a loop route of the Boston Post Road (New England Route 1) serving the coastal settlements of the towns of Old Lyme, East Lyme, and Waterford was designated as State Highway 333. At the same time, the road serving the village of Hamburg in the town of Lyme on the east side of the Connecticut River was designated as State Highway 150. In the 1932 state highway renumbering, old Highway 333 was renumbered as Route 156, running from US 1 in Old Lyme to the eastern terminus at US 1 in Waterford. Old Highway 150 from East Haddam to Old Lyme was renumbered to Route 86. In 1948, former Route 86 was absorbed by Route 156 resulting in its modern configuration.

In 1961, the section running from the Lieutenant River to the intersection of Shore Road and McCurdy Road in Old Lyme was reassigned from Ferry Road and McCurdy Road to the current route along Shore Road. Improvements in the Niantic section of East Lyme have been considered several times since 1963, but the only change has been the replacement of the bridge over the Niantic River.

== Junction list ==
County	Location	mi	km	Destinations	Notes
Middlesex	East Haddam	0.00	0.00	Route 82 – Hadlyme, Salem	Western terminus
New London	Old Lyme	8.44	13.58	US 1 north – East Lyme	Western end of US 1 concurrency
New London	Old Lyme	8.54	13.74	I-95 / US 1 south – New Haven, New London	Exit 79 on I-95; eastern end of US 1 concurrency
New London	East Lyme	16.05	25.83	To I-95 – New London, New Haven	Access via SSR 449
New London	East Lyme	19.01	30.59	Route 161 north – Flanders, Chesterfield	Southern terminus of Route 161
New London	Niantic River	19.69– 20.04	31.69– 32.25	Niantic River Bridge	
New London	Waterford	22.24	35.79	Route 213 north – Harkness Memorial State Park	Southern terminus of Route 213
New London	Waterford	22.76	36.63	US 1 – New London, Groton, East Lyme	Eastern terminus
1.000 mi = 1.609 km; 1.000 km = 0.621 mi: Concurrency terminus
