= Connecticut Route 11 =

State highway in New London County, Connecticut, US

Route 11
- ConnDOT Employees Memorial Highway

Route information
- Maintained by CTDOT
- Length: 7.1 mi (11.4 km)
- Existed: July 1971–present

Major junctions
- South end: Route 82 in Salem
- North end: Route 2 in Colchester

Location
- Country: United States
- State: Connecticut
- Counties: New London

Highway system
- Connecticut State Highway System; Interstate; US; State; SSR; SR; Scenic
← Route 10	→ Route 12

Route 11, also known as the ConnDOT Employees Memorial Highway, is a freeway in east-central Connecticut, serving traffic between the Hartford and New London areas (which also use Route 2). Route 11 originally was planned run from Colchester to Waterford. However, only about half of the highway was constructed; one end is in Salem. As a result, many people in New London County, who would have benefitted most from the original project, derisively refer to the highway as "Route 5½" for its half-done construction.

The delays, and eventual effective cancellation of the project in 2009, were due to funding and environmental issues. Advocates for the highway have pushed for open-road tolling on Route 11 to complete the project.

== Route description ==
Route 11's southern terminus is the interchange with Route 82 in the town of Salem. It proceeds northward, soon crossing the Eightmile River. The road continues about 2.3 miles (3.7 km) crossing over Witch Meadow Road (exit 13) at a diamond interchange, which leads to Salem center. Route 11 soon crosses into the town of Colchester, then has an interchange with Lake Hayward Road (exit 17) about 2.8 miles (4.5 km) after crossing the town line. Lake Hayward Road, an unsigned state highway known as State Road 637, provides access to eastbound Route 2, Route 85, and Route 354. Northbound Route 11 merges onto westbound Route 2 0.6 miles later.

== History ==
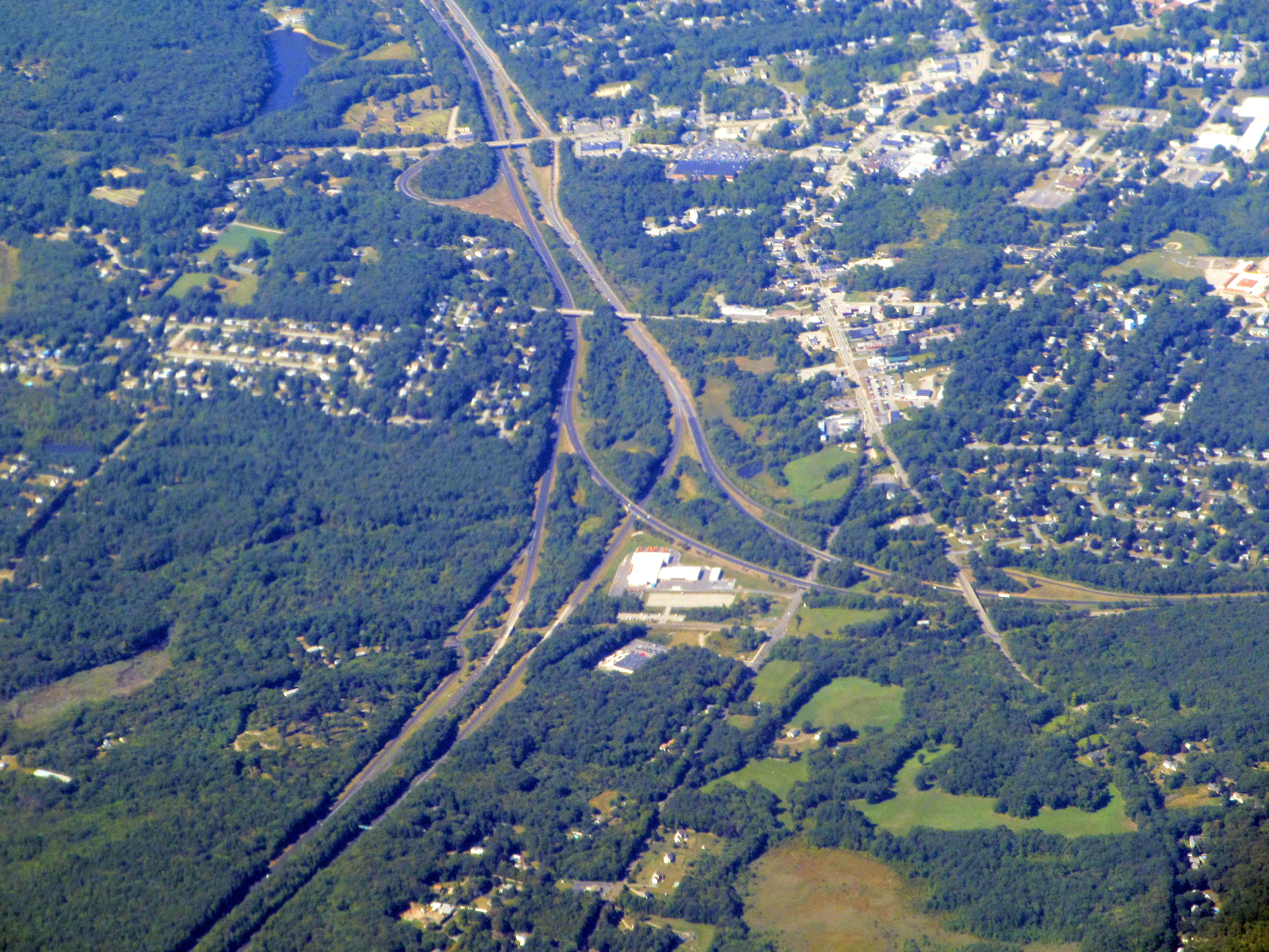
Aerial view of the split between Route 11 (bottom left) and Route 2

An expressway connecting Route 2 in Colchester and the Connecticut Turnpike in New London had been planned as far back as the 1950s. It was originally designated the Route 85 Expressway. Construction began in 1966 but was halted due to lack of funding. The half-finished expressway opened in 1972 as Route 11.

Plans to finish Route 11 were revived in the late 1990s due to increased traffic in the area (primarily due to Foxwoods Resort Casino and Mohegan Sun). Contrary to local opposition to new highways, most of the residents of the area were in favor of completing the highway. Subsequently, Route 11 was submitted to the U.S. Department of Transportation for inclusion on the federal government's "fast-track" streamlining process, designed for federal agencies to quickly complete necessary steps on stalled projects, and was approved in August 2004. Funding for Route 11 has also been included in the proposed 2006 Connecticut state transportation bill. The State of Connecticut purchased, and still owns, the right-of-way for the project in Salem.

The Final Environmental Impact Statement for extending Route 11 was issued on October 26, 2007. The EIS was published three months behind schedule due to a dispute between ConnDOT and the consulting firm that prepared the EIS—the Macguire Group—over payment for services rendered.

A Record of Decision from federal officials was expected by the end of 2007, but the Environmental Protection Agency had expressed concern over the environmental mitigation plan for Route 11, and expressed it still favored the Route 82/85 upgrade over extending Route 11. Because the EPA has veto power over Army Corps of Engineers permits, EPA opposition could have forced the delay or cancellation of the Route 11 extension. In December 2007, Federal Highway Administration extended the FEIS review period through the end of January 2008 to provide the EPA with a detailed environmental mitigation plan. Additionally state and federal elected officials requested the FHWA and ConnDOT present a detailed financial management plan for activities related to the extension. In September 2009, ConnDOT indicated that due to funding constraints, it will indefinitely suspend further work on Route 11.

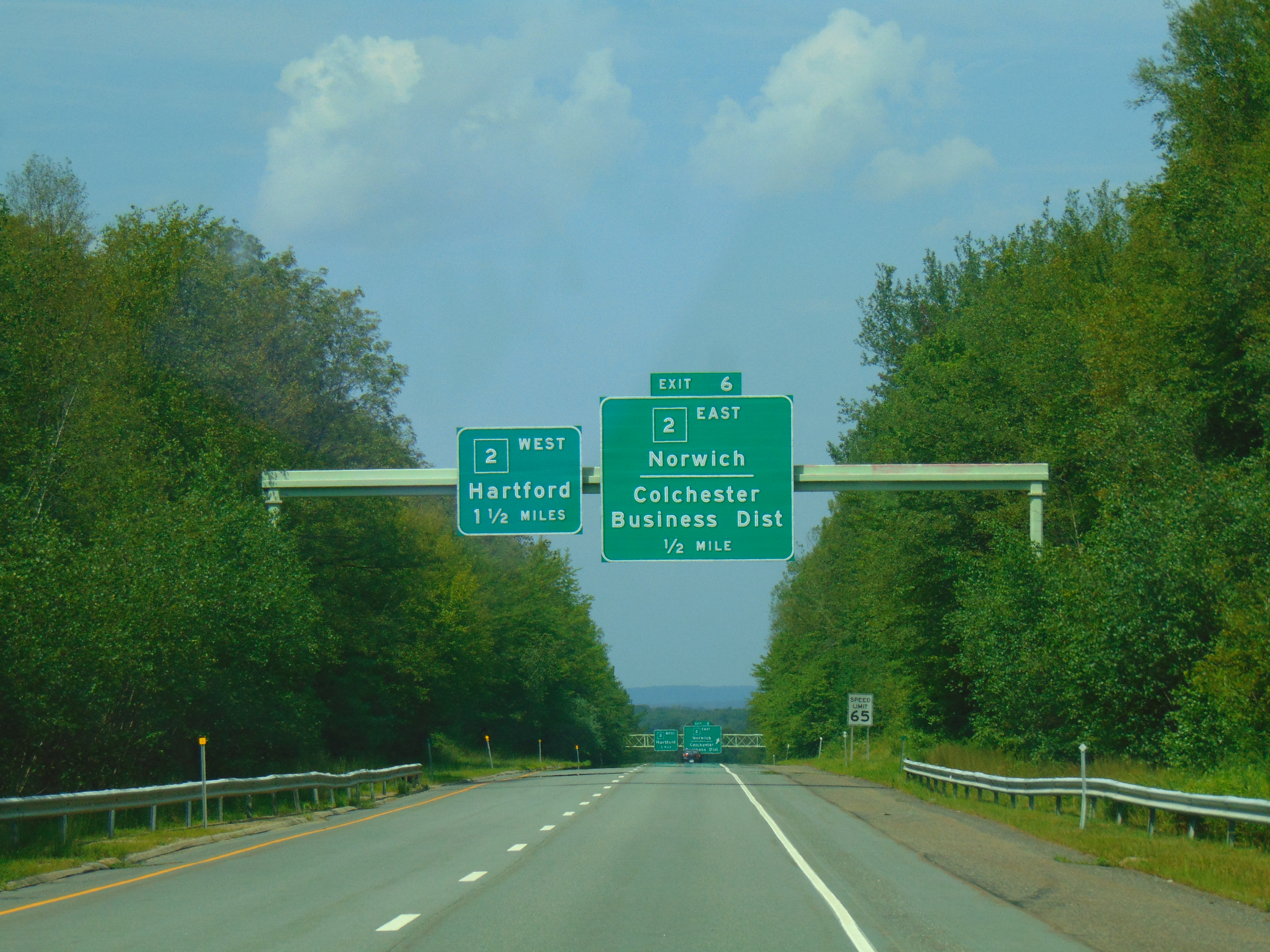
CT 11 approaching its intersection with CT 2

In 2011, Governor Dan Malloy indicated that completing Route 11 to the I-95/I-395 interchange was a high priority for the state and ordered ConnDOT to resume environmental and funding studies. In August 2011, ConnDOT initiated a financial study that focused on building the Route 11 extension as a toll road, which could potentially accelerate construction of the extension by using a combination of funds from tolls and traditional state and federal highway funds.

The final section of Route 11 was proposed to be built not to Interstate highway standards. While it would have been built as a fully controlled-access freeway, it would not have met Interstate standards due to two key design features: First, opposing lanes of traffic would have been separated by a concrete Jersey barrier versus the wide median on the existing Route 11 section. Secondly, the greenway was being planned to have curve radii that would have been tighter than what is allowed by Interstate standards, although it would have still had a design speed of 70 mph (110 km/h). With these two features, Route 11 would have been built using a footprint that was less than half the size required for an expressway built to Interstate standards.

The Route 11 Greenway Authority was created by the state legislature in 2000 as a committee designated with the responsibility of purchasing land on either side of the completed Route 11 to be preserved as hiking and biking trails and open space. As of 2010, the Authority still held monthly meetings and the funds from the State of Connecticut still existed to purchase land for the Greenway, despite the near certainty the expressway itself would never be completed. The Authority did not have the power of eminent domain. The cross-section profile for the Route 11 Greenway would have been similar to that of the Route 8 expressway through the Naugatuck State Forest between Beacon Falls and Naugatuck.

=== Extension cancelled ===
On October 19, 2016, the Federal Highway Administration published a notice in the Federal Register announcing the withdrawal of the Notice of Intent to Prepare an Environmental Impact Statement, that effectively ceased any further work on the Route 11 extension. The major issues cited in the FHWA and ConnDOT abandoning the Route 11 extension include: opposition from the Environmental Protection Agency (the EPA has long opposed the extension of the Route 11 freeway, and would not approve any "build" alternative), the prohibitive cost and lack of funding for the extension, and the discovery of pre-colonial-era Native American and colonial-era archaeological sites along the route that could not be avoided. Local officials who have long supported completing Route 11 conceded that spot improvements to the Route 85 corridor could be done more quickly and at a much lower cost than extending Route 11 to I-95.

=== Unused bridges, roadbed and ramps ===
The northernmost mile (1.6 km) of the Route 11 extension would have been built more to Interstate standards as it transitioned between the Greenway profile and the profile of the existing segment ending at Exit 4 in Salem. When Route 11 opened to its present-day terminus at Route 82, crews had cleared and graded the roadbed for about a mile beyond Route 82 for the anticipated extension south, including two deep rock cuts and a pair of unused bridges over Route 82 just past present terminus. Two "ghost ramps" built during the 1970s would have been paved as the new roadway was built, creating full diamond interchange at Exit 4. The bridges, ramps, and rock cuts, as well as unused storm drains, were left behind when work stopped on Route 11 in 1972.

An interchange with Interstate 95 and 395 was also planned to be built as part of the highway extension, and accounted for about half of the $1 billion cost of the project.

== Exit list ==
Exit numbers were converted to mile-based numbering in 2025. Mileage is based on the originally planned southern terminus at I-95 that includes the approximately 9-mile unbuilt section from Route 82 to I-95. The entire route is in New London County.

Location	mi	km	Old exit	New exit	Destinations	Notes
Salem	0.00	0.00	4	–	Route 82 – Salem, Hadlyme	Southern terminus; at-grade intersection
Salem	0.65	1.05	Bridge over the Eightmile River			
Salem	2.96	4.76	5	13	Witch Meadow Road – Salem	
Colchester			6	17	Lake Hayward Road (SR 637 east) to Route 2 east / Route 85 / Route 354 – Norwich, Colchester Business District	No northbound entrance; signed for Route 2 east northbound, Route 85/354/Lake Hayward southbound
Colchester	7.10	11.43	–	–	Route 2 west – Hartford	Northern terminus; exit 24 on Route 2 east
1.000 mi = 1.609 km; 1.000 km = 0.621 mi: Incomplete access
