= Connecticut Route 161 =

State highway in New London County, Connecticut, US

Route 161
- Map of New London County in southeastern Connecticut with Route 161 highlighted in red

Route information
- Maintained by CTDOT
- Length: 8.03 mi (12.92 km)
- Existed: 1932–present

Major junctions
- South end: Route 156 in East Lyme
- I-95 in East Lyme
- North end: Route 85 in Montville

Location
- Country: United States
- State: Connecticut
- Counties: New London

Highway system
- Connecticut State Highway System; Interstate; US; State; SSR; SR; Scenic
← Route 160	→ Route 162

Route 161 is a state highway in southeastern Connecticut, running from the shoreline village of Niantic in East Lyme to the village of Chesterfield in Montville.

== Route description ==
Route 161 begins as Pennsylvania Avenue at an intersection with Route 156 in the village of Niantic in East Lyme. It proceeds north for 1.1 miles (1.8 km), curving left then turning right onto Flanders Road. Route 161 continues north for another 1.8 miles (2.9 km) until it reaches the interchange with I-95 (at exit 87). After crossing under I-95, it continues for another 0.4 miles (0.64 km) to the Boston Post Road US 1 in the village of Flanders, where it becomes Chesterfield Road. In this area, one can access East Lyme High School and the Flanders Shopping Plaza from Route 161. The road continues north through the northeastern portion of the town of East Lyme for 3.5 miles (5.6 km) before entering the town of Montville, where the road name changes to Flanders Road. The road turns northeast for another 1.1 miles (1.8 km) to end at an intersection with Route 85 in the village of Chesterfield.

== History ==
The Niantic-Flanders-Chesterfield road was a primary state highway in the 1920s known as Highway 188. In the 1932 state highway renumbering, Route 161 was created from the northern half of old Highway 188, running from US 1 in Flanders to Route 85 in Chesterfield. In 1950, Route 161 was extended south to Niantic along former SR 669. At an unconfirmed time after 1965, a section near East Pattagansett Road in East Lyme was rerouted for safety reasons.

== Junction list ==
The entire route is in New London County.

Location	mi	km	Destinations	Notes
East Lyme	0.00	0.00	Route 156 – Old Lyme, Waterford	Southern terminus
East Lyme	3.00	4.83	I-95 – New London, New Haven	Exit 87 on I-95
East Lyme	3.37	5.42	US 1 – Old Lyme, Waterford	
East Lyme	5.22	8.40	Route 11 – New London, Colchester	Proposed
Montville	8.03	12.92	Route 85 – Salem, Waterford	Northern terminus
1.000 mi = 1.609 km; 1.000 km = 0.621 mi: Unopened
