= Milford Parkway (Connecticut) =

Highway in Connecticut, United States

- Daniel S. Wasson Connector
- Map of New Haven County in southern Connecticut with Milford Parkway highlighted in red

Route information
- Length: 2.70 mi (4.35 km)
- Existed: 1942–present
- Restrictions: No commercial vehicles

Major junctions
- South end: I-95 / US 1 in Milford
- North end: Route 15 / Merritt Parkway / Wilbur Cross Parkway in Milford

Location
- Country: United States
- State: Connecticut
- Counties: New Haven

Highway system
- Connecticut State Highway System; Interstate; US; State; SSR; SR; Scenic

The Milford Parkway, officially the Daniel S. Wasson Connector, is a controlled-access parkway between I-95 and U.S. Route 1 and the Merritt and Wilbur Cross Parkways (Route 15) in Milford, New Haven County, Connecticut. The highway is officially designated by the Connecticut Department of Transportation as State Road 796 (SR 796) but is not signed as such. As a designated scenic road, the Milford Parkway is closed to commercial vehicles.

In 2012, the Milford Parkway had an average daily traffic count of 58,800 vehicles in the northbound direction.

== Route description ==
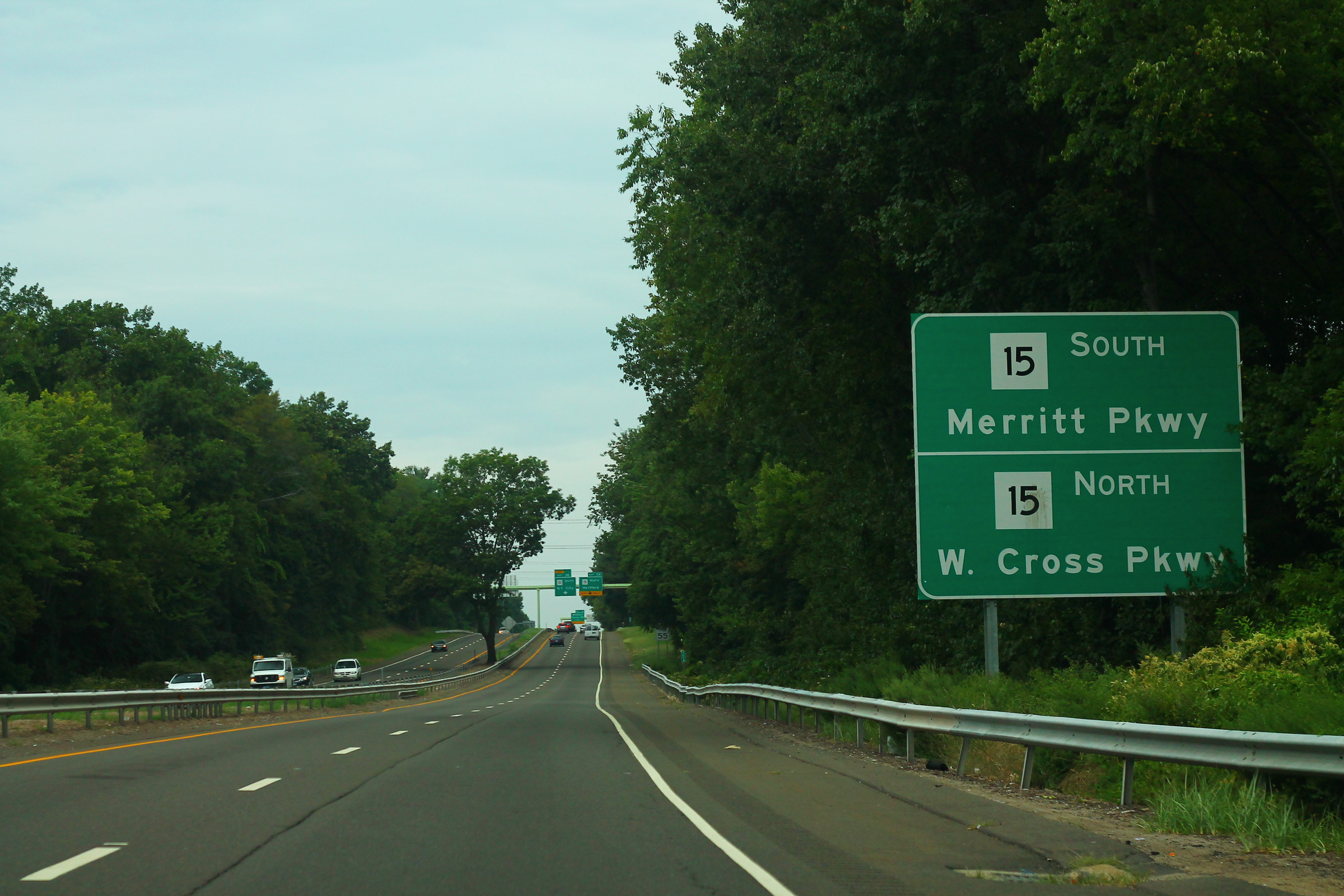
Northbound on the Milford Parkway as it approaches the terminus for both the Merritt and Wilbur Cross Parkways

The Milford Parkway begins at U.S. Route 1 in Milford at a trumpet interchange. It meets Interstate 95 shortly after, and heads north towards Route 15. At exit 3A, the parkway shrinks to two lanes, and has a partial interchange to Wheelers Farms Road by way of Wellington Road, which is also served by exit 55A on the Wilbur Cross Parkway. After the interchange, the Milford Parkway merges with the Merritt Parkway.

On ConnDOT highway maps, the route is referred to as the "Daniel S. Wasson Milford Police Department Connector."

== History ==
At its completion on September 2, 1940, the Merritt Parkway ended at the present-day Sikorsky Bridge crossing over the Housatonic River, and the Wilbur Cross Parkway was planned to continue in the northeast direction towards Hartford. The Milford Parkway was then built as a connection between the two parkways and U.S. Route 1 (US 1). The Milford Parkway was opened to traffic on September 2, 1942.

The long loop ramp connecting to southbound Route 15, including the interchange with Wheelers Farms Road, was completed in 1993.

On June 23, 2003, the parkway was renamed to honor of Daniel S. Wasson, the first police officer to die in the line of duty in the city of Milford. Wasson was killed on April 12, 1987, when he was shot by a motorist he had pulled over.

The parkway is treated mostly as a ramp, signed as "To I-95 / US 1" on Route 15 and Wheelers Farms Road, as well as "To Route 15" on both I-95 and US 1. In summer 2012, exit numbers were applied to the parkway's four interchanges. Also included in the project was the removal of exit signs with the Milford Parkway name on US 1.

== Exit list ==
The entire route is in Milford, New Haven County.

| mi | km | Exit | Destinations | Notes |
|---|---|---|---|---|
| 0.00 | 0.00 | 1A | US 1 north – Milford | Southern terminus |
| 0.26 | 0.42 | 1B | US 1 south | Southbound exit and northbound entrance |
| 0.46– 0.67 | 0.74– 1.08 | 2B-A | I-95 – Bridgeport, New Haven | Signed as exits 2B (I-95 south) & 2A (I-95 north); exits 37-37B on I-95 |
| 1.62 | 2.61 | 3A | Route 15 north (Wilbur Cross Parkway) – Hartford | Northbound exit and southbound entrance; exit 37 on Wilbur Cross Parkway south |
| 2.32 | 3.73 | 4 | Wheelers Farms Road | Northbound exit and southbound entrance |
| 2.70 | 4.35 | 3B | Route 15 south / Merritt Parkway south – New York City | Northern terminus; exit 37 on Merritt Parkway north |
1.000 mi = 1.609 km; 1.000 km = 0.621 mi: Incomplete access
