= Saugatuck, Connecticut =

Census-designated place in Connecticut, United States

- Census-designated place
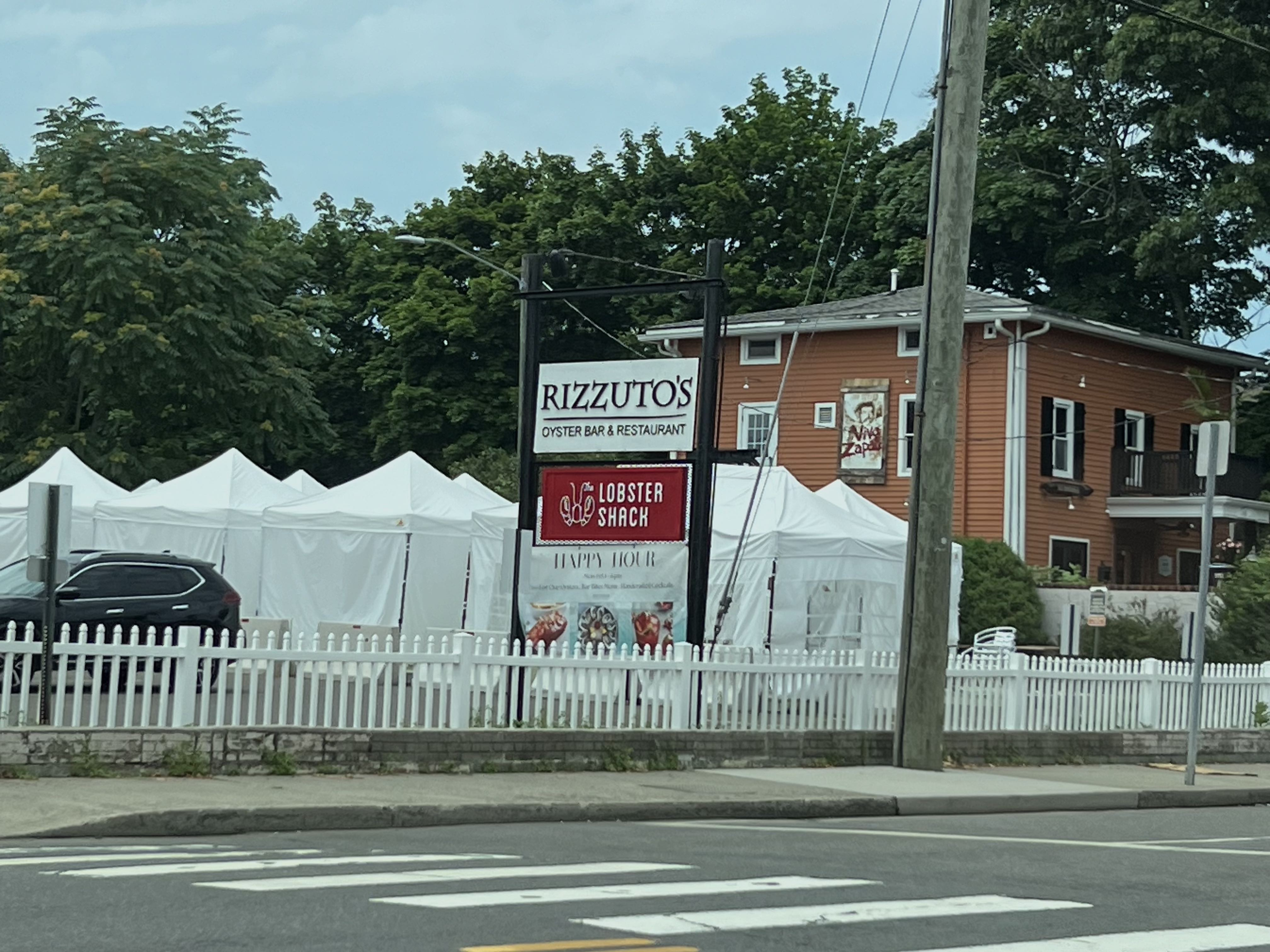
- A view of Riverside Avenue in Saugatuck.

- Location within Connecticut Location within the United States
- Coordinates: 41°7′22″N 73°22′22″W
- Country: United States
- State: Connecticut
- County: Fairfield
- Town: Westport

Area
  - Total: 3.25 sq mi (8.41 km^{2})
  - Land: 1.86 sq mi (4.81 km^{2})
  - Water: 1.39 sq mi (3.60 km^{2})
- Elevation: 25 ft (7.6 m)
- Time zone: UTC-5 (Eastern (EST))
  - Summer (DST): UTC-4 (EDT)
- ZIP Code: 06880 (Westport)
- Area codes: 203/475
- FIPS code: 09-66770
- GNIS feature ID: 2805092

Saugatuck is a census-designated place (CDP) in the town of Westport, Connecticut, United States. It is in the southwest part of the town, on both sides of the Saugatuck River, extending south to where it enters Long Island Sound. North of Interstate 95, it occupies just the west side of the Saugatuck and continues north as far as U.S. Route 1 (Post Road). It is bordered to the north by Westport Village (the town center) and to the west by the city of Norwalk. The CDP includes the communities of Owenoke and Saugatuck Shores, as well as the Metro-North Railroad Westport station.

As of the 2020 census, Saugatuck had a population of 2,937.

Saugatuck was first listed as a CDP prior to the 2020 census.

== Demographics ==
=== 2020 census ===
As of the 2020 census, Saugatuck had a population of 2,937. The median age was 46.2 years. 22.0% of residents were under the age of 18 and 18.8% of residents were 65 years of age or older. For every 100 females there were 93.5 males, and for every 100 females age 18 and over there were 92.9 males age 18 and over.

100.0% of residents lived in urban areas, while 0.0% lived in rural areas.

There were 1,154 households in Saugatuck, of which 28.0% had children under the age of 18 living in them. Of all households, 50.1% were married-couple households, 19.1% were households with a male householder and no spouse or partner present, and 25.4% were households with a female householder and no spouse or partner present. About 30.5% of all households were made up of individuals and 12.2% had someone living alone who was 65 years of age or older.

There were 1,286 housing units, of which 10.3% were vacant. The homeowner vacancy rate was 1.1% and the rental vacancy rate was 6.8%.

Racial composition as of the 2020 census
Race	Number	Percent
White	2,404	81.9%
Black or African American	79	2.7%
American Indian and Alaska Native	5	0.2%
Asian	165	5.6%
Native Hawaiian and Other Pacific Islander	0	0.0%
Some other race	67	2.3%
Two or more races	217	7.4%
Hispanic or Latino (of any race)	208	7.1%
