= Raymond E. Baldwin Bridge =

Bridge in Connecticut, US

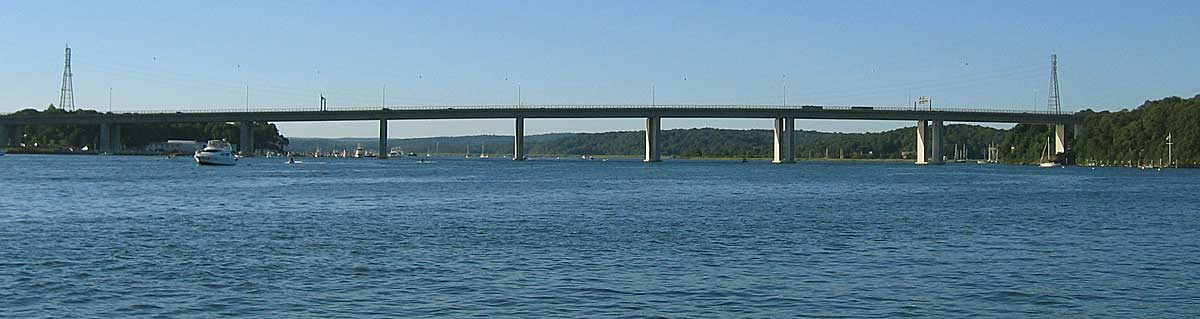
- The Baldwin Bridge in August 2007
- Coordinates: 41°19′09″N 72°20′51″W
- Carries: 8 lanes of I-95 / US 1
- Crosses: Connecticut River
- Locale: Old Saybrook, Connecticut and Old Lyme, Connecticut
- Maintained by: ConnDOT

Characteristics
- Design: Segmental box girder
- Total length: 2,530.8 feet (771.4 m)
- Width: 71.85 feet (21.90 m)
- Clearance below: 81 feet (25 m)

History
- Opened: 1948 (rebuilt 1993)

Statistics
- Daily traffic: 84,000

Location
- Interactive map of Raymond E. Baldwin Bridge

The Raymond E. Baldwin Bridge is a concrete segmental bridge composed of eleven spans crossing the Connecticut River between Old Saybrook, Connecticut and Old Lyme, Connecticut. The bridge carries Interstate 95 and U.S. Route 1, with an average daily traffic of 82,500 vehicles.

The bridge carries eight lanes of Interstate 95 and US 1 traffic, four in each direction. In addition, there is a bike/pedestrian walkway on the north side of the bridge adjacent to the southbound lanes.

== History ==
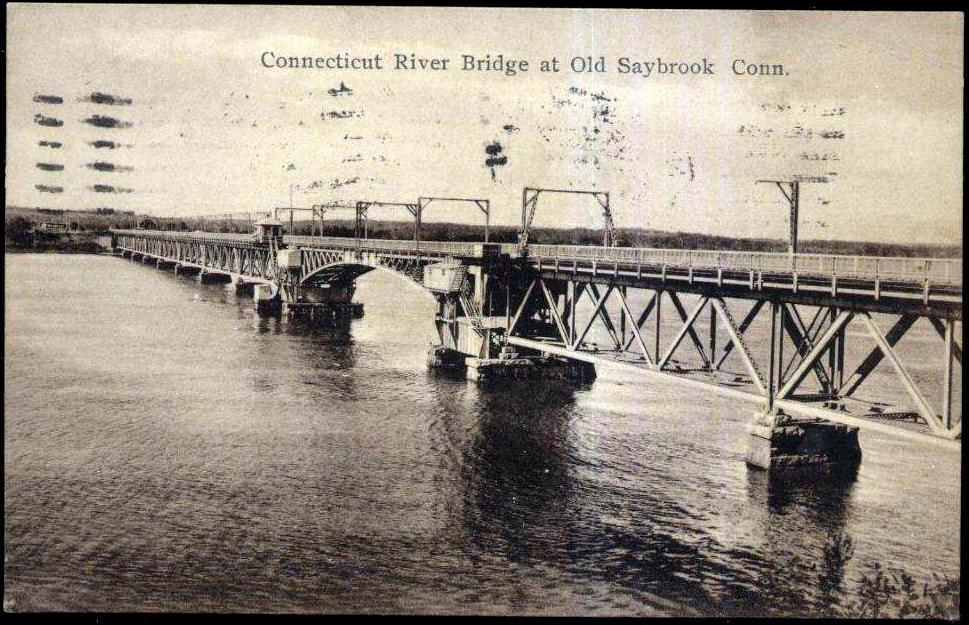
Postcard view of the first bridge

There have been three bridges on this site. Prior to the construction of the first bridge here, a ferry was used for the crossing, with the ferry landing located farther downstream. The first bridge was a double-bascule span completed in 1911. The New London and East Lyme Street Railway ran over the bridge from 1913 to 1919.

The second bridge opened in 1948 with a 4-lane girder and floorbeam bridge. The bridge collected tolls until their removal in the late 1980s. The third and current bridge was built by a joint venture of Perini - PCL - O&G. Construction of the bridge began in 1990 and was completed in 1993 with a total cost of $460 million. The 1948-bridge was demolished in 1994.

The bridge is named after former Connecticut Governor Raymond E. Baldwin, who was governor from 1939 to 1941 and again from 1943 to 1946.

== See also ==
- List of crossings of the Connecticut River
