= Connecticut Route 162 =

State highway in New Haven County, Connecticut, US

Route 162
- Map of New Haven County in southern Connecticut with Route 162 highlighted in red

Route information
- Maintained by CTDOT
- Length: 10.34 mi (16.64 km)
- Existed: 1932 (extended in 1966)–present

Major junctions
- West end: US 1 in Milford
- I-95 in West Haven
- East end: US 1 in Orange

Location
- Country: United States
- State: Connecticut
- Counties: New Haven

Highway system
- Connecticut State Highway System; Interstate; US; State; SSR; SR; Scenic
← Route 161	→ Route 163

Route 162 is a state highway in southern Connecticut running for 10.34 miles (16.64 km) from Milford to the West Haven–Orange town line. Because it is located along the Atlantic coast it serves as a more scenic alternate route to U.S. Route 1 (US 1), where it both begins and ends.

== Route description ==
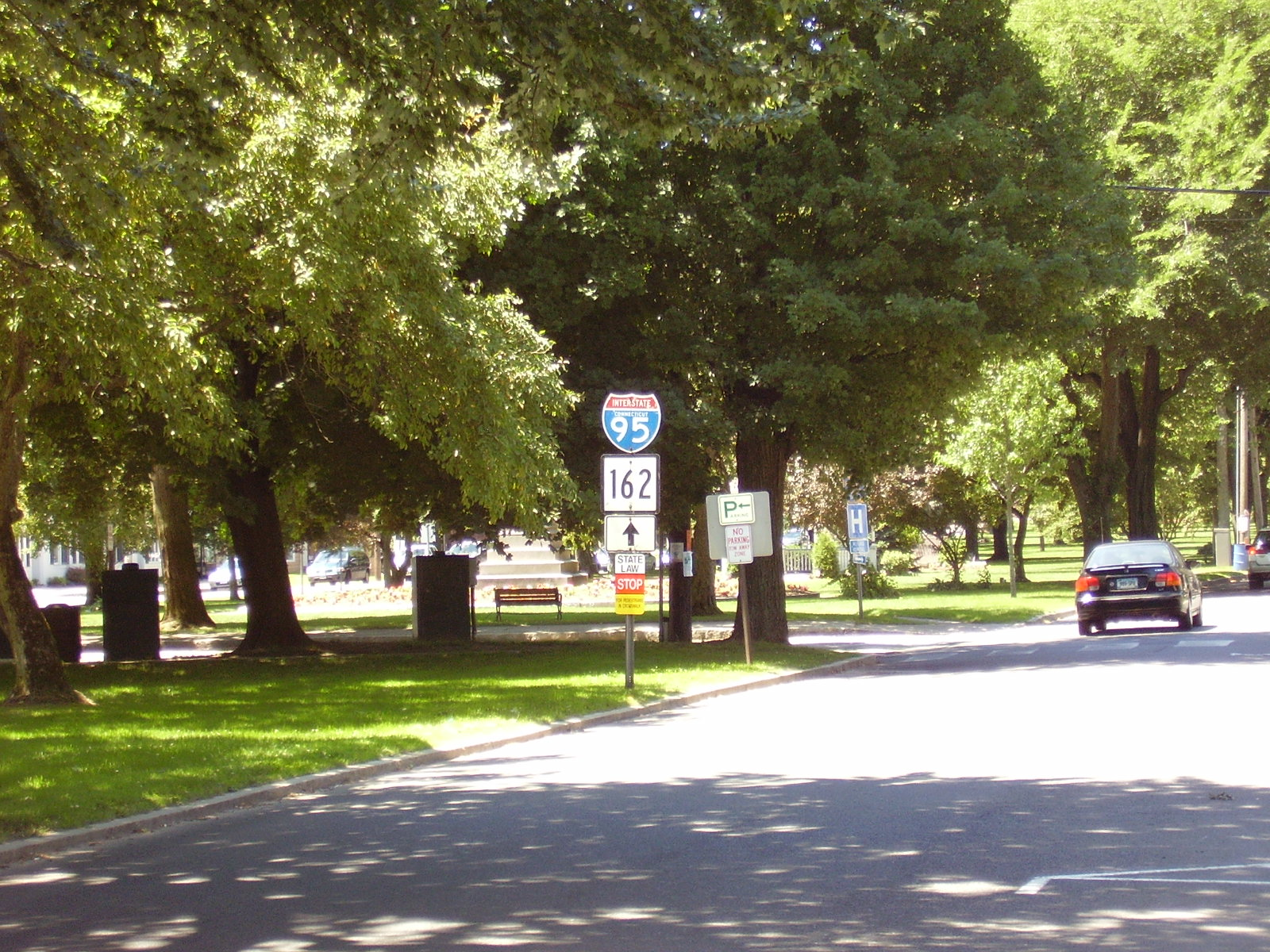
Westbound Route 162 at the historic Milford Green

The western terminus of Route 162 is in Milford, where its name is South Broad Street, and from which it tracks east. After passing through Downtown Milford, the name changes to New Haven Avenue. Just northeast of the West Haven town line, it becomes Jones Hill Road. A little over two miles (3.2 km) farther to the northeast, it becomes Platt Avenue. Less than a mile farther, it becomes Main Street for just 1,000 feet (300 m). Following Main Street northeast, a driver would then have to turn left onto Wagner Place in order to remain on Route 162. Wagner Place becomes Sawmill Road, which curves left and backtracks to the southwest, meeting Interstate 95 (I-95). After about one mile (1.6 km), a driver would encounter a curve right, at which point the name changes again to Bull Hill Lane. Bull Hill Lane continues to the northwest, crossing the Orange town line and ending at (US 1) after less than a mile.

== History ==
Route 162 was created in the 1932 state highway renumbering as a five-mile (8.0 km) road from US 1 near the Orange–West Haven line to the junction between Jones Hill Road and Ocean Avenue near the Milford–West Haven line. The portion in Milford was originally numbered as part of Route 122. This segment was removed from Route 122 and reassigned to an extended Route 162 in 1966.

== Junction list ==
The entire route is in New Haven County.

Location	mi	km	Destinations	Notes
Milford	0.00	0.00	US 1 (Boston Post Road) – Stratford, Orange	Western terminus
Milford	0.74	1.19	Seaside Avenue (SR 737 south)	
Milford	1.94	3.12	Buckingham Avenue (SR 736 east)	
Milford	4.50	7.24	Merwin Avenue (SR 736 west)	
West Haven	5.32	8.56	Ocean Avenue (SR 705 north)	Roundabout
West Haven	7.43	11.96	Ocean Avenue (SR 705 south)	
West Haven	8.97	14.44	I-95 – New Haven, New York City	Exit 43 on I-95
Orange	10.34	16.64	US 1 (Boston Post Road) – Milford, New Haven	Eastern terminus
1.000 mi = 1.609 km; 1.000 km = 0.621 mi
