= Lieutenant River =

River in Connecticut

Coordinates: 41.3265°N 72.3292°W

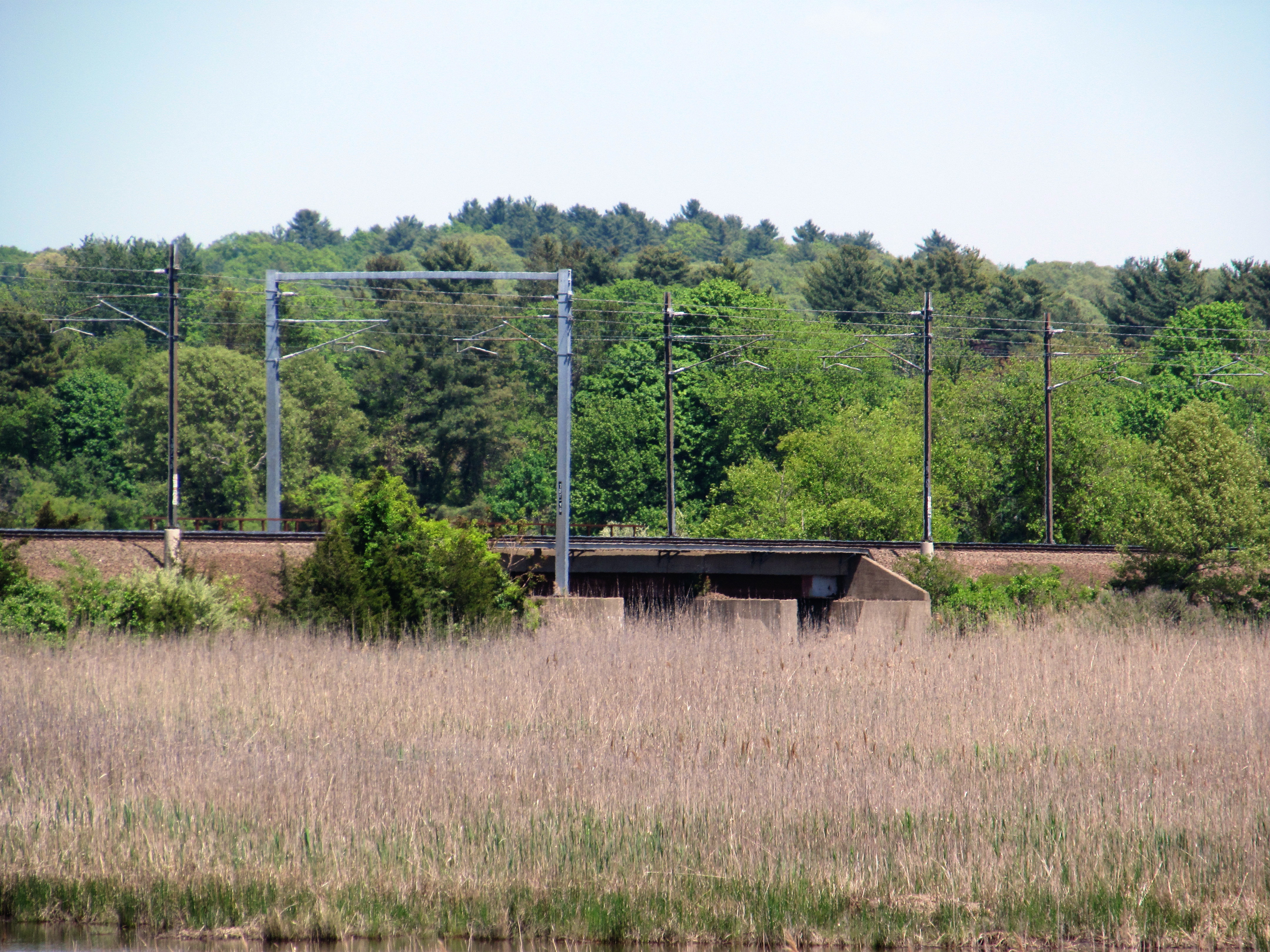
The rail bridge carrying the Northeast Corridor over the Lieutenant River

The Lieutenant River is a 3.7-mile-long (6.0 km) tidal river located in Old Lyme, Connecticut. It joins the Connecticut River in the estuary, just above the point where that river flows into Long Island Sound.

The Lieutenant River is named after Lieutenant John Griswold, a significant historical figure in the Old Lyme, Connecticut area. Lieutenant Griswold was a captain in the 11th Connecticut Infantry during the American Civil War.

The river has a public boat launch and is a popular fishing spot.

The Lieutenant River is popular among artists and photographers. A number of American impressionist artists, including Childe Hassam, painted views of the river while staying at the Florence Griswold House in Old Lyme.

The Florence Griswold Museum was designed with windows that have sweeping views of the Lieutenant River.

== Historic sites ==
- Lieutenant River No. 2 Lieutenant River III Site; Lieutenant River IV Site
- U.S. National Register of Historic Places
- Location within Connecticut
- Nearest city: Old Lyme, Connecticut
- Area: less than one acre
- MPS: Lower Connecticut River Valley Woodland Period Archaeological TR
- NRHP reference No.: 87001226, 87001227, 87001228
- Added to NRHP: July 31, 1987

There are three historic archeological sites associated with the Lieutenant River on the National Register of Historic Places:

- Lieutenant River No. 2
- Lieutenant River III Site
- Lieutenant River IV Site

== See also ==
- List of rivers of Connecticut
