= Connecticut Route 85 =

State highway in east-central Connecticut, US

Route 85
- Map of eastern Connecticut with Route 85 highlighted in red

Route information
- Maintained by CTDOT
- Length: 37.38 mi (60.16 km)
- Existed: 1932–present

Major junctions
- South end: US 1 in New London
- I-95 in Waterford; I-395 in Waterford; Route 2 in Colchester; I-384 in Bolton
- North end: US 6 / US 44 in Bolton

Location
- Country: United States
- State: Connecticut
- Counties: New London, Tolland

Highway system
- Connecticut State Highway System; Interstate; US; State; SSR; SR; Scenic
← I-84	→ Route 87

Route 85 is a north–south state highway in the east-central portion of the U.S. state of Connecticut linking the city of New London to the town of Bolton.

The section of Route 85 between Route 82 in Salem and Interstate 95 (I-95) in Waterford is a major thoroughfare that serves traffic between the Hartford and New London areas. This section travels through what is known as the Route 11 Corridor, named for the unfinished expressway that was to run parallel to Route 85 in this area. Currently, the Route 11 expressway ends abruptly in Salem, and all traffic is forced to exit and directed onto Route 85 (via Route 82).

== Route description ==
Route 85 begins as a four-lane urban arterial road at U.S. Route 1 (US 1) in New London, with junctions with I-95 and I-395 in Waterford. Route 85 continues north through the towns of Montville and Salem as a 2-lane rural arterial road up to the junction with Route 82. The road continues further north into the towns of Colchester, Hebron, and Bolton as a collector road (with arterial sections near the Route 2 and Route 16 junctions). There is a brief concurrency with Route 16 in Colchester. Route 85 ends in Bolton at US 6 and US 44 with a partial interchange with I-384 just before its terminus.

== History ==
The section of Route 85 south of Colchester can be traced to the 19th century Hartford and New London Turnpike (also called Governor's Road) This portion of the former turnpike was designated as State Highway 102 in 1922, when state highways were first signed in Connecticut. The northward continuation from Colchester to Hebron was assigned as State Highway 366. Modern Route 85 was established in the 1932 state highway renumbering from old Highways 102 and 366, with an extension north via Bolton center to Route 83 in Manchester (using Campmeeting Road and Charter Oak Street). In 1950, the northern terminus was moved to its current location at US 6 (along former SR 807). The northern terminus was moved back to its original location in 1954, then shifted again to its current location in 1963. The original northern end became SR 534.

== Junction list ==
County	Location	mi	km	Destinations	Notes
New London	New London	0.00	0.00	US 1 – New London, Waterford	Southern terminus
New London	Waterford	0.98	1.58	I-95 – New London, New Haven	Exit 91 on I-95
New London	Waterford	3.50	5.63	I-395 – Norwich, New Haven	Exit 2 on I-395; former Route 52
New London	Montville	6.96	11.20	Route 161 south – Flanders, Niantic	Northern terminus of Route 161
New London	Salem	11.27	18.14	Route 82 – East Haddam, Norwich	Roundabout
New London	Colchester	17.90	28.81	To Route 2 east / Route 11 south / Route 354 – Norwich, New London, Salem	Access via SR 637
New London	Colchester	18.02	29.00	Route 2 west – Hartford	
New London	Colchester	18.24	29.35	Route 354 south – Salem	Northern terminus of Route 354
New London	Colchester	18.96	30.51	Norwich Avenue (SR 616 east)	
New London	Colchester	19.04	30.64	Route 16 west – East Hampton	Southern end of Route 16 concurrency
New London	Colchester	19.11	30.75	Route 16 east – Lebanon	Northern end of Route 16 concurrency
New London	Colchester	19.38	31.19	Broadway (SR 615 west)	
Tolland	Hebron	23.71	38.16	Route 207 east – Lebanon	Western terminus of Route 207
Tolland	Hebron	25.52	41.07	Route 66 – Columbia, Marlborough	
Tolland	Hebron	30.27	48.71	Route 94 west – Glastonbury	Eastern terminus of Route 94
Tolland	Hebron	32.08	51.63	London Road (SR 603 east)	
Tolland	Bolton	35.04	56.39	Camp Meeting Road (SR 534 west) – Manchester	
Tolland	Bolton	36.97	59.50	I-384 west – East Hartford	Exit 7 on I-384 east
Tolland	Bolton	37.38	60.16	US 6 / US 44 / Cidermill Road (SR 533 north) – Manchester, Coventry, Andover	Northern terminus
1.000 mi = 1.609 km; 1.000 km = 0.621 mi: Concurrency terminus
