= U.S. Route 1 in Connecticut =

Highway in Connecticut

U.S. Route 1

Route information
- Maintained by CTDOT
- Length: 117.37 mi (188.89 km)
- Existed: 1926–present

Major junctions
- South end: US 1 at the New York state line in Port Chester, NY
- US 7 in Norwalk; Route 8 / Route 25 in Bridgeport; Milford Parkway in Milford; Route 9 in Old Saybrook; I-95 / Route 32 / SR 635 / Eugene O'Neill Drive in New London
- North end: US 1 at the Rhode Island state line in Westerly, RI

Location
- Country: United States
- State: Connecticut
- Counties: Fairfield, New Haven, Middlesex, New London

Highway system
- United States Numbered Highway System; List; Special; Divided; Connecticut State Highway System; Interstate; US; State; SSR; SR; Scenic
← I-691	→ Route 2

U.S. Route 1 (US 1) in the U.S. state of Connecticut is a major east–west U.S. Route along Long Island Sound. It has been replaced by Interstate 95 (I-95) as a through route, which it closely parallels, and now primarily serves as a local business route. Despite its largely east–west orientation, it is part of a north–south route and is mostly signed north–south.

Most of US 1 through Connecticut encompasses its predecessor, the Boston Post Road, and, in many towns, it is still named Boston Post Road (or Post Road).

== Route description ==
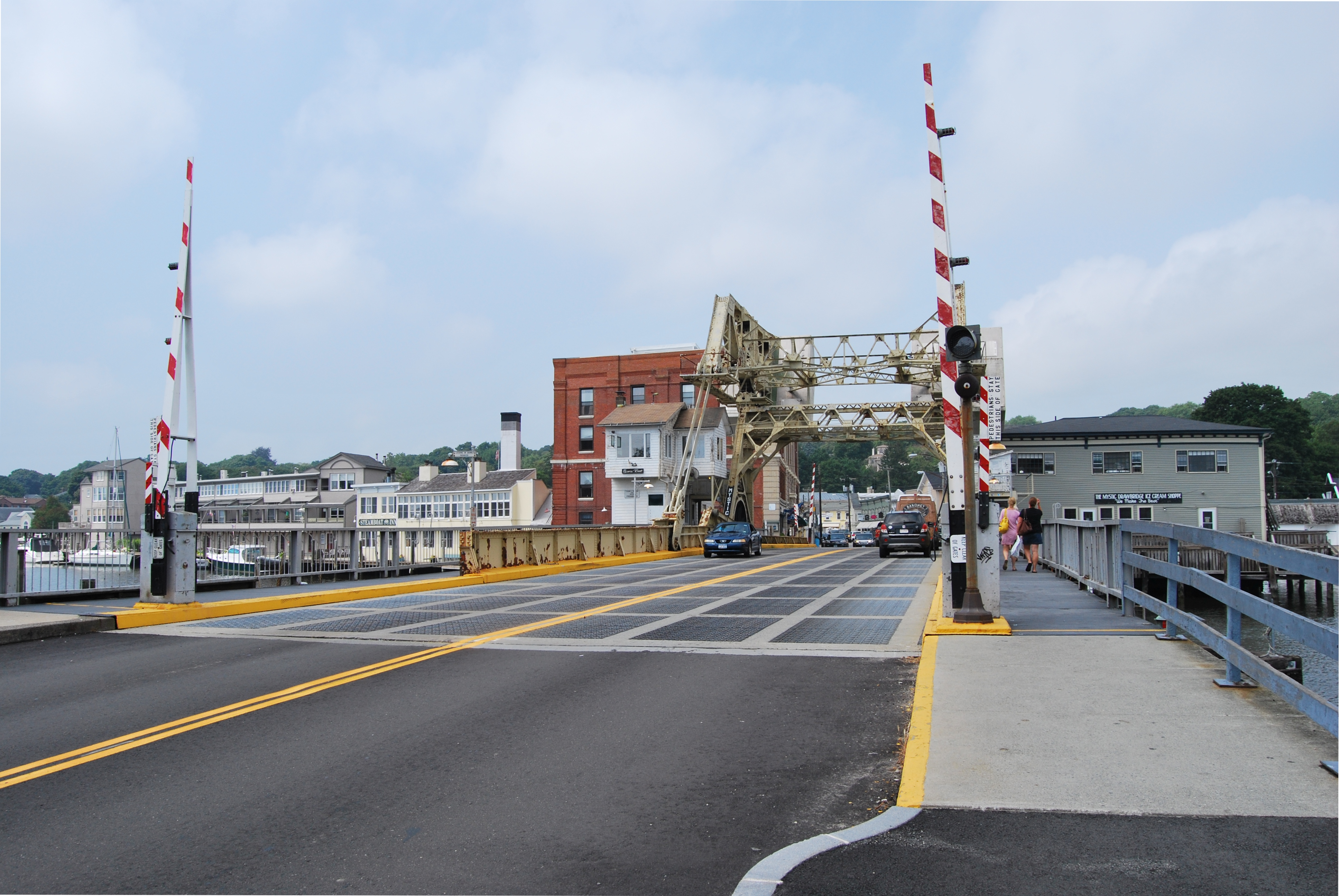
The Mystic River Bascule Bridge carrying US 1 over the Mystic River in Connecticut

US 1 in Connecticut largely parallels I-95 and has many interchanges with it. The route passes through each city and town of Connecticut bordering the Long Island Sound (in addition to the town of Orange).

From Greenwich to Branford, US 1 is mostly a four- or six-lane principal arterial road (with some two-lane sections in dense areas). From Branford to Stonington, US 1 it a two- or four-lane minor arterial road.

US 1 is known as Boston Post Road or Post Road for the majority of its length, but it also encompasses other local street names. The route is known as Putnam Avenue in Greenwich; Tresser Boulevard, West Main Street, and East Main Street in Stamford; Connecticut Avenue in parts of Norwalk; Boston Avenue in parts of Bridgeport; and New London Road in parts of Groton. In Stonington, the route is known as Stonington Road, South Broad Street, and West Broad Street. US 1 is also known as Main Street in Branford and Clinton.

Two sections of US 1 have been designated as scenic roads by the state of Connecticut. A 2.34 mile section in Madison between Neck Road and Lover's Lane (designated in 2008) and a 0.96 mile section in Old Lyme between the Lieutenant River and Griswold Avenue (designated in 2012).

=== Overlap with I-95 ===
US 1 is concurrent with I-95 in two sections, both of which are river crossings. The western concurrency is between exits 68 and 70 from Old Saybrook to Old Lyme, where the two routes cross the Connecticut River via the Raymond E. Baldwin Bridge. The eastern concurrency is between exits 83 and 85 from New London to Groton, where the routes cross the Thames River via the Gold Star Memorial Bridge.

US 1's two other major bridge crossings closely parallel the I-95 crossings of those rivers. The Washington Bridge over the Housatonic River, connecting Milford and Stratford, as well as the Tomlinson Lift Bridge over the Quinnipiac River in New Haven, are a short distance away from I-95's Moses Wheeler and Pearl Harbor Memorial bridges, respectively.

US 1 also forms a frontage road for I-95 in parts of Fairfield, Stratford, and New London.

== History ==
US 1 generally follows the old Boston Post Road and turnpike roads built to replace it. Specifically, the Greenwich Road, chartered in 1792, was the part in Greenwich and became part of the longer New York-to-Fairfield Connecticut Turnpike (not to be confused with the contemporary Connecticut Turnpike) in 1806. The New Haven and Milford Turnpike (1802) continued from Milford to New Haven, and the New London and Lyme Turnpike (1807) connected Old Lyme with New London.

=== Route 51 ===
Route 51
- Location: Old Lyme to East Lyme
- Length: 9.4 mi (15.1 km)
- Existed: 1962–1976

US 1 was originally built where it currently exists in Old Lyme and East Lyme. However, from 1949 to 1976, US 1 existed where I-95 currently exists in Old Lyme and East Lyme. From 1962 to 1976, this stretch of road was Route 51, which traveled for 9.4 miles (15.1 km) through Old Lyme and East Lyme and was known as the Boston Post Road. In 1976, US 1 returned to the 9.4-mile (15.1 km) stretch of road, thus eliminating the need for Route 51.

== Major intersections ==
County	Location	mi	km	Destinations	Notes
Byram River		0.00	0.00	US 1 south to NY 120A	Continuation into New York
Fairfield	Riverside	4.83	7.77	I-95 – New Haven, New York City	Exit 5 on I-95
Fairfield	Stamford	6.93	11.15	Route 137 north (Washington Boulevard) to Route 15 / Merritt Parkway / I-95 – Transportation Center, UConn	Southern terminus of Route 137; access to I-95 via SSR 493
Fairfield	Stamford	8.60– 8.66	13.84– 13.94	Route 106 north (Courtland Avenue) / I-95 – Glenbrook, New York City, New Haven	Southern terminus of Route 106; exit 9 on I-95
Fairfield	Community of Darien	11.17	17.98	I-95 – New Haven, New York City	Exit 11 on I-95
Fairfield	Community of Darien	11.56	18.60	Route 136 north (Tokeneke Road) to I-95 south – Rowayton, South Norwalk, New York City	Western terminus of Route 136
Fairfield	Community of Darien	11.66	18.76	Route 124 north (Mansfield Avenue) – New Canaan	Southern terminus of Route 124
Fairfield	Town of Darien	12.51– 12.87	20.13– 20.71	I-95 – New Haven, New York City	Exit 13 on I-95
Fairfield	Norwalk	14.24	22.92	I-95 – New Haven, New York City	Exit 14 on I-95
Fairfield	Norwalk	15.69	25.25	Riverside Avenue (SR 809 north)	
Fairfield	Norwalk	15.73	25.31	US 7 to I-95 – New York City, Bridgeport, Danbury	Exit 1 on US 7
Fairfield	Norwalk	16.17	26.02	Route 123 north (Main Street) to US 7 north – New Canaan, Danbury	Southern terminus of Route 123
Fairfield	Norwalk	16.54	26.62	Route 53 north (East Avenue) to I-95	Southern terminus of Route 53
Fairfield	Community of Westport	19.22	30.93	Route 33 – Wilton, Saugatuck, Westport Station	
Fairfield	Community of Westport	19.83	31.91	Route 136 (Compo Road) – Easton, Saugatuck	
Fairfield	Town of Westport	20.80	33.47	Sherwood Island Connector (SSR 476 south) – Sherwood Island State Park	
Fairfield	Southport	23.31	37.51	I-95 – New York City, New Haven	Exits 23 and 23A on I-95
Fairfield	Fairfield	25.28	40.68	To I-95 south – New York City	Access via Round Hill Road
Fairfield	Fairfield	25.51	41.05	Route 135 north (North Benson Road)	Southern terminus of Route 135
Fairfield	Fairfield	25.83	41.57	Route 130 east (Post Road)	Western terminus of Route 130
Fairfield	Fairfield	26.23– 26.47	42.21– 42.60	I-95 – New Haven, New York City	Exit 25B on I-95
Fairfield	Fairfield	27.16	43.71	I-95 / Black Rock Turnpike (SR 732 north) – New Haven, New York City	Exit 26 on I-95
Fairfield	Fairfield	28.15	45.30	Route 58 north – Easton, Redding, Bethel	Southern terminus of Route 58
Fairfield	Bridgeport	28.68	46.16	Route 59 north – Easton, Upper Stepney	Southern terminus of Route 59
Fairfield	Bridgeport	30.36	48.86	Route 8 south / Route 25 south to I-95 – New Haven, New York City	Access via Lindley Street; exit 2A on Route 8 north/Route 25 north
Fairfield	Bridgeport	30.85	49.65	Route 8 / Route 25 to I-95 – Trumbull, Waterbury, New Haven, New York City	Access via SR 722; exit 2B on Route 8/Route 25
Fairfield	Bridgeport	31.43	50.58	Route 127 (East Main Street) – Trumbull	
Fairfield	Community of Stratford	34.03	54.77	Route 108 north (Nichols Avenue) – Trumbull, Huntington	Southern terminus of Route 108
Fairfield	Community of Stratford	34.20	55.04	Route 113 (Main Street) – Paradise Green, Shelton, Stratford Station	
Fairfield	Community of Stratford	34.86	56.10	Route 130 west – Bridgeport	Eastern terminus of Route 130
Fairfield	Community of Stratford	34.91– 35.09	56.18– 56.47	I-95 – New York City, New Haven	Exit 33 on I-95
Fairfield	Community of Stratford	34.91– 35.09	56.18– 56.47	Route 110 north (East Main Street) – Shelton	Southern terminus of Route 110
Fairfield	Housatonic River	35.27– 35.43	56.76– 57.02	Washington Bridge	
New Haven	Milford	36.31	58.44	I-95 – New Haven, New York City	Exit 35A on I-95
New Haven	Milford	37.33	60.08	Route 162 east – Downtown Milford	Western terminus of Route 162
New Haven	Milford	38.91	62.62	To Route 15 (Merritt Parkway / Wilbur Cross Parkway) – New York City, Hartford	Access via Milford Parkway north and Exits 1A and 1B on Milford Parkway south
New Haven	Milford	39.20	63.09	Route 121 north (North Street) – Orange	Southern terminus of Route 121
New Haven	Milford	40.01	64.39	I-95 – New Haven, New York City	Exits 39A and 39B on I-95
New Haven	Orange	42.25	67.99	Route 152 north (Orange Center Road) – Orange Center	Southern terminus of Route 152
New Haven	Orange	43.20	69.52	Route 114 north (Racebrook Road) – Woodbridge	Southern terminus of Route 114
New Haven	Orange	43.95	70.73	Route 162 west (Bull Hill Lane) – West Haven	Eastern terminus of Route 162
New Haven	West Haven	46.06	74.13	Route 122 (Campbell Avenue / Forest Road) – Downtown West Haven, Westville	
New Haven	New Haven	46.64	75.06	Route 10 (Ella T. Grasso Boulevard) to I-95 – City Point, Hamden	
New Haven	New Haven	48.25– 48.81	77.65– 78.55	To I-91 / I-95 – Hartford, New London, New York City	
New Haven	New Haven	49.23– 49.41	79.23– 79.52	Tomlinson Lift Bridge over the Quinnipiac River	
New Haven	New Haven	50.25	80.87	Route 337 east (Townsend Avenue) to I-95 south – Lighthouse Point, New York City	Western terminus of Route 337; access to I-95 south via SR 741; exit 48 on I-95 north; to Tweed New Haven Airport
New Haven	East Haven	50.65– 51.23	81.51– 82.45	I-95 – New London, New Haven	Exit 49 on I-95; Signed for Lighthouse Point southbound
New Haven	East Haven	51.32	82.59	To Route 100	Access via SSR 735
New Haven	East Haven	51.79	83.35	Route 142 east (Hemingway Avenue) – Momauguin	Western terminus of Route 142
New Haven	East Haven	52.06	83.78	Route 100 north (Main Street)	Southern terminus of Route 100
New Haven	Branford	53.85	86.66	Route 142 west (Short Beach Road) – Short Beach	Eastern terminus of Route 142
New Haven	Branford	53.96	86.84	To I-95 south – New York City	Access via SR 794
New Haven	Branford	54.06	87.00	Route 146 east (Main Street) – Stony Creek	Western terminus of Route 146
New Haven	Branford	54.81	88.21	To I-95 – New London, New Haven	Access via SR 740
New Haven	Branford	56.82	91.44	I-95 – New London, New Haven	Exit 55 on I-95
New Haven	Branford	57.06	91.83	Route 139 north (North Branford Road) – North Branford, Foxon	Southern terminus of Route 139
New Haven	Guilford	59.21	95.29	Route 22 west (Notch Hill Road) – North Branford, Foxon	Eastern terminus of Route 22
New Haven	Guilford	61.76	99.39	I-95 – New Haven, New London	Exit 59 on I-95
New Haven	Guilford	63.07	101.50	Route 77 (Church Street) – Guilford, North Guilford	
New Haven	Guilford	64.11	103.18	I-95 / Route 146 (Boston Street)	Access via Goose Lane; exit 61 on I-95
New Haven	Guilford	64.35	103.56	Route 146 west (Boston Street) – Guilford Center	Eastern terminus of Route 146
New Haven	Madison	67.85	109.19	Route 79 north (Durham Road) to I-95 – North Madison, Durham	
Middlesex	Clinton	71.67	115.34	Route 81 north (High Street) to I-95 – Killingworth, Middletown	
Middlesex	Clinton	72.52	116.71	Route 145 north (Old Post Road / Old Westbrook Road) to I-95 – Winthrop	
Middlesex	Westbrook	76.25	122.71	Route 153 north (Essex Road) to I-95 – Essex, Ivoryton	
Middlesex	Old Saybrook	78.19	125.83	Route 166 west (Spencer Plain Road) to I-95	
Middlesex	Old Saybrook	79.52	127.98	Route 154 north (Old Boston Post Road) – Shore Points, Cornfield Point, Knollwood Beach	Southern terminus of Route 154
Middlesex	Old Saybrook	80.52	129.58	Route 154 south (Main Street) – Shore Points, Saybrook Point	Southern end of Route 154 concurrency
Middlesex	Old Saybrook	80.95	130.28	Route 154 north (Middlesex Turnpike) to I-95 south – Essex, Haddam, New Haven	Northern end of Route 154 concurrency
Middlesex	Old Saybrook	81.98	131.93	I-95 north – New London	Southern end of I-95 concurrency; exit 77 on I-95 south
Middlesex	Old Saybrook			Route 9 north – Essex, Hartford	Southern terminus and Exits 1A and 1B on Route 9 south; exit 78 on I-95
Connecticut River		82.15– 82.63	132.21– 132.98	Raymond E. Baldwin Bridge	
New London	Old Lyme	82.86– 83.34	133.35– 134.12	I-95 north / Route 156 east (Shore Road) – New London	Northern end of I-95 concurrency; southern end of Route 156 concurrency; exit 79 on I-95; US 1 not signed southbound
New London	Old Lyme	83.53	134.43	Route 156 west (Neck Road) – Hamburg	Northern end of Route 156 concurrency
New London	East Lyme	92.46	148.80	Route 161 (Chesterfield Road / Flanders Road) – Chesterfield, Niantic	
New London	East Lyme	92.97	149.62	I-95 – New Haven, New London	Exits 88 and 88A on I-95
New London	Waterford	97.36	156.69	Route 156 west (Rope Ferry Road) – Flanders, Niantic	Eastern terminus of Route 156
New London	New London	98.70	158.84	Route 213 south (Ocean Avenue) – Harkness Memorial State Park	Northern terminus of Route 213
New London	New London	99.99	160.92	Route 85 north (Broad Street) – Waterford, Hartford	Southern terminus of Route 85
New London	New London	100.89	162.37	Route 32 north – Norwich, New London Waterfront District, State Pier, Hodges Square	US 1 acts as frontage roads for I-95; access to State Pier/Hodges Square via SR 635; access to Waterfront District via Eugene O'Neill Drive
New London	New London	101.03	162.59	I-95 south – New London	Southern end of I-95 concurrency; exit 93 on I-95 north
New London	Thames River	101.17– 102.26	162.82– 164.57	Gold Star Memorial Bridge	
New London	Groton	102.21– 102.95	164.49– 165.68	I-95 / Route 12 north / Route 184 east to Thames Street – Providence, New London, Gales Ferry	Northern end of I-95 concurrency; exit 94 on I-95; no southbound access to I-95 north/Thames Street; access to Thames Street via Bridge Street
New London	Groton	103.22	166.12	Route 349 to I-95 north – Providence	Exit 3A on Route 349
New London	Groton	105.00	168.98	South Road (SR 649 west)	
New London	Groton	105.55	169.87	Route 117 north (Newtown Road) to I-95 – Ledyard	Southern terminus of Route 117
New London	Groton	106.47	171.35	Route 215 east (Groton Long Point Road) – Groton Long Point	Western terminus of Route 215
New London	Groton	108.62	174.81	Allyn Street (SR 614 north)	
New London	Groton	108.98	175.39	Route 215 west (Water Street) – Groton Long Point, Noank	Eastern terminus of Route 215
New London	Mystic River	109.12	175.61	Mystic River Bascule Bridge	
New London	Stonington	109.67	176.50	Route 27 north (Denison Avenue) to I-95 – Old Mystic	Southern terminus of Route 27
New London	Stonington	112.48	181.02	US 1A north (North Water Street) – Stonington Borough	Southern terminus of US 1A
New London	Stonington	113.63	182.87	US 1A south (Elm Street) – Stonington Borough	Northern terminus of US 1A
New London	Stonington	116.78	187.94	Route 234 west (Pequot Trail) to I-95 – Old Mystic	Eastern terminus of Route 234
New London	Stonington	117.24	188.68	Route 2 west (Liberty Street) to I-95 – Norwich, Hartford	Eastern terminus of Route 2
New London	Stonington	117.37	188.89	US 1 north – Westerly	Continuation into Rhode Island
1.000 mi = 1.609 km; 1.000 km = 0.621 mi: Concurrency terminus; Incomplete access

U.S. Route 1
Previous state: New York	Connecticut	Next state: Rhode Island
