= Waterford (CDP), Connecticut =

Census-designated place in Connecticut, United States

Waterford, Connecticut
- Census-designated place
- Location within Connecticut Location within the United States
- Coordinates: 41°20′34″N 72°7′45″W
- Country: United States
- State: Connecticut
- County: New London
- Town: Waterford

Area
  - Total: 1.89 sq mi (4.90 km^{2})
  - Land: 1.89 sq mi (4.89 km^{2})
  - Water: 0.0039 sq mi (0.01 km^{2})
- Elevation: 55 ft (17 m)

Population (2010)
  - Total: 2,887
  - Density: 1,529/sq mi (590.5/km^{2})
- Time zone: UTC-5 (Eastern (EST))
  - Summer (DST): UTC-4 (EDT)
- ZIP Code: 06385
- Area codes: 860/959
- FIPS code: 09-80210
- GNIS feature ID: 2378344

Waterford is a census-designated place (CDP) that includes the primary village in the town of Waterford, located in New London County, Connecticut, United States. It is in the southeastern part of the town, bordered to the east by the city of New London. U.S. Route 1 (Boston Post Road) passes east–west through the community. As of the 2010 census, the CDP had a population of 2,887, out of 19,517 in the entire town of Waterford.

== Education ==
The census-designated place, along with the rest of Waterford Town, is in Waterford School District. Waterford High School is located in the CDP.
