= Frontage road =

Type of road

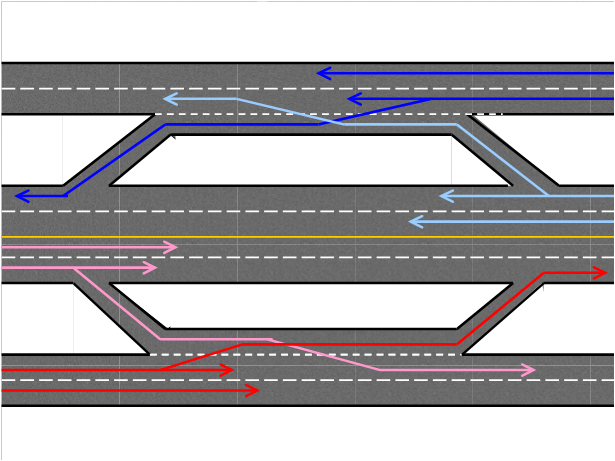
Illustration of a frontage road interchange. Traffic is permitted to move only in the direction indicated by the arrows.

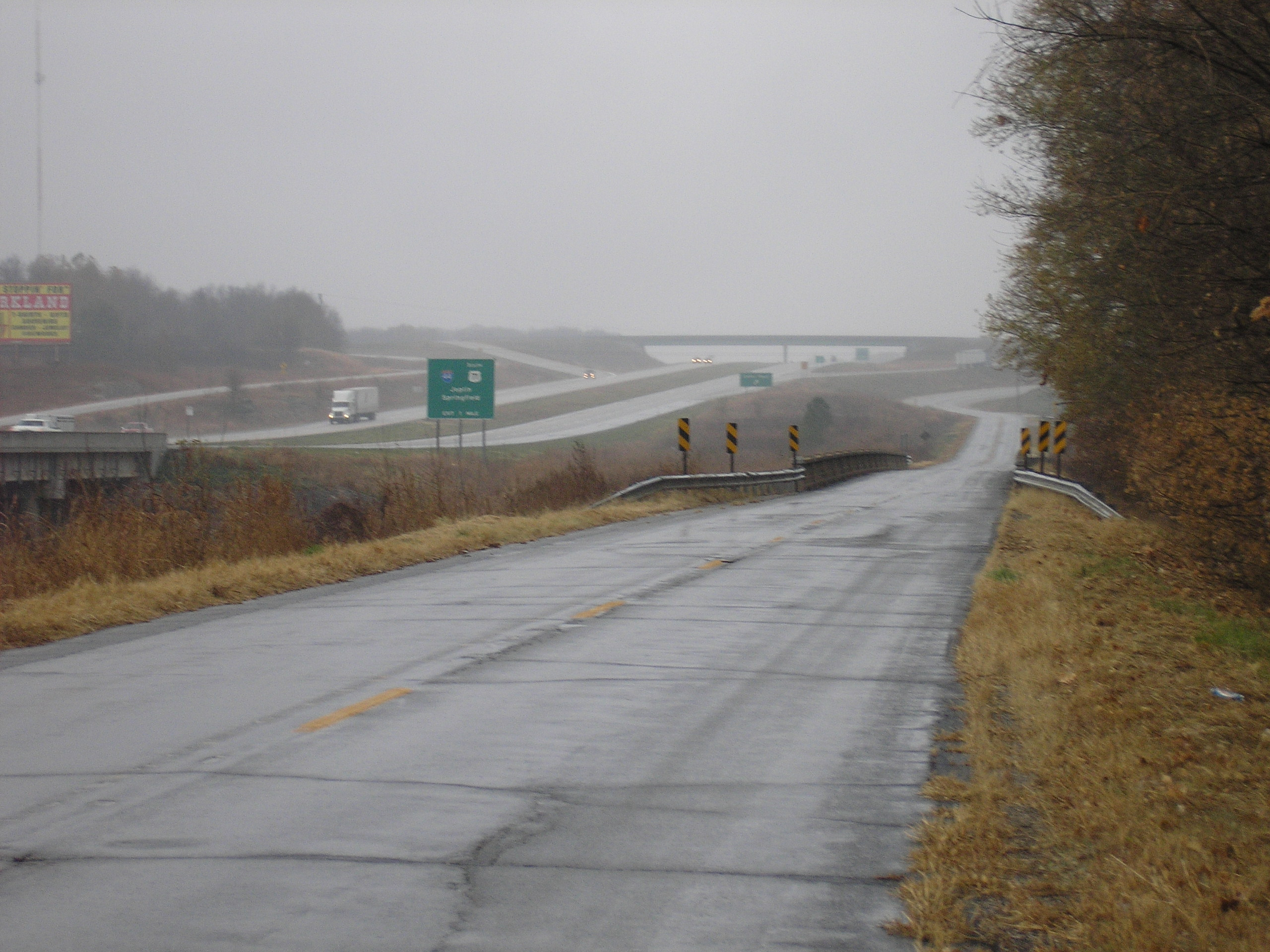
A frontage road for I-49/US 71 (a freeway) near Carthage, Missouri. The frontage road (called an "outer road" in Missouri) is former U.S. Route 71 Alternate.

A frontage road (also known as an access road, outer road, service road, feeder road, or parallel road) is a local road running parallel to a higher-speed, limited-access road. Where parallel high-speed roads are provided as part of a major highway, these are also known as local lanes. Sometimes a similar arrangement is used for city roads; for example, the collector portion of Commonwealth Avenue in Boston, U.S., is known as a carriage road.

A frontage road is often used to provide access to private driveways, shops, houses, industries or farms that would otherwise be cut off by a limited-access road. This can prevent the commercial disruption of an urban area that the freeway traverses or allow commercial development of bordering property.

== Advantages ==
A two-way residential frontage road (left) parallel to a busy major highway

There are several advantages to using frontage roads. One advantage is to separate local traffic from through traffic. When frontage roads are lacking in an urban area, the highway is used as a local road, reducing speeds and increasing congestion. Another advantage is to provide an alternative when the highway is closed or obstructed.

The existence of a frontage road can also be a catalyst for development, and property values along the highway often increase after the construction of frontage roads.

== Disadvantages ==
Freeflowing frontage road

There are also some disadvantages to using frontage roads. When frontage roads are used without controlling the access to the primary road, at every intersection where an intersecting road runs across the primary, the number of conflict points increases one fold for each frontage road, since each frontage road is itself another intersection. A highway with frontage roads can be difficult for pedestrians to cross, for a variety of reasons including, but not limited to when neither the primary road nor the crossing is elevated, or gaps in traffic are few and the intervals between those gaps is long. Such examples include:

- US 190 in East Baton Rouge Parish, Louisiana;
- LA 1 in West Baton Rouge Parish, Louisiana;
- Palatine Road in Cook County, Illinois;
- The northeast edge of Spur 503 in Denison, Texas;
- The Southeast edge of U.S. Route 69 in McAlester, Oklahoma.

A complex example is US 77/Commerce (34.1802°N 97.1430°W) in Ardmore, Oklahoma, particularly at the Grand Avenue intersection. Right turns from the central carriageways are not allowed; a slip ramp must be taken to the two-way frontage road, where the turning traffic must yield to the through traffic. Only then can a vehicle make a right turn from the signal on the frontage road.

Furthermore, frontage roads can increase urban sprawl. Land along highways is made open for development, allowing shopping centers and other buildings to sprawl.

Cost can also be a disadvantage, as building a highway with frontage roads can be more expensive than building a highway alone.

== Local–express lane system ==
A different alternative to the concept of frontage roads in urban freeways is the local–express system, which is designed to handle closely spaced interchange ramps without disrupting through traffic. Unlike frontage roads, the local lanes are typically high-speed fully controlled-access lanes, conforming to freeway requirements. These local lanes will run along the outside of the inner express lanes.

The outer lanes may also be known as a collector/distributor road where slip ramps provide access to and from the inner mainline lanes. This distinction is usually made when the outer lanes are only present by an interchange and not the full length of the highway.

For even more capacity, frontage roads may feed into and from freeway local lanes although this is less common.

== Related road types ==
A frontage lane is a paved path that is used for the transportation and travel from one street to another. The difference is that typically a frontage road will follow along the side of a highway, whereas a frontage lane is a short connection between two different roads. Frontage lanes, closely related to a frontage road, are common in metropolitan areas and in small rural towns. Frontage lanes are technically not classified as roads due to their purpose as a bridge from one road to another, and due to the architectural standards that they are not as wide as a standard road, or used as commonly as a standard road, street, or avenue.

A backage road is a similar concept to a frontage road, but lies on the back side of the land parcels that abut the controlled access's right of way. Like the frontage road, it serves mainly to provide access to those parcels as an alternative to a frontage road. Regardless of which direction the businesses face, the difference is that backage roads will be sandwiched between businesses and be separated from the freeway, whereas frontage roads will be right beside a freeway.

Some make a distinction between frontage roads and parallel roads. Frontage roads may more commonly refer to the one-way roads alongside a freeway, whereas parallel roads more commonly refer to the two-way roads running alongside a freeway.

== Examples ==
=== Argentina ===
In Argentina, especially around Buenos Aires, frontage roads known as colectoras can be found next to freeways. Examples include Avenida General Paz, Ruta 8, and Ruta 9 coming into Buenos Aires.

=== Canada ===
==== Alberta ====
Service or frontage roads feature in many parts of the highway network in Alberta, and are common along freeway-grade or twinned segments of major provincial highways such as Highways 1, 2 and 16, as well as some sections of major two-lane highways. Frontage roads are implemented along provincial highways as part of new construction, upgrading and twinning projects to ensure businesses or landowners along the highway right-of-way retain access to properties which would have direct access to the highway extinguished otherwise by the province.

In cities such as Edmonton and Calgary, frontage road schemes are implemented along freeways, expressways and some high-speed suburban arterial roads. Within Edmonton, one-way frontage roads run along parts of Whitemud Drive and the upgraded Yellowhead Trail for access to surface streets and businesses, and many arterial roads within the inner suburbs often have frontage roads to provide business and residential access away from faster through traffic. Access is usually through crossing streets, interchanges, or occasionally, ramps or direct connectors. In other urban areas, frontage roads are commonly built along a provincial highway through suburban areas to spur commercial development.

==== British Columbia ====
Bi-directional frontage roads exist both on the North and South sides of the Highway 1 through Abbotsford.

==== Ontario ====
A freeway with a significant remaining network of service roads is the Queen Elizabeth Way (QEW). However, most of the slip ramps between St. Catharines and Mississauga were removed during major reconstruction in the 1970s and 1990s. Service roads are no longer able to directly access the QEW; they have been rerouted to intersections with other major roads which have interchanges with the QEW. Nonetheless, the service roads are positioned too close to the QEW to easily widen the freeway unless all the private properties along the service road are bought out. This would be unlikely in the current political environment.

The only remaining slip ramps connecting to service roads are on the QEW running through St. Catharines. These dangerous low-standard ramps (due to lack of acceleration/deceleration lanes) are due to be replaced in a planned extensive reconstruction of the QEW that is currently underway. Similar service roads and slip ramps exist along Highway 401 through Oshawa, but like through St. Catharines, these are also in the process of being replaced with modern ramps.

Highway 427 had its service roads replaced with a collector-express system in the 1970s. However, it has several RIRO access onramps and offramps to serve residential traffic in addition to its standard parclo interchanges with major arterials.

A short section of Highway 400 has the service roads of Davis Road (southbound) and Wist Road (northbound) from South Canal Bank Road to Canal Road in King Township and Bradford West Gwillimbury. There is a RIRO interchange to the service roads, signed as to Canal Road, to access the farms of the Holland Marsh and the town of Bradford West Gwillimbury.

Although not considered a service road, Lake Shore Boulevard in downtown Toronto has several slip ramps that weave in and out of the parallel Gardiner Expressway, in a similar fashion as a service road.

List of service roads on the QEW:

- series of broken sections from Cawthra Road in Mississauga to the Garden City Skyway in St. Catharines

List of service roads on ON-400:

- Davis Road (southbound) and Wist Road (northbound), King and Bradford West Gwillimbury

List of service roads on ON-403:

- North Service Road at QEW/407 junction to Waterdown Rd, Burlington
- Service Road at Guelph Line, Burlington

List of RIRO intersections on ON-427:

- Gibbs Road onto Northbound 427
- Eva Road onto/off Southbound 427
- Holiday Drive onto/off Southbound 427
- Eringate Drive onto/off Southbound 427
- Valhalla Inn Road onto Northbound 427

==== Quebec ====
Many autoroutes in Greater Montreal (including the A-40, A-520, A-13, A-15 and A-25) maintain networks of frontage roads along at least some of their lengths as they pass through urban/developing areas.

=== India ===
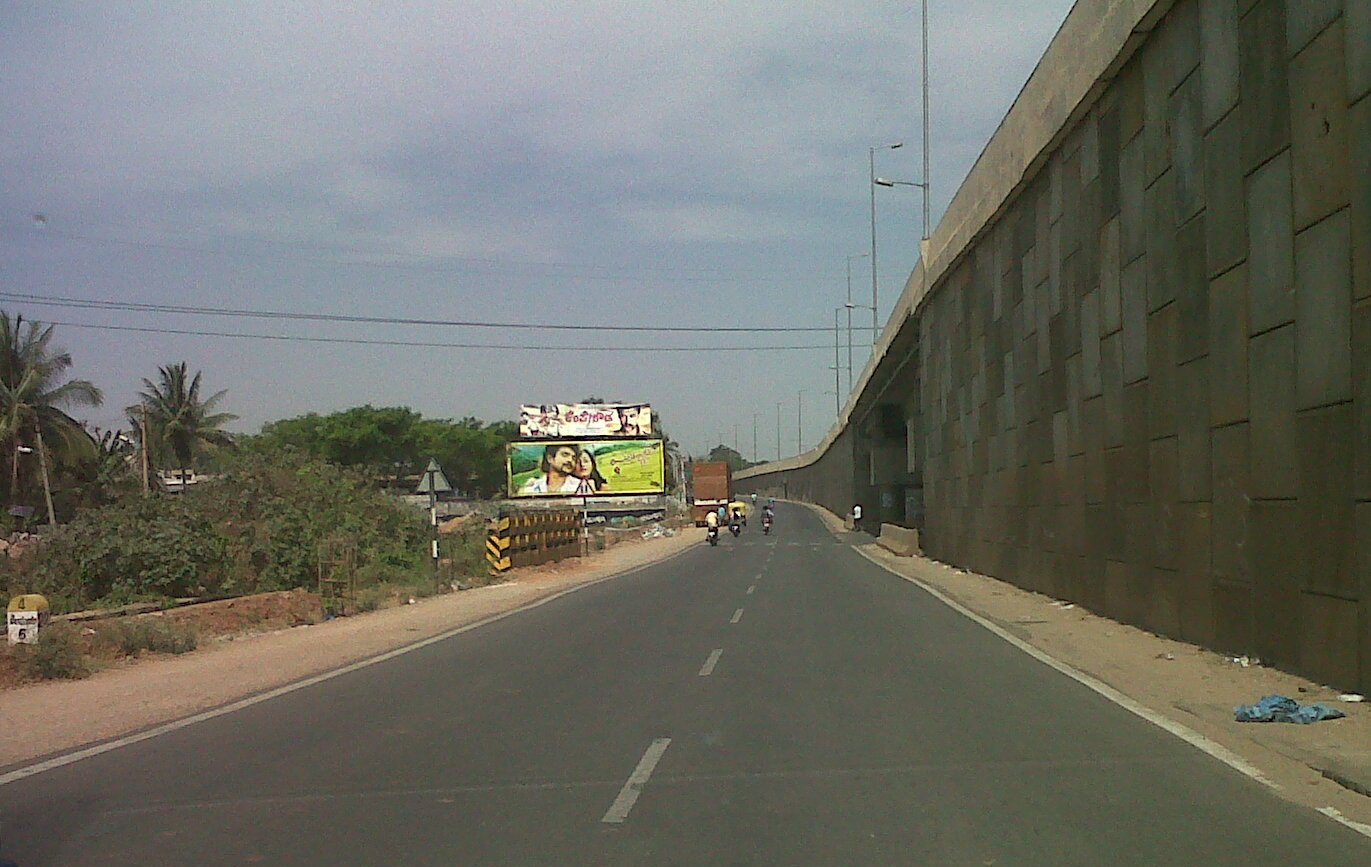
Service Lane on Bangalore elevated tollway on Tumkur Road, Bangalore.

In India, frontage roads or Service lanes (sometimes called नल्ला "Nullah" in Hindi) exist on most high density dual carriageway roads and dual carriageway highways. On Access controlled Expressways like the Yamuna Expressway, the frontage roads remain separate from the main carriageway throughout the road's length. Retrofitted and previously non-access controlled roads, such as most National Highways, only have service lanes on stretches where fly-overs (overpasses) are built over junctions or through towns.

=== Mexico ===
In Guadalajara, the López Mateos, Vallarta and Mariano Otero avenues (the latter in the stretch between López Mateos to Niños Héroes) are two-lane avenues surrounded by two one-way frontage roads. Lázaro Cárdenas Expressway is similar, but with three lanes in both the central road and the frontage roads. Because these frontage roads are considered as part of the avenue itself, the central road is known locally as the "central lanes", whereas the frontage roads are known as "lateral lanes". Turns are always forbidden in the central lanes; drivers wishing to make a turn must leave the central lanes and make the turn from the lateral lanes.

=== Netherlands ===
Frontage roads are common in the Netherlands and detailed in the Dutch national design manual for bicycle traffic as per pages 121 and 127 where they are referred to as parallel roads. In the Netherlands, engineers have used frontage roads to benefit cyclists as well as automobiles. Because frontage roads only carry local traffic, the speed on these roads is low (their speed limit is 30 km/h), making them an ideal environment for bicyclists. Because the speed and volume is so low, no additional treatments are needed to make a service road a safe bike facility. In the Netherlands, service roads are often linked together with bike paths to help create a comprehensive bicycle route, with the bike path links serving as barriers to through motor traffic. Since service roads serve a dual purpose, they are an inexpensive way to create routes in cycling network, compared to cycletracks or stand-alone bike paths. Extensive amounts of information on frontage roads can be found on Northeastern's webpage.

=== Mainland China ===
In the People's Republic of China mainland, roads running next to expressways, taking outgoing traffic and feeding incoming traffic, are referred to as service roads (Chinese: 辅路; pinyin: Fǔlù) or auxiliary roads (Chinese: 辅道; pinyin: Fǔdào). Where expressways cross larger urban areas, such frontage roads may run next to the expressway itself. Much of the Beijing portion of the Jingkai Expressway, for example, has, in fact, China National Highway 106 acting as a split-direction frontage road. Many newer urban highways are entirely elevated, with parallel access roads running beneath the entire length.

=== Philippines ===
The North Luzon Expressway (NLEX) maintains discontinuous two-way service roads that run along both sides of the expressway within Metro Manila and at Meycauayan in Bulacan, which extend from exits and merge into local roads.

The South Luzon Expressway (SLEX) has two two-way service roads running alongside the road within Metro Manila. Philippine National Railways (PNR) tracks and a section of the Metro Manila Skyway around Ninoy Aquino International Airport run between the expressway and its East Service Road between Nichols station and Bicutan station. The service roads begin at Sales Interchange at Pasay up until Alabang exit in Muntinlupa.

Outside the expressways, some of the wider major roads in Metro Manila feature service roads for business access. Roxas Boulevard features a service road to the east, running from Kalaw Avenue in Ermita, Manila to C. Rivera Street in Pasay. Ortigas Avenue in Greenhills, San Juan contains two one-way service roads, the eastbound one serving businesses at the avenue's south side, and the westbound one carrying local traffic at Greenhills. Quezon Avenue in Quezon City runs an eastbound one-way service road from Timog Avenue and East Avenue which crosses EDSA. Outside Metro Manila, service roads are implemented on some urban segment of major national roads such Maharlika Highway (Route 1) in Tagum, Davao del Norte and Benigno S. Aquino Jr. Avenue (Routes 5 and 512) in Iloilo City.

=== Hong Kong ===
Frontage roads exist both in city and along major expressways between new towns. Gloucester Road has frontage road running parallel of it from east to west. Cheung Tung Road serves as the frontage road for North Lantau Highway, Hiram's Highway for New Hiram's Highway, and Tai Wo Service Road West and Tai Wo Service Road East for Fanling Highway. Castle Peak Road serves the purpose as a frontage road of Tuen Mun Road to some extent.

=== United States ===
==== Alaska ====
Though Alaska has very few roads that are built to freeway standard, a couple of the highways that are do have frontage roads; notably along the Seward Highway (Alaska Route 1) with Homer Drive running south (from Tudor Road to Dimond Boulevard) and Brayton Drive running north (from DeArmoun Road to Tudor Road); and the Minnesota Drive Expressway (from West 100th Ave to Dimond Boulevard) in South Anchorage. Also, the George Parks Highway (Alaska Route 3) has two-way frontage roads running along it from the Trunk Road exit to the Seward Meridian Parkway exit (Fireweed Road on the south side and Blue Lupine Drive on the north side) in Wasilla.

==== Arizona ====
Frontage roads are not very common in Arizona but do exist along certain freeways.

In metropolitan Phoenix, the state's first freeway, Interstate 17 has a frontage road (Black Canyon Highway); some sections of the frontage road was reduced to a single lane in the 1990s when I-17 was widened. Several freeways overbuilt existing arterials, which were converted to frontage roads: Price Road (Tempe), Pima Road (Scottsdale) and Beardsley Road (north Phoenix) on the Loop 101, as well as 59th Avenue on the Loop 202 Ed Pastor (South Mountain) Freeway. In Tucson, I-10 has a two-lane, one-way frontage road, and in between Casa Grande and Tucson, a two-lane, two-way frontage road.

==== California ====
The East Shore Freeway, a wrong-way concurrency of 80 and 580 in Berkeley and Emeryville, is served by a frontage which retains the name of the previous road that ran through the corridor: the Eastshore Highway. It is also served by another frontage on the other side of the freeway: West Frontage Road.

Interstate 210 in California near Pasadena and Arcadia has frontage roads which include Corson Street in Pasadena (parallel to I-210 West) and Maple Street (parallel to I-210 East) in Pasadena, while Central Avenue (parallel to I-210 West) and Evergreen Avenue (parallel to I-210 East) are in Arcadia.

In Orange County, frontage roads exist on sections of these four highways:

- Interstate 5 (Santa Ana Freeway) between Anaheim Boulevard and State College Boulevard in Anaheim. The northbound frontage road is Anaheim Way and the southbound frontage road is Manchester Avenue.
- California State Highway 55 (Costa Mesa Freeway) from its southern terminus north of 19th Street up to Bristol Street in Costa Mesa Both the northbound and southbound frontage roads are signed as Newport Boulevard.
- California State Highway 73 (Corona del Mar Freeway) from Red Hill Avenue to Jamboree Road in Newport Beach. Both the northbound and southbound frontage roads are signed as Bristol Street.
- The expressway section of Jamboree Road from Edinger Avenue to the start of the SR 261 Toll Road in Irvine.

==== Connecticut ====
A short frontage road exists on Interstate 95 in New London just west of the Gold Star Memorial Bridge and the interchange with Connecticut Route 32, serving two shopping plazas and nearby suburbs. U.S. Route 1 also connects to the Interstate via this frontage road, at the western end of the concurrency of the two routes along the bridge. Other frontage roads existing along I-95 at the New Haven/East Haven city line, and along Interstate 91 north of Hartford.

==== Illinois ====
Frontage roads are common in Chicago, where they usually have the name of the street in its place had before the adjacent expressway was constructed. Parts of the Edens Expressway, the Dan Ryan Expressway, the Eisenhower Expressway, and the Kennedy Expressway use frontage roads. In addition, the stretches of Interstate 290 and the Elgin–O'Hare Expressway in Schaumburg have frontage roads.

==== Indiana ====
Interstate 69 between Indianapolis and Bloomington was built directly over State Road 37 between the two cities. Along that segment, frontage roads were constructed to provide local access. The old State Road 37 roadway makes up some of the I-69 frontage roads between Bloomington and Martinsville.

==== Massachusetts ====
Service roads are relatively uncommon in much of New England, and in Boston in particular, largely due to resistance to expressway construction, which necessitated scaled-back rights of way. Still, some unique examples of the type exist in the Rose Fitzgerald Kennedy Greenway Surface Road, Cross street, and Atlantic Avenue in downtown Boston. As a result of the Big Dig, the carriageways of these streets were re-aligned to function as a two-way service road system through downtown Boston with the Rose Kennedy Greenway park system as their 'median', and the expressway underground. In this special case of a service road, the subterranean I-93 Central Artery expressway is not visible from the surface, but accessible through access ramps into the tunnel system. Just south of downtown, I-93 also includes a short section at-grade service road between exits 16 in South Boston and the I-90 interchange south of Chinatown, in a more typical arrangement of the concept.

Typical service roads also exist along the eight-lane freeway section of Massachusetts Route 2 through Arlington and Belmont (two near northwestern suburbs of Boston) and United States Route 1 in Lynnfield.

In Fall River, from 1965 to 2023, Davol Street served as the frontage road for Massachusetts Route 79 between "Broadway Extended", Anawan and Pocasset Streets, Central Street, and Interstate 195 in the south, to Brightman Street in the north. For most of this stretch, Davol Street is split, with the Western Fall River Expressway (Route 79) running between a one-way pair of northbound North Davol Street and southbound South Davol Street. Until its closure in 2011, the Brightman Street Bridge carried U.S. Route 6 and Route 138 between Somerset and Fall River. At the eastern approach to the bridge, US 6 and MA 138 connected to MA 79, Brightman Street, and both sides of Davol Street at a complex interchange (to and from MA 79)/intersection (to and from US 6/MA 138, Brightman Street, and both sides of Davol Street). North of this interchange/intersection, both sides of Davol Street become the exit ramp from MA 79 southbound and entrance ramp to MA 79 northbound.

After the Veterans Memorial Bridge replaced the Brightman Street Bridge in 2011, this relocated US 6 and MA 138 onto a taller, expressway-like bridge with a large modified trumpet-style interchange with MA 79 and both sides of Davol Street. A new U-turn ramp from North Davol Street to South Davol Street and MA 79 southbound was added, along with a bike path along the bridge from Somerset and then south to Brightman Street. Brightman Street itself could only be accessed from North Davol Street; traffic from Brightman Street had to use local side streets to reach North Davol Street to access either direction of MA 79, US 6, and MA 138.

In 2015 and 2016, the Fall River Viaduct carrying MA 79 to its terminus at MA 138 and I-195 was demolished. When reconstruction was complete in 2016, Routes 79 and 138 were merged onto one boulevard-style Davol Street roadway with signaled intersections (at Central Street, Anawan and Pocasset Streets, and a new complex intersection with connections to I-195, Millikan Boulevard, and Ponta Delgada Boulevard/Water Street) from a partially-reconstructed partial interchange just south of Brownell Street.

By spring 2023, the Massachusetts Department of Transportation (MassDOT) had closed and started to remove some of the Route 79 expressway between the partial interchange from just south of Brownell Street at the southern end and the Veterans Memorial Bridge interchange at the northern end. All Route 79 traffic has been directed onto both sides of the Davol Street frontage road south of the Veterans Memorial Bridge interchange. Part of the 2011 Veterans Memorial Bridge interchange was closed or modified as well, most notably the ramp from US 6 eastbound/MA 138 southbound on the bridge to MA 79 southbound and the aforementioned U-turn ramp from North Davol Street to South Davol Street and Route 79 southbound (a temporary U-turn to the south has been built in its place for use during the construction period).

During re-construction of Davol Street as a boulevard, a temporary roadway will be built at-grade on the site of the former elevated expressway, with all traffic using it until the reconstructed halves of Davol Street are finished. Afterwards, the temporary roadway will be removed, with the land being slated for redevelopment, and all Route 79/138 traffic will return to North and South Davol Streets. By the completion of the project, the removal of the expressway will eliminate the frontage road status of North and South Davol Streets.

North and South Davol Streets carry US 6 from the Veterans Memorial Bridge (and before that, the Brightman Street Bridge) to President Avenue, where it turns east to cut through the city.

Between the mid-1960s and 2023, the status of Route 138 between "Broadway Extended" and either bridge to Somerset has been up for debate. Signs dating back to, and possibly prior to, the construction of the Fall River Viaduct (demolished 2015-2016) indicate that this stretch of Davol Street carries Route 138. Most signs from the mid-1960s indicate that MA 138 joins Route 79 from its southern end and leaves it at the ramps to either bridge to Somerset. However, some signs along President Avenue (US 6) and South Davol Street (and formerly also near the pre-2015 site of the split of Davol Street into the one-way pair) indicated that Route 138 still used the one-way pair of North and South Davol Streets. The elimination of the Route 79 expressway largely will end this decades-long debate, as North and South Davol Streets will carry all traffic (US 6 and Routes 79 and 138) from Central Street in the south to the Veterans Memorial Bridge in the north, where the Davol Street halves will re-join and serve as the transition to a new, permanent "southern end" of the truncated Western Fall River Expressway.

==== Michigan ====
Frontage roads are also common in Metro Detroit, where they are usually referred to as "service drives." As in Texas, they typically run one-way with frequent slip ramps to and from the limited-access roadway, with Texas U-turns at or near many intersections. Unlike Texas, there is usually little commercial development situated along the frontage road itself (see example); the road serves to provide access to the freeway from existing residential streets and commercial surface thoroughfares. Also unlike in many locales in urban Texas, where an exit ramp may actually precede the entrance ramp for the previous interchange to facilitate access to businesses situated directly on the frontage road (in effect, the two interchanges overlap along the frontage road), Michigan slip ramps to and from frontage roads are generally positioned as they normally would be in the absence of the frontage road. Motorists entering and exiting the freeway are not sharing the frontage road simultaneously to as large a degree, reducing weaving. Access to the frontage road between exits is provided by turnarounds and frequent bridging, generally every 1/2 mile, between exits.

Michigan left hand turns are also quite common at surface street-frontage road intersections, with dedicated turnaround lanes (similar to the Texas U-turn) built over the freeway on separate bridges approximately 100 meters from the main intersection and bridging.

With the exceptions of Interstate 275 and the freeway portion of M-53, every Metro Detroit freeway has a frontage road along it for at least a portion of its length. Several other freeways outside Metro Detroit use these as well.

There are two other cities in Michigan where frontage roads running more than one mile in length outside of Metro Detroit can be found. There are frontage roads along Interstate 496 and U.S. Route 127 in Greater Lansing and along Interstate 475 in Downtown Flint. Outside the cities, US-23 has them from Ann Arbor to Fenton, while US-127 has them from Leslie to Mason. New freeway construction in Michigan has not included frontage roads since the completion of Interstate 696, most of which was constructed along the rights of way of major surface arteries, in 1989. Michigan does not build frontage roads in rural areas.

==== Missouri ====
Missouri has built frontage roads, typically named "Outer Roads", along Interstate 44 (when it was designated as US 66) between Springfield and Greater St. Louis and along US 67 (not all of it up to freeway standards) between Festus and Poplar Bluff. Outer roads are also found on Interstate 64 in West St. Louis County, Interstate 270 in North St. Louis County, and Missouri Highway 367 between I-270 and Lindbergh Blvd.

==== Montana ====
Along Interstate 15, most rural sections of the former US 91 are still in service as frontage roads between Lima and Butte, Butte and Helena, Helena and Great Falls, and from Great Falls north to Shelby.

Some former sections of US 10 in the west (Saint Regis to Butte along Interstate 90) and east (Billings to North Dakota along Interstate 94) also serve as frontage roads.

==== New Jersey ====
While service roads are somewhat uncommon on most New Jersey highways, they do exist. In northern New Jersey, Route 3 has several service roads throughout much of its length, due in part to the heavy commercial development in the area. Notably, commuters will often use these service roads to get ahead of regular traffic back ups, often causing accidents which lead to the shut down of said service roads, defeating their purpose. Frontage Roads are also used on Route 24 in Short Hills where Route 124 serves as a service road for about 2 miles. The Garden State Parkway also has a service road in Irvington for a distance.

==== New York ====
One-way service roads on either sides of highways are relatively common in New York City and the surrounding areas. Due to the high urban density, this design allows rapid access on and off the highway while also providing a viable alternate route in the case of accidents and traffic. In the borough of Queens, the Van Wyck Expressway has this system implemented for most of its length. On Long Island, the Long Island Expressway (Interstate 495), has one-way service roads on each side of the expressway for most of its length from the Queens–Midtown Tunnel to Riverhead.

Upstate, frontage roads are less common. New York State Route 104 has frontage roads along its limited access portions in Irondequoit and Webster, and the Southern Tier Expressway (I-86) in Horseheads has two short frontage roads (Brickyard Lane and Fairport Lane) during its elevated expressway portion. These stretches of service roads have signalized intersections with main roadways, as well as RIRO-style intersections with tertiary roadways and larger commercial properties.

==== North and South Carolina ====
Service roads can be found alongside interstate highways in North Carolina and South Carolina. Some of these roads have houses facing the highways which they parallel. They may also have highway service, as most of them are located near interchanges. Most service roads in the Carolinas do not have ramps leading to and from their respective highways; rather, as mentioned before, most are located near interchanges, which allows people to exit the highway and go around to the frontage road if needed. Those service roads are also commonly used as roads for farms and their products.

==== Ohio ====
Significant stretches of frontage roads are found in and around Akron; Cleveland, where ones without prior names are called "marginal roads"; Cincinnati; and Downtown Youngstown.

==== Texas ====
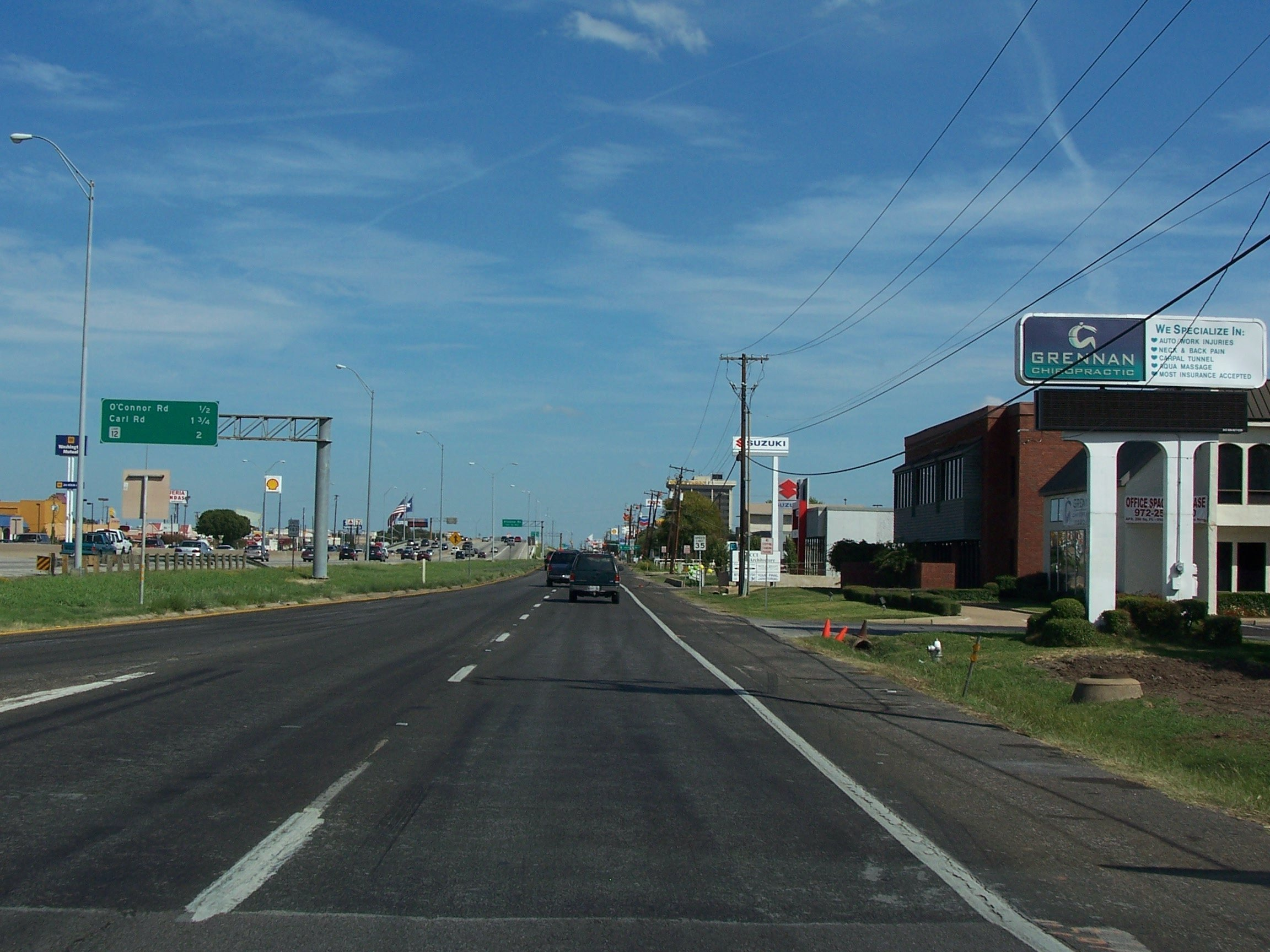
A frontage road for Texas State Highway 183 (Airport Freeway) in Irving, Texas

In 2007, the Texas state comptroller stated the state had built over 6,500 miles (10,500 km) of frontage roads. This was far more than any other state. The state government's tendency to construct frontage roads alongside major highways has been historically credited to chief highway engineer Dewitt Greer (1940–1968). He began building frontage roads as a measure to reduce right-of-way acquisition costs by ensuring access to new highways for affected landowners; otherwise, the state would have needed to pay them a higher price for cutting off access to their land.

Most Texas freeways have service roads on both sides. In urban and suburban areas, the traffic typically travels one-way, in the direction of the adjacent freeway. Most other areas have two-way traffic, but as an area urbanizes, the frontage road is often converted to one-way traffic (2 lanes). In cases of freeway congestion or shutdown, the frontage road provides an instant detour, subject to delays at each stop sign or stoplight at cross streets.

Where two new Texas freeways meet, especially on the edge of major metropolitan areas, the state will often first build the junctions for the one-way frontage roads—that is, four at-grade intersections—followed by an overpass where one freeway crosses over another. This requires motorists who desire to switch freeways to exit to the adjacent frontage road, turn at an at-grade intersection onto the frontage road for the other freeway, and then merge into the other freeway. As traffic increases at the at-grade intersections, the state slowly adds direct ramps between freeways for the most in-demand traffic movements, thereby reducing such inconvenience for motorists.

Over 80% of Houston freeways have service roads, which locals typically call feeders. Many service roads in urban and suburban areas of Texas have the convenience of Texas U-turns, as a left lane curving under an overpass, allowing drivers to avoid stopping for traffic lights when making a U-turn.

Service roads are often built as part of a multi-phase plan to construct new limited-access highways. They initially serve as a highway with access to local business before the freeway is constructed years later. After the completion of the freeway, frontage roads serve as a major thoroughfare for local activity, such as with the Katy Freeway project (I-10) in Greater Houston. In several cases, a long-range plan has called for a future freeway, but the design has either changed or the project was canceled before completion.

Nicknames for frontage roads vary within the state of Texas. In Houston and East Texas, they are called feeders. Dallas and Fort Worth area residents call their frontage roads "service roads", and "access roads" is the predominant term used in San Antonio. Most signs reference "Frontage Road" despite local regional vernacular (there are signs in Houston that use the term "feeder").

In Houston, the free sections of Beltway 8, SH 249 and FM 1093, not part of the Sam Houston Tollway, Tomball Tollway, and Fort Bend Westpark Tollway (respectively) are composed of frontage roads.

In 2002, the Texas Department of Transportation proposed to discontinue building frontage roads on new freeways, citing studies that suggest frontage roads increase congestion. However, this proposal was widely ridiculed and criticized and was dropped later the same year.

The Stemmons Freeway in Dallas illustrates the practicability of the frontage road: the real estate developer John Stemmons offered free land to the Texas Highway commission in which to build a freeway (Interstate 35E) on the condition that the state build the freeway with frontage roads that would give access to undeveloped property that he owned along the freeway corridor. The state was able to reduce its costs (largely the cost of land acquisition) of building the freeway, and didn't need to acquire and demolish developed property; the developer profited from development along the freeway. San Antonio developer Charles Martin Wender used the same tactic for his Westover Hills development, offering free land through the middle of his property for SH 151 as well as paying half the costs for the initial frontage road construction. Following Wender's lead, several neighboring landowners also donated right-of-way for the route.

==== Washington ====
Frontage roads are found in Spokane along a segment of Interstate 90 between its interchange with SR 290 and the exit for East Appleway Boulevard. West of South Havana Street, the westbound frontage road is East Second Avenue and the eastbound frontage road is East Third Avenue. East of South Havana Street, the westbound frontage road is East Third Avenue and the eastbound frontage road is East Fourth Avenue.
