= Connecticut Route 349 =

State highway in New London County, Connecticut, US

Route 349
- Clarence B. Sharp Highway
- Map of New London County in southeastern Connecticut with Route 349 highlighted in red

Route information
- Maintained by CTDOT
- Length: 4.17 mi (6.71 km)
- Existed: 1985–present

Major junctions
- South end: Shennecossett Road in Groton
- US 1 in Groton
- North end: I-95 in Groton

Location
- Country: United States
- State: Connecticut
- Counties: New London

Highway system
- Connecticut State Highway System; Interstate; US; State; SSR; SR; Scenic
← Route 343	→ Route 354

Route 349 begins as a limited-access spur from I-95 (at Exit 87) leading to the city of Groton. It has full interchanges with I-95 and US 1. The limited-access portion is 1.9 miles (3.1 km) long and is known as the Clarence B. Sharp Highway.

== Route description ==
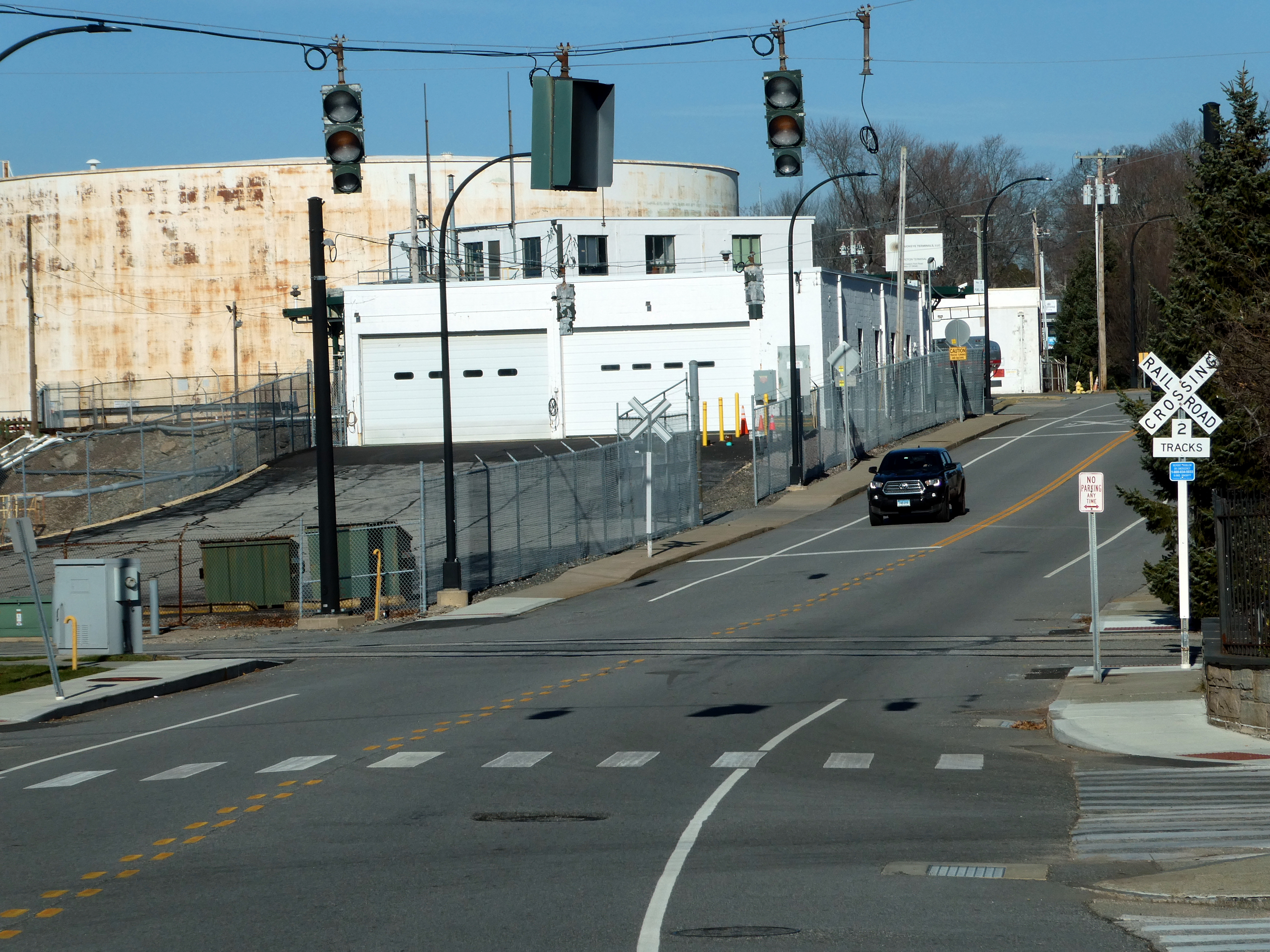
Eastern Point Road in 2023

Route 349 begins as a continuation of Shennecossett Road in southern Groton. It runs north as Eastern Point Road, parallel to the Thames River. The road passes through Shennecossett Golf Course and next to General Dynamics Electric Boat. It bears east on Rainville Avenue before turning north on Clarence B. Sharp Highway, a four-lane undivided expressway. After an at-grade intersection with Meridian Street, Route 349 becomes a four-lane divided freeway. Route 349 has an interchange with US 1 before terminating at a directional T interchange with I-95. The surface section of Route 349 from mile post 0.89 to the junction with SR 649 is also known as the "City Police Officer William J. Snyder, Sr. Memorial Highway".

== History ==
In the 1960s, Groton was a center of submarine manufacturing. An unsigned state highway, State Road 649, led from I-95's exit 85 to the industrial area. The many urban intersections through Groton center led to elevated traffic congestion. Because of this, a proposal to relocate SR 649 onto a new expressway arose. The expressway was completed in 1966, and SR 649 was relocated onto it. In 1985, part of SR 649 was re-designated as Route 349, and additionally included a portion of a road leading to Avery Point, resulting in the modern alignment and designation.

== Junction list ==
The entire route is in Groton, New London County.

mi	km	Exit	Destinations	Notes
0.00	0.00		Shennecossett Road	Continuation east
2.30	3.70		Rainville Avenue (SR 649 east)	
2.30	3.70	Southern end of limited-access section		
3.07	4.94	–	Meridian Street	At-grade intersection
3.58	5.76	3A	US 1 to Route 12 north – Downtown Groton, Groton Waterfront	Signed as exit 3 southbound; signed for Route 12 northbound, Groton Waterfront southbound
3.81	6.13	3B	I-95 south – New London	Northbound exit and southbound entrance; exit 96 on I-95
4.17	6.71	–	I-95 north – Providence	Northern terminus
1.000 mi = 1.609 km; 1.000 km = 0.621 mi
