= Hodges Square Historic District =

Historic district in Connecticut, United States

- U.S. National Register of Historic Places
- U.S. Historic district
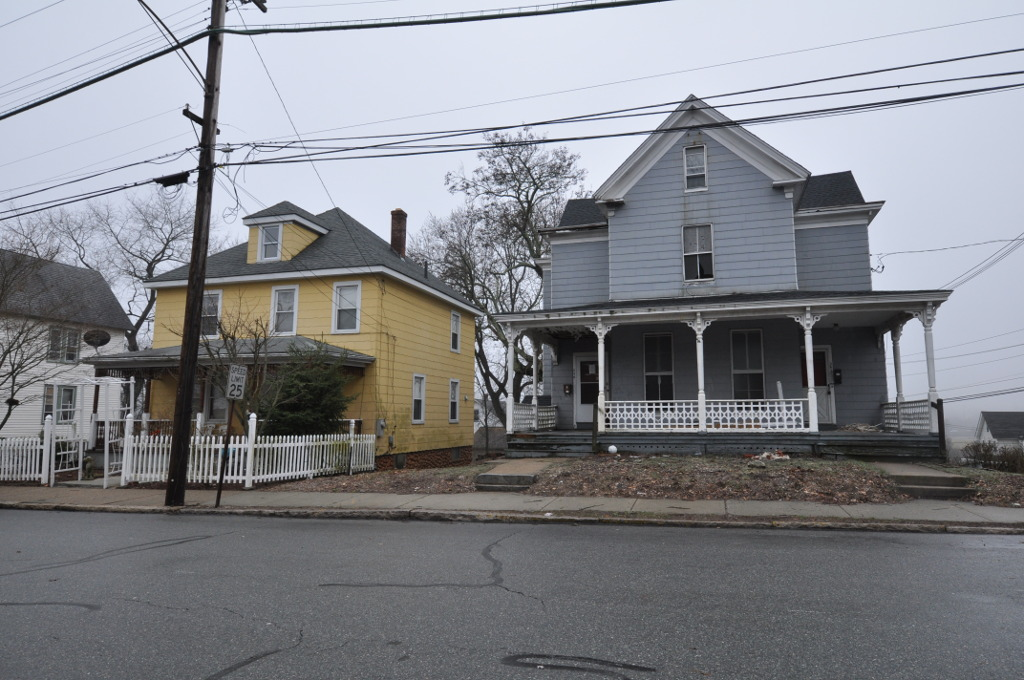
- Houses in the district in 2018

- Location within Connecticut Location within the United States
- Location: Bolles, Eastern, Central, Crystal & Terrace Avenues, Bragaw, Williams, Rosemary, Grove & Adelaide Streets, New London, Connecticut
- Coordinates: 41°21′58″N 72°6′1″W
- NRHP reference No.: 100001733
- Added to NRHP: October 10, 2017

The Hodges Square Historic District of New London, Connecticut encompasses a working-class residential area north of the city's central business district. It is located between the campus of the United States Coast Guard Academy and Interstate 95, and is bounded on the west by Williams Street and the east by the Thames River. This area developed as a modest working-class residential area in the mid-19th century, when New London's economy began shifting from one based on maritime pursuits to one based on manufacturing. The area's residents were typically employed in nearby silk manufacturing operations, or by the Central Vermont Railroad, which had a roundhouse and service yard nearby. Hodges Square, a small cluster of commercial buildings, forms the economic center of the neighborhood.

The district was listed on the National Register of Historic Places in 2017.

== See also ==
- National Register of Historic Places listings in New London County, Connecticut
