= Mohegan–Pequot Bridge =

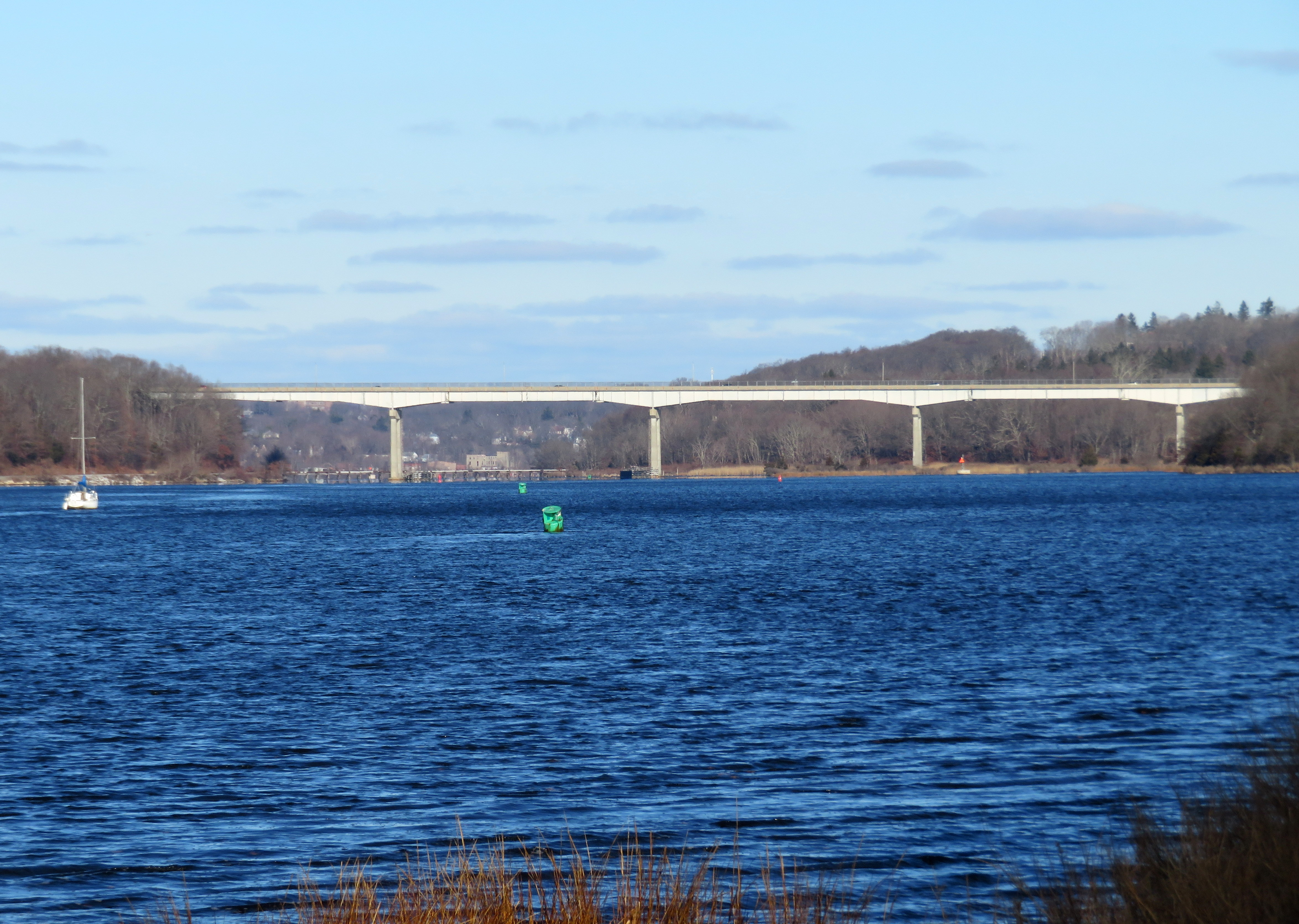
- Mohegan–Pequot Bridge in December 2018
- Coordinates: 41.4818°N 72.0748°W
- Carries: 2 lanes of Route 2A
- Crosses: Thames River
- Named for: Native American tribes of the local area
- Owner: CT DOT

Characteristics
- Design: Girder bridge
- Material: Steel
- Total length: 1,435 feet (437 m)
- Width: 2 lanes
- Height: 75 feet (23 m)

History
- Construction cost: $7.5 million
- Opened: 1 December 1967
- Rebuilt: 1996

Statistics
- Toll: 15¢ (December 1, 1967–1976); 25¢ (1976–October 1, 1980); None (October 1, 1980–present)

Location
- Interactive map of Mohegan–Pequot Bridge

The Mohegan–Pequot Bridge is a steel girder bridge in Montville and Preston, Connecticut that carries Route 2A over the Thames River. It was built in 1967 as a toll bridge, but the tolls were removed in 1980. The bridge is the northernmost crossing of the Thames River.
