= Yankee Doodle Bridge =

- Coordinates: 41.1075°N 73.4104°W
- Carries: 6 lanes of I-95
- Crosses: Norwalk River
- Locale: Norwalk

Location
- Interactive map of Yankee Doodle Bridge

The Yankee Doodle Bridge is a road bridge in Norwalk, Connecticut. Its primary purpose is carrying Interstate 95 (Connecticut Turnpike) over the Norwalk River, though it also features a pedestrian sidewalk.
