= Connecticut Route 2A =

State highway in New London County, Connecticut, US

Route 2A
- Map of New London County in southeastern Connecticut with Route 2A highlighted in red

Route information
- Maintained by CTDOT
- Length: 9.91 mi (15.95 km)
- Existed: 1967–present

Major junctions
- West end: I-395 / Route 2 / Route 32 in Norwich
- I-395 in Montville
- East end: Route 2 in Preston

Location
- Country: United States
- State: Connecticut
- Counties: New London

Highway system
- Connecticut State Highway System; Interstate; US; State; SSR; SR; Scenic
← Route 2	→ Route 3

Route 2A is a state highway in the U.S. state of Connecticut. It is a 9.9-mile (15.9 km) mostly freeway alternate route of Route 2 that bypasses the downtown area of the city of Norwich and serves as the main access road to the Mohegan Sun casino.

== Route description ==
Route 2A begins at the junction of I-395 and Route 2/Route 32 in Norwich. Route 2A travels south along I-395 for 3.7 miles (6.0 km) before separating as its own four-lane freeway at I-395 Exit 9 in Montville. It runs easterly for about 3.2 miles (5.1 km) with interchanges for Route 32 and Mohegan Sun Casino before becoming a two-lane freeway, after which it crosses the Thames River on the Mohegan-Pequot Bridge into Preston and ends at Route 12. After turning north onto Route 12 for a brief overlap, it resumes its easterly course, meeting with Route 117 in the village of Poquetanuck. From here, Routes 2A and 117 continue north as a concurrency to Route 2 where both routes end.

== History ==
When the highway and bridge opened in December 1967, motorists were charged a 15-cent toll. The toll plaza located at the west end of the Mohegan-Pequot Bridge was removed in 1980.

== Junction list ==
The Connecticut Department of Transportation announced in May 2013 that exit numbers on I-395 and Route 2A would be renumbered from the then-existing sequential-based system to mileage-based numbering; the numbers on I-395 were changed from June to November 2015, the Route 2A numbers by March 2016. The old exit numbers were posted above the new exit tab for the mile-based numbers until 2017.

The entire route is in New London County.

Location	mi	km	Old exit	New exit	Destinations	Notes
Norwich	0.00	0.00	–	–	I-395 north – Worcester	Continuation north; western end of I-395 concurrency; former Route 52 north
Norwich	0.24	0.39	81	13	Route 2 / Route 32 – Norwich, Hartford	Signed as exits 13B (west) and 13A (east) westbound; exits 36-37 on Route 2; no eastbound access to Route 2 west
Norwich	2.44	3.93	80	11	Route 82 – Downtown Norwich, Salem	
Montville	3.90	6.28	79A	9	I-395 south – New Haven, New York City	Eastern end of I-395 concurrency; exit number not signed westbound; former Route 52 south
Montville	5.30	8.53	1	5	Route 32 – Norwich, Uncasville	
Montville	6.39	10.28	2	6	Mohegan Sun Boulevard – Mohegan Reservation	To Mohegan Sun
Thames River	6.64	10.69	Mohegan–Pequot Bridge			
Preston	7.05	11.35	Eastern end of freeway section			
Preston	7.05	11.35			Route 12 south – Gales Ferry, Groton, New London	Western end of Route 12 concurrency
Preston	7.35	11.83			Route 12 north – Norwich	Eastern end of Route 12 concurrency
Preston	9.11	14.66			Route 117 south – Ledyard, Old Mystic	Western end of Route 117 concurrency
Preston	9.91	15.95			Route 2 – Norwich, North Stonington, Westerly, RI Route 117 ends	Eastern terminus; northern terminus of Route 117
1.000 mi = 1.609 km; 1.000 km = 0.621 mi: Concurrency terminus
