= P.T. Barnum Bridge =

Highway bridge in Bridgeport, Connecticut

Coordinates: 41.1774°N 73.1854°W

The P.T. Barnum Bridge is a highway bridge carrying Interstate 95 and the Connecticut Turnpike over the Pequonnock River in Bridgeport, Connecticut, United States. It was named after former Bridgeport mayor, and Connecticut politician P.T. Barnum.

There have been two bridges in the area. The first one was a girder-and-floorbeam bridge that carried six lanes of traffic but had no shoulders. It opened on January 2, 1958, along with the rest of the Connecticut Turnpike.

During the 1990s, Interstate 95 was reconstructed in the area, and as a result the P.T. Barnum Bridge was replaced. The replacement bridge opened in 2000 to eight lanes of traffic with full left and right shoulders.

On January 26, 2004, the bridge suffered minor damage when a tanker truck exploded while passing over. Repairs were originally expected to take at least two weeks, but the bridge re-opened after just a few days.
