= Gold Star Memorial Bridge =

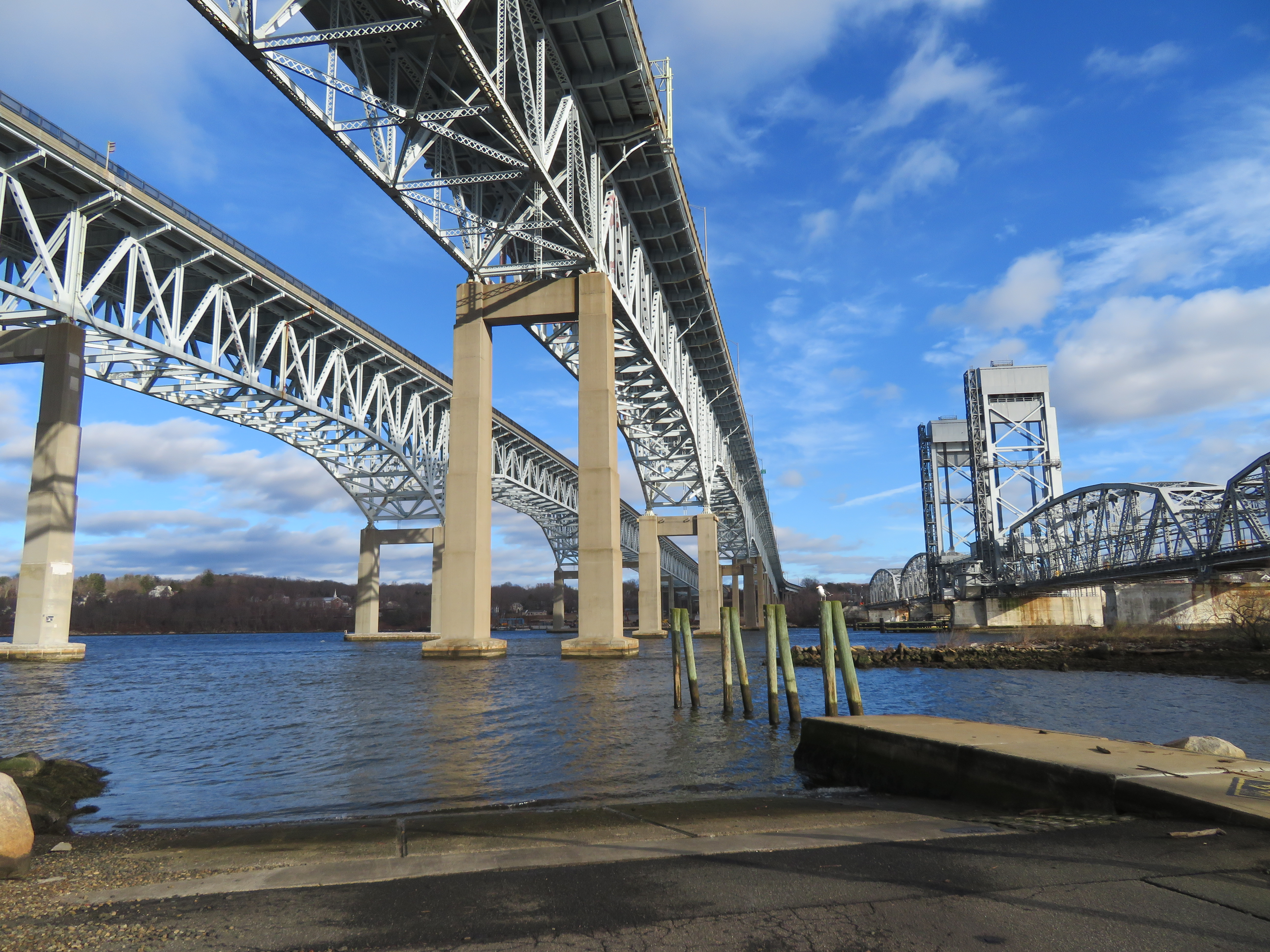
- The two spans of The Gold Star Memorial Bridge from the New London side
- Coordinates: 41°21′51″N 72°5′15″W
- Carries: 11 lanes of I-95 / US 1; bikes/pedestrians
- Crosses: Thames River
- Locale: New London, Connecticut and Groton, Connecticut
- Official name: Gold Star Memorial Bridge
- Maintained by: Connecticut Department of Transportation

Characteristics
- Design: Twin Truss - Deck
- Total length: 1,807.8 m (5,931 ft 1 1/4 in) / 1,941 m (6,368 ft 1 3/8 in)
- Width: 24.4 m (80 ft 5/8 in) / 24.4 m (80 ft 5/8 in)
- Clearance below: 41.1 m (134 ft 10 1/8 in)

History
- Opened: 1943 south span 1973 north span (twinned)

Location
- Interactive map of Gold Star Memorial Bridge

The Gold Star Memorial Bridge is a pair of steel truss bridges that carry both Interstate 95 and U.S. Route 1 across the Thames River between New London, Connecticut and Groton, Connecticut. The bridge is the largest structure in the state, with more than 1,000,000 sq ft (93,000 m^{2}) of deck area, and the longest bridge in the state at 6,000 feet (1,829 m). Its 11 highway lanes accommodate an average daily traffic of 117,000 vehicles. The bridge is actually a set of twin bridges, but they are generally spoken of using the singular "bridge".

== History ==
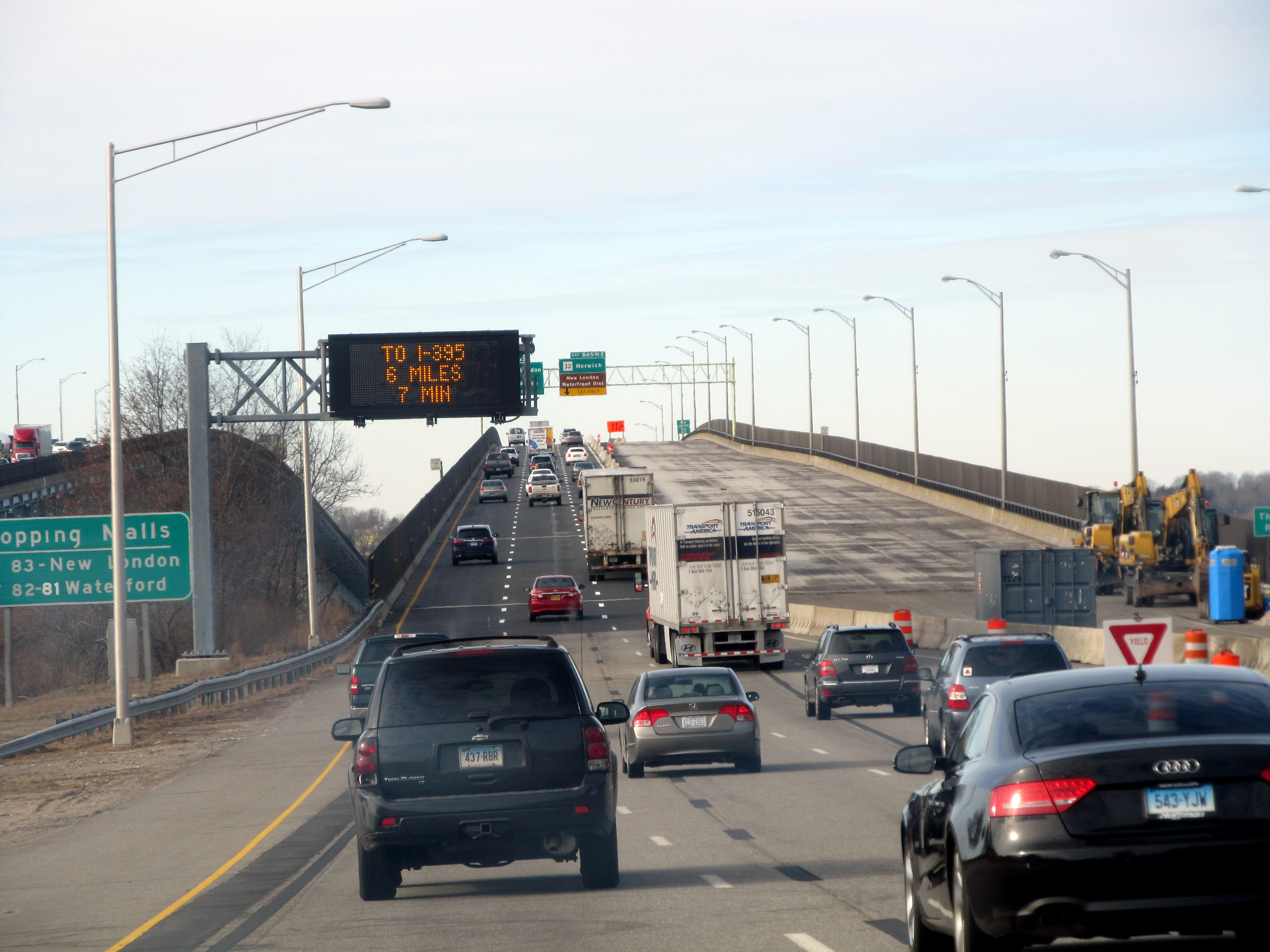
Traffic diversion during resurfacing and repair work on the southbound span in 2017

The current south span (northbound) of the bridge was started in 1941 and completed in 1943 as a single span carrying traffic in both directions. It was part of Southeastern Connecticut's "free span" highway, a short 3.6-mile (5.8 km) long four-lane stretch connecting New London to Groton, Connecticut. As part of the new highway, the bridge's purpose was to remove automobiles from a previous bridge that carried U.S. Route 1 over the Thames River. In 1951, the bridge was designated as the Gold Star Memorial Bridge in honor of members of the Armed Forces from Groton, New London, and Waterford who lost their lives during World War I, World War II, and the Korean War.

In 1958, the Route 1 bypass containing the Gold Star Bridge was connected to the Connecticut Turnpike by extending west to what is today the interchange of Interstates 95 and 395 in East Lyme. East of the bridge, a 13-mile (21 km) bypass of Route 184 was completed to the Rhode Island border on December 12, 1964, officially making the bridge and both bypasses part of Interstate 95. The stretch of I-95 containing the bridge is known as the Jewish War Veterans Memorial Highway.

On July 1, 1972, during construction of the north span, the masts of the US Coast Guard Academy's USCGC Eagle (WIX-327) caught the safety netting slung below the new bridge. The upper portions of two of the masts were snapped off. The ship had to undergo emergency repairs as a result.

The bridge's second (north) span was opened on June 13, 1973. The original span was closed for reconstruction on June 28, 1973; it reopened on December 16, 1975, with four lanes of northbound traffic. The northbound span underwent an emergency bearing replacement in 2014.

=== 2023 fire ===
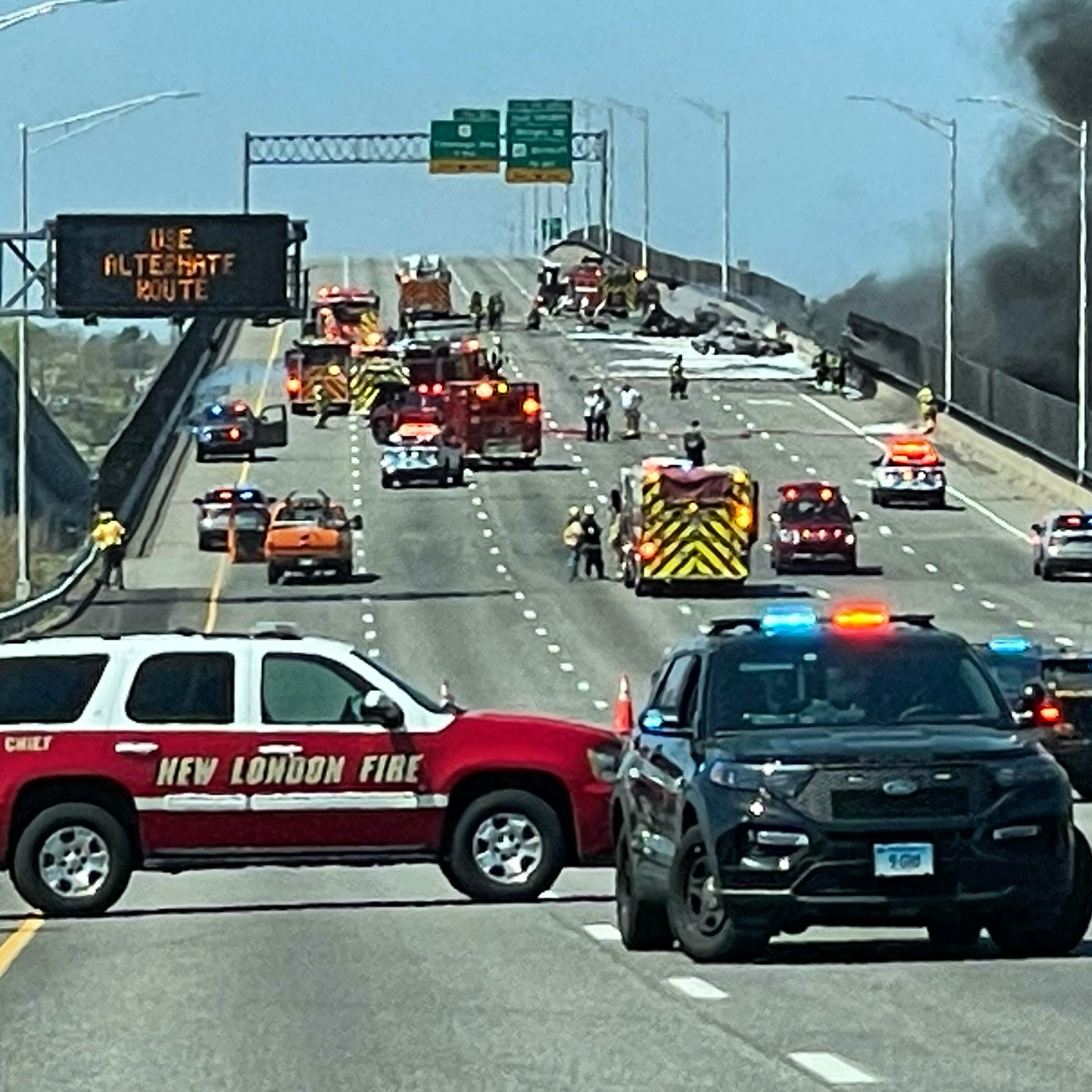
Emergency responders at the scene of the April 2023 fire

On April 21, 2023 a truck carrying heating oil collided with a vehicle on the southbound bridge, killing the driver of the oil truck and injuring at least two others. The crash dumped approximately 2,200 gallons of oil onto the bridge which caught fire. Initially, authorities believed that the fire spread to buildings below the bridge, but they later stated that it only spread to adjacent brush. Following the crash, the Connecticut Department of Transportation shut down the southbound bridge to traffic, waiting for engineers to confirm the bridge's structural integrity. It reopened to automobile traffic later that day. The pedestrian/cyclist section of the bridge remained closed, giving those users no way to cross the Thames River. It took 23 days of this closure before shuttle service was provided to pedestrians and cyclists.

== Design ==
The design is a pair of steel cantilever bridges, each composed of eleven spans.

The posted traffic speed limit is 55 miles per hour (89 km/h).

The newer southbound (north) span has a sidewalk/bike path on the north side of the bridge, accessible from Bridge Street and Riverview Avenue on the Groton side and Williams Street on the New London side.

== Gallery ==
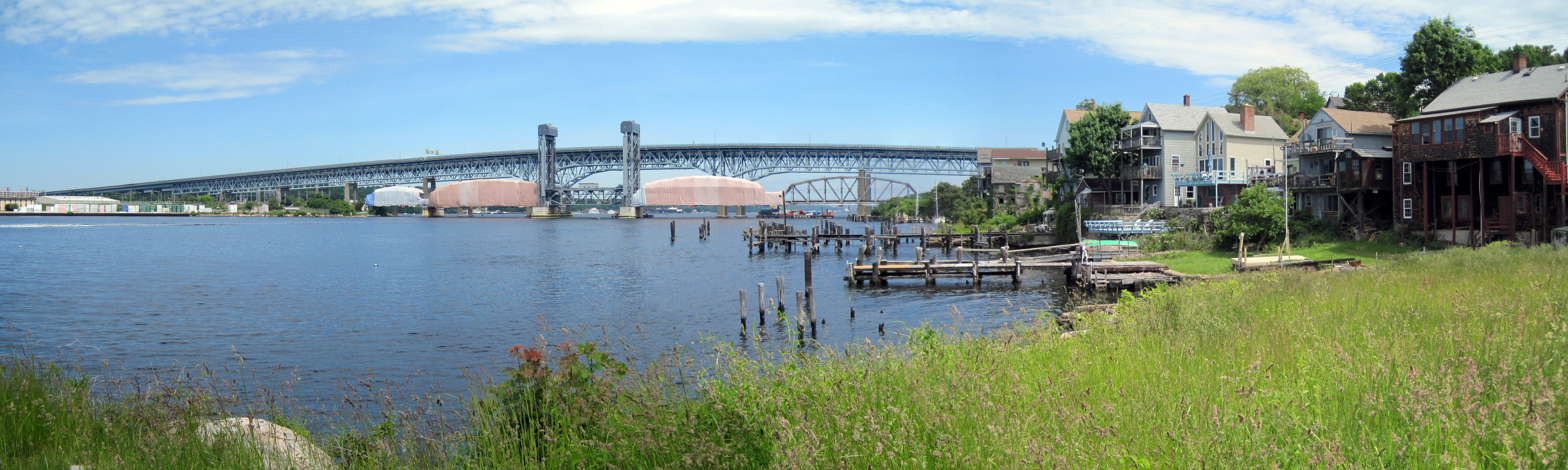
Panorama from the south, showing the northbound span and Amtrak bridge
