= Interstate 95 in Connecticut =

Highway in Connecticut

Interstate 95
- I-95 highlighted in red

Route information
- Maintained by CTDOT
- Length: 111.57 mi (179.55 km)
- Existed: 1959–present
- NHS: Entire route

Major junctions
- South end: I-95 at the New York state line in Greenwich
- US 7 in Norwalk; Route 25 / Route 8 in Bridgeport; Milford Parkway in Milford; I-91 in New Haven; Route 9 in Old Saybrook; I-395 in East Lyme
- North end: I-95 at the Rhode Island state line in Hopkinton, RI

Location
- Country: United States
- State: Connecticut
- Counties: Fairfield, New Haven, Middlesex, New London

Highway system
- Interstate Highway System; Main; Auxiliary; Suffixed; Business; Future; Connecticut State Highway System; Interstate; US; State; SSR; SR; Scenic
← Route 94	→ Route 97

Interstate 95 (I-95) is the main north–south Interstate Highway on the East Coast of the United States, running in a general east–west compass direction for 111.57 miles (179.55 km) in Connecticut, from the New York state line to the Rhode Island state line. I-95 from Greenwich to East Lyme is part of the Connecticut Turnpike, during which it passes through the major cities of Stamford, Bridgeport, and New Haven. After leaving the turnpike in East Lyme, I-95 is known as the Jewish War Veterans Memorial Highway and passes through New London, Groton, and Mystic, before exiting the state through North Stonington at the Rhode Island border and goes on.

== Route description ==
I-95 follows the Connecticut Turnpike from the New York state line eastward for 88 miles (142 km). This portion of the highway passes through the most heavily urbanized section of Connecticut along the shoreline between Greenwich and New Haven, with daily traffic volumes of around 150,000 vehicles throughout the entire 48-mile (77 km) length between the New York state line and the junction with I-91 in New Haven. The turnpike intersects with several major expressways, namely US Route 7 (US 7) in Norwalk, Route 25 and Route 8 in Bridgeport, the Merritt and Wilbur Cross parkways (via the Milford Parkway) in Milford, and I-91 in New Haven. The Connecticut Turnpike turns north and leaving I-95 and partially following I-395 up to Killingly (there branching off I-395 and turning toward Rhode Island). I-95 continues east for another 24 miles (39 km), skipping next in Waterford to avoid duplication of exit numbers with the original turnpike numbering in that town, reaching the state line with Rhode Island in Stonington.

=== Fairfield County ===
I-95 enters Connecticut at its crossing of the Byram River in the town of Greenwich in Fairfield County, where the highway continues southwest into New York as the New England Thruway. Upon entering Connecticut, the highway is a six-lane freeway known as the Connecticut Turnpike. The road is paralleled by Metro-North Railroad's New Haven Line to the northwest, which also carries Amtrak's Northeast Corridor, which it follows for much of its length throughout the state. I-95 heads northeast, passing through the affluent suburban development of the Gold Coast of southwestern Fairfield County and reaching a weigh station in the northbound direction, before turning east-northeast and passing south of downtown Greenwich. The road then heads into the neighborhood of Cos Cob before it crosses over the New Haven Line and the Mianus River, on the Mianus River Bridge. Past the river, I-95 comes to a trumpet interchange which provides access to US 1 between the neighborhoods of Riverside and Old Greenwich.

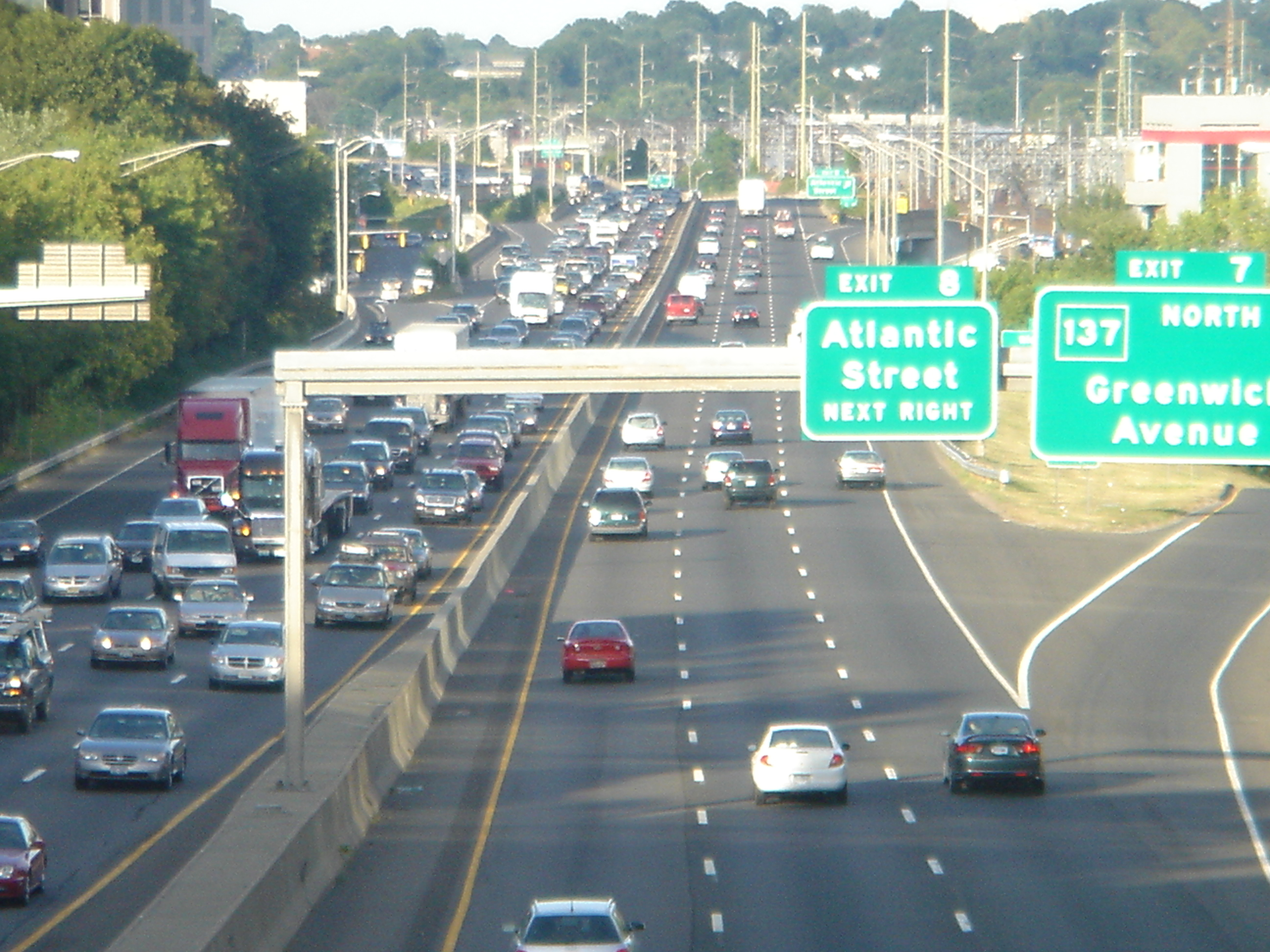
I-95 northbound in Stamford

After this interchange, the freeway enters the city of Stamford at the city's West Side. The road crosses the Rippowam River and enters the dense commercial area of Downtown Stamford, where it briefly becomes elevated and serves Route 137 near the Stamford Transportation Center. Upon leaving the downtown area, the freeway passes over the New Haven Line and crosses into the residential East Side of Stamford, where there is an interchange with US 1 that also provides access to Route 106. After this point, the southbound direction gains a fourth lane as the road enters the town of Darien, where there is a service plaza in the southbound direction. In the community of Noroton, the highway passes to the south of Noroton Heights station on the New Haven Line. Near the center of town, the southbound direction narrows to three lanes again, and I-95 has interchanges with US 1 and Route 136. Next, the freeway turns to the northeast, passing over the New Haven Line and coming to a service plaza and welcome center in the northbound direction, before reaching another interchange with US 1.

Immediately afterward, the road comes into the city of Norwalk in the neighborhood of South Norwalk. The freeway turns east-northeast and passes north of the Maritime Aquarium at Norwalk as it comes to an interchange with the southern terminus of US 7 and crosses the Danbury Branch of the New Haven Line within the interchange, before crossing the Norwalk River on the Yankee Doodle Bridge and entering East Norwalk. I-95 enters the town of Westport just prior to reaching an interchange with the southern terminus of Route 33 and Route 136. Past this interchange, the freeway proceeds to cross over the Saugatuck River and continues to an interchange with the Sherwood Island Connector, which provides access to US 1 and Sherwood Island State Park. The road curves through wooded residential areas, where it comes into the town of Fairfield. Here, I-95 reaches an interchange with US 1/Center Street, which serve the neighborhood of Southport, before crossing the Mill River. Passing to the north of the Fairfield Historic District, the freeway reaches a service plaza in both directions, where there also exists an interchange with Route 135, providing access to the main campus of Fairfield University. From this point, the road curves through an interchange with US 1 on the eastern edge of town.

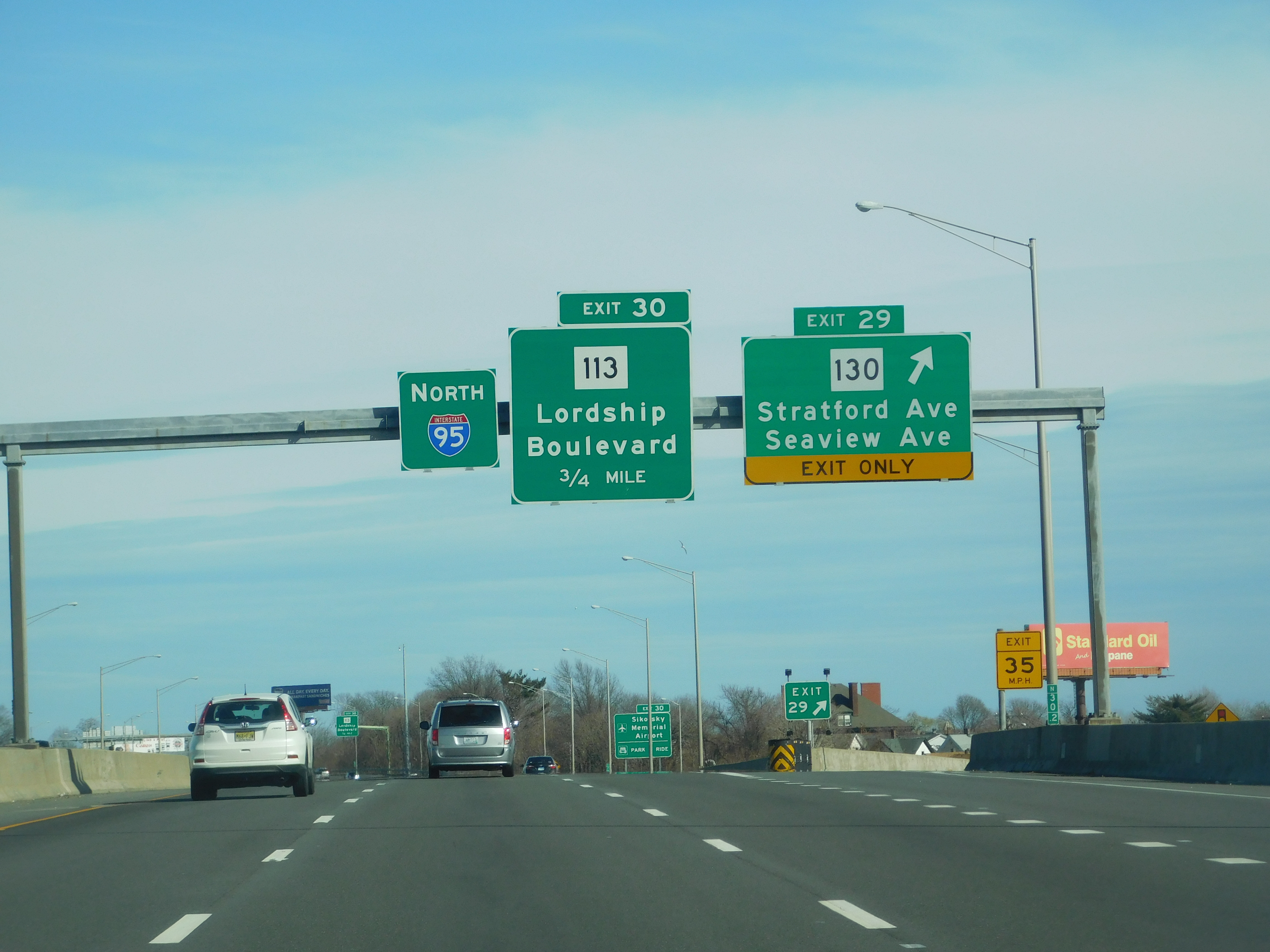
I-95 northbound in Bridgeport

Following US 1, I-95 enters the city of Bridgeport, which is the largest city in the state. On the city's West Side, the freeway has an interchange with Route 130, where it becomes elevated and gains a fourth southbound lane, as it passes through the industrial areas of the city's southwestern neighborhoods. Within that interchange, the road also crosses the New Haven Line. Farther east, I-95 crosses over the New Haven Line again and passes to the south of downtown Bridgeport. Here, the freeway provides access to many of the city's major landmarks in the South End and downtown area and meets the combined southern termini of Route 25 and Route 8, which both head north from I-95 as a freeway. From this point, the road narrows to three lanes in the southbound direction, and comes onto to the P.T. Barnum Bridge which carries it over the New Haven Line, adjacent to Bridgeport station, and the Pequonnock River. On the bridge, the northbound direction gains a fourth lane, as I-95 comes to an exit for Route 127 on Bridgeport's east side, after it passes over Route 130. I-95 reduces back to three lanes in the northbound direction, as it curves into the city's East End, where there is another interchange for Route 130. A short distance later, the freeway reaches an exit to Route 113 on the border of Stratford, providing access to Sikorsky Memorial Airport. Afterward, the road passes by downtown Stratford and heads into a commercial area, where it has an exit serving US 1 and the southern terminus of Route 110, before crossing the Housatonic River on the Moses Wheeler Bridge.

=== New Haven County ===
On the Moses Wheeler Bridge, I-95 crosses into Milford, New Haven County, where it heads into residential areas on the other side of the river. Here, the freeway has a trumpet interchange with US 1 within the village of Devon before it crosses the New Haven Line and passes south of the world headquarters of the Subway restaurant chain. The road continues northeast through wooded areas of the western part of Milford, where it reaches an exit for Route 15 (the Merritt and Wilbur Cross parkways), which is served by the Milford Parkway. The freeway curves as it passes northeast of downtown Milford and comes to a cloverleaf interchange with US 1 adjacent to Connecticut Post Mall, located at the northeastern corner of the interchange. The road heads northeast again into commercial surroundings and passes service plazas in both directions, before coming into the town of Orange, where it reaches an interchange with Marsh Hill Road. The overpass carrying Marsh Hill Road is called the Salemme Memorial Bridge, and the exit provides access to the west campus of Yale University.

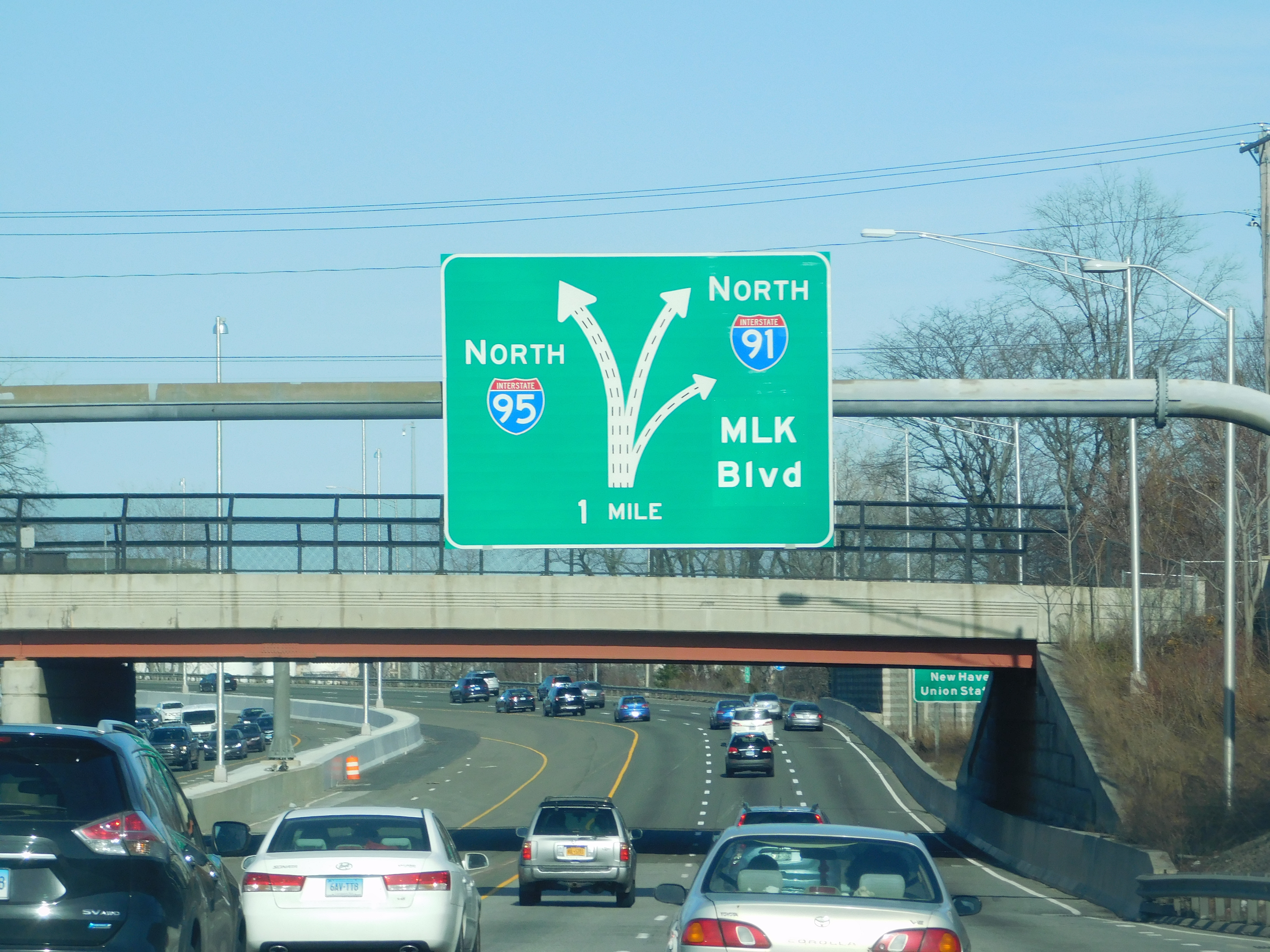
I-95 northbound near the Howard Avenue Overpass in New Haven

The road passes to the northwest of the Yale University west campus as it enters the city of West Haven. Here, I-95 passes mixed areas of suburban development, where it comes to an interchange with Route 162. Through trucks to downtown West Haven must use this exit, as trucks may not use the northbound exit ramp at the next interchange, for Campbell Avenue and the southern terminus of Route 122, due to its steep incline. The road curves as it crosses the New Haven Line and the West River and comes into the city of New Haven. Immediately after crossing the river, I-95 comes to an interchange with the southern terminus of Route 10, which provides access to the Yale Bowl and connects to Route 34. From this point, the freeway heads northeast, passing New Haven Harbor in the neighborhood of Long Wharf, before reaching the large interchange complex southeast of Downtown New Haven. The complex includes an interchange with a flyover ramp to M.L.K. Jr. Boulevard serving the downtown area and Yale University, as well as the southern terminus of I-91, which heads north-northeast from I-95 toward Hartford. Past I-91, the freeway turns southeast to cross the Quinnipiac River on the Pearl Harbor Memorial Bridge, locally known as simply the "Q Bridge". On the other side of the bridge, the road heads into another area of mixed development in the Annex neighborhood. Here, I-95 has an interchange with the western terminus of Route 337, which provides access to Tweed New Haven Airport.

Past this interchange, the freeway enters the town of East Haven, where US 1 parallels the highway on both sides as a frontage road with a full interchange, while the southbound direction widens into four lanes and northbound narrows to three lanes. Within the interchange, I-95 crosses the Northeast Corridor. A short distance later, there is a southbound exit and northbound entrance with Route 100 before the road curves east across Saltonstall Mountain and Lake Saltonstall and comes into the town of Branford. Within this area, I-95 passes through the Stewart B. McKinney National Wildlife Refuge where it comes to a northbound exit and southbound entrance with the Branford Connector, which connects to US 1, Route 142, and Route 146 near Short Beach. Just after the connector, there is a service plaza in both directions, and the freeway passes north of the center of Branford. From here, the road narrows to four lanes and continues east into more rural and wooded surroundings, coming to an interchange with US 1 on the east side of town. I-95 briefly enters a commercial area and passes north of the Stony Creek neighborhood. The freeway heads back into wooded areas as it enters the town of Guilford, where it comes to interchanges with US 1 and Route 77 north of Guilford Center. The road continues east across the East River marshlands and comes into the town of Madison. The road heads to the north of Madison Center, where it has an interchange with Route 79 with a park and ride lot in its northeastern corner. Past Route 79, I-95 passes service plazas in both directions, and reaches an interchange with the Hammonasset Connector, which provides access to Hammonasset Beach State Park. At this point, the route crosses over the Hammonasset River and leaves New Haven County.

=== Middlesex and New London counties ===
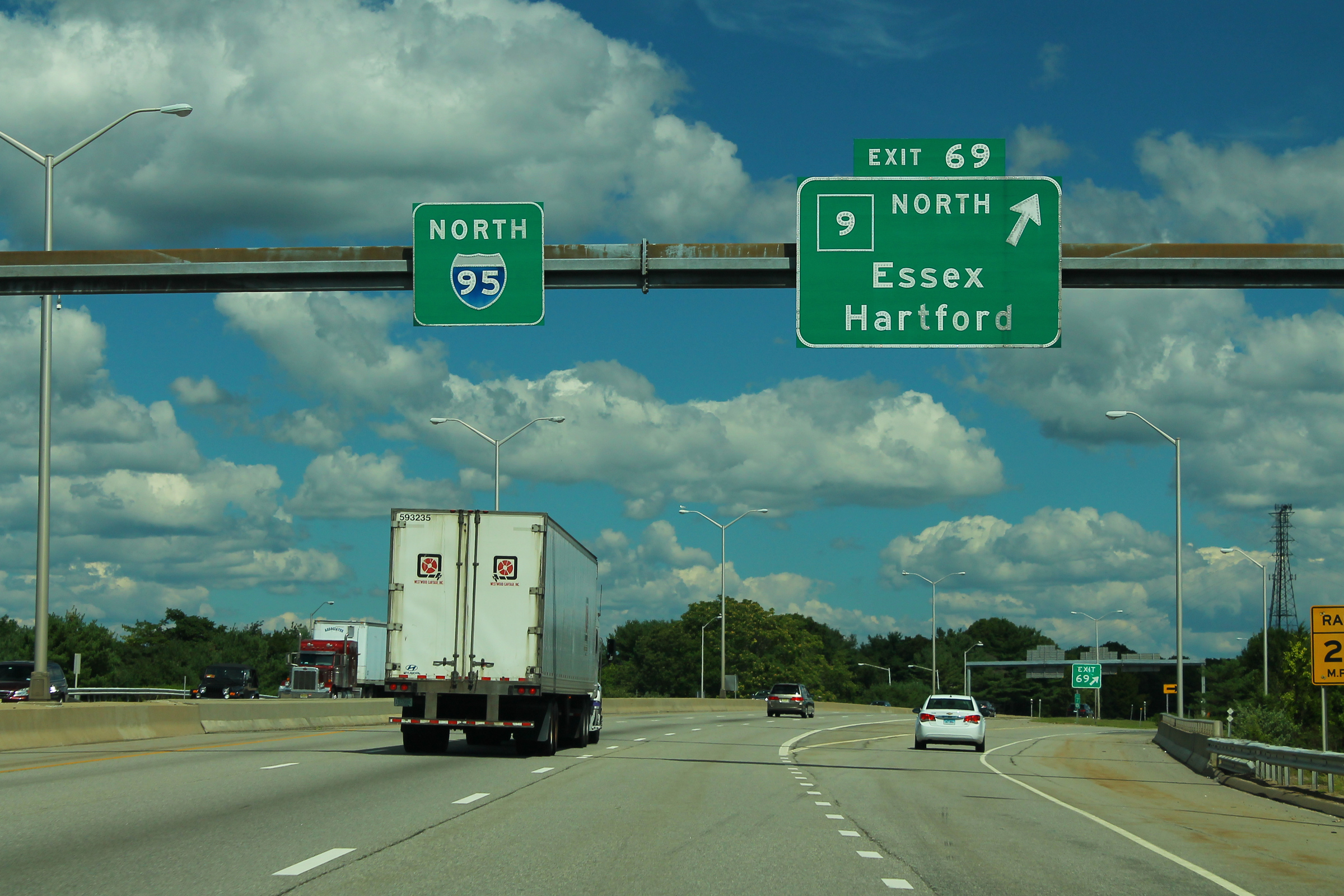
I-95 northbound at the Route 9 exit in Old Saybrook

Upon crossing the river, I-95 comes into Clinton, Middlesex County, continuing east through rural surroundings with some suburban elements. The freeway reaches an interchange with Route 81, close to the center of town adjacent to the Clinton Crossing Premium Outlets outlet mall, to the northwest of the interchange. From here, the road turns across the Menunketesuck River, after which it enters the town of Westbrook and reaches an interchange with Route 145. At this point, I-95 enters another curve before turning east again, at the interchange with Route 153 that also provides access to the Westbrook Outlets mall, just north of Westbrook Center. The freeway then reaches a pair of roadside stops, in which the northbound direction has a rest area and welcome center, and the southbound direction has access to Troop F of the Connecticut State Police, just before coming to the interchange for Route 166, where it enters the town of Old Saybrook. Within Old Saybrook, the road turns northeast and has an interchange with Route 154 northwest of Old Saybrook Center. On the east side of town, US 1 merges onto northbound I-95 and joins the route in a concurrency, as it widens to six lanes, and comes to a trumpet interchange with the southern terminus of Route 9, which heads northwest from I-95/US 1 as a freeway toward Greater Hartford. A short distance later, the two routes cross the Raymond E. Baldwin Bridge, that has a fourth southbound lane, over the Connecticut River.

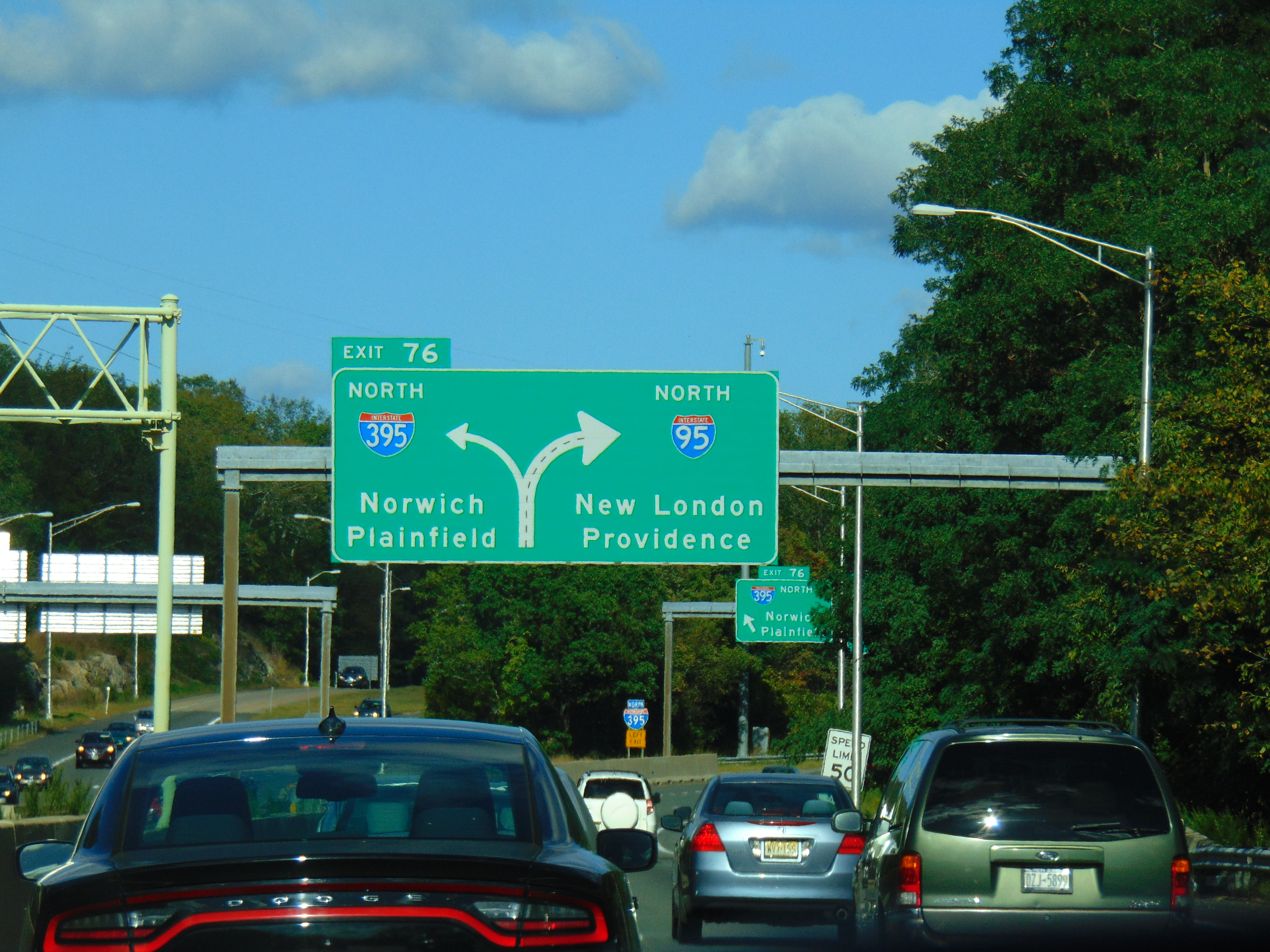
I-95 at the I-395 exit at the East Lyme–Waterford town line

Upon crossing the river, I-95/US 1 comes into Old Lyme, New London County, where southbound widens to four lanes prior to crossing the bridge, and it reaches the interchange with Route 156, where US 1 exits the highway and the concurrency ends. The freeway reduces to four lanes before it crosses the Lieutenant River and heads into a heavily forested area with little development around the highway, where it crosses the Duck River before entering the town of East Lyme. I-95 immediately comes to a trumpet interchange with the Rocky Neck Connector, providing access to Rocky Neck State Park. Continuing northeast through the center of East Lyme, the freeway enters into areas of mixed development with suburban elements before reaching an interchange with Route 161 in the village of Flanders. Shortly afterward, there is an interchange with US 1, and the highway crosses the Niantic River before meeting the southern terminus of I-395. Here, the Connecticut Turnpike splits to the northeast along I-395, which heads toward Norwich.

Past I-395, the freeway becomes the Jewish War Veterans Memorial Highway and enters the town of Waterford. A short distance later, the road heads into suburban-like commercial areas. I-95 has an interchange with Route 85 before entering the city of New London as it gains a third northbound lane and a frontage road. Running north of the downtown area and the New London Waterfront District, the freeway meets the southern terminus of Route 32. Past this interchange, US 1 merges onto northbound I-95, and the two routes turn east to run concurrent across the 10-lane Gold Star Memorial Bridge over the Thames River, where the highways come into the town of Groton. Before the end of the bridge, US 1 exits the highway, providing access to downtown Groton. The freeway narrows to six lanes as it reaches an interchange with the southern terminus of Route 12 and the western terminus of Route 184, which also provides access via Route 12 to the Naval Submarine Base New London. A short distance later, the road curves through a directional interchange with the northern terminus of Route 349, which spurs into downtown Groton. Past Route 349, the median widens, after many miles of having a Jersey barrier in the middle of the highway, and it heads into forested surroundings and crosses the Groton Reservoir. In the eastern part of Groton, I-95 has an interchange with Route 117, leading south to the village of Noank and north to the town of Ledyard. From here, the freeway passes a northbound scenic overlook and crosses the Mystic River.

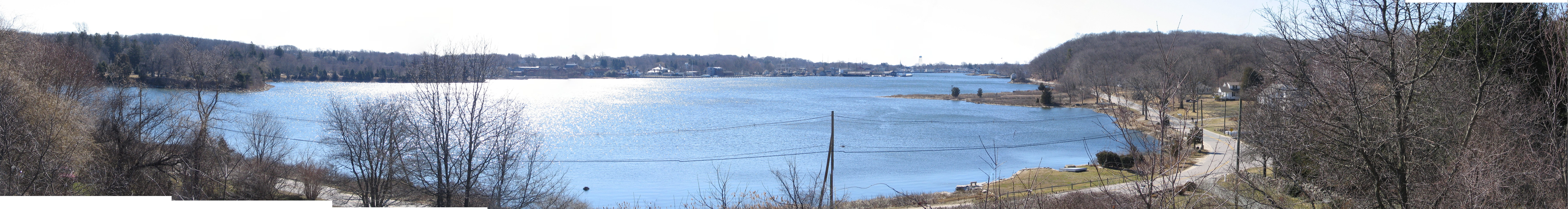
Panoramic view from the Jerome Hoxie Scenic Overlook, March 2006

Upon crossing the river, the road enters the town of Stonington, where it comes to an interchange with Route 27 within the village of Mystic, that provides access to Mystic Seaport, the Olde Mistick Village shopping mall, and Mystic Aquarium. At this point, I-95 reduces to four lanes, turns northeast past wooded areas with some residences, and comes to an interchange for Route 234 north of the center of Stonington, with a park-and-ride lot being located in the northwest corner of the interchange. From here, the freeway continues northeast to an interchange for Route 2/Route 49, providing access to the village of Pawcatuck to the south and a park and ride lot to the north in the middle of the interchange. Also, within the interchange, the southbound direction has a rest area and welcome center and the road comes into the town of North Stonington. I-95 continues to its last exit in Connecticut, the interchange with Route 216 and the eastern terminus of Route 184, as the median narrows. Immediately after this interchange, the freeway leaves Connecticut and continues as a four-lane freeway northeast into Rhode Island toward Providence.

== History ==
I-95 in Connecticut has far more exits than typical Interstate Highways, particularly in Fairfield and New Haven counties, with some exits less than one mile (1.6 km) apart. State transportation officials have said that the reason for the many exits stems from the state's original justification for building parts of the highway—to ease traffic congestion on US 1 by providing a faster alternate route, even for drivers traveling short distances within the same community. To overcome potential opposition to the highway from towns through which the route would traverse, the state agreed to guarantee each affected town a certain number of access points to the highway. Rather than skirting urban areas, the highway was built directly through the most dense sections of Stamford, Norwalk, Bridgeport, and New Haven.

While most of I-95 was built as the Connecticut Turnpike, the route incorporated several pieces of already-built relocations, some to freeway standards, of US 1 (the turnpike split from the US 1 relocation in East Lyme, along the Old Lyme–New London section):

- Darien bypass, opened c. 1952
- New Haven east of the Quinnipiac River, opened c. 1951
- Old Saybrook–Old Lyme, Raymond E. Baldwin Bridge over the Connecticut River and approaches, opened 1948
- Old Lyme–New London, opened by 1950 as a two-lane road
- New London–Groton Gold Star Bridge over the Thames River and approaches, opened 1943

Other improvements in the corridor included the New York–Meriden (Merritt Parkway/Wilbur Cross Parkway), New Haven–Old Saybrook (Route 80), and Groton–Rhode Island (Route 184), the latter connecting in Rhode Island to Route 3, a shortcut to Providence.

Most of the turnpike opened January 2, 1958, and was designated I-95 south and west of the split with the relocated US 1 by 1959. The rest of I-95 from I-395 to the Connecticut–Rhode Island border opened December 12, 1964. The Gold Star Bridge was twinned c. 1975, along with a reconstruction of its approaches, and in 1993 the Raymond E. Baldwin Bridge was replaced with a wider span.

The state installed cameras to watch traffic along the highway in the early 1990s. As of 2016, cameras had been set up at nearly every exit. The traffic feed from the cameras is monitored by state police and the Connecticut Department of Transportation (CTDOT), and is available on the World Wide Web.

=== Disasters ===
In January 1983, a truck with a brake failure slammed into a line of cars waiting to pay a toll on I-95 in Stratford; seven people died. This accident helped lead to the removal of toll barriers throughout Connecticut, which was completed six years after.

On the morning of June 28, 1983, a 100-foot (30 m) section of the Mianus River Bridge in Cos Cob collapsed, plunging northbound I-95 traffic into the Mianus River below, resulting in three deaths. The collapse was blamed on the failure of the steel pins to hold the horizontal beams together and inadequate inspection prior to the collapse. Northbound traffic was diverted on this section of I-95 for 25 days. Southbound traffic was unaffected.

On March 26, 2004, a bridge on I-95 in Bridgeport was partly melted by the explosion of a tanker truck carrying over 11,900 US gallons (45,000 L; 9,900 imp gal) of fuel oil. Repairs were estimated to take at least two weeks, but the highway was opened to northbound traffic in only a few days. Southbound traffic resumed about a week later after a temporary bridge was installed to carry traffic while the destroyed bridge was rebuilt.

At 10:20 am on November 2, 2007, a tanker truck carrying heating oil plowed over the divider, knocking the side of a tractor trailer and striking several other cars in its path. Three people died, including the driver of the tanker and the occupants of two cars that were completely destroyed in the crash. The driver of the tractor trailer survived (his canine companion emerged completely unharmed) but the trailer was split open. At least three other cars were involved in this accident. A part of the road was damaged and took until the next morning to fully reopen, partly due to a cleanup after the accident.

On May 2, 2024, a fuel tanker truck caught fire under an overpass in Norwalk after a collision with another truck and a passenger car while traveling southbound. The fire damaged the overpass and caused both directions of I-95 to be closed. Demolition of the bridge was completed by 12:30 p.m. on May 4, with the northbound lanes reopened by 8 p.m. that evening. The southbound lanes had to be repaved, and reopened by 10 a.m. on May 5.

=== Construction plans ===
While the corridor was designated "High Priority Corridor 65" in 2005, work along I-95 in Connecticut has been ongoing for nearly 30 years.

Interstate upgrades include:

- Replace the bridge over the Connecticut River in Old Saybrook (completed in 1993)
- Replace the bridge over the Saugatuck River in Westport (completed in 2001)
- Widening and reconstruction of I-95 through Bridgeport (completed in 2006)
- Upgrade the median divider from New York state line to Waterford to meet current safety standards (segmented construction ongoing since 1993)
- Construction of a new extradosed Q Bridge (Pearl Harbor Memorial Bridge) over the Quinnipiac River (completed in 2015)
- Reconfiguring the interchange between I-91, I-95, and Route 34 in New Haven (completed in 2016)
- Replace bridge over the West River in New Haven (completed in June 2018). Exit 44, southbound, was closed in April 2015, and the remaining ramps at exit 45, northbound, and southbound were realigned and renumbered exit 44.
- Reconstruct I-95/I-395 interchange in Waterford to accommodate proposed Route 11 expressway connection (proposed).
- Replacement of the Moses Wheeler Bridge over the Housatonic River (completed in 2016)
- Widening and reconstruction of I-95 between Norwalk and Stamford—in December 2007, a 15-month, $5.5-million (equivalent to $7.99 million in 2024) project was completed to add fourth (or "operational") lanes in each direction between the entrances and exits at exits 10 and 11 in Darien. This project was completed in 2007. A similar project between exits 11 and 13 began in 2008 and was completed in 2010. An earlier project added a fourth lane on the southbound side from the entrance at exit 10 to exit 8. After that lane was added, a CTDOT study concluded that accidents were down on that stretch of the highway by 20 percent, amounting to about 160 fewer accidents per year.
- Add southbound offramp and northbound onramp at exit 33 in Stratford (completed in 2021 and 2022)
- Widen I-95 mainline from Branford to the Rhode Island state line (proposed)
- Adding an operational lane between exits 14 and 15 in Norwalk (completed in 2016)

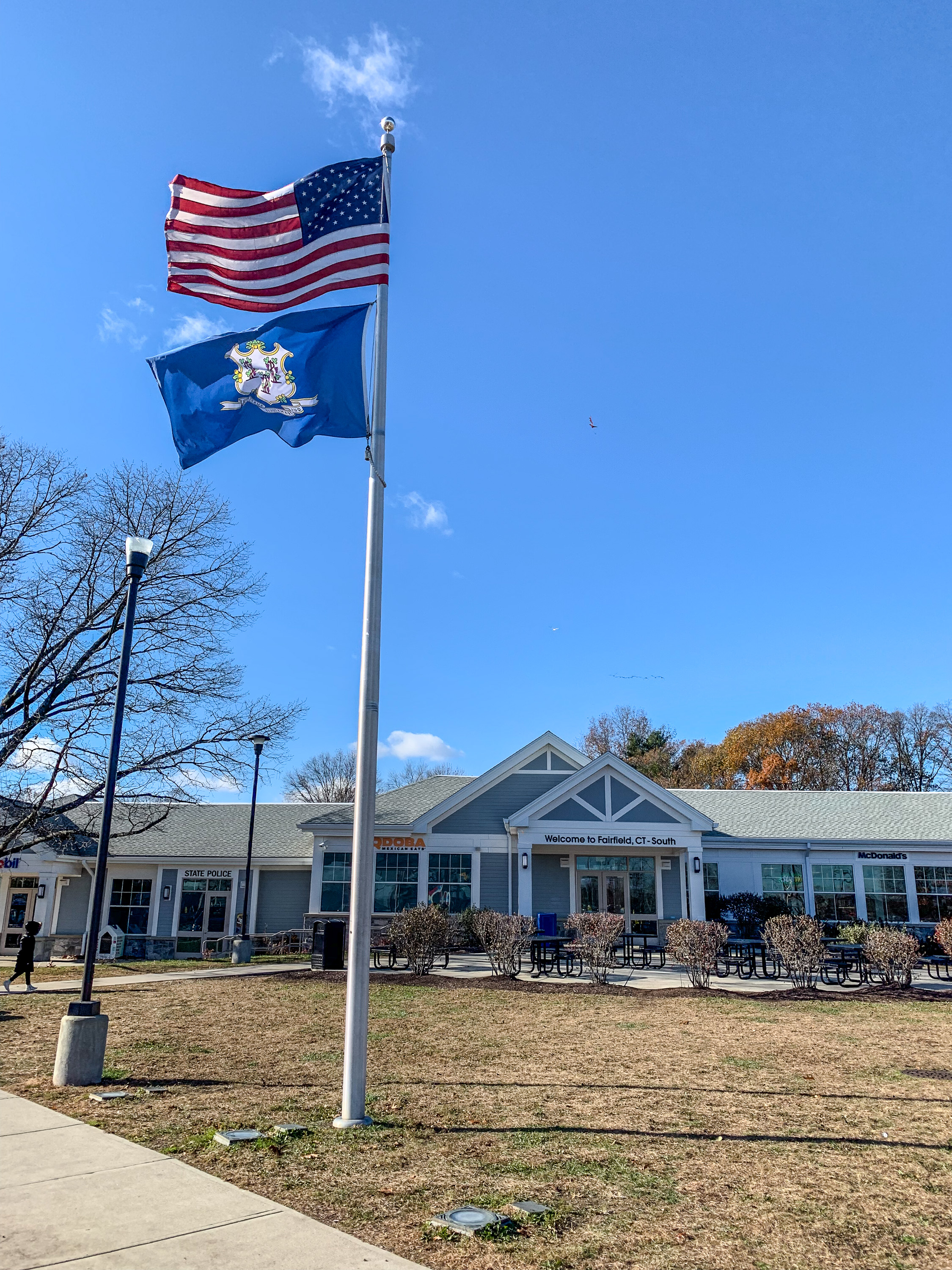
Fairfield Service Plaza (Southbound) in 2018

- From 2011 to 2015, all 10 of the service plazas along I-95 were rebuilt (pairs of plazas are located in Darien, Fairfield, Milford, Branford, and Madison, with a separate plaza for each direction of I-95). All of the renovated plazas feature modernized Mobil gas stations, Alltown convenience stores, Dunkin' Donuts, and Subway shops. McDonald's is also available at eight of the 10 plazas, while the largest plazas additionally feature Sbarro, Panda Express, and various other quick-service options. The last of the plazas to be rebuilt, southbound in Madison, opened in August 2015.

Mass transit upgrade projects have been undertaken in large part to reduce traffic on the highway, which is often congested, particularly in Fairfield County:

- New train station near the Fairfield–Bridgeport city line (completed in 2011, fully operational in January 2012)
- Intermodal Transportation Center in Bridgeport (completed)
- New train station in West Haven (completed)
- Upgrade catenary power lines along the New Haven Line (underway through the 2010s)
- New train station in Madison (completed)
- Purchase new railroad cars and refurbish existing cars to increase capacity and reliability
- Construct new container barge ports at Bridgeport and New Haven
- Expansion of freight service on the New Haven Line
- Replace outdated bridges and straighten various sections of the New Haven Line to allow higher operating speeds for Amtrak and Metro-North trains

== Exit list ==
Exit numbers are currently sequential but will be changed to mileage-based in 2028. Exits 2 to 76 are based on the original sequential Connecticut Turnpike exit numbers. North of exit 76, the I-95 numbering jumps to exit 80 to avoid duplicate exit numbers in Waterford as the Connecticut Turnpike numbering originally continued north at exit 76 to follow I-395. Additionally, the now-cancelled Route 11 freeway was planned to be extended from its current terminus at Route 82 in Salem to I-95 in the vicinity of the I-395 interchange in Waterford; thus the unused exit numbers 77 through 79 were available for a potential interchange with Route 11.

County	Location	mi	km	Old exit	New exit	Destinations	Notes
Fairfield	Greenwich	0.00	0.00	–	–	I-95 south to I-287 west – New York, White Plains, Tappan Zee Bridge	Continuation into New York
Fairfield	Greenwich	0.80	1.29	2	1	Delavan Avenue – Byram	
Fairfield	Greenwich	2.00	3.22	Former toll plaza			
Fairfield	Greenwich	2.54	4.09	3	2	Arch Street	
Fairfield	Greenwich	3.73	6.00	4	3	Indian Field Road – Cos Cob	
Fairfield	Greenwich	4.35– 4.85	7.00– 7.81	Mianus River Bridge over the Mianus River			
Fairfield	Greenwich	5.53	8.90		5	US 1 – Riverside, Old Greenwich	
Fairfield	Stamford	6.50– 6.62	10.46– 10.65		6	Harvard Avenue / West Avenue	Signed for Harvard Avenue northbound, West Avenue southbound
Fairfield	Stamford	7.34	11.81		7	Route 137 north / Greenwich Avenue	Northbound exit and southbound entrance; access via Route 137 via SSR 493
Fairfield	Stamford	7.68	12.36		8	Canal Street	Northbound exit and southbound entrance
Fairfield	Stamford				7	Route 137 north / Atlantic Street	Southbound exit and northbound entrance
Fairfield	Stamford	8.20	13.20		8	Elm Street	Southbound exit and northbound entrance
Fairfield	Stamford	9.28	14.93		9	US 1 / Route 106 north – Glenbrook	Southern terminus of Route 106
Fairfield	Darien	10.75	17.30		10	Noroton	Access via Noroton Avenue
Fairfield	Darien	11.61	18.68		11	US 1 – Darien, Rowayton	
Fairfield	Darien	12.23	19.68		12	Route 136 (Tokeneke Road) – Rowayton	Northbound exit and southbound entrance
Fairfield	Darien	13.16	21.18		13	US 1 (Post Road)	
Fairfield	Norwalk	14.83	23.87		14	US 1 (Connecticut Avenue) – South Norwalk	Signed for US 1 southbound, South Norwalk northbound
Fairfield	Norwalk	15.50	24.94		15	US 7 north – Norwalk, Danbury	Southern terminus of US 7
Fairfield	Norwalk	15.91– 16.08	25.60– 25.88	Yankee Doodle Bridge over the Norwalk River			
Fairfield	Norwalk	16.24	26.14		16	East Norwalk	Access via East Avenue
Fairfield	Norwalk	18.00	28.97	Former toll plaza			
Fairfield	Westport	18.14	29.19		17	Route 33 north / Route 136 – Westport, Saugatuck	Southern terminus of Route 33
Fairfield	Westport	20.36	32.77	18	20	Sherwood Island Connector (SSR 476)	To US 1 and Sherwood Island State Park
Fairfield	Fairfield	22.88– 23.12	36.82– 37.21	19	23A	US 1 – Southport	Signed for US 1 southbound, Center Street northbound; signed as exit 23 northbound
Fairfield	Fairfield	23.72	38.17	20	23B	Bronson Road	Southbound exit and northbound entrance
Fairfield	Fairfield	24.38	39.24	21	24	Mill Plain Road	
Fairfield	Fairfield	25.03	40.28	22	25A	Round Hill Road – Service Plaza	Northbound exit and southbound entrance
Fairfield	Fairfield	25.22	40.59	22	25A	Route 135 (North Benson Road)	Southbound exit and northbound entrance
Fairfield	Fairfield	25.73	41.41	23	25B	US 1 (Kings Highway)	
Fairfield	Fairfield	26.70	42.97	24	26	Black Rock Turnpike (SR 732 north)	Access via US 1
Fairfield	Bridgeport	27.44	44.16	25	27	Commerce Drive / State Street	Northbound exit and southbound entrance
Fairfield	Bridgeport	27.66	44.51	25	27	Route 130 (Fairfield Avenue)	Southbound exit and northbound entrance
Fairfield	Bridgeport	28.30	45.54	26	28A	Wordin Avenue	Signed as exit 28 southbound
Fairfield	Bridgeport	29.00	46.67	27	28B	Lafayette Boulevard – Downtown Bridgeport	Northbound exit and southbound entrance
Fairfield	Bridgeport	29.03	46.72	27A	29A (NB); 29C (SB)	Route 25 north / Route 8 north – Trumbull, Waterbury	Southern terminus and exits 1A and 1B on Route 25 south/Route 8 south; signed as exit 29A northbound and exit 29C southbound
Fairfield	Bridgeport	29.15	46.91	27B 27C	29A	Transportation Center, Long Island Ferry, Total Mortgage Arena	Southbound exit and northbound entrance; access via Lafayette Street
Fairfield	Bridgeport	29.15	46.91	27B 27C	29A	Lafayette Boulevard – Downtown Bridgeport	Southbound exit and northbound entrance
Fairfield	Bridgeport	29.33– 29.81	47.20– 47.97	P.T. Barnum Bridge over the Pequonnock River			
Fairfield	Bridgeport	29.87	48.07	28	29B	Route 127 north (East Main Street)	Northbound exit and southbound entrance; southern terminus of Route 127
Fairfield	Bridgeport	30.19	48.59	29	30	Route 130 (Stratford Avenue)	Access via Seaview Avenue
Fairfield	Bridgeport–Stratford line	31.07– 31.30	50.00– 50.37	30	31	Route 113 north (Lordship Boulevard) / Surf Avenue	Signed for Route 113 northbound, Surf Avenue southbound; southern terminus of Route 113
Fairfield	Stratford	32.12– 32.30	51.69– 51.98	31	32A	Honeyspot Road / South Avenue / Stratford Avenue	Signed for Honeyspot Road northbound, South Avenue southbound
Fairfield	Stratford	32.87	52.90	32	32B	West Broad Street – Stratford	
Fairfield	Stratford	33.00	53.11	Former toll plaza			
Fairfield	Stratford	34.00	54.72		33	US 1 / Route 110 north (East Main Street) / Ferry Boulevard (Route 130 west)	Southern terminus of Route 110
Housatonic River		34.25– 34.86	55.12– 56.10	Moses Wheeler Bridge			
New Haven	Milford	35.37	56.92	34	35A	US 1 – Milford	
New Haven	Milford	35.85	57.69	35	35B	School House Road / Sub Way / Bic Drive	To Subway headquarters
New Haven	Milford	36.69	59.05		36	Plains Road	
New Haven	Milford	37.45	60.27	37	37A	High Street	Northbound exit and southbound entrance
New Haven	Milford	37.60	60.51	38	37B	To Route 15 (Merritt Parkway / Wilbur Cross Parkway)	Access via Milford Parkway north and exits 2A and 2B on Milford Parkway south; signed as exit 37 southbound
New Haven	Milford	39.13	62.97		39S-N	US 1 – Downtown Milford	Signed as exits 39A (US 1 south) and 39B (US 1 north)
New Haven	Milford				40	Old Gate Lane (SR 708 east) to Woodmont Road	Northbound exit only
New Haven	Milford	40.25	64.78		40	Woodmont Road	No northbound exit
New Haven	Orange	41.80	67.27		41	Marsh Hill Road	
New Haven	West Haven	43.93	70.70	42	43	Route 162 (Saw Mill Road)	
New Haven	West Haven	44.00	70.81	Former toll plaza			
New Haven	West Haven	44.87	72.21	43	45	Campbell Avenue – Downtown West Haven	Northbound exit and southbound entrance
New Haven	West Haven	45.19	72.73	43	45	Route 122 north (First Avenue)	Southbound exit and northbound entrance; southern terminus of Route 122
New Haven	New Haven	46.06	74.13	44	46A	Route 10 north (Ella T. Grasso Boulevard) to Route 34 west – Downtown West Haven, Yale Stadiums	Southern terminus of Route 10; former exit 45 southbound; Downtown West Haven not signed northbound
New Haven	New Haven	46.82– 47.26	75.35– 76.06	46	46B	Long Wharf Drive / Sargent Drive	
New Haven	New Haven	47.46– 47.75	76.38– 76.85	47	47A	Oak Street Connector (SR 724 west) – Downtown New Haven	Signed as MLK Boulevard; former Route 34
New Haven	New Haven	47.58– 47.91	76.57– 77.10	48	47B	I-91 north – Hartford	Southern terminus and exits 1A and 1C on I-91 south
New Haven	New Haven	47.80– 48.67	76.93– 78.33	Pearl Harbor Memorial Bridge over the Quinnipiac River			
New Haven	New Haven	49.21	79.20	50	48	Woodward Avenue – Lighthouse Point, Port Area	Northbound exit and southbound entrance
New Haven	East Haven	49.50– 50.22	79.66– 80.82	51	49	US 1 (Frontage Road) – East Haven, Lighthouse Point, Port Area	Signed for East Haven northbound, Lighthouse Point southbound
New Haven	East Haven	50.53	81.32	52	50	Route 100 (North High Street) – East Haven	Southbound exit and northbound entrance
New Haven	Branford	51.00	82.08	Former toll plaza			
New Haven	Branford	52.33	84.22	53	52	US 1 / Route 142 west / Route 146 east – Short Beach	Northbound exit and southbound entrance; access via SR 794
New Haven	Branford	53.24	85.68	54	53	Cedar Street (SR 740) – Branford	
New Haven	Branford	55.19	88.82		55	US 1 (East Main Street) – North Branford	North Branford not signed southbound
New Haven	Branford	56.25	90.53		56	Leetes Island Road – Stony Creek	
New Haven	Guilford	59.32	95.47	57	59	US 1 (Boston Post Road) – North Branford	North Branford not signed northbound
New Haven	Guilford	60.23	96.93	58	60	Route 77 – Guilford, North Guilford	
New Haven	Guilford	61.49	98.96	59	61	Goose Lane	
New Haven	Madison	63.00	101.39	Former toll plaza			
New Haven	Madison	63.48	102.16	60	63	Mungertown Road	Southbound exit and northbound entrance
New Haven	Madison			Madison service plaza			
New Haven	Madison	64.73	104.17	61	64	Route 79 – Madison, North Madison	
New Haven	Madison	66.43	106.91	62	66	Hammonasset State Park	Access via SSR 450
Middlesex	Clinton	68.61	110.42	63	68	Route 81 – Clinton, Killingworth	
Middlesex	Westbrook	70.78	113.91	64	70	Route 145 (Horse Hill Road) – Clinton	
Middlesex	Westbrook	73.14	117.71	65	73	Route 153 – Westbrook	
Middlesex	Old Saybrook	74.40	119.74	66	74	Route 166 (Spencer Plain Road)	
Middlesex	Old Saybrook	75.93– 76.74	122.20– 123.50	67	76	Route 154 – Old Saybrook	Signed for CT 154 northbound, Elm Street southbound
Middlesex	Old Saybrook	77.80– 78.28	125.21– 125.98	68	77	US 1 south – Old Saybrook	Southern end of US 1 concurrency; southbound exit and northbound entrance
Middlesex	Old Saybrook	78.07	125.64	69	78	Route 9 north – Essex, Hartford	Southern terminus and exits 1A and 1B on Route 9 south; trumpet interchange
Middlesex	Old Saybrook	78.00	125.53	Former toll plaza			
Connecticut River		78.45– 78.93	126.25– 127.03	Raymond E. Baldwin Bridge			
New London	Old Lyme	79.16	127.40	70	79	US 1 north / Route 156 – Old Lyme	Northern end of US 1 concurrency; US 1 not signed southbound
New London	Old Lyme	83.49	134.36	71	83	Four Mile River Road	
New London	East Lyme	84.02	135.22	72	84	Rocky Neck State Park	Access via SSR 449
New London	East Lyme	85.79	138.07	73	85	Society Road	
New London	East Lyme	87.28	140.46	74	87	Route 161 – Flanders, Niantic	
New London	East Lyme	88.05	141.70	75	88A	US 1 – Waterford, Flanders	Signed as exit 88 southbound
New London	East Lyme	88.48	142.39	76	88B	I-395 north – Norwich	Northbound left exit and southbound entrance; southern terminus of I-395; to Mohegan Reservation; former Route 52
New London	Waterford	88.73	142.80	80	89	Oil Mill Road	Southbound exit and northbound entrance
New London	Waterford	90.12	145.03	81	90	Cross Road	
New London	Waterford	91.81	147.75	82	91	Route 85 (Broad Street) – Waterford	
New London	New London	92.26	148.48	82A	92	Frontage Road (SR 623) – New London	No southbound exit; to Coast Guard Academy and Mitchell College; access via (SR 623)
New London	New London	92.75– 93.15	149.27– 149.91	83	93A	US 1 south / Frontage Road (SR 624) – New London, Shopping Malls	Southern end of US 1 concurrency; southbound exit and northbound entrance; access via (SR 624)
New London	New London	93.35– 93.48	150.23– 150.44	83 (NB); 84N (SB) 84E 84S	93B	Route 32 north – Norwich	Southern terminus of Route 32; signed as exit 93 northbound
New London	New London	93.35– 93.48	150.23– 150.44	83 (NB); 84N (SB) 84E 84S	93B	State Pier, Hodges Square	Southbound exit and northbound entrance; access via SR 635
New London	New London	93.35– 93.48	150.23– 150.44	83 (NB); 84N (SB) 84E 84S	93B	New London Waterfront District	Southbound exit and northbound entrance; access via Eugene O'Neill Drive
New London	Thames River	93.59– 94.71	150.62– 152.42	Gold Star Memorial Bridge			
New London	Groton	94.63	152.29	85	94	US 1 north to Thames Street – Downtown Groton	Northern end of US 1 concurrency northbound; northbound exit and southbound entrance; access to Thames Street via Bridge Street
New London	Groton	95.33	153.42	86	95	Route 12 north / Route 184 east – U.S. Submarine Base, Gales Ferry	Southern terminus of Route 12; western terminus and exit 1 on Route 184; no eastbound entrance; northern end of US 1 concurrency southbound
New London	Groton	95.98	154.46	87	96	Route 349 south to US 1 – Groton City	Northern terminus and exit 3B on Route 349; US 1 not signed northbound
New London	Groton	97.50	156.91	88	97	Route 117 – Groton, Groton Long Point, Noank	
New London	Groton	100.07	161.05	89	100	Allyn Street (SR 614)	
New London	Stonington	101.31	163.04	90	101	Route 27 – Mystic	Serves Olde Mistick Village Shopping Center, Mystic Aquarium and Mystic Seaport
New London	Stonington	104.11– 104.55	167.55– 168.26	91	104	Route 234 – Stonington	
New London	North Stonington	107.78	173.46	92	108	Route 2 to Route 49 – North Stonington, Pawcatuck	Northbound exit and southbound entrance; access to Route 49 via SR 617
New London	North Stonington	108.60	174.77	92	108	Route 49 to Route 2 – North Stonington, Pawcatuck	Southbound exit and northbound entrance; access to Route 2 via SR 617
New London	North Stonington	111.35	179.20	93	111	Route 184 west / Route 216 – Clarks Falls, Ashaway, RI	Route 184 not signed
New London	North Stonington	111.57	179.55		–	I-95 north – Providence	Continuation into Rhode Island
1.000 mi = 1.609 km; 1.000 km = 0.621 mi: Closed/former; Concurrency terminus; Incomplete access

== Auxiliary routes ==
I-395 is I-95's only auxiliary route in Connecticut, which runs from the junction with I-95 in Waterford north to the Massachusetts state line where it meets I-90 (Massachusetts Turnpike) and I-290 south of Worcester, Massachusetts.

Interstate 95
Previous state: New York	Connecticut	Next state: Rhode Island
