= Two-way street =

Term for road transportation

Two-way street sign in Ukraine

A two-way street is a street that allows vehicles to travel in both directions. On most two-way streets, especially main streets, a line is painted down the middle of the road to remind drivers to stay on their side of the road. Sometimes one portion of a street is two-way and the other portion is one-way. If there is no line, a car must stay on the appropriate side and watch for cars coming in the opposite direction and prepare to pull over to let them pass.

== See also ==
- Dual carriageway
- One-way traffic
