= Thames River (Connecticut) =

River in Connecticut, United States

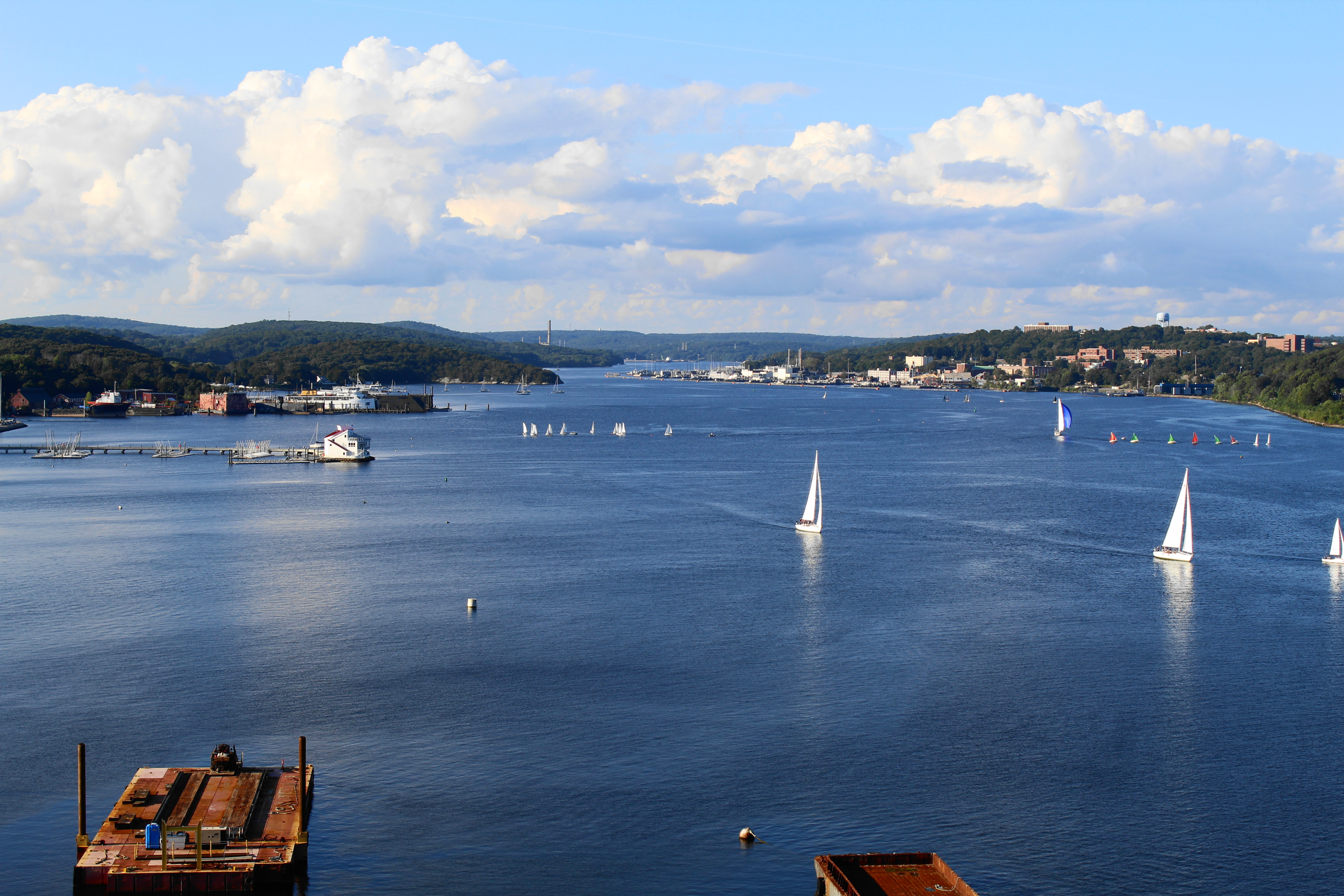
- The Thames River from the Gold Star Bridge in New London.

Location
- Country: United States
- State: Connecticut
- County: New London

Physical characteristics
- Source: Confluence of The Yantic and Shetucket rivers
  - location: Norwich
  - coordinates: 41°31′18″N 72°04′43″W
- Mouth: Long Island Sound
  - location: New London and Groton
  - coordinates: 41°18′45″N 72°04′49″W
- Length: 15 mi (24 km)
- Width
  - minimum: 377 feet (115 m)
  - maximum: 4,348 feet (1,325 m)

The Thames River (/θeɪmz/ THAYMZ) is a short river and tidal estuary in the state of Connecticut. It flows south for 15 miles (24 km) through eastern Connecticut from the junction of the Yantic River and Shetucket River at Norwich, Connecticut, to New London and Groton, Connecticut, which flank its mouth at Long Island Sound. The Thames River watershed includes a number of smaller basins and the 80-mile (130 km) long Quinebaug River, which rises in southern Massachusetts and joins the Shetucket River about four miles northeast of Norwich.

== History ==
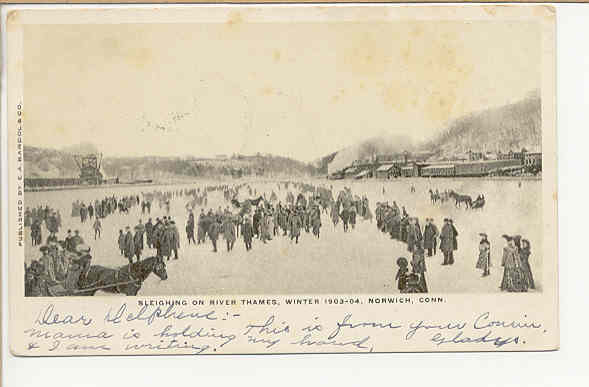
Sleighing on the frozen river, winter of 1903–1904

The river has provided important harbors since the mid-17th century. It was originally known as the Pequot River after the Pequot Indians who dominated the area. Other early names for the river have included Frisius, Great, Great River of Pequot, Little Fresh, New London, and Pequod. The town was officially named New London in 1658 and the estuary river was renamed Thames after the River Thames in London, England.

The United States Coast Guard Academy, Connecticut College, a U.S. Navy submarine base, and the Electric Boat submarine shipyard are located on the river at New London and Groton. USS Nautilus was launched into the river on January 21, 1954, from Electric Boat, becoming the world's first nuclear-powered submarine.

In addition to the submarine bases, a US Navy Magnetic Silencing Facility is also installed within the mouth of the river.

Two historic forts overlook the mouth of the river at New London harbor, now Connecticut State Parks: Fort Griswold on the eastern Groton Heights, and Fort Trumbull on the New London side.

=== Events ===
The Harvard-Yale Regatta is held annually in New London. New London's Sailfest is an annual event which includes Operation Sail, a gathering of large sailing vessels including the Coast Guard training ship USCGC Eagle.

== Crossings ==
| Town | Name | Carrying |
|---|---|---|
| Montville/ Preston | Mohegan-Pequot Bridge | Route 2A |
| New London/ Groton | Gold Star Memorial Bridge | I-95 and US 1 |
| New London/ Groton | Thames River Bridge | Amtrak |

== See also ==
- List of Connecticut rivers
- River Thames—London, England, United Kingdom
