= Connecticut Route 184 =

State highway in New London County, Connecticut, US

Route 184
- Route 184 highlighted in red

Route information
- Maintained by CTDOT
- Length: 15.66 mi (25.20 km)
- Existed: 1964–present

Major junctions
- West end: I-95 / US 1 / Route 12 in Groton
- East end: I-95 / Route 216 in North Stonington

Location
- Country: United States
- State: Connecticut
- Counties: New London

Highway system
- Connecticut State Highway System; Interstate; US; State; SSR; SR; Scenic
← Route 183	→ Route 185

Route 184 is a state highway in southeastern Connecticut, running from Groton to North Stonington.

== Route description ==
Route 184 begins as a freeway from northbound exit 86 of I-95 just north of the city of Groton. It crosses over Route 12 0.2 miles (0.32 km) later at an interchange and soon becomes a surface road after another quarter of a mile. The road continues east northeast towards the village of Center Groton, where it meets Route 117. It continues another 3.4 miles (5.5 km) via Burnetts Corner to the head of the Mystic River in the village of Old Mystic near the Stonington town line. Route 184 travels four miles (6 km) through the northern part of Stonington before entering the town of North Stonington. It has a junction with Route 2 at a rotary south of North Stonington center. Beyond Route 2, the surroundings become rural as Route 184 heads towards the Rhode Island state line. Route 184 ends just short of the state line at Route 216 near exit 93 of I-95. The roadway continues past Route 216 to the state line as State Road 626, which originally connected with Rhode Island Route 3 prior to the construction of I-95 in the area.

Route 184 is also known as Gold Star Highway, New London Turnpike, and Providence-New London Turnpike along its lengths in Groton, Stonington, and North Stonington respectively.

== History ==
In 1818, a turnpike was chartered to provide an improved road from the Thames River ferry (between New London and Groton, Connecticut) to the Hopkinton and Richmond Turnpike in Rhode Island, known as the Groton and Stonington Turnpike. The toll road ran more or less along the modern alignment of Route 184. The establishment of this road completed a continuous turnpike route from Providence, Rhode Island to New London. The turnpike corporation was dissolved in 1853, one year after opening continuous rail service from New York City to Boston via Providence.

Route 84
- Location: Groton–Rhode Island state line
- Existed: 1932–1958

Route 95
- Location: Groton–Rhode Island state line
- Existed: 1958–1964

The route from the borough of Groton to the town center of North Stonington was designated as State Highway 331 in 1922. Highway 331 used modern Route 184 to the junction with Route 201, then Route 201 until the intersection with Route 2. In 1932, Route 84 was established from part of old Highway 331 along the current routes of Route 184 to Old Mystic, then modern Route 234 to US 1 in Pawcatuck. In 1935, Route 84 was relocated to the current route along the old Groton and Stonington Turnpike alignment to the Rhode Island state line. In 1958, Route 84 was renumbered to Route 95 to serve as a temporary link for motorists following I-95, which had not yet been completed in Southeastern Connecticut. In December 1964, Route 95 was renumbered as I-95 opened in the Groton area. The eastern terminus was also truncated from the state line to its current location.

== Junction list ==
As part of an I-95 signing contract, the Route 12 interchange received a mile-based number. The entire route is in New London County.

Location	mi	km	Exit	Destinations	Notes
Groton	0.00	0.00	—	I-95 south / US 1 south – New London	Western terminus; exit 95 on I-95; southern end of US 1 concurrency southbound
Groton	0.21	0.34	1	US 1 north / Route 12 north – Gales Ferry, Downtown Groton	Exit number only signed at gore; US 1 not signed; northern end of US 1 concurrency southbound
Groton			Eastern end of freeway section		
Groton	2.70	4.35		Route 117 – Poquonock Bridge, Ledyard	
Groton	5.31	8.55		Cow Hill Road (SR 614 south)	
Groton	6.08	9.78		Route 27 south – Mystic	Northern terminus of Route 27
Stonington	7.54	12.13		Route 201 north – North Stonington	Southern terminus of Route 201
North Stonington	12.23	19.68		Route 2 – Pawcatuck, Norwich	Roundabout
North Stonington	13.06	21.02		Route 49 – Pawcatuck, Voluntown	
North Stonington	15.66	25.20		I-95 / Route 216 / Providence–New London Turnpike (SR 626 east) – North Stonington, Ashaway, RI	Eastern terminus; exit 111 on I-95
1.000 mi = 1.609 km; 1.000 km = 0.621 mi
