= Connecticut Route 27 =

State highway in New London County, Connecticut, US

Route 27
- Map of New London County in southeastern Connecticut with Route 27 highlighted in red

Route information
- Maintained by CTDOT
- Length: 3.21 mi (5.17 km)
- Existed: 1950–present

Major junctions
- South end: US 1 in Stonington
- I-95 in Stonington
- North end: Route 184 in Groton

Location
- Country: United States
- State: Connecticut
- Counties: New London

Highway system
- Connecticut State Highway System; Interstate; US; State; SSR; SR; Scenic
← Route 25	→ Route 30

Route 27 is a north–south state highway in southeastern Connecticut running for 3.21 miles (5.17 km) from U.S. Route 1 in Mystic (in the town of Stonington) to Route 184 in Old Mystic (in the town of Groton).

== Route description ==
Route 27 begins at an intersection with US 1 in the village of Mystic, within the town of Stonington. It begins as Denison Avenue and continues as Greenmanville Avenue. It passes by the Mystic Seaport and Old Mystic Village and then crosses I-95 at exit 101. North of I-95 it becomes Whitehall Avenue then becomes Main Street as it runs through the village of Old Mystic in the town of Groton. Route 27 ends a short distance later at an intersection with Route 184.

Route 27 from the intersection of Jerry Browne Road (milepost 2.13) in Stonington to the Route 184 terminus (milepost 3.21) in Groton is a state designated scenic road. This portion of the route provides a view to the Mystic River, which it closely parallels.

== History ==
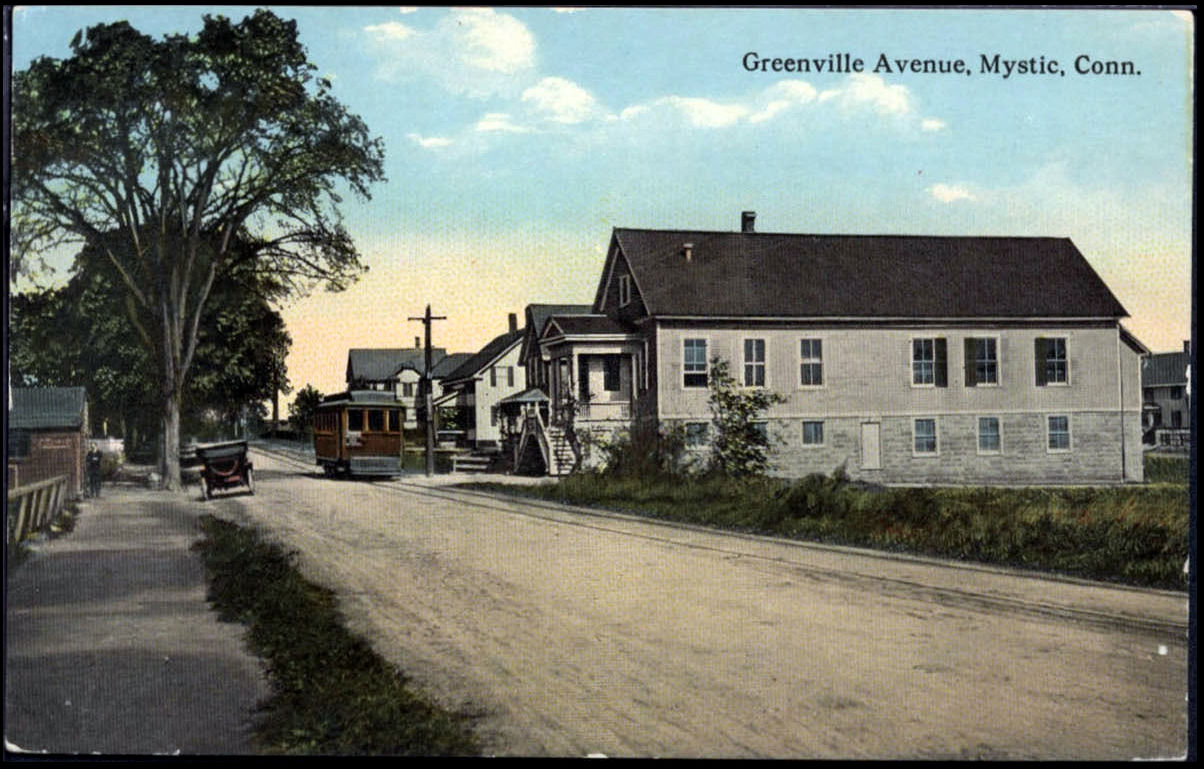
A Groton and Stonington Street Railway trolley on Greenmanville Avenue around 1910

The road along the east bank of the Mystic River, connecting the villages of Mystic and Old Mystic, was a secondary state highway in the 1920s, with designation Highway 344. In the 1932 state highway renumbering, old Highway 344 was renumbered to Route 169. In 1950, a new state highway was established, Route 27, which connected the village of Poquetanuck in the town of Preston (at Route 12), through Ledyard Center, to Burnetts Corner in Groton (at Route 184).

Route 27 was established in 1950, running from Route 12 in Ledyard to Route 184. The old Route 27 followed the path of the Colonel Ledyard Highway. By the following year, Route 27 was extended along old Route 169 via a short overlap with Route 184. As a result of the 1961 Route Reclassification Act, the part of old Route 27 north of Route 184 was deleted in 1963, leading to its current configuration.

== Junction list ==
The entire route is in New London County.

Location	mi	km	Destinations	Notes
Stonington	0.00	0.00	US 1 – Center Groton, Stonington	Southern terminus
Stonington	1.74	2.80	I-95 – Providence, New London	Exit 101 on I-95
Stonington	2.71	4.36	Route 234 east – Stonington	Western terminus of Route 234
Groton	3.21	5.17	Route 184 – North Stonington, Center Groton	Northern terminus
1.000 mi = 1.609 km; 1.000 km = 0.621 mi
