= Interurban streetcars in Southern New England =

Southern New England at one time had a large network of street railway lines, including several true interurban streetcars. It was possible to go from New York City to Boston completely on streetcars on at least three routes: via Hartford, Connecticut, Springfield, Massachusetts, and Worcester, Massachusetts; via New London, Connecticut and Worcester, or via New London and Providence, Rhode Island.

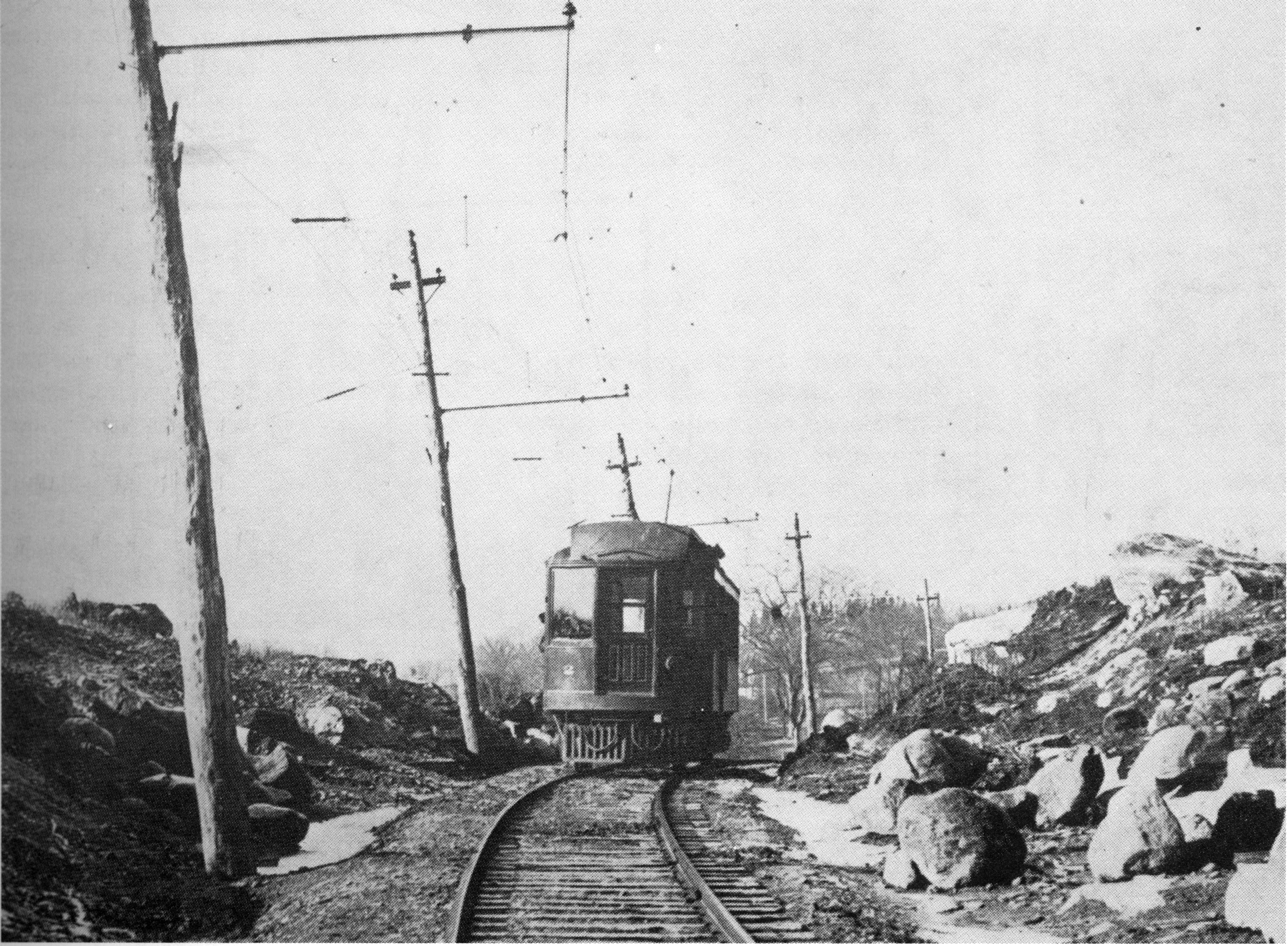
A Shore Line Electric Railway car in Madison, Connecticut in 1911

The majority of streetcar lines in Southern New England ran in mixed traffic on city streets in downtown areas and alongside local highways between towns. Only a smaller number of lines had significant interurban characteristics, including long stretches of private rights of way and roadside reservations that supported operations at speeds far higher than street traffic; most were located in relatively uncrowded Eastern Connecticut with longer distances between population centers.

For a brief period from 1916 to 1919, the Shore Line Electric Railway - later called "one of the few New England electric lines of genuine interurban technology" - owned all these interurban-type lines. They included the Groton and Stonington Street Railway, the Norwich and Westerly Railway, and the New London Division of the Connecticut Company. Due to competition from automobiles, all were abandoned between 1920 and 1940.

Currently, the only services that come close to the definition of an interurban are two sections of the MBTA rapid transit system in Boston, both converted commuter rail routes rather than original interurbans. The Green Line D branch (formerly the Boston & Albany Railroad's Highland branch) was converted in 1959 and runs modern light rail equipment; the Ashmont–Mattapan High Speed Line was converted in 1929 and runs historic PCC streetcars.
