= Connecticut Route 234 =

State highway in New London County, Connecticut, US

Route 234
- Map of New London County in southeastern Connecticut with Route 234 highlighted in red

Route information
- Maintained by CTDOT
- Length: 6.95 mi (11.18 km)
- Existed: 1987–present

Major junctions
- West end: Route 27 in Stonington
- I-95 in Stonington
- East end: US 1 in Stonington

Location
- Country: United States
- State: Connecticut
- Counties: New London

Highway system
- Connecticut State Highway System; Interstate; US; State; SSR; SR; Scenic
← Route 229	→ Route 243

Route 234 is a state highway in southeastern Connecticut, running entirely within the town of Stonington. It connects the Old Mystic section of town with the village of Pawcatuck.

== Route description ==
Route 234 begins at an intersection with Route 27 in the Old Mystic section of the town of Stonington. It heads southeast across central Stonington, crossing over I-95 without an intersection after 2.4 miles (3.9 km), before turning east to an interchange with I-95 (at Exit 104) after another mile. Route 234 then continues east another 3.5 miles (5.6 km) to end at an intersection with US 1 in the Pawcatuck section of Stonington. Route 234 is known as the Pequot Trail for its entire length.

The section of Route 234 from the western terminus to the intersection with North Main Street is designated as a state scenic road.

== History ==
Modern Route 234 (Pequot Trail) was first designated as a numbered state highway in the 1932 state highway renumbering. It was originally the eastern half of the newly established Route 84 (now modern Route 184). Route 84 was relocated in 1935 to the Providence-New London Turnpike, and the Pequot Trail reverted to town control. In 1963, the current Route 234 was taken over by the state again as unsigned State Road 645. It was redesignated as Route 234 in 1987.

== Junction list ==
The entire route is in Stonington, New London County.

mi	km	Destinations	Notes
0.00	0.00	Route 27 – Old Mystic, Mystic	Western terminus
2.46	3.96	I-95 – New London, Providence	Exit 104 on I-95
6.95	11.18	US 1 – Stonington, Westerly	Eastern terminus
1.000 mi = 1.609 km; 1.000 km = 0.621 mi
