= Shore Line Electric Railway =

The Shore Line Electric Railway was a trolley line along the southern coastline of Connecticut, running between New Haven and Old Saybrook with additional branches to Chester and Stony Creek. Unlike most trolley lines in New England, the Shore Line Electric was a true interurban, running large railway-style cars largely on a private right-of-way rather than on public streets. Though its main line was in operation for only 15 nonconsecutive years, the Shore Line Electric briefly acquired a substantial network of trolley lines stretching across eastern Connecticut, including the Norwich and Westerly Railway, the Groton and Stonington Street Railway, and several lines of the Connecticut Company. Most of the trolley line no longer is extant, however, the Shore Line Electric Railway Power House still stands along the mouth of the Connecticut River in Old Saybrook.

== Route ==
=== New Haven–Old Saybrook ===
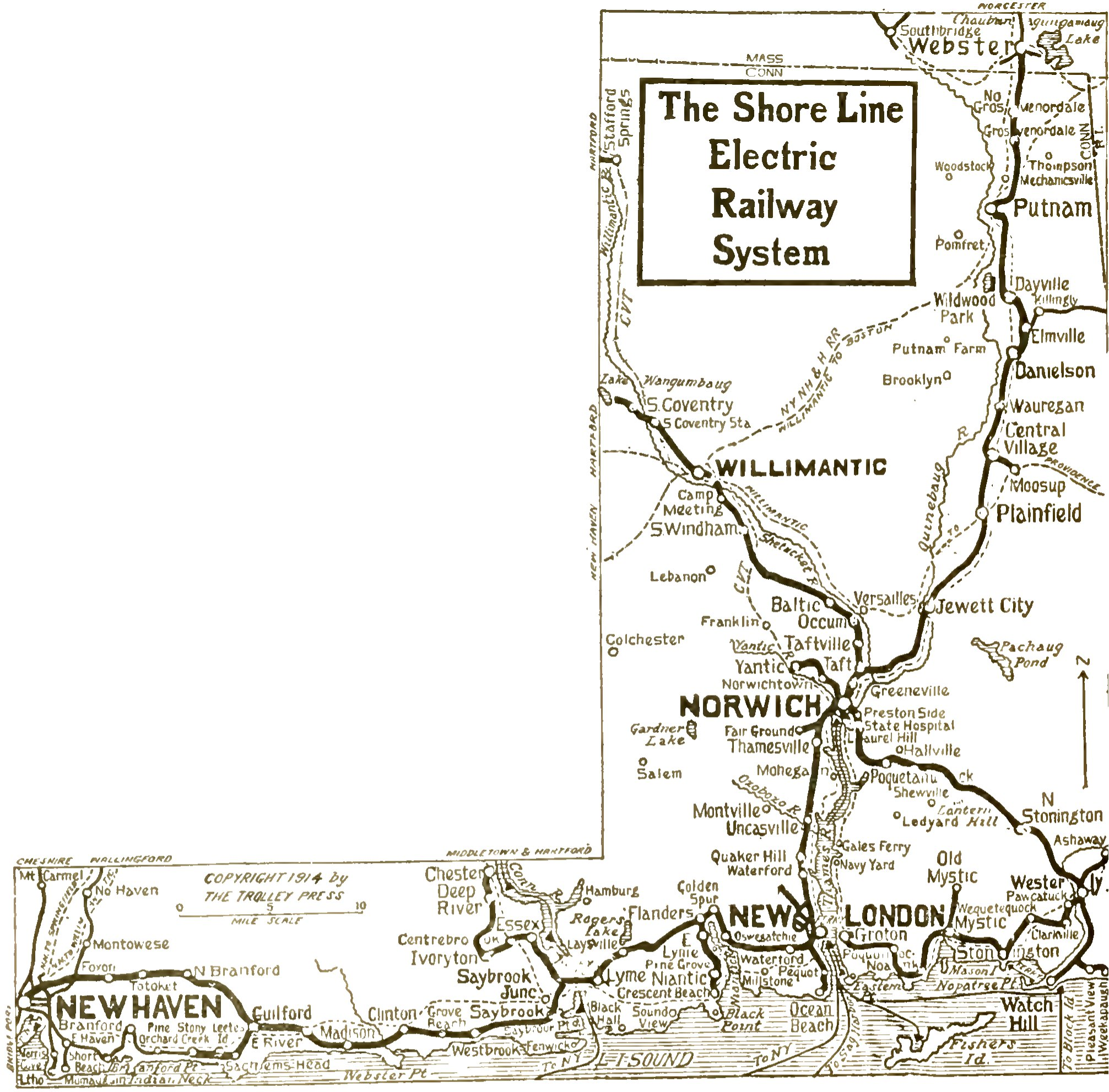
Map of the Shore Line Electric Railway at its largest extent in 1914, showing the original route and branches as well as the 1913 purchases of the New London Division and other lines

The line began at the New Haven Green at the intersection of Church and Chapel Streets. It ran for two miles on trackage belonging to local lines of the Connecticut Company east on Chapel Street and then north on State Street. At Ferry Street in Fair Haven, the line shifted to its own tracks running on Middletown Avenue and Foxon Boulevard (CT-80). In East Haven the line separated from roads and ran on a private right-of-way through North Branford to the outskirts of Guilford, where it merged onto local roads to the town green and the junction with the branch to Stony Creek. East of Guilford the line ran on a short private section before following the Boston Post Road (Route 1) over the New Haven Railroad tracks and through Madison, Connecticut. It crossed the Hammonasset River on a private bridge then rejoined Route 1 into downtown Clinton. After Clinton the line stayed mostly on a private right-of-way through Westbrook until rejoining Route 1 at Saybrook Manor. It followed what is now Old Boston Post Road for a short way, then Main Street (CT-154) to downtown Old Saybrook.

=== Old Saybrook–Chester ===
From Old Saybrook (Saybrook Junction), the line to Chester rose onto the 330-foot concrete Fenwick Viaduct over the Valley Railroad extension to Fenwick, then onto Ragged Rock Road where the still-extant carhouse is located. The line crossed over the New Haven Railroad on a steel bridge and followed a private right of way to Ferry Street, where after 1913 connections were available over the old Baldwin Bridge to the New London and East Lyme Street Railway. From there the line ran on a private right-of-way to Essex, then over streets and a curved private way over the Valley Railroad into Centerbrook. The line followed Main Street (CT-602) to Ivoryton, then a private alignment which merged with the Middlesex Turnpike (Route 154) just south of Deep River. Trolleys ran along the turnpike through Deep River and into Chester, terminating near Ferry Street.

=== Guilford–Stony Creek ===
Unlike the Chester line, the branch to Stony Creek was wired at a lower voltage than the main line and was operated with different trolleys. From the Guilford green, the line ran west on Water Street (CT-146) then over a private section before turning south, crossing Water Street on the 240-foot concrete Mulberry Viaduct and the New Haven Railroad on a steel bridge. The line ran on a private alignment south through Sachems Head and then west along the shoreline through Leetes Island to Stony Creek. At Stony Creek, the line met with the Branford Electric Railway line (owned by the Connecticut Company) which ran to New Haven via East Haven proper.

== History ==
The Shore Line Electric Railway was chartered by the Connecticut General Assembly in 1905 and was authorized to lay tracks, build bridges, erect power poles, and to build powerhouses and trolley barns. Morton F. Plant, a railroad heir and entrepreneur, offered financial assistance, investing heavily in the railway, and eventually took control of the operation. His assistance made possible continued construction of the railway, which eventually was completed in 1910. The section north of Old Saybrook opened to Ivoryton and Deep River in 1912 and Chester in 1914.

In 1913, the SLERy made three major acquisitions. First, it leased the New London and East Lyme Street Railway and built a branch from Flanders along Route 1 and over the Connecticut River bridge to meet the main line at Saybrook.

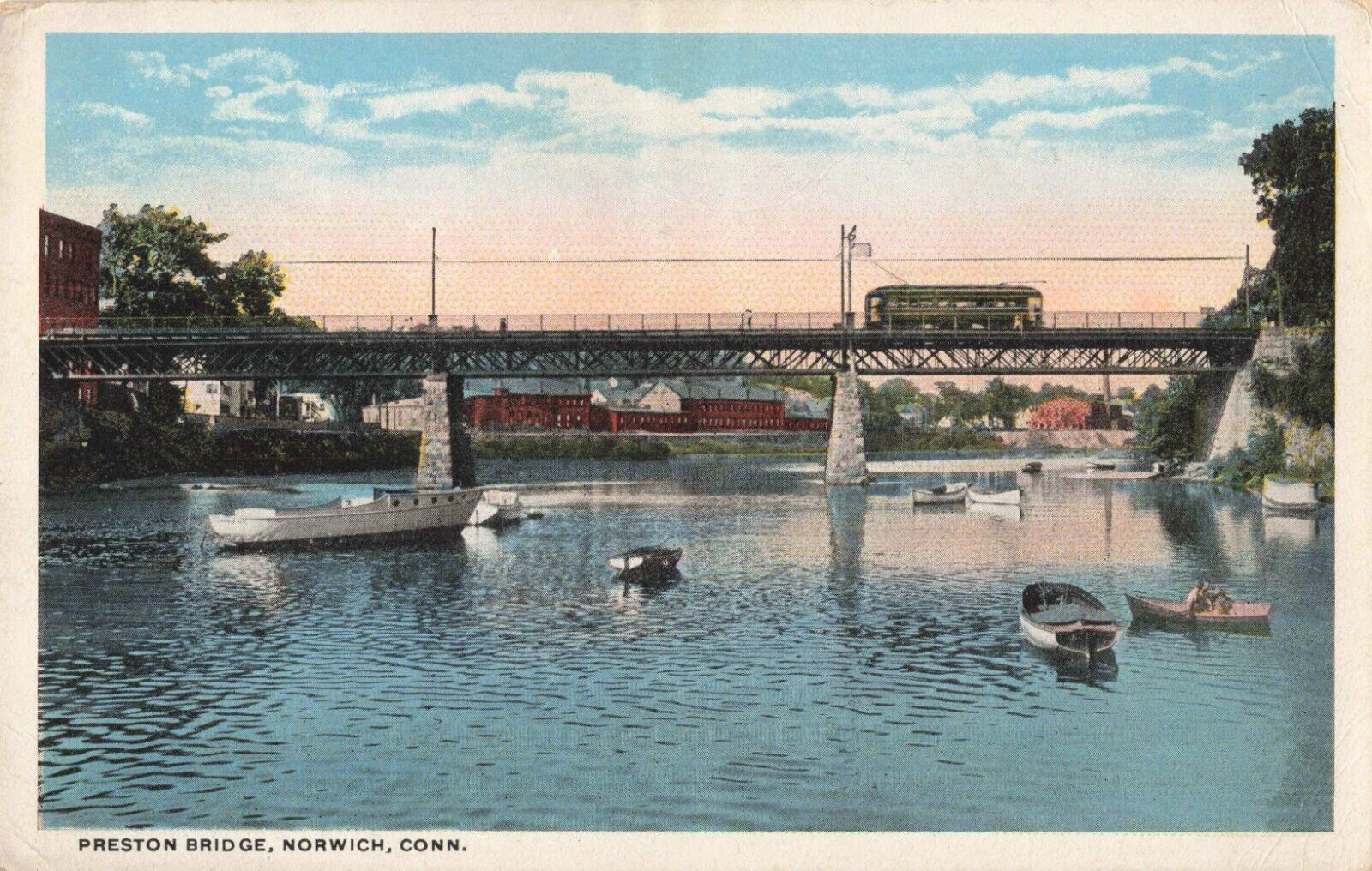
A Norwich and Westerly trolley in 1917, during its control by the Shore Line

The same year, the company purchased the Norwich and Westerly Railway system, which represented 60 miles of lines including the Norwich-Westerly line; branches from Westerly to Watch Hill, Weekapaug, and Ashaway; and the N&W-owned Groton and Stonington Street Railway and its Old Mystic branch.

Finally, the company acquired the Connecticut Company's New London division, which was disconnected from the other Connecticut Company lines. The New London division included rural main lines from New London through Norwich to North Grosvenordale (with a connection to Worcester via the Worcester Consolidated Street Railway) and from Norwich to Coventry via Willimantic; local lines in New London including a line to Ocean Beach; local lines in Norwich including a line to Yantic; and branches from Elmville to East Killingly (with a connection to Providence via the Rhode Island Company's Providence and Danielson Street Railway) and from Central Village to Moosup. This gave the Shore Line control over a network of almost 300 miles of lines, representing a monopoly on trolley service in the eastern part of the state.

After several crashes in 1917 and 1919, the SLERy went into receivership in October 1919 following a strike in July. The New London division was reacquired by the Connecticut Company; some lines like the Norwich and Westerly continued operation, but the Shore Line itself was shut down until 1923. The section east of Guilford was replaced by buses in 1928, and the whole line abandoned by 1929.

== Power House ==
- Shore Line Electric Railway Power House
- U.S. National Register of Historic Places
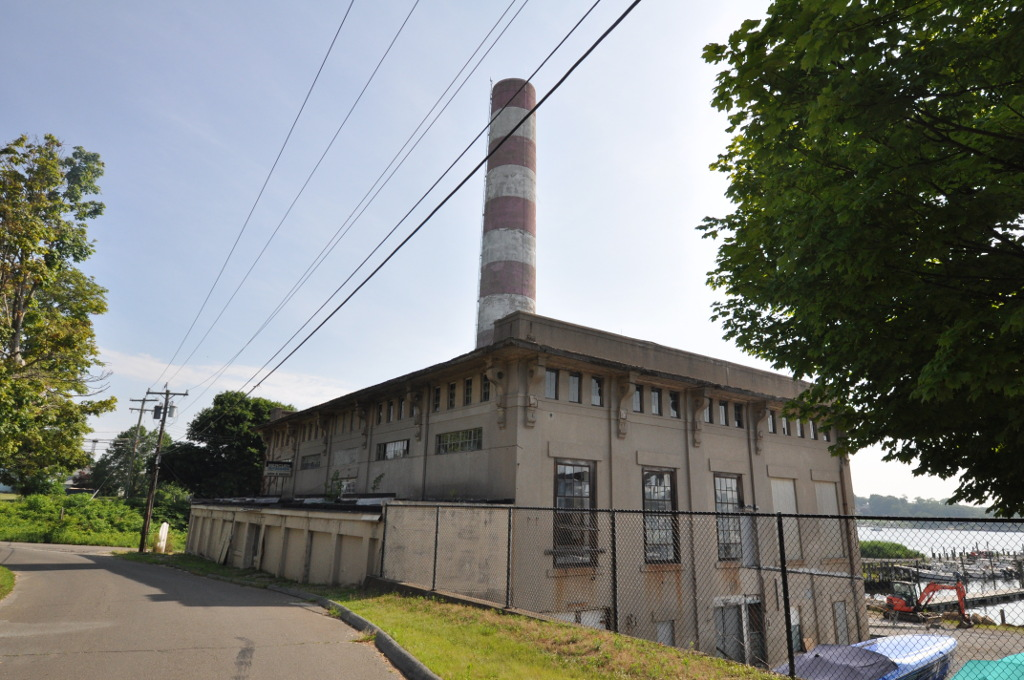
- Shore Line Electric Railway Power House

- Location within Connecticut Location within the United States
- Location: 5 Clark Street, Old Saybrook, Connecticut
- Coordinates: 41.31297°N 72.35335°W
- Area: 0.8 acres (0.32 ha)
- Built: 1910
- Architectural style: Industrial, Classical and Arts and Crafts
- NRHP reference No.: 100004086
- Added to NRHP: June 20, 2019

The Shore Line Electric Railway Power House was constructed as a coal-fueled electric powerhouse along the Connecticut River from 1908 to 1910. The riverfront location provided a source of water to cool the condensing units and enabled easy access of coal deliveries by boat. Hoppers rested on shore to accommodate coal delivery. The Power House's primary purpose was to supply power to the Shore Line Electric Railway, though it eventually provided regional current to additional railways and bridges. At the time of its construction the Power House supplied current to the Shore Line Electric Railway and the New London and East Lyme Railway; it also furnished power for the operation of the Connecticut River Bridge, south of the Power House. The water for the boiler feed was obtained from a reservoir constructed approximately one mile west of the Power House.

The two-story, reinforced-concrete building initially consisted of two 1,500-kilowatt, 100 percent power factor, three-phase, 25-cycle vertical Curtis steam turbines. The turbines operated at 160 pounds of steam pressure and delivered 11,000 volts. The original layout of the building provided for the installation of two additional units in the future. Additionally, coal-fueled powerhouse interiors required a partially open floor plan with exposed space from floor to ceiling. The open space facilitated the use of large equipment and machinery, as well as interior hopper systems to assist movement of coal. There were three 625 H.P. Bigelow-Hornsby boilers, which operated at a working pressure of 165 pounds. The alternators generated current at 11,000 volts, three-phase, 25-cycle, which was transmitted partly along the railway company's trolley poles and partly along an independent pole line extending from the Power House to a substation in Guilford. The conductors were three #2 B. & S. hard-drawn copper wires; the total length of the transmission line was approximately 21 miles. The Power House provided electricity to the Shore Line Electric Railway for the duration of its operation.

In 1938 the Power House was sold to Whitney Stueck and Fred Sturgis, who operated the Saybrook Yacht Yard at the site through 1946. The yacht-building operation was known for its Blue Jays, a beginner's competitive yacht. Sturgis served in World War II from 1943 to 1945. Upon returning, he bought out Stueck's share in the Saybrook Yacht Yard and relocated the operation to neighboring Old Lyme. Subsequently, the Power House and surrounding site became a boat repair operations between 1949 and 1961. It currently serves as a mixed-use marina and office space. The building was listed in the National Register of Historic Places on June 20, 2019.
