= Oswegatchie =

Oswegatchie may refer to:

In New York

- Oswegatchie, New York, a town in St. Lawrence County
- Oswegatchie, a hamlet in the town of Fine, New York
- Oswegatchie River, a tributary of the Saint Lawrence River
- Oswegatchie people, a native people of northern New York
- Fort Oswegatchie, subsequent name of Fort de La Présentation
- Oswegatchie Corners, a location in the town of Diana, New York

Elsewhere

- Oswegatchie Historic District, a location in the town of Waterford, Connecticut
