= Norwich and Westerly Railway =

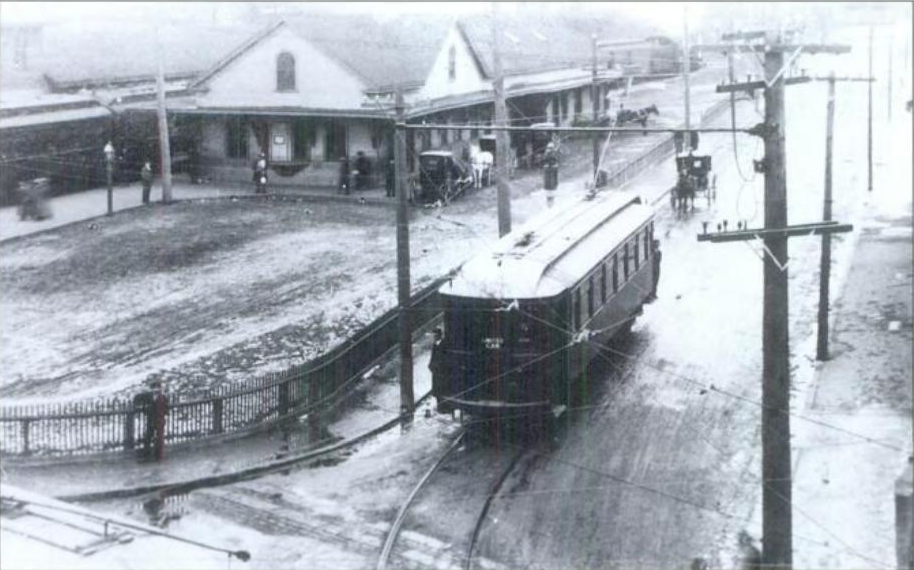
- N&W trolley at Westerly station between 1906 and 1912

Overview
- Status: abandoned
- Locale: Southeastern Connecticut
- Termini: Norwich; Westerly

Service
- Type: interurban

History
- Opened: August 18, 1906
- Closed: December 31, 1922

Technical
- Line length: 21.6 miles
- Character: Private right-of-way
- Electrification: Overhead line, 370 V DC
Route map
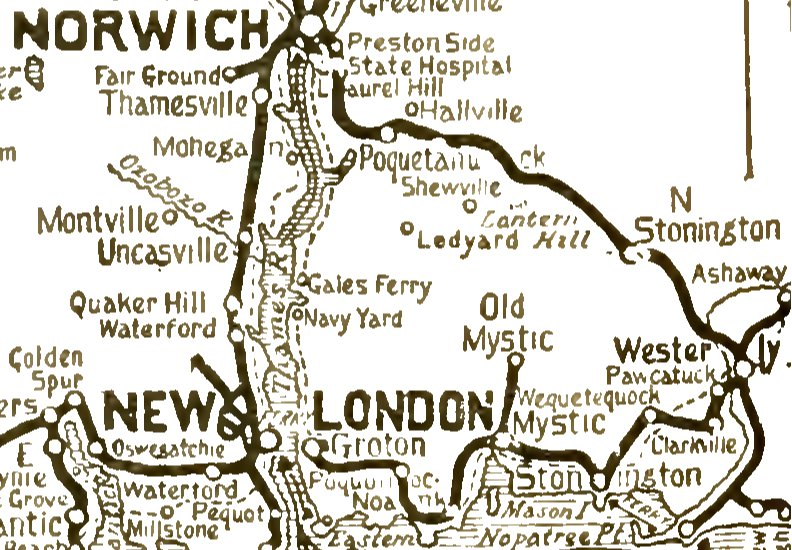
Map of Shore Line Electric Railway including the Norwich & Westerly

The Norwich and Westerly Railway was an interurban trolley system that operated in Southeastern Connecticut during the early part of the 20th century. It operated a 21-mile line through rural territory in Norwich, Preston, Ledyard, North Stonington, and Pawcatuck, Connecticut to Westerly, Rhode Island between 1906 and 1922. For most of its length, the route paralleled what is now Connecticut Route 2.

Stops on the line included Norwich (at the railroad depot on Main Street), Norwich State Hospital, Poquetanuck, Hallville, North Stonington, and Westerly. The powerhouse and 4-track carhouse were located at Hallville, as was a trolley park called Lincoln Park.

== History ==
The company was first chartered on May 11, 1903 as the Norwich, Mystic & Westerly Street Railway Company. The name was changed to the Norwich & Westerly Railway Company on December 12, 1905 after the Groton and Stonington Street Railway's Old Mystic branch negated the need for a N&W branch to Mystic. Construction started early in 1906 and the first cars ran between Norwich and Hallville on August 18, 1906, and as far as North Stonington by August 30. The Westerly and Connecticut Railway (wholly owned by the Norwich & Westerly) was chartered in Rhode Island on March 13, 1906 and the first Norwich-Westerly through cars ran on November 12, 1906. The complete trolley line was estimated to cost $500,000.

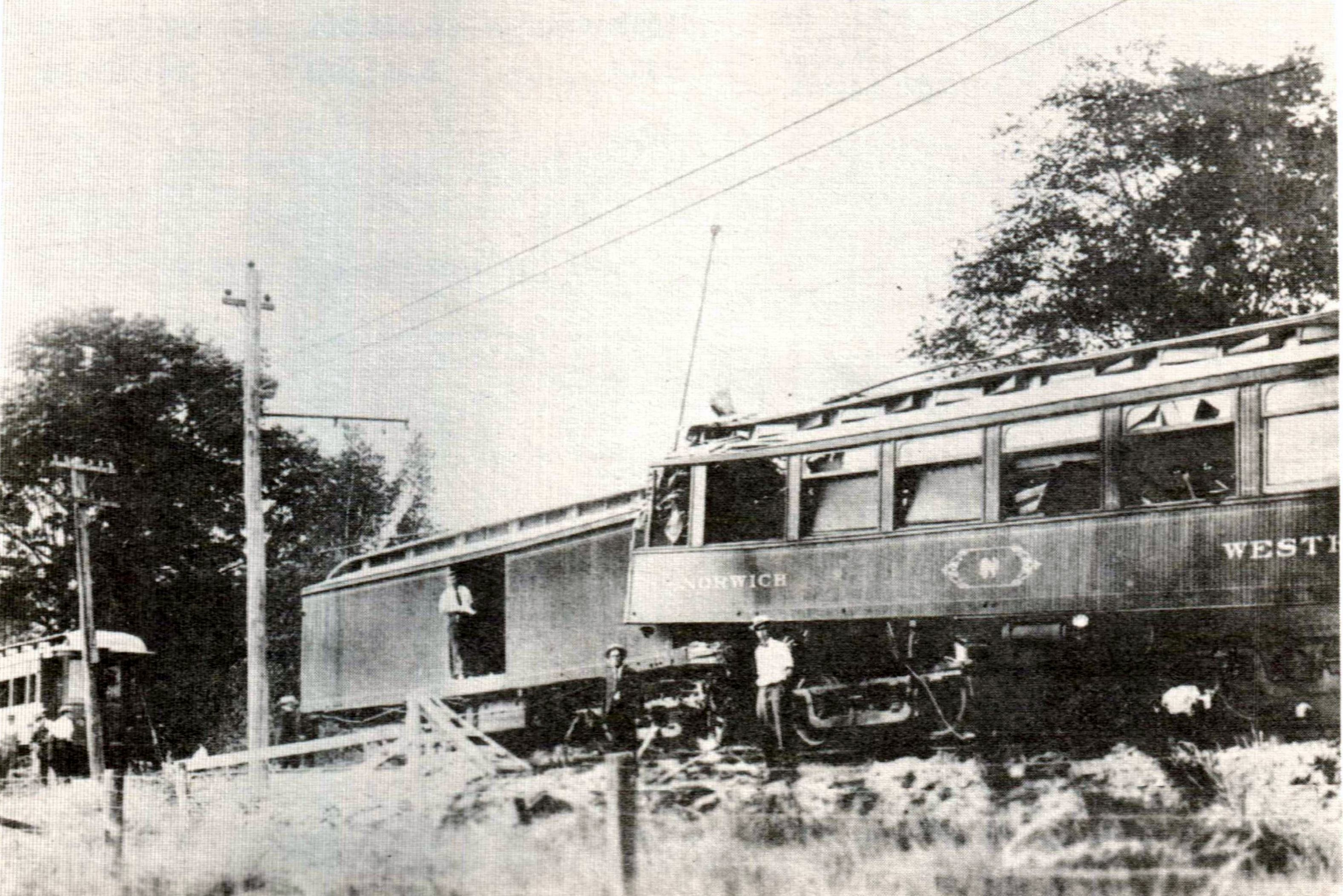
1907 wreck. #2 is on the right and #1 in the middle.

The line's only major accident occurred on August 1, 1907, when passenger car #2 and freight motor #1 collided at Avery's Crossing in North Stonington. Passengers Mr. and Mrs. Benjamin F. Gardiner were killed along #2's motorman, George H. Lucier. Damage claims against the line exceeded $4,000.

By the time of its acquisition by the Shore Line Electric Railway in 1916, the Norwich & Westerly Traction Company operated 59.08 miles of lines. These included the Norwich & Westerly system proper, the Pawcatuck Valley Street Railway, the Ashaway and Westerly Railway, and the Groton & Stonington Street Railway.

Route 2 opened in 1919, providing the first competition to the line. Due to rapidly declining ridership, service on the line ended on December 31, 1922. The rails were ripped up in 1924.

== Construction ==
The line was constructed to high-speed interurban standards, rather than simple street-running track like most other trolley lines in New England. A Street Railway Journal article from April 13, 1907 reported:

As the line was built primarily for high speed operation, curves and grades are few in number. All curves have the outer rail elevated, according to standard steam railroad practice for passenger train speeds. The maximum grade is 4.5 per cent. There are many cuts and fills on the line, some of the former being through rock. This disadvantage was balanced in one way, as it enabled the company to use a great deal of rock ballast.

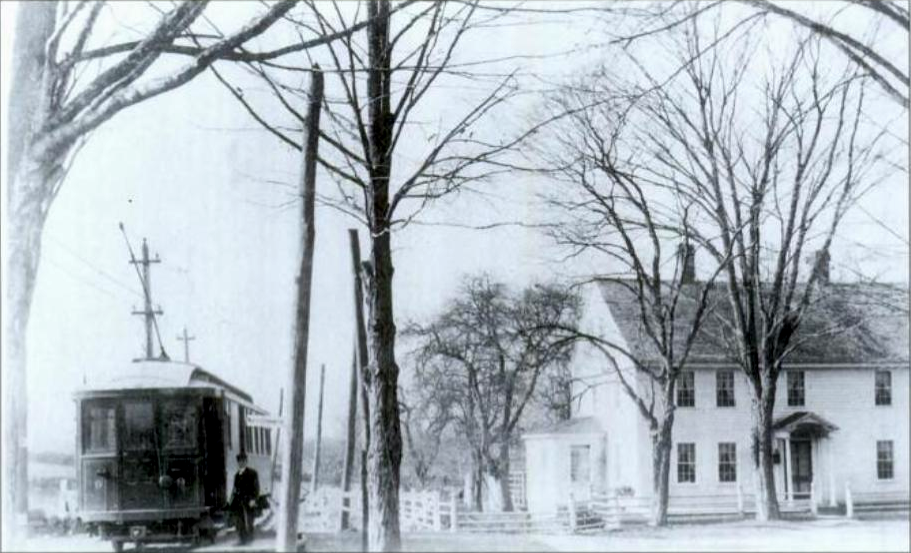
A trolley stopped at North Stonington

Except for short street-running sections near the terminals in Norwich and Westerly, the line was built on a private right-of-way with relatively few grade crossings. Sixty-five percent of the line was straight. Bridges were built over the numerous small streams on the route, as well as the State Line Bridge over the Pawcatuck River at White Rock.

From Franklin Square in Norwich, the tracks ran down Main Street, then turned south onto the dedicated right-of-way. The line skirted Laurel Hill Road (now Route 12) at Norwich State Hospital, then ran parallel to Poquetanuck Road (now Route 2A) to Hallville. From there the line followed Route 2 closely into North Stonington, where the station was located at Main Street and Rocky Hollow Road. The line continued into Pawcatuck, where it veered east across the State Line Bridge and into White Rock, Rhode Island. After crossing Pierce Street in Westerly on a trestle, cars rejoined street traffic at the corner of West and Pleasant Streets. From there, they followed West Street on a bridge over the mainline rail tracks and onto Railroad Avenue to Westerly station, then on Pawcatuck Valley Street Railway trackage on Canal, High, and Broad streets to Dixon House Square and Westerly Public Library.

A short spur ran from the main line around the south side of Norwich State Hospital to the Fort Point railroad station on the Norwich and Worcester Railroad, which was then controlled by the New York, New Haven, and Hartford Railroad.

The Hallville powerhouse produced 16kV three-phase power, which was converted into 370V power for trolley motors at several locations, including a substation in White Rock north of Westerly.

== Operations ==
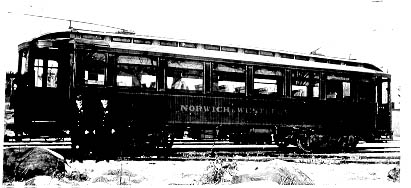
Car #8 photographed with her crew

Equipment consisted of eight passenger trolley cars (semi-convertibles #2,4,6,8 and closed cars #3,5,7,9) and a line car. One motor freight car (#1) and 25 freight trailers were used for freight operations, which included hauling coal to the powerhouse, Norwich State Hospital, and other customers along the trolley line. The freight cars also hauled quartz from the quarry on Lantern Hill.

Although express cars could makes the Norwich-to-Westerly run in just 45 minutes, a normal run was 70 minutes. Service operated as frequently as 30-minute headways. Fares started at 35 cents, divided into 7 fare zones of a nickel each.

The Norwich & Westerly connected at both ends with other streetcar companies. At Norwich, the Norwich Street Railway of the Connecticut Company ran local routes, and lines connected Norwich to New London, Willimantic, and Putnam. At Westerly, many cars continued through on the Pawcatuck Valley Street Railway to Watch Hill or Pleasant View, and connections were available to Ashaway and Groton.

Riders took the trolley for several different purposes. During the summer, many residents would take through cars to the beaches at Watch Hill and Pleasant View. High school students rode the line from in Preston to Wheeler High School. The trolley park at Hallville, Lincoln Park, was open from 1908 to 1911.

== Remains and reuse ==
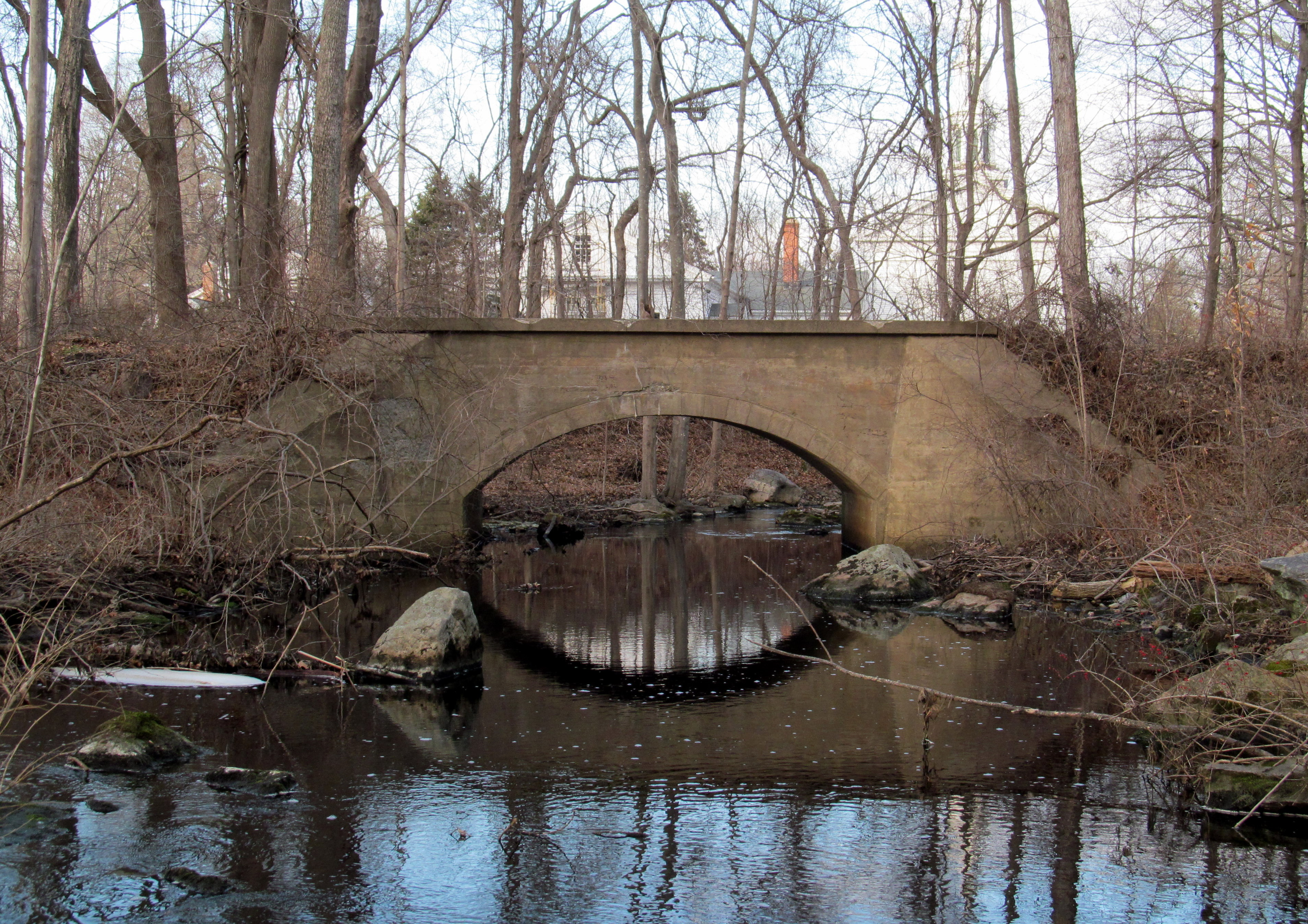
Bridge over Assekonk Brook behind Wheeler High School in North Stonington

The majority of the private right-of-way, totaling 21.02 miles including passing sidings, still exists and is visible on satellite maps. Only at Foxwoods Casino has it been significantly built over; the main entrance road - Trolley Line Boulevard - stands instead. In other places, including Norwich State Hospital and Pawcatuck, the right-of-way is no longer visible where fields and lawns have been plowed. A concrete arch bridge remains in place over Assekonk Brook behind Wheeler High School in North Stonington, and several other bridge abutments remain along the route. Some sections of the State Line Bridge still carry a sidewalk and a pipeline over the Pawcatuck River, although the highway section of the bridge was replaced around 1994. The Hallville powerhouse no longer exists, but the adjacent carhouse now belongs to the Connecticut Brass Company.

Much of the right-of-way has been used for transmission lines since at least the 1940s, which are now owned by Connecticut Light and Power. Those sections, from Lincoln Park Road in Hallville to Mains Crossing in North Stonington, are relatively well-preserved, and old railroad spikes can occasionally be found. During the 2011 Halloween nor'easter, a tree on the lines caused significant outages. During the 1990s, when Foxwoods was being built, the right-of-way was considered for use as a light rail line or busway to reduce traffic on Route 2. However, no transit system was built, and instead sections of Route 2 were widened.
