= New London and East Lyme Street Railway =

Connecticut streetcar line

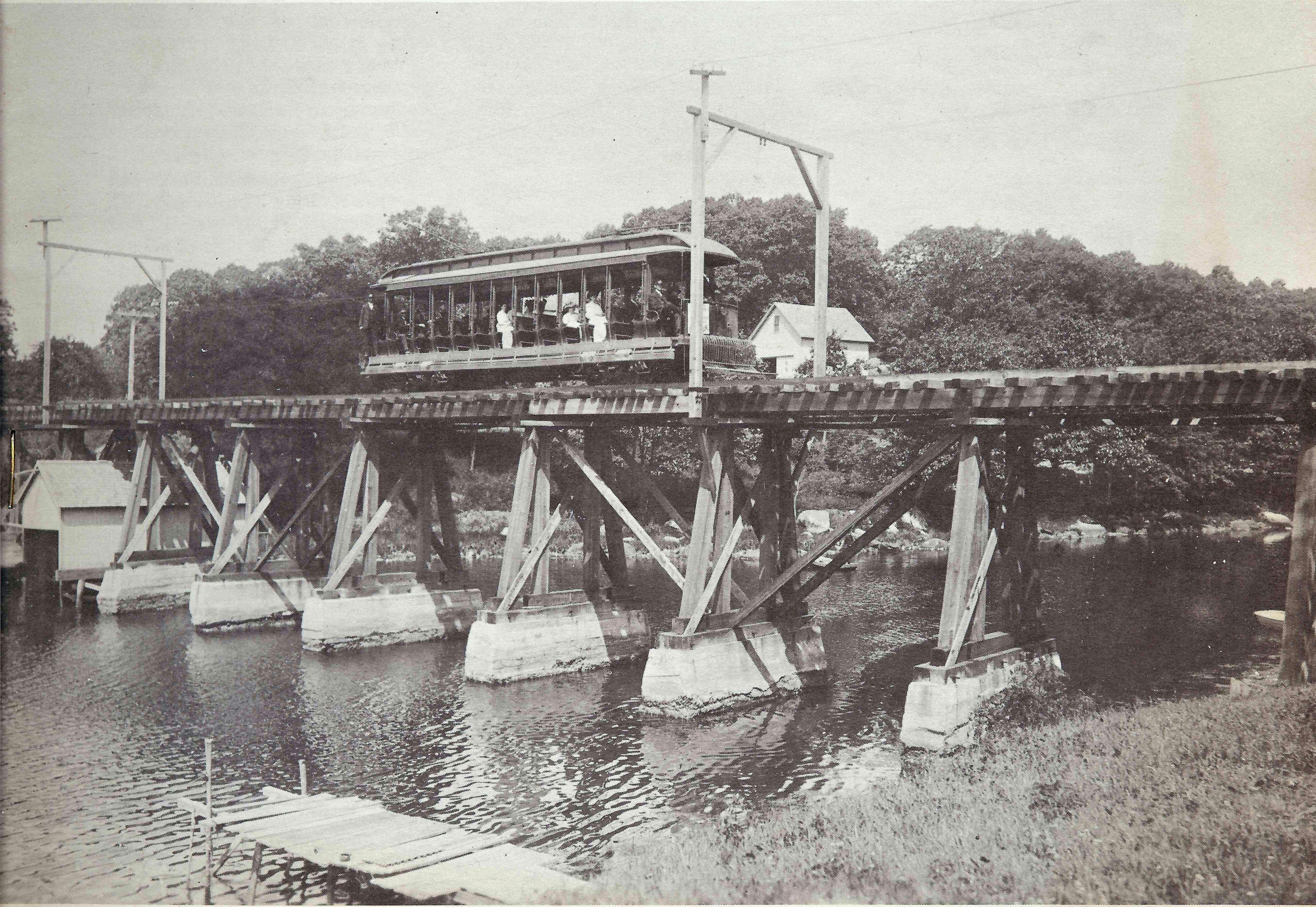
- A NL&EL car crosses the Smith Cove trestle in 1906

Overview
- Status: Abandoned
- Locale: Southeastern Connecticut
- Termini: New London; Niantic Old Saybrook

Service
- Type: Street railway

History
- Opened: October 5, 1905
- Closed: July 11, 1923

Technical
- Character: Street-running
- Electrification: 1200 V DC

The New London and East Lyme Street Railway was a streetcar line that operated in southeastern Connecticut. Its main line ran from New London to Niantic with a later extension to Crescent Beach and a branch to Old Saybrook.

== Route ==
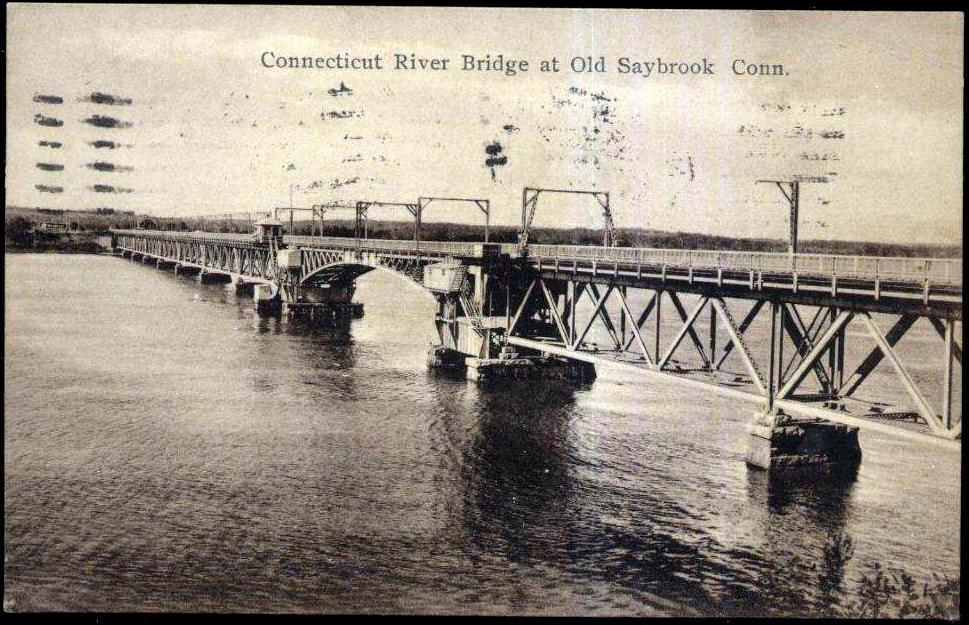
The Connecticut River bridge

The line began at the Parade in downtown New London, adjacent to New London Union Station. Cars ran on trackage rights over Connecticut Company local lines along Bank Street to the beginning of NL&EL trackage at Montauk Avenue. The route ran alongside the Boston Post Road (now U.S. Route 1) to Oswegatchie, where a carhouse was located on Niantic River Road. The line ran south on Niantic River Road, crossed Smith Cove (what is now Keeny Cove) on a high trestle, and followed Oswegatchie Road to where it rejoined the Post Road at Keeney's Corner. At Golden Spur (where the Post Road crossed the Niantic River), the company built the Golden Spur Amusement Park to draw weekend ridership. From Flanders Four Corners, the line ran south along Flanders Road (now CT-161) to the New Haven Railroad's Niantic station on Main Street (CT-156) in downtown Niantic. From Montauk Avenue to Niantic, the company operated 11.00 miles (17.70 km) of main track and 0.14 miles (0.23 km) of passing sidings.

The extension to Crescent Beach added 1.00 mile (1.61 km) of main track, running along Main Street and Black Point Road to near the Crescent Beach station. Trolley wire was erected over the freight siding to the Connecticut National Guard camp in Niantic, with trolleys providing 'less-than-carload freight' service.

The branch to Old Lyme followed the Post Road from Flanders Four Corners to Old Lyme, then over the Connecticut River bridge where it met with the Shore Line Electric Railway. The branch added 11.27 miles (18.14 km)of main track and 0.28 miles (0.45 km) of passing sidings.

== History ==
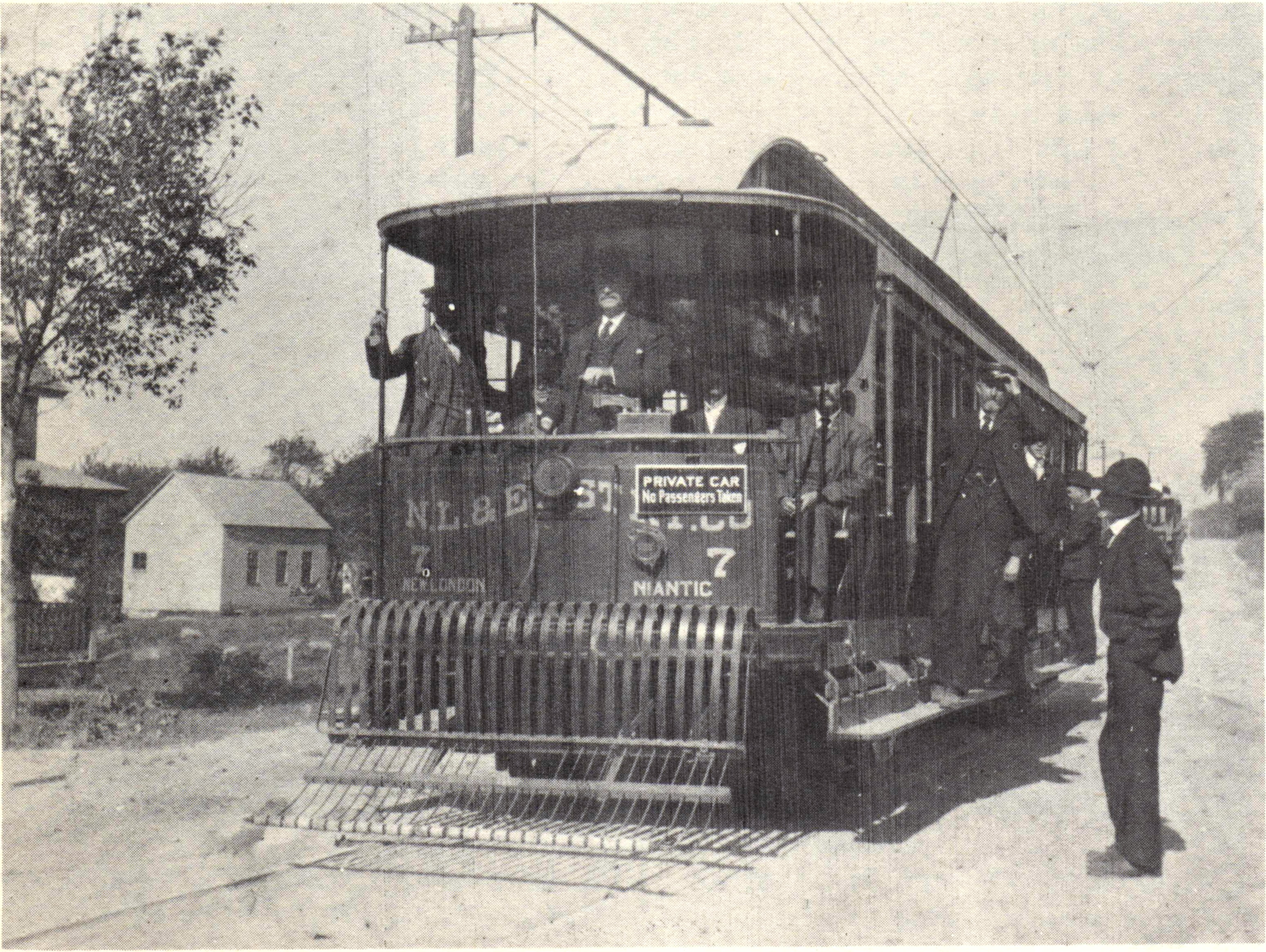
An inspection trip on the first day of service in 1905

The main portion of the line opened on October 5, 1905. The line was extended to Crescent Beach in 1912. In 1913, it was acquired by the Shore Line Electric Railway (SLERy) and extended to Old Lyme.

The SLERy system was shut down by a strike on July 16, 1919. Some portions of the system, including the New London–Crescent Beach portion of the NL&EL, resumed operation beginning on July 30. The western portion of the system, including the Flanders Corner–Old Lyme portion of the NL&EL, was effectively abandoned at that time. The SLERy entered receivership on October 1, 1919. On April 1, 1920, the Connecticut Company (ConnCo) assumed control of its Eastern Connecticut lines, which had been leased to the SLERy since 1913. The ConnCo also began operating the New London–Crescent Beach line at that time, using SLERy cars based out of the ConnCo's New London carhouse.

Service was cut back to Flanders Corner on September 7, 1920, as residents of Niantic and Crescent Beach declined to subsidize the line. It was further cut back to Keeney's Corner on January 1, 1923. Motor buses took over most service on May 23, 1923, with streetcars making only a handful of peak hour trips. Streetcar service ended on July 12, 1923; the bus service ran until February 11, 1924.
