= Groton Bank Historic District =

Historic district in Connecticut, United States

- U.S. National Register of Historic Places
- U.S. Historic district
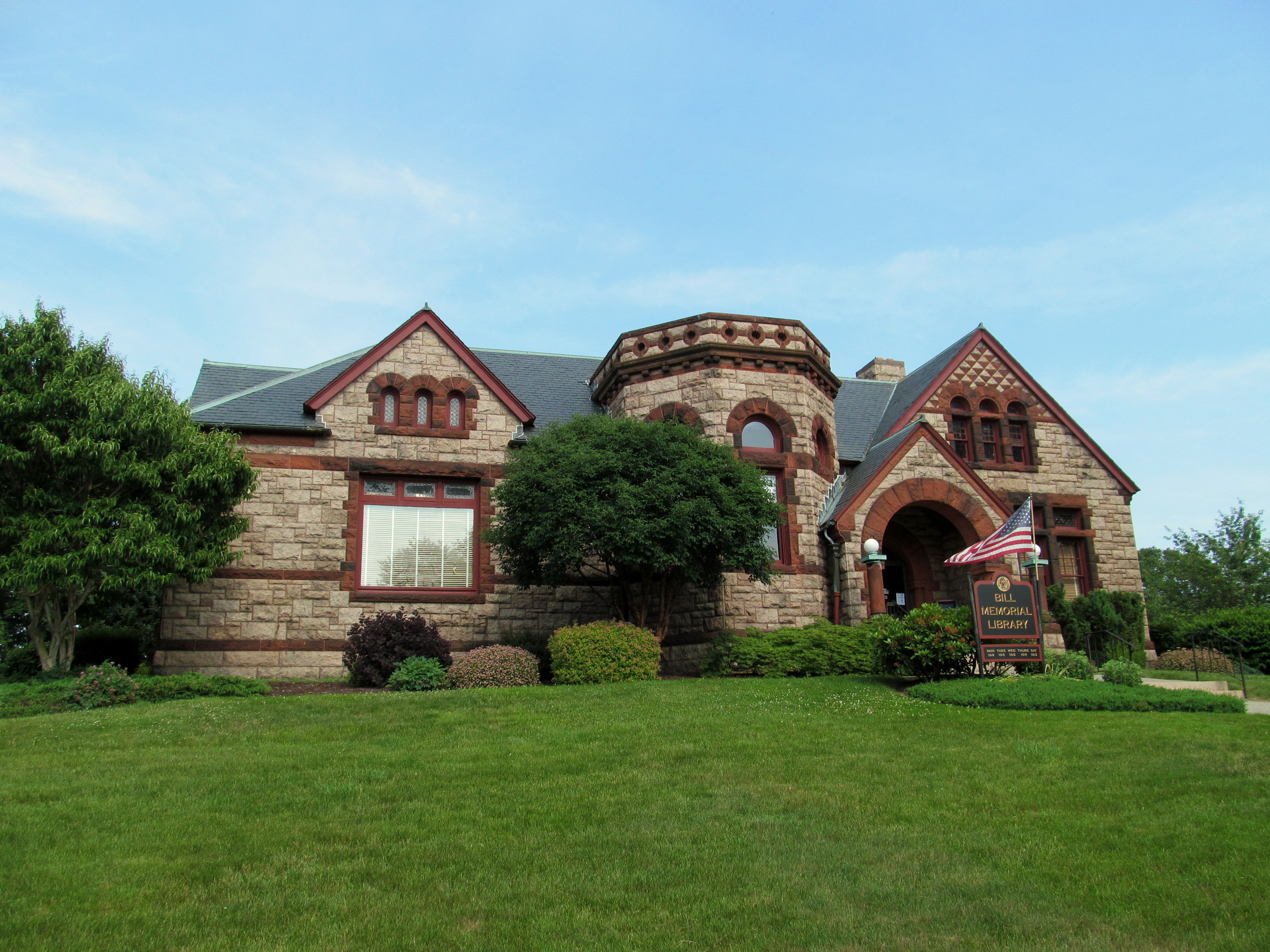
- Bill Memorial Library, designed by Stephen C. Earle, is a contributing property in the district

- Location within Connecticut Location within the United States
- Location: Roughly bounded by the Thames River, Broad, Cottage, and Latham Streets, Groton, Connecticut
- Coordinates: 41°21′24″N 72°4′55″W
- Area: 50 acres (20 ha)
- Architect: Multiple
- Architectural style: Mixed (more than 2 styles from different periods)
- NRHP reference No.: 83001287
- Added to NRHP: March 24, 1983

The Groton Bank Historic District, commonly known as Groton Heights, is a primarily residential 50-acre (20 ha) historic district in the City of Groton (within the Town of Groton) in Connecticut. The district was added to the National Register of Historic Places on March 24, 1983.

The district has an inverted U-shape formed by Thames, Broad, and Monument Streets, and its boundaries are based on an 1868 map to include an area developed mostly during 1820–1860, reflecting a period of growth when Groton was a significant whaling and shipbuilding center. Groton was settled by English colonists in the mid-17th century, but it has few remaining colonial-era structures, since many were destroyed during the Battle of Groton Heights in the American Revolutionary War. A number of post-independence 18th-century houses survive, including the Major Noyes Barber house, built in 1810, which is a Federal style structure.

The district contains a cross-section of architectural styles from its periods of growth. The Groton Heights Baptist Church was built in 1878 and is an example of Italianate architecture, and the Thomas Miner House on Monument Street, built about 1894, is an example of Queen Anne architecture. Non-residential buildings in the district include a number of late 19th-century commercial blocks on Thames Street, as well as the Bill Memorial Library, a high-style example of Richardsonian Romanesque design by Stephen C. Earle.

== See also ==
- Fort Griswold State Park, located just south of the district
- National Register of Historic Places listings in New London County, Connecticut
