= New London County, Connecticut =

County in Connecticut, United States

- County of Connecticut
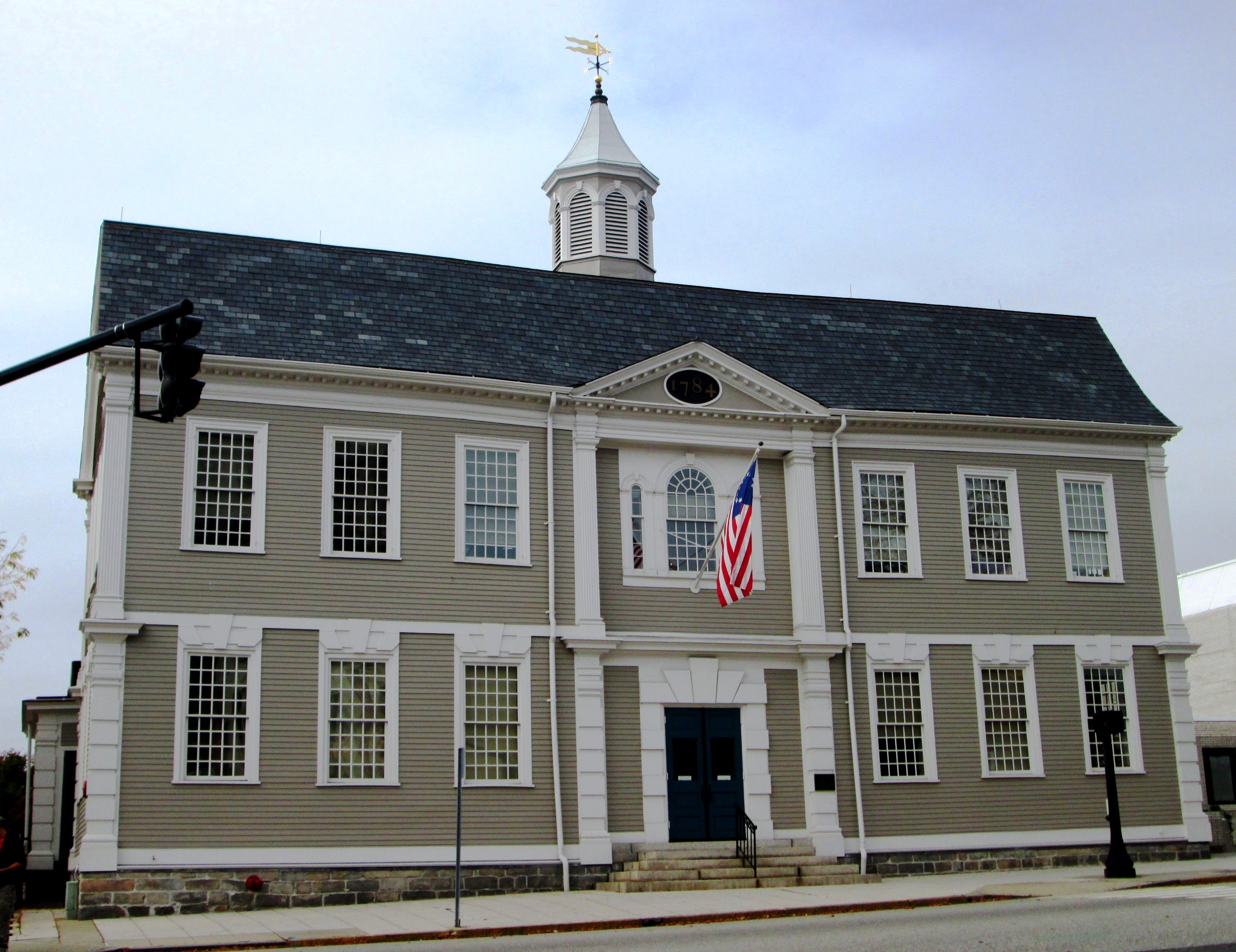
- Former New London County Courthouse

- Location within the U.S. state of Connecticut
- Coordinates: 41°28′N 72°06′W
- Country: United States
- State: Connecticut
- Founded: 1646 by John Winthrop, Jr.
- Named for: London, England
- Seat: none (since 1960); New London (before 1960)
- Largest city: Norwich

Area
  - Total: 772 sq mi (2,000 km^{2})
  - Land: 665 sq mi (1,720 km^{2})
  - Water: 107 sq mi (280 km^{2}) 13.8%

Population (2020)
  - Total: 268,555 ▼
  - Density: 403.8/sq mi (155.9/km^{2})
- Time zone: UTC−5 (Eastern)
  - Summer (DST): UTC−4 (EDT)
- Congressional district: 2nd

Interactive map of New London County, Connecticut

New London County is a county in the southeastern corner of Connecticut and comprises the Norwich-New London, Connecticut Metropolitan Statistical Area, which is also included in the Hartford-East Hartford, Connecticut Combined Statistical Area. There is no county government and no county seat, as is the case with all eight of Connecticut's counties; towns are responsible for all local government activities, including fire and rescue, snow removal, and schools.

New London County contains reservations of four of the five state-recognized Indigenous tribes, although the Paugassett were historically located farther west. The population was 268,555 as of the 2020 census.

On June 6, 2022, the U.S. Census Bureau formally recognized Connecticut's nine councils of governments as county equivalents instead of the state's eight counties. Connecticut's county governments were disbanded in 1960, and the councils of governments took over some of the local governmental functions. Connecticut's eight historical counties continue to exist in name only, and are no longer considered for statistical purposes.

== History ==
Southeastern New England was dominated by the Pequot people at the time of English colonization. They spoke the Mohegan-Pequot language and were one of the Algonquian-speaking tribes in the coastal areas. After years of conflict, the Colonists and their Indian allies defeated the Pequots in the Pequot War of 1637, ending their dominance. Two descendant Pequot tribes are recognized by the state today, as are three other tribes.

New London County was one of four original counties in Connecticut that were established on May 10, 1666, by an act of the Connecticut General Court, which states:

This Court orders that from the Paukatuck River w^{th}
Norridge to y^{e} west bounds of Homonoscet Plantation (Note: The Hammonasset River still bears this Indian place name.) shalbe
for future one County, w^{ch} County is called the County of
N: London. And it is ordered that the County Court shalbe
held at N. London the first Wednesday in June and the third
Thursday in September yearly.

New London County in 1666 consisted of the towns of Stonington, Norwich, New London, and Saybrook. The "Homonoscet Plantation" was settled in March 1663, at first as Kenilworth, but was incorporated as the town of Killingworth in 1667. Several new towns were incorporated and added to New London over the next few decades: Preston in 1687, Colchester in 1699, and Lebanon in 1700. The settlements along the Quinebaug Valley were placed in New London County in 1697, and incorporated as Plainfield in 1699. By 1717, more towns were established in northeastern Connecticut and added to New London County between the Quinebaug Valley and the Rhode Island border.

Windham County was constituted from Hartford and New London counties on May 12, 1726, consisting of towns in northeastern Connecticut. New London County lost the towns of Voluntown, Pomfret, Killingly, Canterbury, Plainfield, and Lebanon to the newly formed county. In 1785, Middlesex County was constituted, consisting of towns along the lower Connecticut River Valley, taking away the towns of Killingworth and Saybrook from New London County. Several additional boundary adjustments took place in the 19th century: the establishment of the town of Marlborough in 1803, the transfer of the town of Lebanon from Windham County in 1824, and the transfer of the town of Voluntown from Windham County in 1881.

== Geography ==
According to the U.S. Census Bureau, the county has a total area of 772 square miles (2,000 km^{2}), of which 665 square miles (1,720 km^{2}) is land and 107 square miles (280 km^{2}) (13.8%) is water.

The terrain of the county is mostly level, becoming more elevated only in its northern extreme. The highest point in the county is Gates Hill in the Town of Lebanon at approximately 660 feet (200 m) above sea level, and the lowest point is sea level.

=== Adjacent counties ===
- Windham County (north)
- Kent County, Rhode Island (northeast)
- Washington County, Rhode Island (east)
- Middlesex County (west)
- Tolland County (northwest)
- Hartford County (northwest)
- Suffolk County, New York (south)

== Government and municipal services ==
As of 1960, counties in Connecticut do not have any associated county government structure. All municipal services are provided by the towns. Regional councils of governments were established throughout the state in 1989 in order to address regional issues concerning infrastructure, land use, and economic development. Most of the towns of New London County are part of the Southeastern Connecticut Council of Governments, the exceptions being the towns of Lyme, Old Lyme, and Lebanon. Lyme and Old Lyme are part of the Connecticut River Estuary Regional Planning Agency, while Lebanon is part of the Windham Regional Council of Governments.

=== Judicial ===
The geographic area of the county is coterminous with the New London judicial district, with the superior courts located in the cities of New London and Norwich.

=== Law enforcement ===
Law enforcement within the geographic area of the county is provided by the respective town police departments. Prior to 2000, a County Sheriff's Department existed for the purpose of executing judicial warrants, prisoner transport, and court security. These responsibilities have now been taken over by the Connecticut State Marshal System.

=== Fire protection ===
Fire protection in the county is provided by the towns. Several towns also have fire districts that provide services to a section of the town.

=== Water service ===
Water service to 12 of the 21 towns of New London County is provided by a regional non-profit public corporation known as the Southeastern Water Authority. The Southeastern Water Authority supplies water to participating towns within New London County and is one of only two such county-wide public water service providers in the state. Seven towns receive water service from one or more private corporations. The city of Norwich and most of the town of Groton provide for their own water service.

=== Garbage disposal ===
Several towns in New London County have organized the Southeastern Connecticut Regional Resources Recovery Authority. The participating towns are East Lyme, Griswold, Groton, Ledyard, Montville, New London, North Stonington, Norwich, Preston, Sprague, Stonington, and Waterford.

=== Education ===
Education in the county area is usually provided by the individual town governments. The less populated towns of Lyme and Old Lyme have joined to form a single, regional school district (Region 18).

School districts include:

K-12:

- Colchester Public Schools
- East Lyme Public Schools
- Griswold School District
- Groton Public Schools
- Lebanon School District
- Ledyard School District
- Montville Public Schools
- New London School District
- North Stonington School District
- Norwich School District
- Regional School District 18
- Stonington School District
- Waterford School District

Elementary only:

- Bozrah School District
- Franklin School District
- Lisbon School District
- Preston School District
- Salem School District
- Sprague School District
- Voluntown School District

There is also a privately endowed publicly funded school, Norwich Free Academy.

=== Politics ===
Since 1952, New London County has voted for the presidential candidate that won Connecticut. In the last three presidential elections, Democratic strength was predominantly seen in the cities of New London and Norwich, as well as much of the county's southern and coastal areas. Conversely, Republican strength in the same elections was seen in the northern areas of the county.

United States presidential election results for New London County, Connecticut
Year	Republican		Democratic		Third party(ies)	
Year	No.	%	No.	%	No.	%
1884	7,405	50.80%	6,601	45.28%	572	3.92%
1888	7,726	48.56%	7,582	47.65%	603	3.79%
1892	7,716	47.20%	7,998	48.93%	633	3.87%
1896	10,081	61.34%	5,771	35.11%	583	3.55%
1900	9,582	57.39%	6,824	40.87%	290	1.74%
1904	10,385	58.23%	7,093	39.77%	357	2.00%
1908	9,941	58.70%	6,549	38.67%	446	2.63%
1912	5,543	35.13%	6,942	44.00%	3,292	20.87%
1916	8,283	48.51%	8,322	48.74%	469	2.75%
1920	17,422	63.31%	9,209	33.46%	889	3.23%
1924	18,205	62.34%	8,615	29.50%	2,381	8.15%
1928	21,378	56.30%	16,299	42.93%	292	0.77%
1932	19,721	49.11%	19,576	48.75%	858	2.14%
1936	21,367	44.79%	24,999	52.41%	1,337	2.80%
1940	23,389	45.18%	28,286	54.63%	98	0.19%
1944	24,153	44.94%	29,304	54.53%	285	0.53%
1948	27,416	47.42%	29,425	50.90%	973	1.68%
1952	38,148	54.76%	31,374	45.03%	148	0.21%
1956	43,453	61.40%	27,317	38.60%	0	0.00%
1960	38,070	48.38%	40,625	51.62%	1	0.00%
1964	24,391	30.88%	54,551	69.06%	49	0.06%
1968	37,116	44.41%	41,507	49.66%	4,951	5.92%
1972	58,516	63.40%	32,935	35.68%	850	0.92%
1976	47,231	50.40%	45,908	48.98%	581	0.62%
1980	47,217	47.96%	36,628	37.21%	14,603	14.83%
1984	63,121	61.59%	38,857	37.91%	509	0.50%
1988	52,681	51.22%	48,882	47.53%	1,288	1.25%
1992	34,567	29.35%	49,808	42.29%	33,392	28.35%
1996	33,039	32.05%	54,377	52.74%	15,679	15.21%
2000	41,168	37.72%	60,449	55.38%	7,530	6.90%
2004	49,931	42.19%	66,062	55.81%	2,367	2.00%
2008	48,491	38.83%	74,776	59.88%	1,607	1.29%
2012	46,119	40.07%	67,144	58.33%	1,839	1.60%
2016	54,058	43.76%	62,278	50.42%	7,192	5.82%
2020	57,110	40.91%	79,459	56.92%	3,035	2.17%
2024	58,858	42.81%	76,190	55.41%	2,452	1.78%

United States Senate election results for New London County, Connecticut1
Year	Republican		Democratic		Third party(ies)	
Year	No.	%	No.	%	No.	%
2012	46,056	42.13%	60,595	55.43%	2,667	2.44%
2018	40,993	39.12%	62,115	59.28%	1,679	1.60%
2024	52,861	39.76%	77,429	58.24%	2,655	2.00%

United States Senate election results for New London County, Connecticut2
Year	Republican		Democratic		Third party(ies)	
Year	No.	%	No.	%	No.	%
2010	34,810	40.51%	49,286	57.36%	1,832	2.13%
2016	40,238	33.86%	75,188	63.27%	3,414	2.87%
2022	42,835	43.03%	56,711	56.97%	6	0.01%

Connecticut Gubernatorial election results for New London County
Year	Republican		Democratic		Third party(ies)	
Year	No.	%	No.	%	No.	%
2010	42,090	49.08%	41,765	48.70%	1,911	2.23%
2014	39,666	47.34%	42,983	51.30%	1,132	1.35%
2018	49,364	46.39%	50,417	47.38%	6,625	6.23%
2022	43,902	43.71%	55,174	54.94%	1,353	1.35%

== Demographics ==
Historical population
Census	Pop.	Note	%±
1790	32,918		—
1800	34,888		6.0%
1810	34,707		−0.5%
1820	35,943		3.6%
1830	42,201		17.4%
1840	44,463		5.4%
1850	51,821		16.5%
1860	61,731		19.1%
1870	66,570		7.8%
1880	73,152		9.9%
1890	76,634		4.8%
1900	82,758		8.0%
1910	91,253		10.3%
1920	104,611		14.6%
1930	118,966		13.7%
1940	125,224		5.3%
1950	144,821		15.6%
1960	185,745		28.3%
1970	230,654		24.2%
1980	238,409		3.4%
1990	254,957		6.9%
2000	259,088		1.6%
2010	274,055		5.8%
2020	268,555		−2.0%
U.S. Decennial Census; 1790-1960 1900-1990; 1990-2000 2010-2018

=== 2020 census ===
As of the 2020 census, the county had a population of 268,555. Of the residents, 19.2% were under the age of 18 and 19.2% were 65 years of age or older; the median age was 42.3 years. For every 100 females there were 97.6 males, and for every 100 females age 18 and over there were 96.2 males. 70.3% of residents lived in urban areas and 29.7% lived in rural areas.

The racial makeup of the county was 75.0% White, 6.0% Black or African American, 0.9% American Indian and Alaska Native, 4.0% Asian, 0.1% Native Hawaiian and Pacific Islander, 4.9% from some other race, and 9.0% from two or more races. Hispanic or Latino residents of any race comprised 11.5% of the population.

There were 109,572 households in the county, of which 26.8% had children under the age of 18 living with them and 27.1% had a female householder with no spouse or partner present. About 29.8% of all households were made up of individuals and 12.6% had someone living alone who was 65 years of age or older.

There were 122,863 housing units, of which 10.8% were vacant. Among occupied housing units, 65.8% were owner-occupied and 34.2% were renter-occupied. The homeowner vacancy rate was 1.5% and the rental vacancy rate was 7.5%.

=== Racial and ethnic composition ===
New London County, Connecticut – Racial and ethnic composition Note: the US Census treats Hispanic/Latino as an ethnic category. This table excludes Latinos from the racial categories and assigns them to a separate category. Hispanics/Latinos may be of any race.
Race / Ethnicity (NH = Non-Hispanic)	Pop 1980	Pop 1990	Pop 2000	Pop 2010	Pop 2020	% 1980	% 1990	% 2000	% 2010	% 2020
White alone (NH)	221,547	230,179	219,542	214,605	194,894	92.93%	90.28%	84.74%	78.31%	72.57%
Black or African American alone (NH)	8,721	11,587	12,760	14,488	14,422	3.66%	4.54%	4.92%	5.29%	5.37%
Native American or Alaska Native alone (NH)	800	1,257	2,311	2,077	1,977	0.34%	0.49%	0.89%	0.76%	0.74%
Asian alone (NH)	2,134	3,145	5,026	11,248	10,633	0.90%	1.23%	1.94%	4.10%	3.96%
Native Hawaiian or Pacific Islander alone (NH)	x	x	135	159	215	x	x	0.05%	0.06%	0.08%
Other race alone (NH)	539	334	550	586	1,415	0.23%	0.13%	0.21%	0.21%	0.53%
Mixed race or Multiracial (NH)	x	x	5,528	7,678	14,079	x	x	2.13%	2.80%	5.24%
Hispanic or Latino (any race)	4,668	8,455	13,236	23,214	30,920	1.96%	3.32%	5.11%	8.47%	11.51%
Total	238,409	254,957	259,088	274,055	268,555	100.00%	100.00%	100.00%	100.00%	100.00%

=== 2010 census ===
As of the 2010 United States census, there were 274,055 people, 107,057 households, and 69,862 families residing in the county. The population density was 412.2 inhabitants per square mile (159.2/km^{2}). There were 120,994 housing units at an average density of 182.0 per square mile (70.3/km^{2}). The racial makeup of the county was 82.2% white, 5.8% black or African American, 4.2% Asian, 0.9% American Indian, 0.1% Pacific islander, 3.2% from other races, and 3.7% from two or more races. Those of Hispanic or Latino origin made up 8.5% of the population. In terms of ancestry, 18.9% were Irish, 15.2% were Italian, 14.8% were English, 11.6% were German, 9.6% were Polish, and 3.7% were American.

Of the 107,057 households, 31.3% had children under the age of 18 living with them, 48.7% were married couples living together, 11.8% had a female householder with no husband present, 34.7% were non-families, and 27.6% of all households were made up of individuals. The average household size was 2.44 and the average family size was 2.98. The median age was 40.4 years.

The median income for a household in the county was $65,419 and the median income for a family was $80,425. Males had a median income of $54,352 versus $41,721 for females. The per capita income for the county was $32,888. About 5.0% of families and 7.2% of the population were below the poverty line, including 9.7% of those under age 18 and 5.6% of those age 65 or over.

=== 2000 census ===
As of the census of 2000, there were 259,088 people, 99,835 households, and 67,188 families residing in the county. The population density was 389 people per square mile (150 people/km^{2}). There were 110,674 housing units at an average density of 166 per square mile (64/km^{2}). The racial makeup of the county was 87.00% White, 5.29% Black or African American, 0.96% Native American, 1.96% Asian, 0.06% Pacific Islander, 2.05% from other races, and 2.68% from two or more races. 5.11% of the population were Hispanic or Latino of any race. 13.8% were of Irish, 12.7% Italian, 10.8% English, 7.9% German, 7.1% Polish and 6.4% French ancestry, 90.1% spoke English, 4.5% Spanish and 1.1% French as their first language.

There were 99,835 households, out of which 32.40% had children under the age of 18 living with them, 52.50% were married couples living together, 11.00% had a female householder with no husband present, and 32.70% were non-families. 26.40% of all households were made up of individuals, and 9.50% had someone living alone who was 65 years of age or older. The average household size was 2.48 and the average family size was 3.00.

In the county, the population was spread out, with 24.40% under the age of 18, 8.60% from 18 to 24, 31.20% from 25 to 44, 22.80% from 45 to 64, and 13.00% who were 65 years of age or older. The median age was 37 years. For every 100 females there were 97.90 males. For every 100 females age 18 and over, there were 96.50 males.

The median income for a household in the county was $50,646, and the median income for a family was $59,857. Males had a median income of $41,292 versus $30,525 for females. The per capita income for the county was $24,678. About 4.50% of families and 6.40% of the population were below the poverty line, including 7.80% of those under age 18 and 6.60% of those age 65 or over.

=== Demographic breakdown by town ===
==== Income ====
Data is from the 2010 United States Census and the 2006-2010 American Community Survey 5-Year Estimates.

Rank	Town		Per capita income	Median household income	Median family income	Population	Number of households
1	Lyme	Town	$64,506	$88,500	$98,500	2,406	1,033
2	Stonington	Borough	$64,224	$74,583	$96,667	929	531
3	Old Lyme	Town	$52,037	$92,024	$107,174	7,603	3,172
4	Stonington	Town	$42,184	$72,445	$86,029	18,545	8,115
5	Salem	Town	$41,414	$95,000	$106,875	4,151	1,525
6	North Stonington	Town	$39,588	$88,869	$96,125	5,297	2,052
7	Bozrah	Town	$38,339	$75,000	$99,625	2,627	1,007
8	Waterford	Town	$37,690	$69,810	$91,893	19,517	8,005
9	Ledyard	Town	$37,663	$85,321	$97,152	15,051	5,634
10	East Lyme	Town	$37,019	$79,815	$102,864	19,159	7,192
11	Colchester	Town	$35,479	$92,431	$101,860	16,068	5,915
12	Lebanon	Town	$34,608	$72,431	$80,566	7,308	2,644
13	Lisbon	Town	$33,685	$77,872	$86,469	4,338	1,659
14	Preston	Town	$32,956	$77,377	$86,435	4,726	1,869
15	Voluntown	Town	$32,760	$73,980	$76,197	2,603	1,002
16	Franklin	Town	$31,518	$74,226	$87,237	1,922	729
17	Sprague	Town	$31,226	$68,241	$78,438	2,984	1,135
18	Groton	Town	$31,110	$56,904	$67,465	40,115	15,809
19	Griswold	Town	$29,421	$59,295	$75,870	11,951	4,646
20	Groton	City	$28,872	$49,464	$52,366	10,389	4,182
21	Montville	Town	$28,492	$65,349	$80,156	19,571	6,942
22	Norwich	City	$26,702	$52,186	$62,616	40,493	16,599
23	Jewett City	Borough	$23,876	$39,334	$55,781	3,487	1,466
24	New London	City	$21,110	$43,551	$49,811	27,620	10,373

==== Race ====
Data is from the 2007-2011 American Community Survey 5-Year Estimates, ACS Demographic and Housing Estimates, "Race alone or in combination with one or more other races."

Rank	Town		Population	White	Black	Asian	American Indian	Other	Hispanic
1	Groton	Town	40,190	83.9%	9.1%	6.1%	2.4%	4.8%	9.4%
2	Norwich	City	40,085	79.4%	14.5%	8.3%	2.2%	5.6%	10.0%
3	New London	City	27,550	64.5%	20.4%	5.0%	2.5%	13.5%	27.7%
4	Montville	Town	19,505	82.8%	6.2%	7.1%	4.0%	3.8%	6.8%
5	Waterford	Town	19,451	92.9%	3.7%	3.5%	0.4%	1.7%	4.1%
6	East Lyme	Town	19,080	85.9%	5.8%	5.5%	1.1%	4.1%	6.7%
7	Stonington	Town	18,482	96.0%	2.2%	2.2%	0.7%	1.3%	2.7%
8	Colchester	Town	15,929	97.3%	3.3%	0.6%	0.8%	0.3%	3.8%
9	Ledyard	Town	15,016	91.7%	2.3%	5.2%	4.4%	0.9%	4.0%
10	Griswold	Town	11,837	94.6%	2.3%	3.3%	0.7%	0.9%	5.2%
11	Groton	City	10,305	78.8%	14.9%	6.3%	2.5%	5.2%	11.0%
12	Old Lyme	Town	7,583	99.1%	0.5%	0.8%	1.5%	0.3%	1.5%
13	Lebanon	Town	7,268	98.5%	1.1%	2.3%	2.1%	0.6%	3.9%
14	North Stonington	Town	5,272	96.6%	1.9%	1.1%	0.9%	0.5%	3.5%
15	Preston	Town	4,729	89.8%	1.6%	8.5%	3.3%	1.0%	2.5%
16	Lisbon	Town	4,322	96.8%	2.3%	1.9%	3.6%	0.0%	0.2%
17	Salem	Town	4,118	94.3%	1.0%	6.7%	1.8%	0.5%	4.8%
18	Jewett City	Borough	3,445	86.8%	6.6%	8.4%	0.5%	1.2%	8.2%
19	Sprague	Town	2,983	90.5%	0.6%	6.1%	0.0%	2.7%	2.7%
20	Bozrah	Town	2,603	94.7%	2.9%	1.6%	1.5%	1.0%	2.7%
21	Voluntown	Town	2,603	98.4%	2.6%	1.2%	5.1%	0.2%	1.1%
22	Lyme	Town	2,327	97.6%	0.0%	0.3%	0.0%	2.8%	1.5%
23	Franklin	Town	1,958	98.8%	0.1%	0.2%	3.9%	0.2%	2.1%
24	Stonington	Borough	1,069	98.4%	0.8%	0.7%	0.0%	0.1%	3.2%

== Communities ==
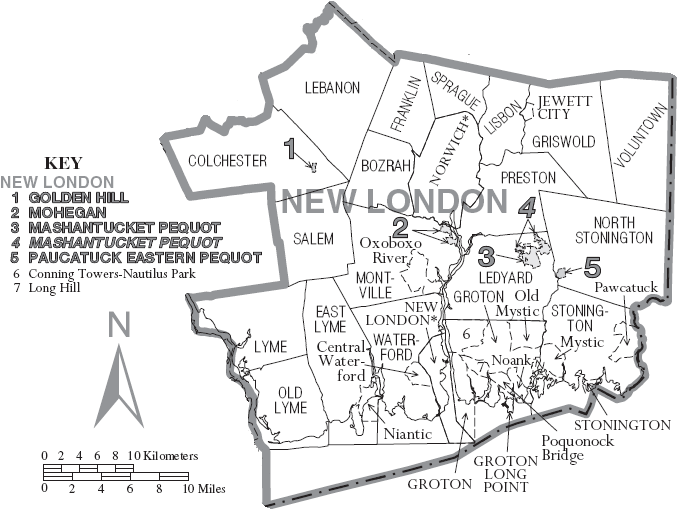
Map of New London County, Connecticut showing cities, boroughs, towns, CDPs, and Indian Reservations

=== Cities ===
- New London
- Norwich

=== Towns ===
Villages are named localities within towns, but have no separate corporate existence from the towns they are in.

- Bozrah
- Colchester
  - Colchester village
  - Westchester
- East Lyme
  - Flanders
  - Niantic
- Franklin
- Griswold
  - Borough of Jewett City
  - Hopeville
  - Glasgo
  - Pachaug
- Groton
  - Burnett's Corner
  - Conning Towers-Nautilus Park
  - City of Groton
  - Groton Long Point
  - Long Hill
  - Mystic
  - Noank
  - Old Mystic
  - Poquonock Bridge
- Lebanon
- Ledyard
  - Gales Ferry
  - Ledyard Center
  - Mashantucket
- Lisbon
- Lyme
- Montville
  - Chesterfield
  - Mohegan
  - Oakdale
  - Oxoboxo River
  - Uncasville
- North Stonington
- Old Lyme
- Preston
  - Poquetanuck
  - Preston City
- Salem
- Sprague
  - Baltic
  - Hanover
- Stonington
  - Lords Point
  - Mystic
  - Pawcatuck
- Voluntown
- Waterford
  - Graniteville
  - Jordan Village
  - Oswegatchie
  - Quaker Hill
  - Waterford village

== See also ==
- National Register of Historic Places listings in New London County, Connecticut
