= Burnett's Corner, Connecticut =

- Burnett's Corner Historic District
- U.S. National Register of Historic Places
- U.S. Historic district
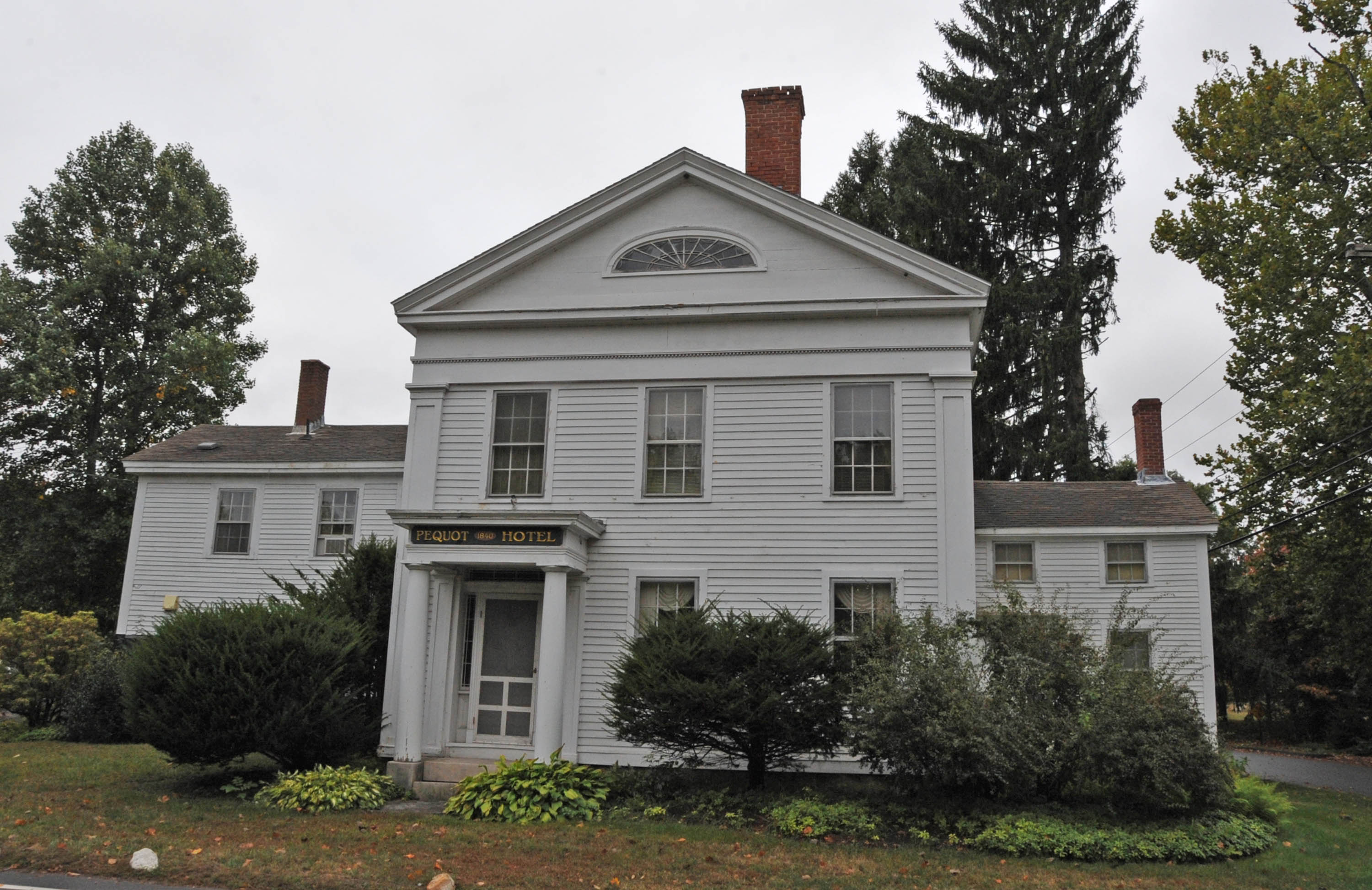

- Location within Connecticut Location within the United States
- Location: Along Packer Road, South of CT 184, Groton, Connecticut
- Coordinates: 41°23′17″N 71°58′45″W
- Area: 45 acres (18 ha)
- Architectural style: Colonial, Greek Revival
- NRHP reference No.: 97001468
- Added to NRHP: December 4, 1997

Burnetts Corner is a village in the town of Groton, Connecticut, and the site of Burnett's Corner Historic District, listed on the National Register of Historic Places.

== History ==
Burnett's Corner grew in the 18th and 19th centuries as a crossroads village and stagecoach stop on the Boston Post Road that connects New York City and Boston. It takes its name from Richard Burnett (1801–1890), a former sea captain who operated the Pequot Hotel as an overnight stop on the Post Road. Burnett's Corner was bypassed by the railroad that was built through the area in 1858 and that largely replaced stagecoach travel.

Early in the 20th century, Burnett's Corner was the site of small-scale manufacturing operations, including a witch hazel mill built by T. N. Dickinson Jr. around 1907 and a ropewalk operated by a twine manufacturer. The Gold Star Highway was built through the area in the 1930s, and Burnett's Corner took on the function of a suburban community, housing people who commute to work by automobile.

=== Historic district ===
Burnett's Corner Historic District was listed on the National Register of Historic Places in 1997. It includes 30 contributing buildings and three contributing sites over a 45-acre (18 ha) linear area along the Old Post Road (now Packer Road). Buildings in the district include representative examples of vernacular domestic architecture of the 18th, 19th, and 20th centuries, including Colonial and Greek Revival styles. The Greek Revival-style Pequot Hotel built around 1842 is prominently located in the center of the district, but is currently closed.

== See also ==
- National Register of Historic Places listings in New London County, Connecticut
