= Groton (city), Connecticut =

City in Connecticut, United States

City of Groton, Connecticut
- City
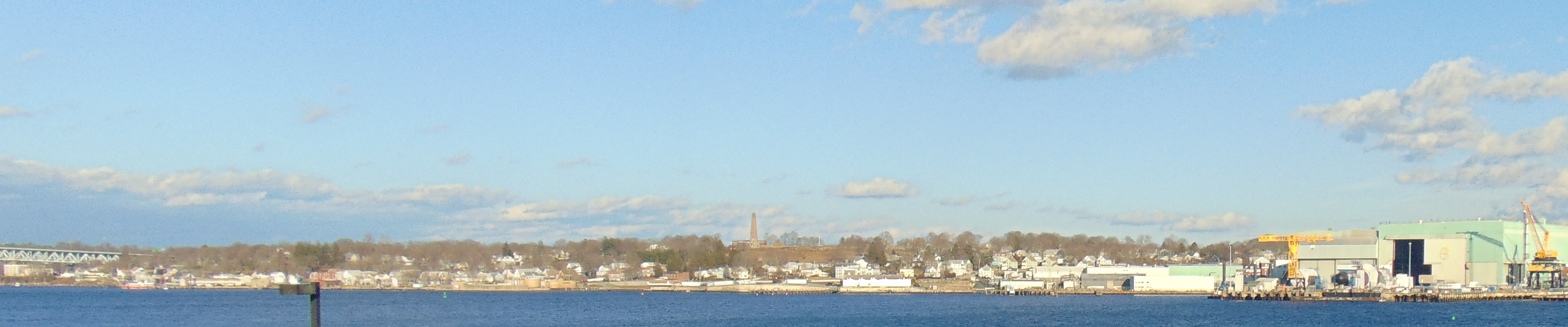
- Skyline of Groton

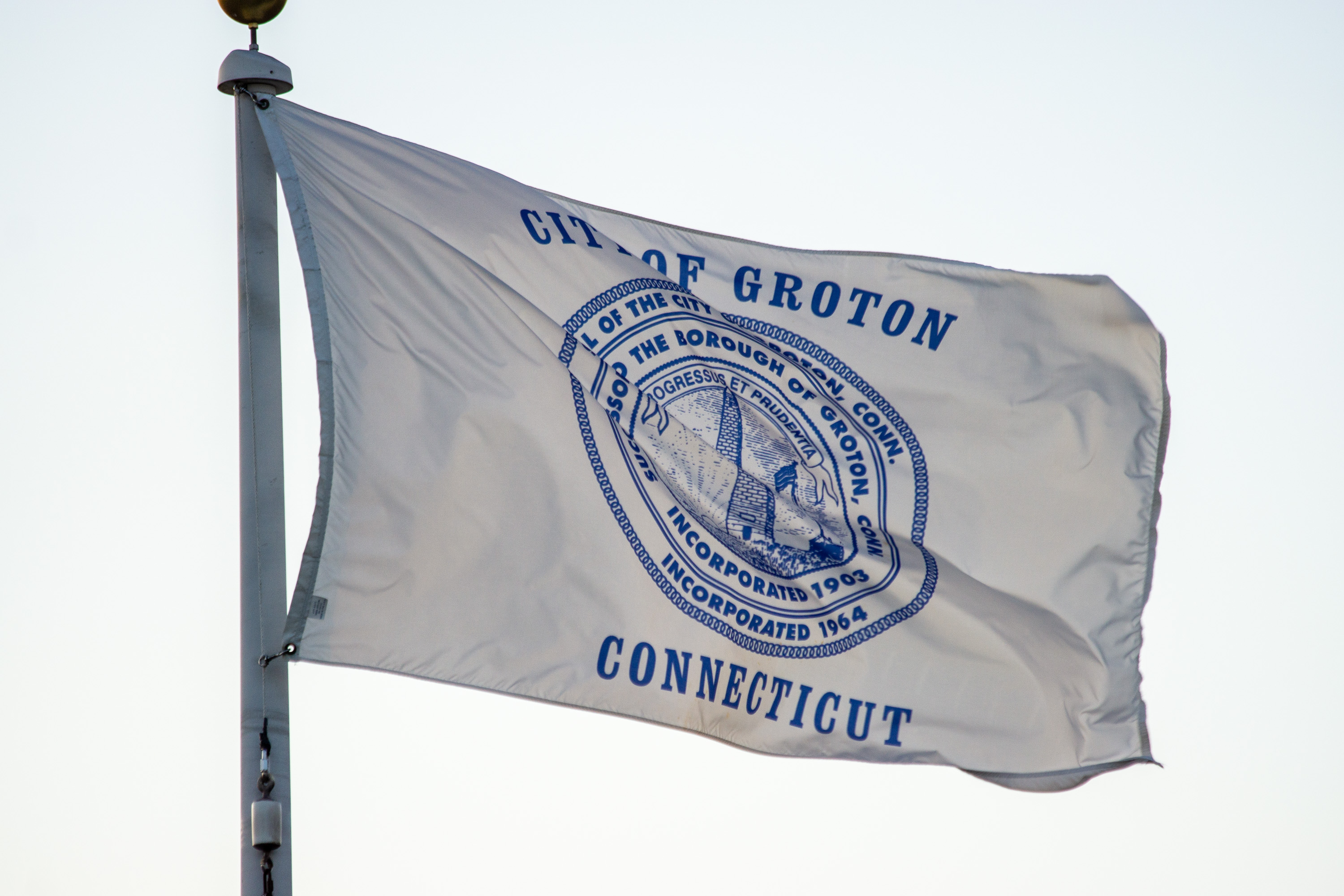
- Flag Seal
- Interactive map of City of Groton, Connecticut
- Coordinates: 41°20′45″N 72°01′47″W
- Country: United States
- U.S. state: Connecticut
- County: New London
- Region: Southeastern CT
- Incorporated: 1964

Government
  - Mayor: Jill Rusk (D)
  - City Councilors: Paul Norris (D) Christine Piazza (D) Nicholas Johns (D) Jean-Claude Ambroise (D) Beverly Washington (D)

Area
  - Total: 6.8 sq mi (17.5 km^{2})
  - Land: 3.1 sq mi (8.0 km^{2})
  - Water: 3.7 sq mi (9.5 km^{2})

Population (2010)
  - Total: 10,389
  - Estimate (2019): 8,911
  - Density: 3,400/sq mi (1,300/km^{2})
- Time zone: UTC-5 (Eastern)
  - Summer (DST): UTC-4 (Eastern)
- ZIP Code: 06340
- Area code: 860/959
- FIPS code: 09-34180
- GNIS feature ID: 0207531
- Airport: Groton–New London Airport
- Website: cityofgroton.com

The City of Groton is a dependent political subdivision of the town of Groton, Connecticut, United States. The city was settled in 1655 as Groton Bank, and the area developed into the principal village of the town of Groton. The village of Groton incorporated as a borough in 1903, and the residents of the borough of Groton reincorporated as the city of Groton in 1964. It is the only remaining city in the state of Connecticut that is not governmentally consolidated with its parent town. The city is part of the Southeastern Connecticut Planning Region. The population was 10,389 at the 2010 census.

== Geography ==
According to the United States Census Bureau, the city has a total area of 6.8 square miles (17.5 km^{2}), of which 3.1 square miles (8.0 km^{2}) is land and 3.7 square miles (9.5 km^{2}), or 54.39%, is water.

== Demographics ==
As of the census of 2000, there were 10,010 people, 4,230 households, and 2,444 families living in the city. The population density was 3,138.0 inhabitants per square mile (1,211.6/km^{2}). There were 4,569 housing units at an average density of 1,432.3 per square mile (553.0/km^{2}). The racial makeup of the city was 77.72% White, 10.18% Black or African American, 0.93% American Indian, 3.55% Asian, 0.05% Pacific Islander, 2.84% from other races, and 4.74% from two or more races. Hispanic or Latino of any race were 7.72% of the population.

There were 4,230 households, 30.2% had children under the age of 18 living with them, 35.2% were married couples living together, 17.8% had a female householder with no husband present, and 42.2% were non-families. 33.6% of households were made up of individuals, and 8.3% were one person aged 65 or older. The average household size was 2.19, and the average family size was 2.77.

The age distribution was 22.5% under the age of 18, 15.7% from 18 to 24, 32.9% from 25 to 44, 18.3% from 45 to 64, and 10.5% 65 or older. The median age was 32 years. For every 100 females, there were 111.0 males. For every 100 females age 18 and over, there were 113.6 males.

The median household income was $40,515 and the median family income was $43,859. Males had a median income of $32,476 versus $28,510 for females. The per capita income for the city was $22,239. About 10.3% of families and 9.9% of the population were below the poverty line, including 16.9% of those under age 18 and 5.8% of those age 65 or over.

== Notable people ==
- Husband Edward Kimmel (1882–1968) was a four-star admiral in the United States Navy. He served as Commander in Chief, U.S. Pacific Fleet during the Japanese attack on Pearl Harbor.
- Morton F. Plant, industrialist who built Branford House on Avery Point, now part of the University of Connecticut, and a founder and early benefactor of Connecticut College
