= Groton and Stonington Street Railway =

Interurban railway in Connecticut and Rhode Island

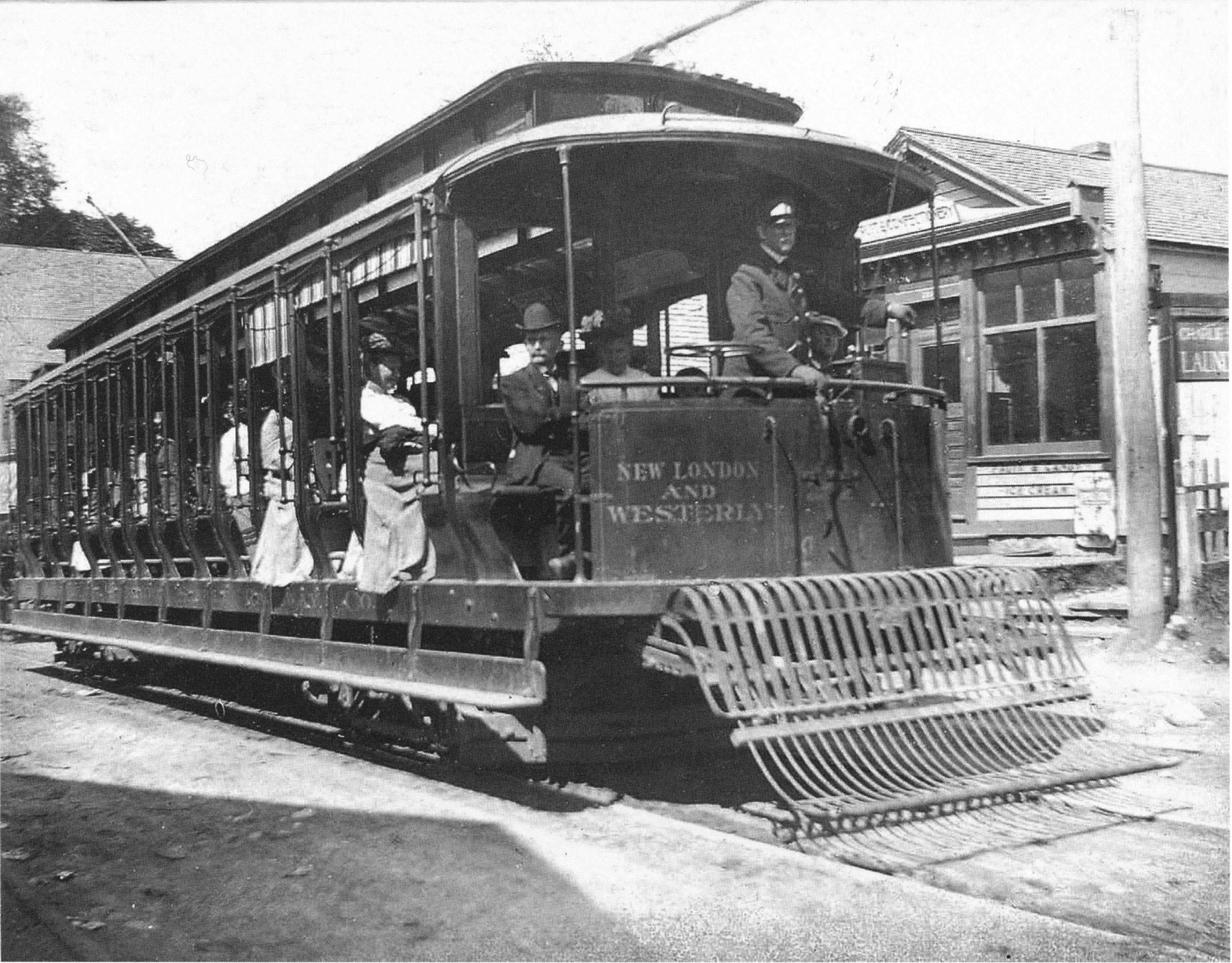
- A Groton & Stonington car in Groton around 1915
- Industry: Public transportation
- Founded: December 9, 1904
- Defunct: July 29, 1928
- Fate: Defunct
- Headquarters: Groton, Connecticut

The Groton and Stonington Street Railway was an interurban trolley line that extended from Groton, Connecticut, to Westerly, Rhode Island, with a later branch to Old Mystic, Connecticut, and an extension to New London. The line operated from 1904 to 1919 and 1923 to 1928, after which it was replaced by buses.

== History ==
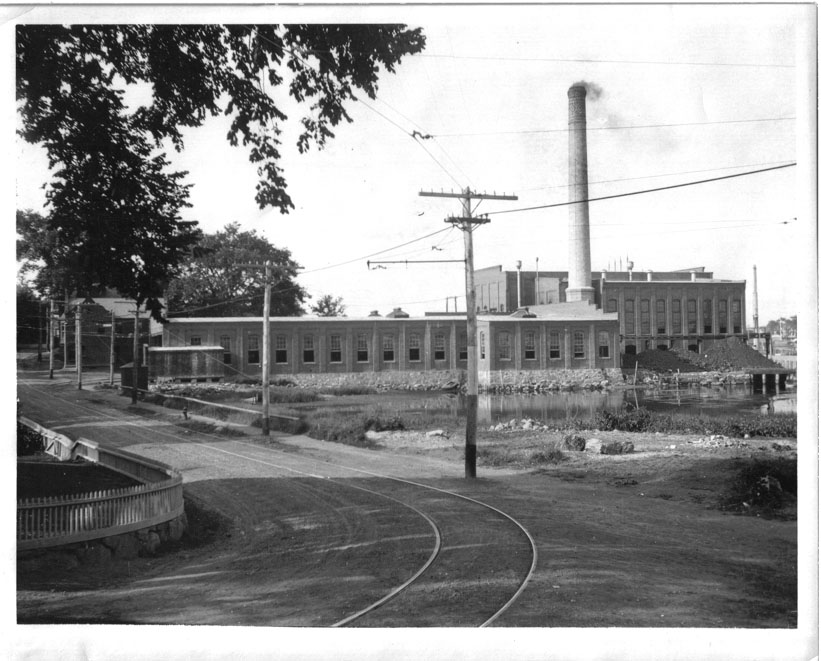
Carhouse (left) and powerhouse in 1905

The Groton and Stonington Street Railway was chartered on August 17, 1903, with permission to build two lines. The loop line in Groton was never constructed, but work began on the line from Groton to Stonington in early 1904. The G&S opened from Groton to Mystic on December 19, 1904, to Stonington on April 8, 1905, and finally to the state line at Westerly on May 6, 1905.

The trolley line started at Thames Street in Groton, passing through Poquonnock and Noank, and ending in Mystic. The company was headquartered in Mystic, and the powerhouse was located in between Water Street and the west bank of the Mystic River. The powerhouse is still standing, and has been converted into condominiums. The adjacent carhouse was retrofitted with two additional stories in the 1980s and converted into condominiums as well.

A spur line was built in 1911 that extended to Old Mystic. In 1928, G&S ceased operating, and buses of the Groton-Stonington Traction Company began operating along the route.

== Rolling stock ==
- Eight open cars
- Eight closed cars
- One double-truck Taunton snowplow
- One work car
