= Oswegatchie Historic District =

Historic district in Connecticut, United States

- U.S. National Register of Historic Places
- U.S. Historic district
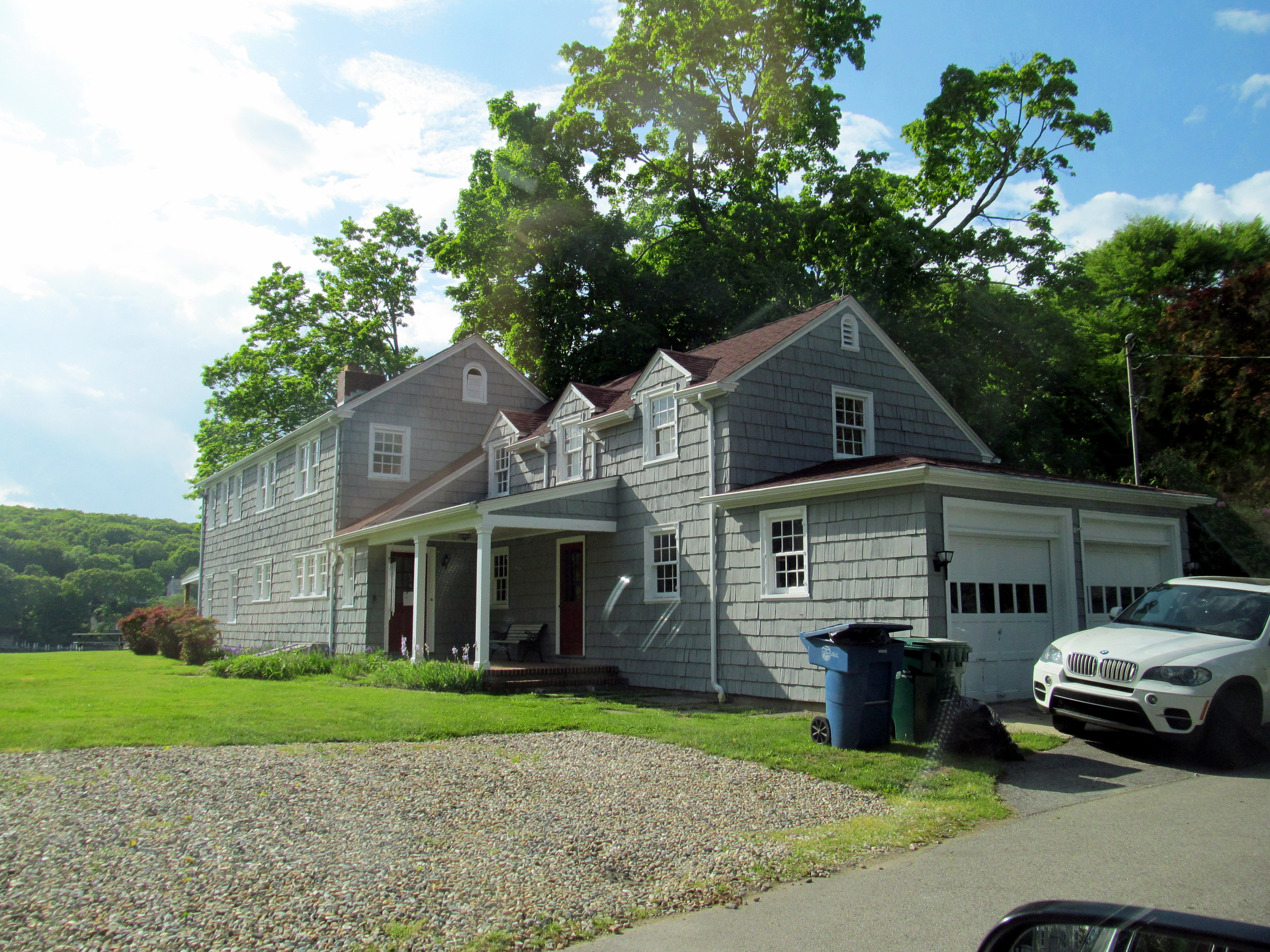
- A house on Park Drive in Oswegatchie

- Location within Connecticut Location within the United States
- Location: East Street, Riverside, Plant, Park Drives, and Shawandassee and Oswegatchie Roads, Waterford, Connecticut
- Coordinates: 41°21′7″N 72°11′5″W
- Area: 63 acres (25 ha)
- Architectural style: Colonial Revival, Classical Revival, et al.
- NRHP reference No.: 05001043
- Added to NRHP: September 15, 2005

The Oswegatchie Historic District is a historic district in the town of Waterford, Connecticut, United States. The historic district is located on a peninsula on the east side of the tidal Niantic River, and represents a cross-section of historic coastal land uses, from farming to a small colony of summer estates to year-round living. The district was listed on the National Register of Historic Places in 2005.

== Description and history ==
The Oswegatchie area was first settled by English colonists as farmland, beginning in the late 17th century. In the mid-19th century John Manwaring, a local farmer, took on workers in nearby granite quarries as boarders. Manwaring continued to take summer boarders after the quarries closed in the 1870s, with his son expanding the business around the turn of the 20th century, building a hotel called the Oswegatchie House. The area received a boost when the New London and East Lyme Street Railway was run down Oswegatchie Street from New London, and several handsome summer estates were built on the best land at the southern end of the peninsula. Trolley service ended in the 1920s, and the Great Depression led to the downfall of the Oswegatchie House, which finally burned in 1935. After World War II, demand for housing prompted development in the northern part of the peninsula with year-round housing.

The historic district is essentially U-shaped, hugging the shoreline along the eastern bank of the Niantic River and the west and north sides of Keeny Cove. Its northwestern boundary is at East Drive, from which it runs south, around Sandy Point, and along Oswegatchie Road nearly to the head of Keeny Cove. Most of the district's buildings are residential structures, built either between 1900 and 1920, or in the 1940s and 1950s, representing the two major periods of development. The only non-residential building in the district is the Oswegatchie Church, built in 1929 to serve the summer residents.

== See also ==
- National Register of Historic Places listings in New London County, Connecticut
