= Poquonock Bridge, Connecticut =

Census-designated place in Connecticut, United States

- Census-designated place
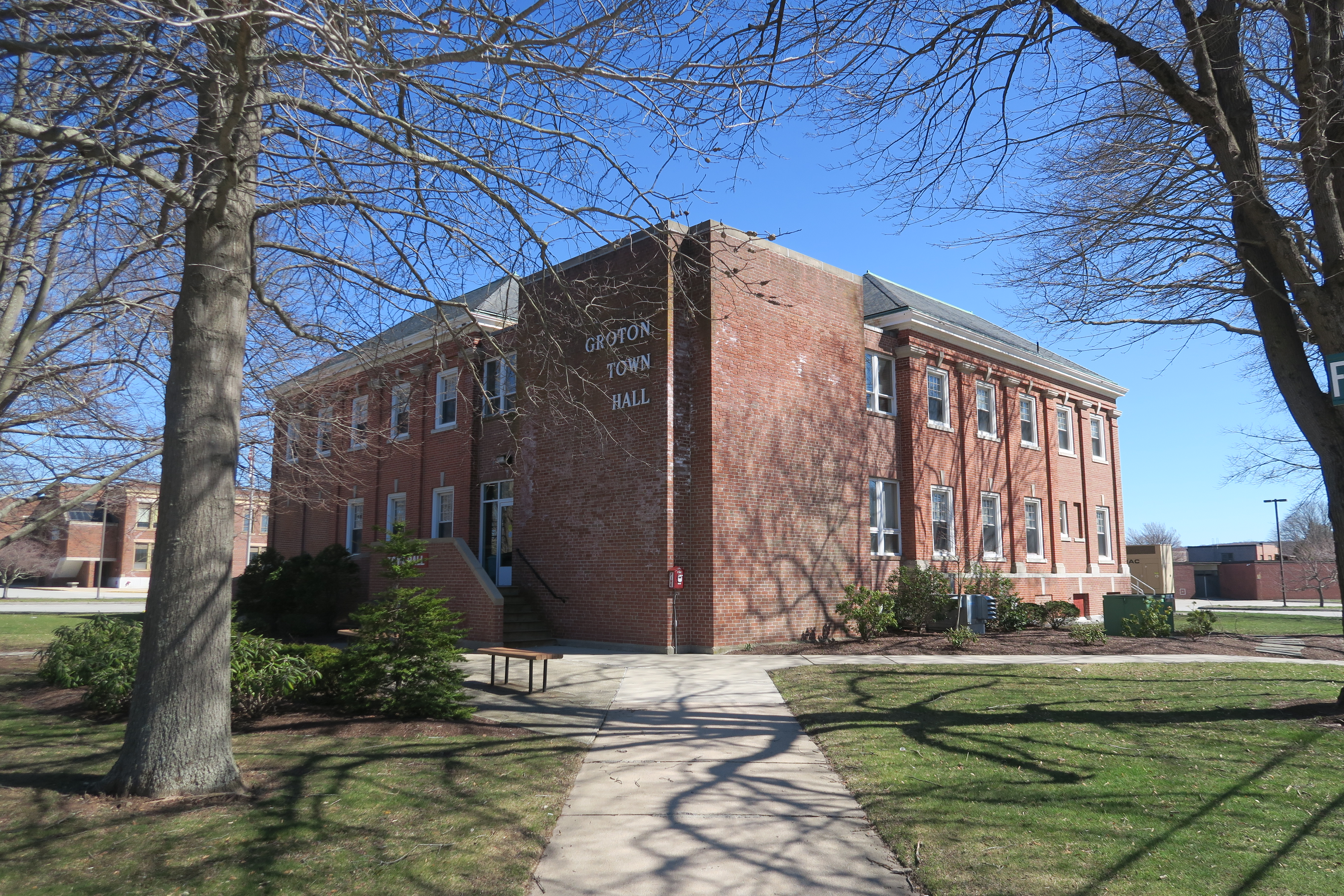
- Groton Town Hall

- Location in New London County, Connecticut
- Coordinates: 41°20′42″N 72°01′29″W
- Country: United States
- State: Connecticut
- County: New London
- Town: Groton

Area
  - Total: 1.4 sq mi (3.7 km^{2})
  - Land: 1.4 sq mi (3.5 km^{2})
  - Water: 0.077 sq mi (0.2 km^{2})
- Elevation: 98 ft (30 m)

Population (2010)
  - Total: 1,727
  - Density: 1,300/sq mi (490/km^{2})
- Time zone: UTC−5 (Eastern (EST))
  - Summer (DST): UTC−4 (EDT)
- ZIP Code: 06340
- Area code: 860
- FIPS code: 09-61730
- GNIS feature ID: 2377852

Poquonock Bridge is a census-designated place (CDP) and village in the town of Groton in New London County, Connecticut, United States. The population was 1,686 at the 2020 census.

The village is located just east of the head of the Poquonnock River near the intersection of U.S. Route 1 and Connecticut Route 117. The village was first settled in 1652–53 by James Morgan, James Avery, and Nehemiah Smith. The Groton Town Hall is located in the village.

== Geography ==
According to the United States Census Bureau, the CDP has a total area of 1.4 square miles (3.7 km^{2}), of which 1.4 square miles (3.5 km^{2}) is land, and 0.077 square miles (0.2 km^{2}) (5.07%) is water.

== Demographics ==
=== 2020 census ===
As of the 2020 census, Poquonock Bridge had a population of 1,686. The median age was 36.1 years. 23.8% of residents were under the age of 18 and 12.7% of residents were 65 years of age or older. For every 100 females there were 99.3 males, and for every 100 females age 18 and over there were 95.6 males age 18 and over.

97.0% of residents lived in urban areas, while 3.0% lived in rural areas.

There were 642 households in Poquonock Bridge, of which 36.6% had children under the age of 18 living in them. Of all households, 35.2% were married-couple households, 20.1% were households with a male householder and no spouse or partner present, and 29.6% were households with a female householder and no spouse or partner present. About 24.6% of all households were made up of individuals and 7.7% had someone living alone who was 65 years of age or older.

There were 690 housing units, of which 7.0% were vacant. The homeowner vacancy rate was 1.5% and the rental vacancy rate was 5.4%.

Racial composition as of the 2020 census
Race	Number	Percent
White	771	45.7%
Black or African American	181	10.7%
American Indian and Alaska Native	40	2.4%
Asian	192	11.4%
Native Hawaiian and Other Pacific Islander	2	0.1%
Some other race	239	14.2%
Two or more races	261	15.5%
Hispanic or Latino (of any race)	399	23.7%

=== 2000 census ===
As of the 2000 census, there were 1,592 people, 588 households, and 415 families residing in the CDP. The population density was 1,165.8 inhabitants per square mile (450.1/km^{2}). There were 630 housing units at an average density of 461.3 per square mile (178.1/km^{2}). The racial makeup of the CDP was 65.45% White, 14.13% African American, 3.83% Native American, 8.04% Asian, 0.25% Pacific Islander, 1.76% from other races, and 6.53% from two or more races. Hispanic or Latino of any race were 6.16% of the population.

There were 588 households, out of which 38.9% had children under the age of 18 living with them, 41.8% were married couples living together, 22.4% had a female householder with no husband present, and 29.3% were non-families. Of all households, 23.5% were made up of individuals, and 7.7% had someone living alone who was 65 years of age or older. The average household was 2.71 persons, and the average family size was 3.14.

In the CDP, the population was spread out, with 29.8% under the age of 18, 9.2% from 18 to 24, 31.3% from 25 to 44, 19.3% from 45 to 64, and 10.4% who were 65 years of age or older. The median age was 33 years. For every 100 females, there were 95.8 males. For every 100 females age 18 and over, there were 91.4 males.

The median income for a household in the CDP was $33,652, and the median income for a family was $35,592. Males had a median income of $24,219 versus $21,250 for females. The per capita income for the CDP was $14,664. About 11.2% of families and 15.5% of the population were below the poverty line, including 23.5% of those under age 18, and 5.4% of those age 65 or over.

== Education ==
The census-designated place, along with the rest of Groton Town, is in the Groton School District.
