= Old Mystic, Connecticut =

Coordinates: 41°23′29″N 71°57′42″W

- Census-designated place
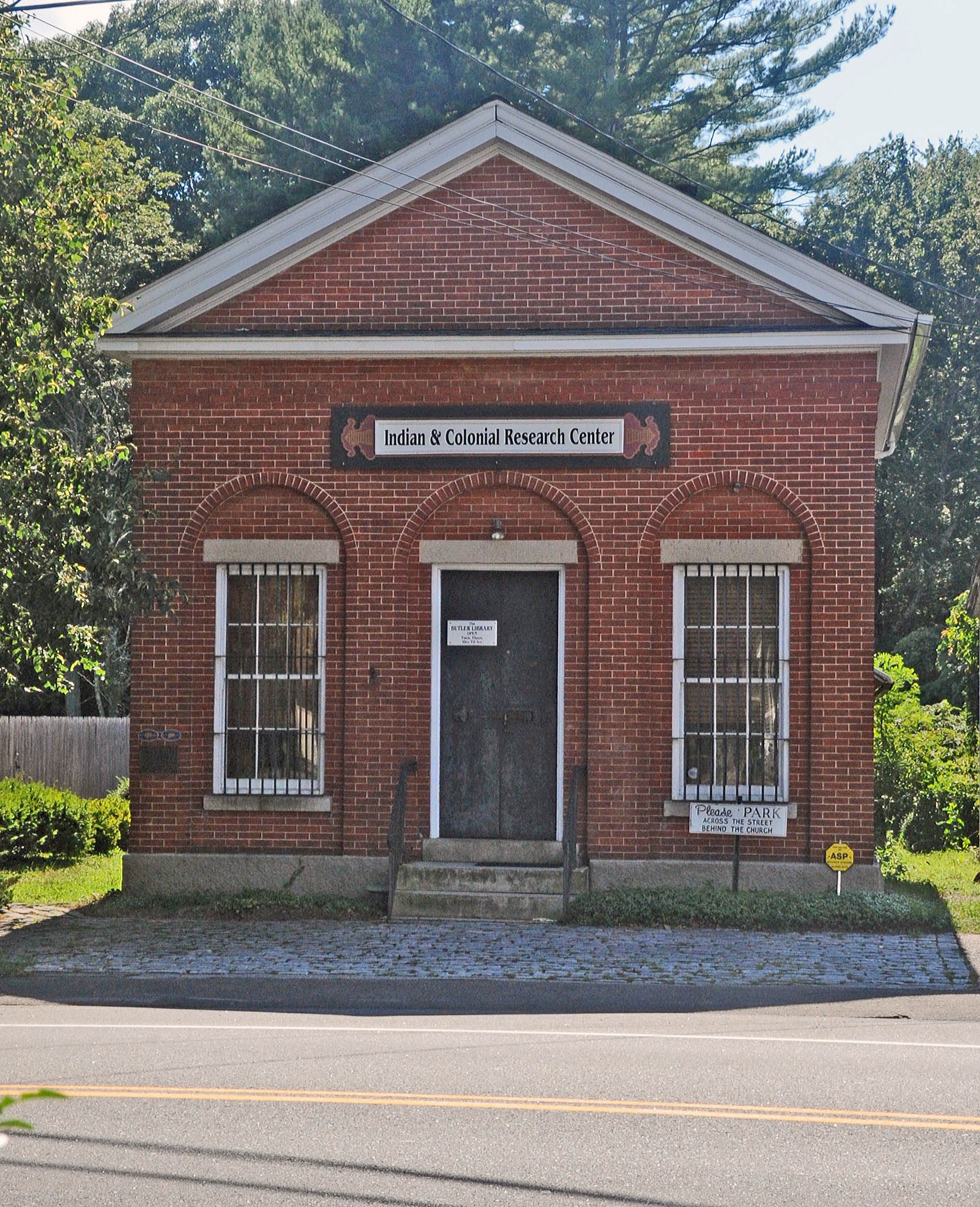
- Mystic Bank

- Country: United States
- State: Connecticut
- County: New London
- Town: Groton

Area
  - Total: 4.2 sq mi (11 km^{2})
  - Land: 4.2 sq mi (11 km^{2})
  - Water: 0.10 sq mi (0.26 km^{2})
- Elevation: 138 ft (42 m)

Population (2010)
  - Total: 3,554
  - Density: 840/sq mi (320/km^{2})
- Time zone: UTC−5 (Eastern (EST))
  - Summer (DST): UTC−4 (EDT)
- ZIP code: 06355
- Area code: 860
- FIPS code: 09-57180
- GNIS feature ID: 2377846

Old Mystic is a village and census-designated place (CDP) located in the towns of Groton and Stonington Connecticut. As of the 2020 census, Old Mystic had a population of 3,493.

== Geography ==
According to the United States Census Bureau, the CDP has a total area of 4.4 square miles (11 km^{2}), of which 4.3 square miles (11 km^{2}) is land and 0.1 square miles (0.26 km^{2}), or 2.29%, is water.

== Demographics ==
=== 2020 census ===
As of the 2020 census, Old Mystic had a population of 3,493. The median age was 44.3 years. 18.9% of residents were under the age of 18 and 19.7% of residents were 65 years of age or older. For every 100 females there were 100.7 males, and for every 100 females age 18 and over there were 99.0 males age 18 and over.

95.7% of residents lived in urban areas, while 4.3% lived in rural areas.

There were 1,441 households in Old Mystic, of which 25.6% had children under the age of 18 living in them. Of all households, 52.9% were married-couple households, 16.9% were households with a male householder and no spouse or partner present, and 22.5% were households with a female householder and no spouse or partner present. About 25.8% of all households were made up of individuals and 12.1% had someone living alone who was 65 years of age or older.

There were 1,501 housing units, of which 4.0% were vacant. The homeowner vacancy rate was 0.5% and the rental vacancy rate was 2.4%.

Racial composition as of the 2020 census
Race	Number	Percent
White	2,771	79.3%
Black or African American	119	3.4%
American Indian and Alaska Native	15	0.4%
Asian	240	6.9%
Native Hawaiian and Other Pacific Islander	5	0.1%
Some other race	59	1.7%
Two or more races	284	8.1%
Hispanic or Latino (of any race)	217	6.2%

=== 2000 census ===
As of the census of 2000, there were 3,205 people, 1,205 households, and 880 families residing in the CDP. The population density was 750.5 inhabitants per square mile (289.8/km^{2}). There were 1,249 housing units at an average density of 292.5 per square mile (112.9/km^{2}). The racial makeup of the CDP was 90.11% White, 2.43% African American, 0.66% American Indian, 3.43% Asian, 0.06% Pacific Islander, 0.50% from other races, and 2.81% from two or more races. Hispanic or Latino of any race were 1.62% of the population.

There were 1,205 households, out of which 34.6% had children under the age of 18 living with them, 60.0% were married couples living together, 9.4% had a female householder with no husband present, and 26.9% were non-families. 19.5% of all households were made up of individuals, and 5.1% had someone living alone who was 65 years of age or older. The average household size was 2.64 and the average family size was 3.06.

In the CDP, the population was spread out, with 25.7% under the age of 18, 5.5% from 18 to 24, 32.7% from 25 to 44, 25.3% from 45 to 64, and 10.7% who were 65 years of age or older. The median age was 38 years. For every 100 females, there were 96.1 males. For every 100 females age 18 and over, there were 97.2 males.

The median income for a household in the CDP was $63,036, and the median income for a family was $68,500. Males had a median income of $50,095 versus $31,536 for females. The per capita income for the CDP was $27,988. About 1.5% of families and 3.2% of the population were below the poverty line, including 1.6% of those under age 18 and 3.8% of those age 65 or over.

== Education ==
Old Mystic is in both the Groton and Stonington School Districts.
