= Pope's Flat =

Island in Stratford, Connecticut, United States

Pope's Flat (sometimes called Pope's Island) is the second largest of the four islands owned by Stratford, Connecticut in the Housatonic River between I-95 and the Merritt Parkway. The island is north of the Moses Wheeler Bridge, northeast of Carting Island, Long Island (Connecticut) and Peacock Island (Connecticut), and south of Fowler Island in Milford and the Igor I. Sikorsky Memorial Bridge. The island is uninhabited except for occasional visits by anglers, bird watchers and duck hunters.

== Physical description ==
41°13′10″N 73°6′37″W

- Elevation: ~3 feet (0.91 m)
- The mercury content was evaluated in 2003 at ~300 to 5000 ppb.

== Transportation ==
All transportation to and from the island is by boat.
