= Carting Island =

Island in Connecticut, United States

Carting Island is the largest of the four islands owned by Stratford, Connecticut, in the Housatonic River between I-95 and the Merritt Parkway. The island is north of the Moses Wheeler Bridge, east of Peacock Island (Connecticut), and southwest of Long Island (Connecticut), and Pope's Flat, it is also south of Fowler Island in Milford and the Igor I. Sikorsky Memorial Bridge. The island is uninhabited except for occasional visits by anglers, bird watchers and duck hunters. All transportation to and from the island is by boat.

From 2011, the island was part of a multi-year wetland restoration report by the U.S. Fish & Wildlife Service, NOAA, and the Connecticut Department of Energy and Environmental Protection. The project goal was to eradicate an invasive species of plant known as Phragmites.

== Geography ==
- 41°12′48″N 73°6′48″W
- Elevation: ~3 feet (0.91 m)
- The mercury content was evaluated in 2003 at ~300 to 5000 ppb.
