= Peacock Island (Connecticut) =

Island owned by Stratford, Connecticut, U.S.

Peacock Island is the smallest of the four islands owned by Stratford, Connecticut (USA), in the Housatonic River between I-95 and the Merritt Parkway. The island is north of the Moses Wheeler Bridge, west of Carting Island, southwest of Long Island (Connecticut), Pope's Flat, and south of Fowler Island in Milford and the Igor I. Sikorsky Memorial Bridge. The island is uninhabited except for occasional visits by anglers, bird watchers and duck hunters.

== Geography ==
41°12′43″N 73°6′39″W

- Elevation: ~3 feet (0.91 m)
- The mercury content was evaluated in 2003 at ~300 to 5,000 ppb.

== Transportation ==
All transportation to and from the island is by boat.
