= Long Island (Connecticut) =

Island in Connecticut, United States

Long Island is the second smallest of the four islands owned by Stratford, Connecticut in the Housatonic River between I-95 and the Merritt Parkway. The island is north of the Moses Wheeler Bridge, northeast of Carting Island and Peacock Island (Connecticut), west of Pope's Flat and south of Fowler Island in Milford and the Igor I. Sikorsky Memorial Bridge. The island is uninhabited except for occasional visits by anglers, bird watchers and duck hunters.

== Geography ==
41°13′5″N 73°6′48″W

- Elevation: ~3 feet (0.91 m)
- The mercury content was evaluated in 2003 at ~300 to 5000 ppb.

== Transportation ==
All transportation to and from the island is by boat.
