= Washington Bridge (Connecticut) =

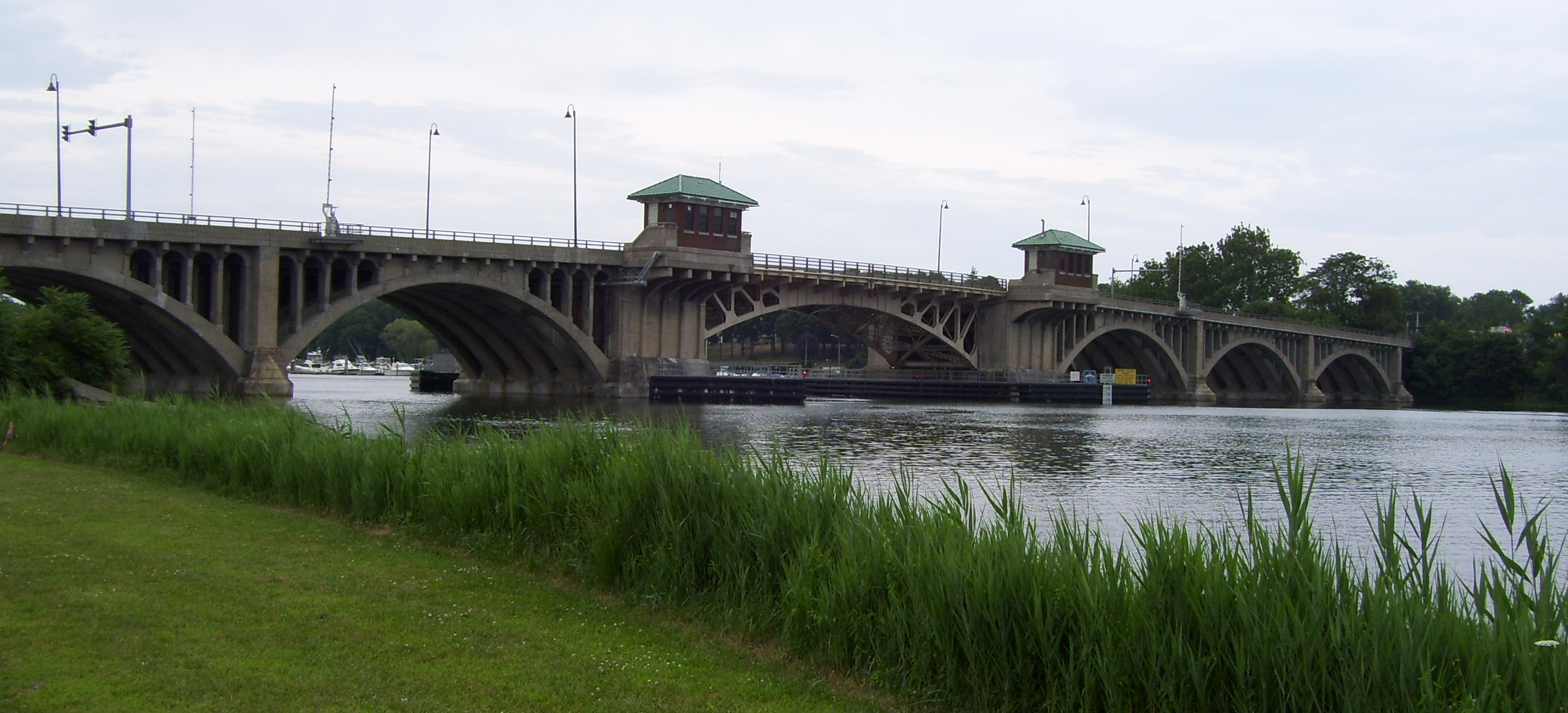
- The Washington Bridge, as seen from the Stratford side of the Housatonic River
- Coordinates: 41°12′01″N 73°06′37″W
- Carries: 4 lanes of US 1
- Crosses: Housatonic River
- Locale: Stratford and Milford (Connecticut)
- Official name: Washington Bridge
- Maintained by: Connecticut Department of Transportation
- CT bridge number: 327

Characteristics
- Design: steel trunnion-bearing movable (bascule bridge)
- Total length: 859 feet (262 m)
- Width: 43 feet (13 m)
- No. of spans: 12

History
- Opened: 1921 (reconstructed 1989)

Statistics
- Daily traffic: 23,300
- Toll: None

Location
- Interactive map of Washington Bridge

- Washington Bridge
- U.S. National Register of Historic Places
- Location within Connecticut Location within the United States
- Location: U.S. Route 1 at Housatonic River, Milford, Connecticut
- Coordinates: 41°12′1″N 73°6′39″W
- Area: less than one acre
- Built: 1921
- Architect: Connecticut Highway Department; Waddell & Son, et al.
- Architectural style: Late 19th and 20th Century Revivals, open-spandrel concrete arch
- NRHP reference No.: 04001093
- Added to NRHP: September 29, 2004

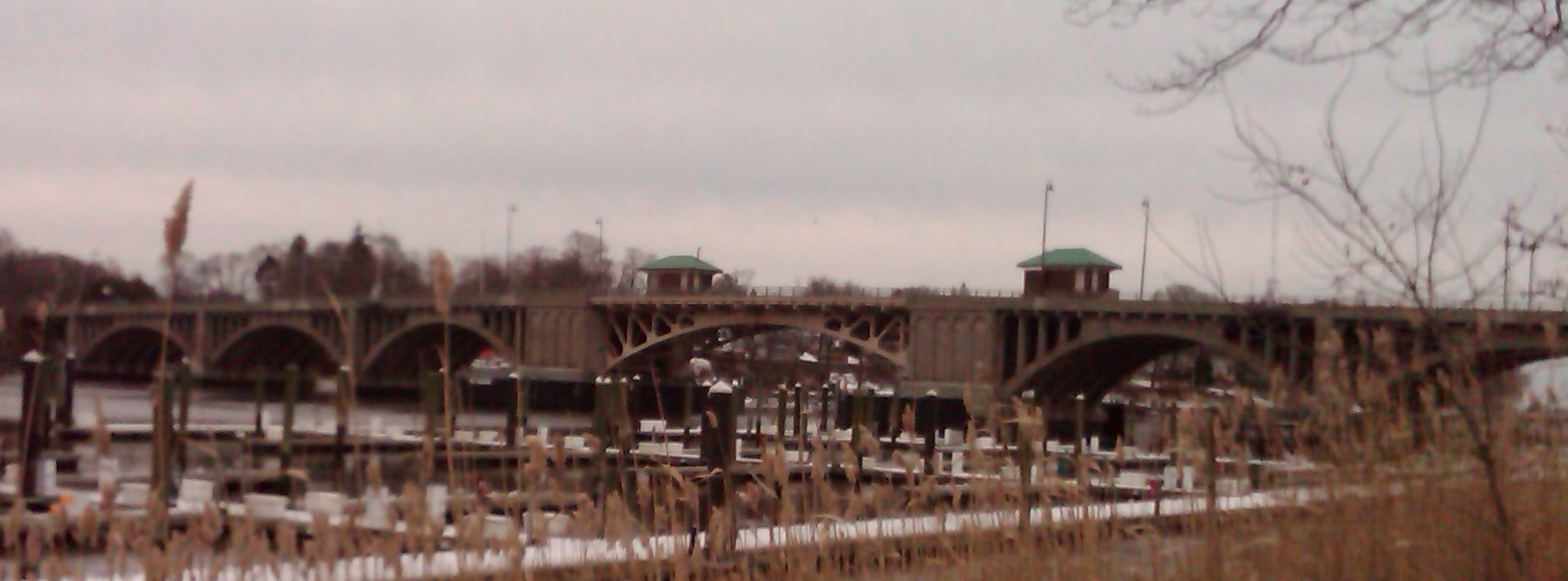
The Washington Bridge from the Stratford shoreline.

The Washington Bridge, also known as the Devon Bridge, carries U.S. Route 1 (U.S. Route 1) over the Housatonic River in the U.S. state of Connecticut, connecting the city of Milford to the town of Stratford. Its geographic location is N 41.20037 by W −73.11039. It is considered architecturally notable by the National Register of Historic Places for its five 100-foot-long (30 m) arches. It is designated Bridge No. 327 by the state Department of Transportation.

The Washington Bridge is the longest drawbridge on the Boston Post Road. It is a steel trunnion-bearing bascule drawbridge. 859 feet (262 m) in length by 43 feet (13 m) in width, featuring two lanes in each direction for automotive traffic and a sidewalk for pedestrians. The clear channel for shipping is 125 feet (38 m) wide. The bridge, which cost $1.5 million in 1921, was the largest and most expensive project of the state highway department up to the date of its construction.

== History ==
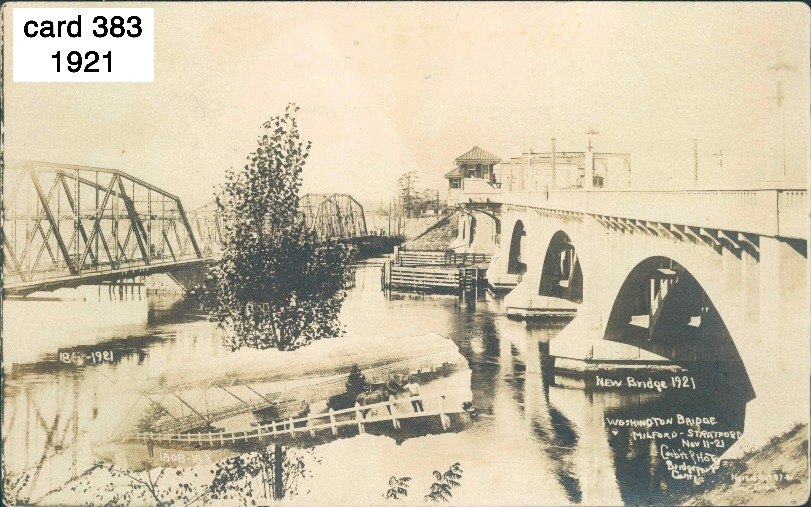
Postcard displaying the current and two prior bridges

Prior to the current bridge there were two previous spans, serving from 1803 to 1894, and from 1894 to 1921 (see postcard image).

The first noted transport across the river at this point was a ferry that began service around May 1758. The Sons of the American Revolution note that this crossing was likely used by George Washington on his journey from Philadelphia to Cambridge, Massachusetts to assume his command of the Colonial Army in 1775.

The first bridge at this point was proposed in 1803 by the Milford and Stratford Bridge Company, which changed its name to the Washington Bridge Company that same year. The first permanent standing (wooden) bridge opened in 1813, complete with a toll. This bridge was rebuilt at least twice: once in 1807 when ice flows carried the bridge out to sea and again in 1868 when it was struck by the steamer Monitor.

In 1844 Governor Roger Sherman Baldwin vetoed a bill requiring the Washington Bridge Company to make alterations to the bridge at its own expense even though the conditions requiring these changes did not exist when the bridge was originally built. The veto was overridden by an act of the Connecticut General Assembly.

In 1845 the Supreme Court of the United States ruled that the act was unconstitutional in Washington Bridge Company v. Stewart.

The second bridge opened in 1894 and was built of iron for $88,500. It featured two 215 feet (66 m) fixed spans and a single 200 feet (61 m) swinging span in the center, with a walking path on the northern side. A trolley line was originally objected to by the New York, New Haven & Hartford Railroad but was ultimately added in the southern lane.

Built in 1921, the original fabricator of the current bridge was Bethlehem Steel. It was designed by John Alexander Low Waddell, a noted structural engineer with over 1000 structures to his credit. Originally the bridge supported two streetcar tracks and two lanes for passenger cars. At the time of its construction, it was the most expensive project yet undertaken by the Connecticut Department of Transportation, costing $1.5 million.

The Washington Bridge was listed on the National Register of Historic Places in 2004.

== Non-motorized access ==
The Washington Bridge is the only crossing of the Housatonic River for pedestrians or bicyclists near Long Island Sound. The next available crossing would be the newly reconstructed Igor I. Sikorsky Memorial Bridge roughly 3.5 miles (5.6 km) upriver.

It is illegal to fish from the bridge.

== Renovations ==
The bridge has seen several renovations, including those completed in:

- 1935: Removal of streetcar apparatus to increase passenger car traffic from two lanes to four.
- 1989: Repaving and superstructure (including concrete parapet and railing).
- 2007: $18.5 million overhaul which included fibreglass fenders for the bridge piers, installation of its own generator, a new bridge control system, and a complete overhaul to the mechanical apparatus.

== Safety inspection results ==
Inspection ratings from the National Bridge Inventory as of September 2010 were:

- Deck condition rating: Fair (5 out of 9)
- Superstructure condition rating: Fair (5 out of 9)
- Substructure condition rating: Fair (5 out of 9)
- Sufficiency rating: 55.4 (out of 100)

== See also ==
- List of crossings of the Housatonic River
- Moses Wheeler Bridge: Crosses the Housatonic River on nearby Interstate 95
- Igor I. Sikorsky Memorial Bridge: Crosses the Housatonic River on nearby Route 15
- National Register of Historic Places listings in Fairfield County, Connecticut
- National Register of Historic Places listings in New Haven County, Connecticut
- List of bridges on the National Register of Historic Places in Connecticut
