= Tomlinson Lift Bridge =

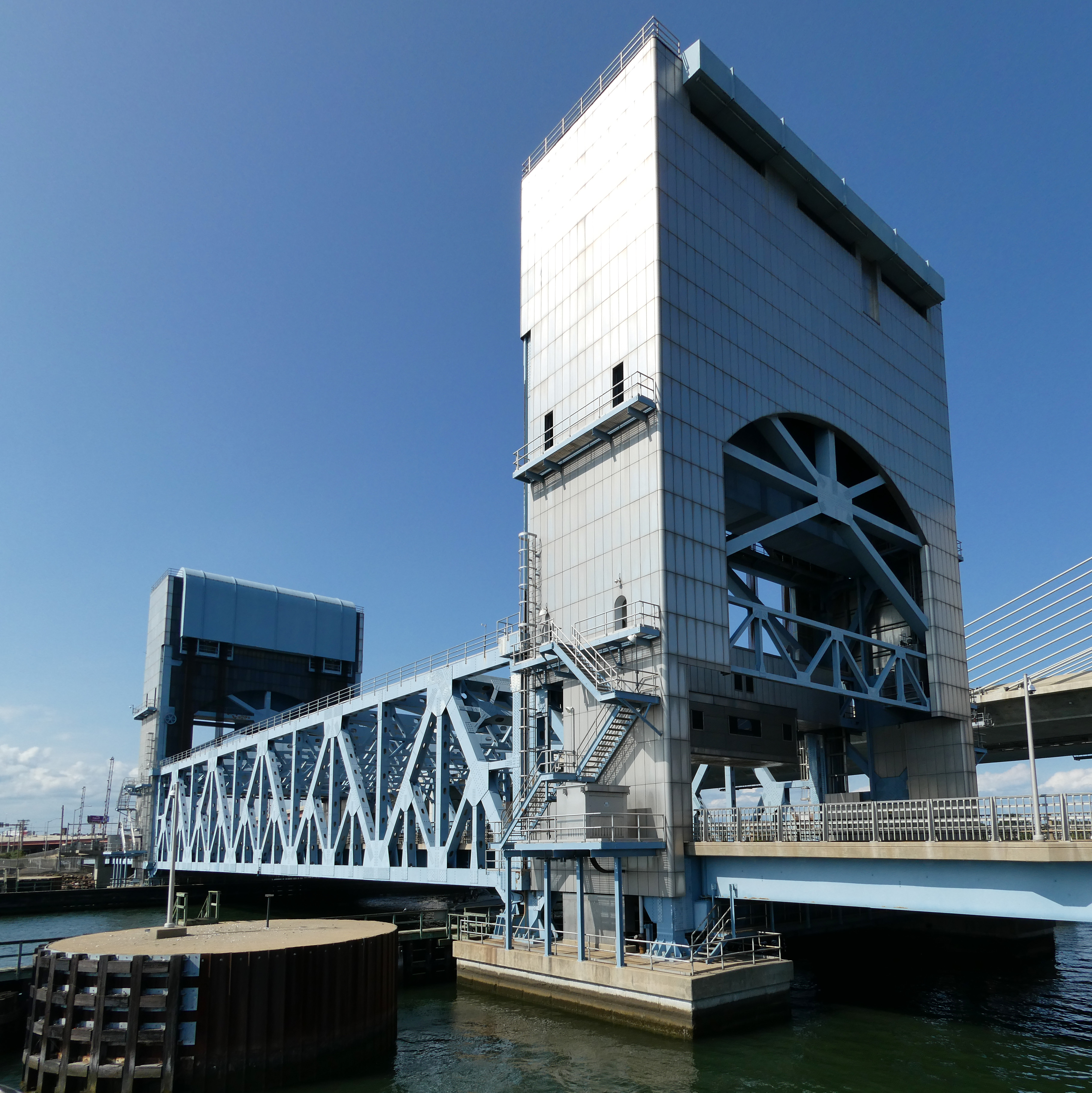
- Tomlinson Lift Bridge in August 2022
- Coordinates: 41.298296°N 72.905292°W
- Carries: four lanes of US 1, 1 track of Providence & Worcester Railroad, sidewalk
- Crosses: Quinnipiac River
- Locale: New Haven, New Haven County, Connecticut, United States
- Owner: ConnDOT

Characteristics
- Design: Vertical-lift bridge
- Material: Steel
- Total length: 283.5 metres (930 ft)
- Width: 28 metres (92 ft)
- Longest span: 82.3 metres (270 ft)

History
- Designer: Hardesty & Hanover, LLP
- Engineering design by: Nicholas J. Altebrando, Thomas A. Duffy, Michael D. Hawkins, Timothy J. Noles
- Construction start: 1922
- Construction end: 1797, 1885, 1924, 2002
- Construction cost: USD$125,000,000

Location
- Interactive map of Tomlinson Lift Bridge

The Tomlinson Lift Bridge is a crossing of the Quinnipiac River in New Haven, Connecticut. The bridge forms a segment of U.S. Route 1. The Tomlinson Vertical Lift Bridge carries four lanes of traffic across New Haven Harbor and a single-track freight line owned by the Providence & Worcester Railroad that connects the waterfront with the Northeast Corridor line of Metro North and CSX. A sidewalk is present along the southern edge of the bridge.

== History ==
The first bridge here was erected in 1797 by Isaac Tomlinson's group to replace profits from their ferry ruined by a new bridge. This 27-foot (8.2 m)-wide covered wooden truss bridge included a draw to allow vessels through. It has also been described as a "wood and sandstone" bridge.

The second bridge, 1885-1922, was an iron bridge which was never particularly good, having been salvaged from a scrap yard, and not thought well of even before then. By 1913, this bridge was opening 17,000 times a year. Plans for replacement were created during World War I.

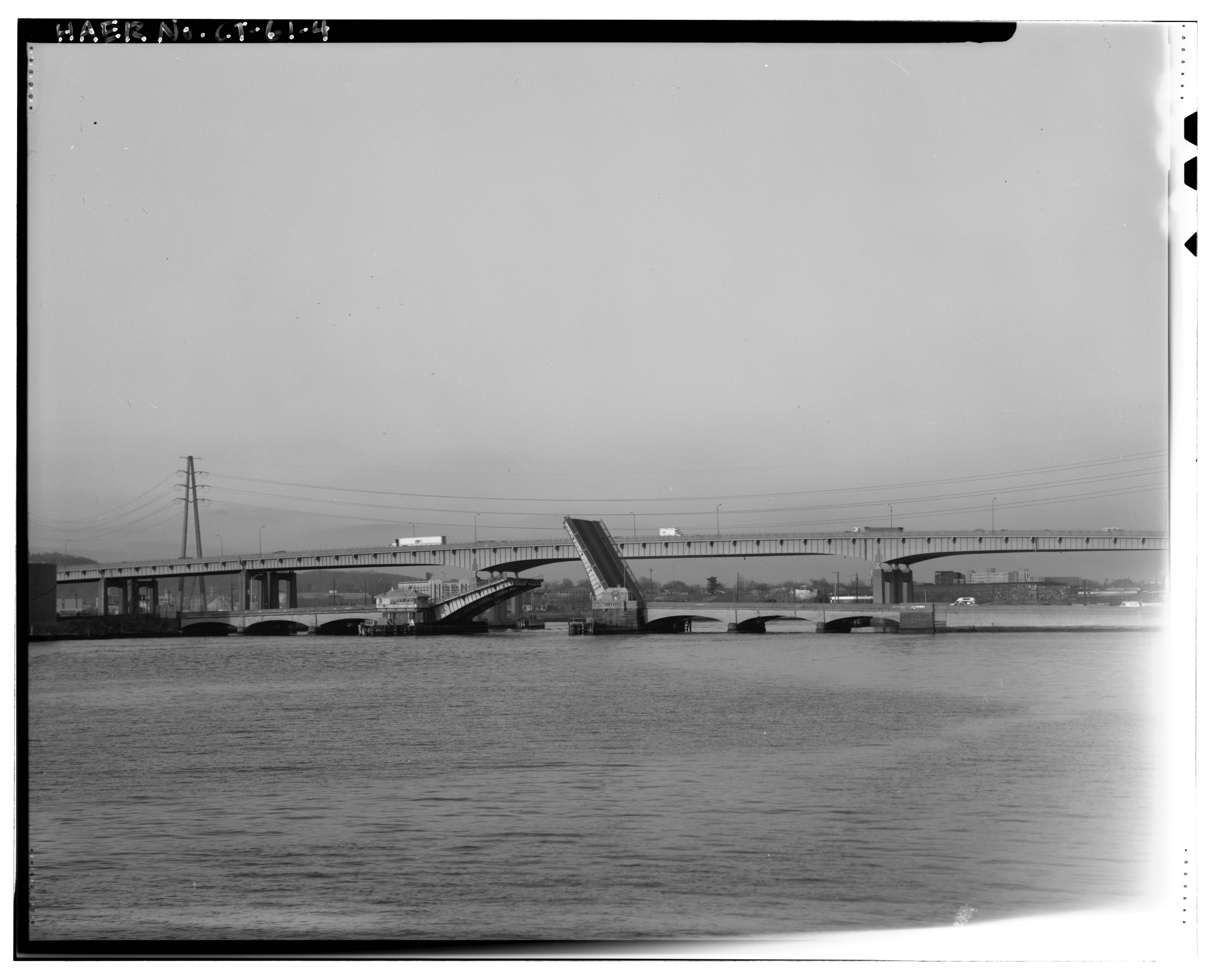
Third bridge, partially raised

The third bridge on-site was a trunioned double-leaf bascule drawbridge with its counterweights in a closed pit underneath, built between 1921 and 1924. It was designed by engineer Ernest W. Wiggin of New Haven in the Beaux-Arts style, based on a bascule design by Joseph B. Strauss. Before the completion of the adjacent Q Bridge, it was carrying 30,000 vehicles a day. When closed, clearance under the bridge was 12 feet (3.7 m) at mean high water, ranging from 8–17 feet (2.4–5.2 m) at extreme high tide to extreme low tide. The channel width was 117 feet (36 m), with a total span length between centers of 148 feet (45 m). The builder was the Phoenix Bridge Company of Philadelphia, Pennsylvania.

The current bridge, the fourth one on this site, is a lift bridge 270 feet (82 m) long and 92 feet (28 m) wide, a significant improvement from the previous (third) bridge's 117-foot (36 m) channel. The mechanism raises the lift span 62 feet (19 m) with 3,000,000-pound (1,400,000 kg) counterweights on each of the two 150-foot (46 m) towers on either end. The bridge cost $120 million, designed by Hardesty & Hanover LLP of New York City, is 90 feet (27 m) wide and 270 feet (82 m) long with two 30-foot (9.1 m) tower spans and six 100-foot (30 m)-long approach spans. The lift span weighs almost 6,500,000 pounds (2,900,000 kg) with a total load-to-move of 13,000,000 pounds (5,900,000 kg). It provides a channel with 240 feet (73 m) horizontal clearance and 13 feet (4.0 m) vertical clearance when the span is closed, and an additional 62 feet (19 m) vertical clearance when it is open.

The project was part of the New Haven Harbor Crossing Improvement Program Securing the bridge's lift piers initially proved difficult because rock elevation and slope differed along the route. To secure the piers, teeth were welded to the tip of 20-in-diameter pile shells that were then drilled into the bedrock. For some piles, an adequate seal was not achieved until the pile had been seated into 5 ft. of bedrock.

== See also ==
- List of bridges documented by the Historic American Engineering Record in Connecticut
- List of movable bridges in Connecticut
