= Pearl Harbor Memorial Bridge (Connecticut) =

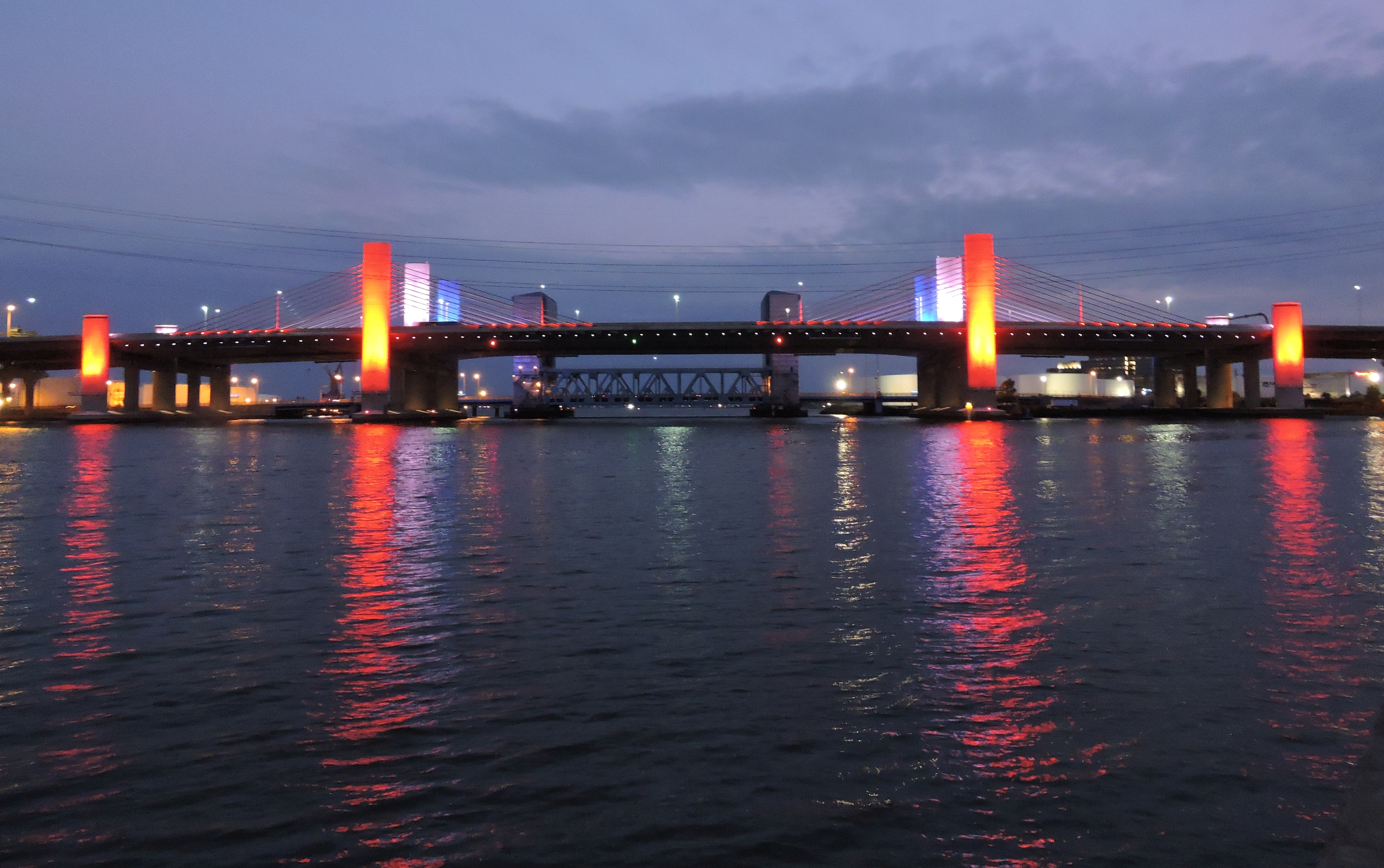
- The Pearl Harbor Memorial Bridge, locally known as the Q Bridge, crosses over the Quinnipiac River.
- Coordinates: 41°17′55″N 72°54′14″W
- Carries: 10 lanes of I-95
- Crosses: Quinnipiac River
- Locale: New Haven, Connecticut, U.S.
- Maintained by: Connecticut Department of Transportation

Characteristics
- Design: Extradosed bridge
- Total length: 4,735 ft (1,443.2 m)
- Width: 182 ft (55.4 m)
- Height: 150 ft (45.7 m)
- Longest span: 515 ft (157.0 m)
- Clearance below: 60 ft (18.3 m)

History
- Opened: 1958 (original span) reconstructed 2005-2015

Location
- Interactive map of Pearl Harbor Memorial Bridge

The Pearl Harbor Memorial Bridge, commonly referred to as the Q Bridge by locals, is an extradosed bridge that carries Interstate 95 (Connecticut Turnpike) over the mouth of the Quinnipiac River in New Haven, in the U.S. state of Connecticut. This bridge replaced the original 1,300 m (0.8 mi) span which opened on January 2, 1958. The old bridge had a girder and floorbeam design where steel beams supported a concrete bridge deck that carried three lanes of traffic in each direction with no inside or outside shoulders. The bridge was officially dedicated as the Pearl Harbor Memorial Bridge in 1995 to commemorate the attack on Pearl Harbor.

The old Pearl Harbor Memorial Bridge was replaced by a $554 million 10-lane extradosed bridge; the northbound span of which opened to traffic on June 22, 2012. Southbound traffic was shifted onto the new bridge, sharing the northbound span with northbound traffic until the new southbound span was completed in late 2015. Since the Gibbs Street Bridge in Portland, Oregon was redesigned from an extradosed span to a box girder bridge, the Pearl Harbor Memorial Bridge was the first extradosed bridge completed in the United States when it fully opened in September 2015. The new bridge is the centerpiece of a $2 billion megaproject called the New Haven Harbor Crossing Improvement Program.

== History ==
(Old) Pearl Harbor Memorial Bridge
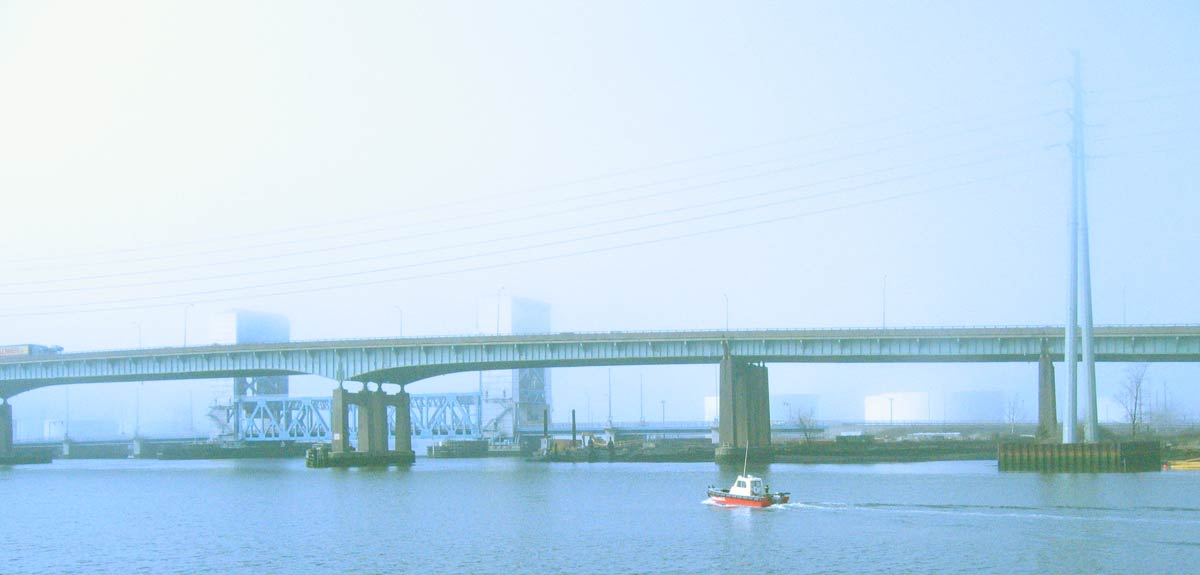
- Q Bridge with the Tomlinson Lift Bridge behind it
- Coordinates: 41°17′55″N 72°54′14″W
- Carries: Six lanes of I-95 / Conn. Turnpike
- Crosses: Quinnipiac River
- Locale: New Haven, Connecticut
- Maintained by: Connecticut Department of Transportation

Characteristics
- Design: Girder and floorbeam
- Total length: 4,735 ft (1,443.2 m)
- Width: 84 ft (25.6 m)
- Clearance below: 60 ft (18.3 m)

History
- Opened: January 2, 1958 (Reconstructed 2005-2015)
- Closed: July 26, 2013

Location
- Interactive map of (Old) Pearl Harbor Memorial Bridge

The original span at this site was created as part of a project to build the Connecticut Turnpike, a toll road stretching from Greenwich to Killingly. This steel girder bridge was completed January 2, 1958. It was designed for a capacity of 90,000 vehicles per day. By 1993, the Quinnipiac River bridge was considered outdated, and traffic bottlenecks had been a chronic problem.

== Signature span replacement ==
=== Returning to the drawing board ===
In response to the controversy over the design of the new bridge, CONNDOT organized the Intermodal Concept Development Committee (ICDC), which included representatives from New Haven, East Haven, and Branford, environmental groups, local business associations, the FHWA, the Army Corps of Engineers, and the Coast Guard.

The ICDC examined over 100 alternatives before narrowing the list to seven in the Supplemental DEIS, presented in April 1997. The final EIS was issued in March 1999, which called for a 10-lane Q Bridge; eight lanes to East Haven and six lanes to Branford, and a new Metro-North/Shore Line East train station at State Street in New Haven. The FHWA issued a Record of Decision, approving the FEIS in August 1999. CONNDOT is preparing two separate studies to reconstruct the remainder of the corridor through the Long Wharf section of New Haven and West Haven.

In 2001, New Haven Mayor John DeStefano, Jr. pressed CONNDOT and the FHWA to design the new Q Bridge as a signature span. A cable-stayed design was originally considered, but the Federal Aviation Administration raised concerns over the height of the towers interfering with the approach into Tweed-New Haven Airport, which compelled CONNDOT to consider an extradosed bridge, which retains the aesthetic qualities of a cable-stayed structure but can be built with shorter towers due to the roadway also being supported by girders (in this case prestressed concrete box girders).

Construction on the eastern approach to the bridge in Branford and East Haven began in 2001; while work began in 2004 on the earthworks for the western approach around the I-91/Route 34 interchange. The United Illuminating Company erected new pylons and rerouted its 115 kilovolt transmission lines away from the bridge in 2003, to make way for the larger bridge to be built.

=== More construction delays ===
Construction on the bridge itself was originally set to begin in 2005 and be completed in 2012. However, two historically significant structures—the former Yale Boathouse and the Fitch Foundry—sat directly in the path of the new bridge. The City of New Haven demanded that these two structures be preserved. Mayor DeStefano further argued that CONNDOT should include the expansion of I-95 through Long Wharf and West Haven into the overall plan instead of pursuing these projects separately. Given the impasse between CONNDOT and the City of New Haven over these two issues, the FHWA threatened to pull funding for the project unless the city and state could come to a consensus on how to proceed while keeping the project's costs under control. Realizing that such a move would effectively void the already-approved EIS and require a new one to be developed, CONNDOT and the city of New Haven made a compromise in late 2005 that called for CONNDOT to provide $30 million in funding for a new boathouse on Long Wharf—eventually known as the Canal Dock Boathouse—that would incorporate a chunk of the old boathouse's façade. In exchange, the City of New Haven agreed to allow CONNDOT to continue the environmental and design studies on the Long Wharf and West Haven sections apart from the I-91/Route 34 to Branford segment of I-95 that includes the Q-Bridge.

The project was let to bid in May 2006, but there were no bids received by the December 27, 2006 deadline. Two construction firms interested in the project cited—among other things—the absence of an escalator clause in the project contract to cover the rising cost of fuel and raw materials for the lack of bids.

=== Staged construction ===
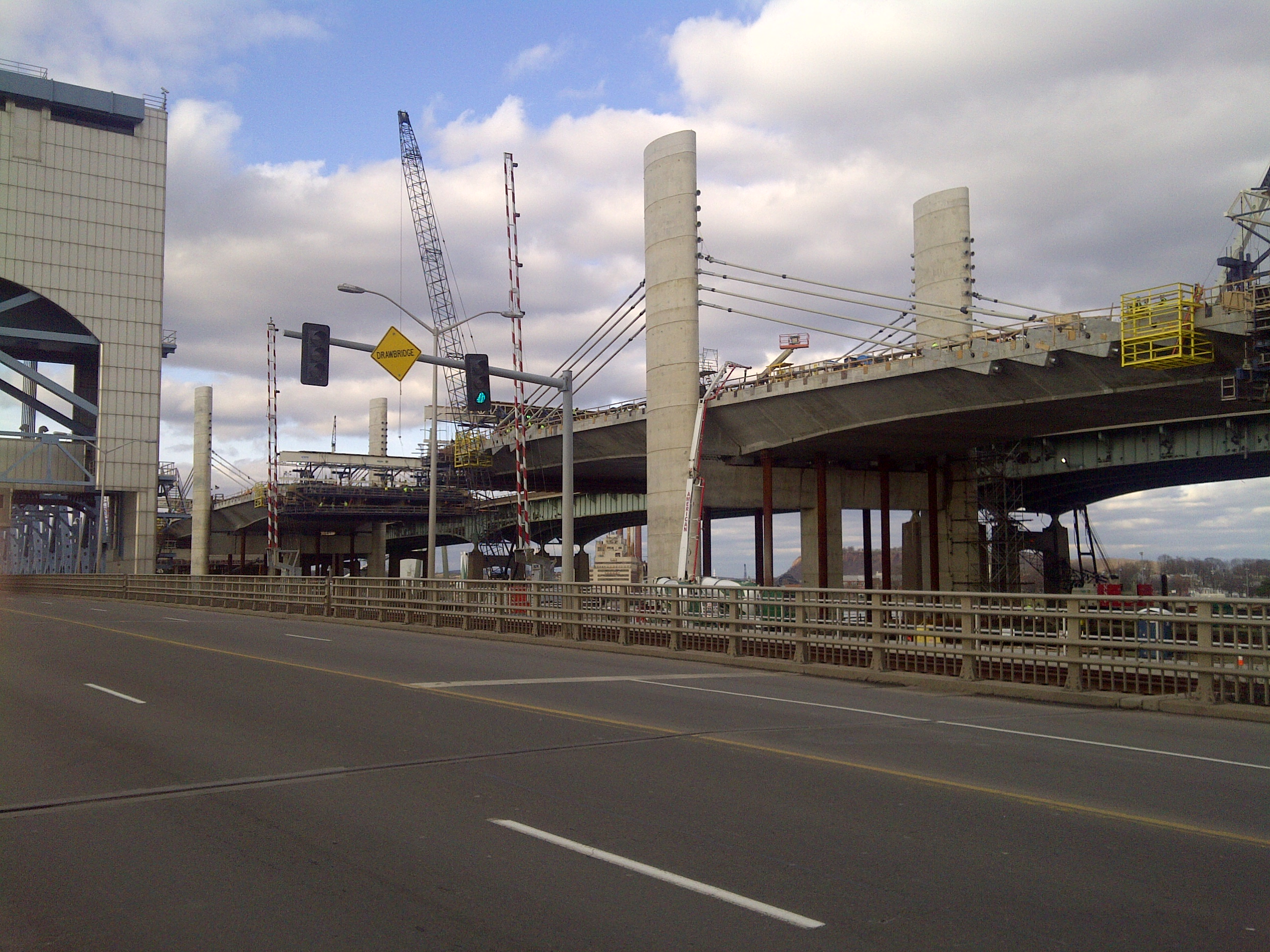
Construction of the new Pearl Harbor Memorial Bridge (Q-Bridge) as viewed from the Tomlinson Bridge in 2011

In response, CONNDOT divided the bridge project into multiple contracts that were let in stages as construction progresses. While this makes the project more manageable for contractors and highway officials, this approach significantly added to the time required to complete the new bridge.

==== Removal of buildings and relocating sewer lines ====
The first bridge contract, which includes the demolition of buildings where the new bridge will stand, was let in October 2006. Work under this contract was completed in August 2007 with the demolition of the Yale Boathouse and the Fitch Foundry where the west abutment of the new bridge will be.

A second contract was let on June 1, 2007, to relocate two 42-inch (1.06 meter) diameter sanitary sewer lines that lie directly beneath where part of the new bridge will be built. Construction of the new sewer lines involved slant drilling through bedrock under New Haven Harbor. The Middlesex Company, a construction contractor based in Littleton, Massachusetts, was the prime contractor on the $20 million project.

==== Building the abutments and pier foundations ====
The third contract, known as Contract B1 in official documents, which covers construction of the bridge abutments and pier foundations for the northbound lanes was let on October 31, 2007. Four construction firms submitted bids for this $137 million contract February 6, 2008, according to bid results from CONNDOT. The contract was awarded to a joint venture between the Middlesex Company and Pittsfield, Maine-based Cianbro Corporation in April 2008.

==== Completing the new bridge and removing the original span ====
The final contract, known as Contract B, will construct the remainder of the new bridge and demolish the existing span. Contract B was awarded to a joint venture between Walsh Construction of Chicago, Illinois and Denver, Colorado-based PCL Constructors for $417 million in July 2009. The joint venture company is also known as Walsh-PCL Joint Venture II. The two companies previously formed a joint venture to replace the Moses Wheeler Bridge over the Housatonic River several miles west in Stratford.

=== How the new bridge was built ===
The new Pearl Harbor Memorial Bridge was built in three stages. The first stage included the construction of the southern span alongside and to the south of the original bridge, which now carries northbound lanes of I-95. On June 25, 2012, the new northbound bridge was opened and carried three travel lanes in each direction while the old bridge was demolished and the remaining half of the new span was built. Once the southbound span was complete, the southbound lanes were shifted to the second span. Currently each span carries three lanes in each direction, pending completion of construction of the I-91/Route 34 interchange immediately to the west. Adding to the challenge of building the new bridge is that work must be coordinated with the ongoing reconstruction of the massive I-91/Route 34 interchange just west of the bridge. As a result, completion of the project is now scheduled for 2016, four years later than originally planned, although this might change as the southern half was opened six months early.

=== Northbound span ===
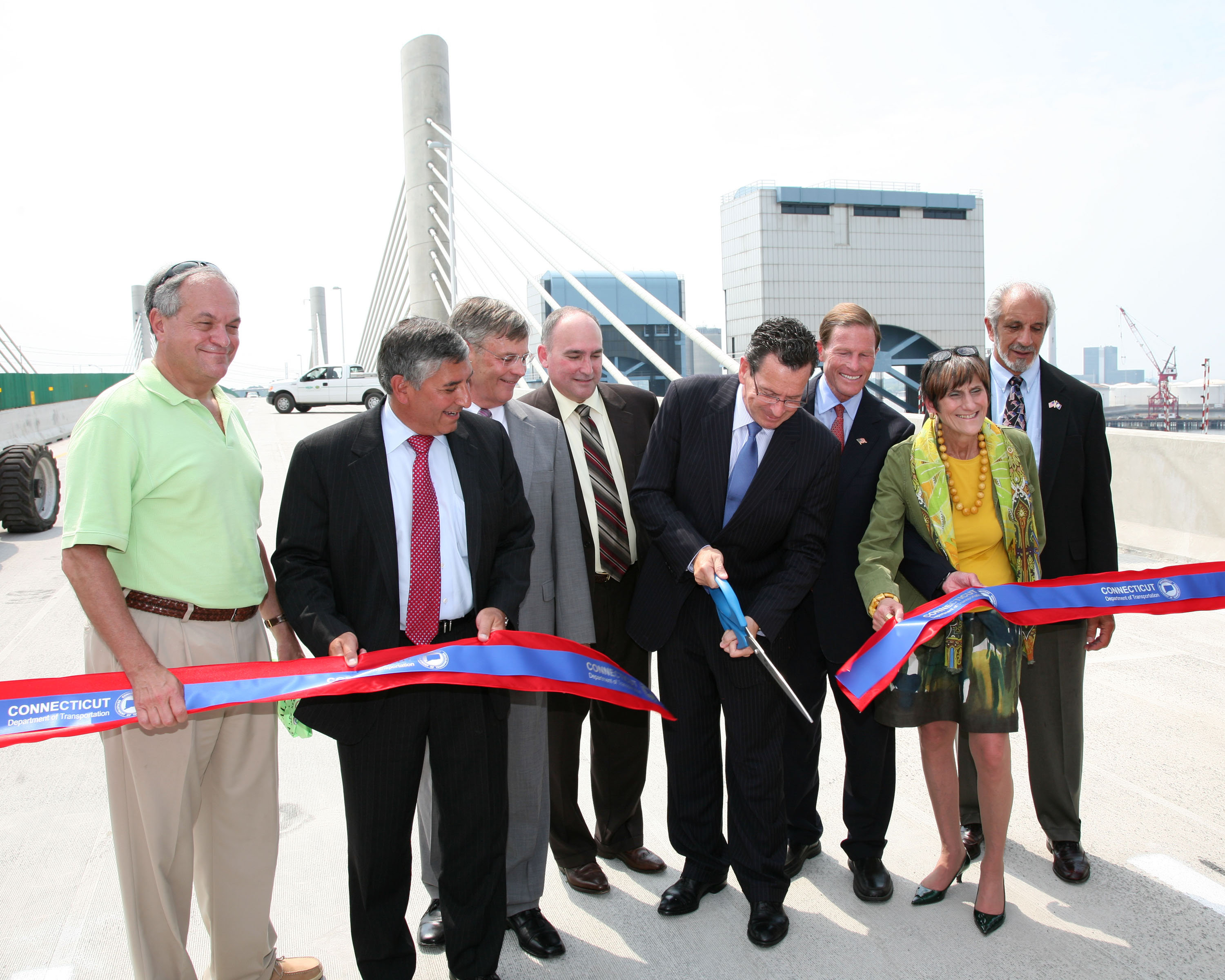
Officials, including Governor Dannel Malloy, Senator Richard Blumenthal, Congresswoman Rosa DeLauro, and mayor John DeStefano Jr., cut the ribbon on the northbound span on June 22, 2012

The Northbound section of the bridge opened to three lanes of traffic on June 25, 2012, after being completed 6 months ahead of schedule. On July 26, 2013, southbound traffic was shifted from the original bridge over to the new northbound span. The northbound span will carry three lanes of both northbound and southbound traffic while the original bridge is demolished, and the new southbound span is built.

=== Southbound span ===
On July 17, 2015, construction workers held a barbecue lunch on the southern span of the new bridge to celebrate its completion. Officials expect the new southern span to partially open, with an off-ramp to I-91 northbound in September 2015, and to fully open with complete access ramps by mid-2016.

== Awards ==
The bridge was named the Grand Prize winner of AASHTO's 2016 America's Transportation Awards, prevailing over 83 other entries from state DOTs nationwide.
