= FritzFrog =

Botnet spreading with a peer-to-peer-based malware

FritzFrog is a decentralized botnet that uses P2P protocols to distribute control over all of its nodes, thereby avoiding having one controller or single point of failure.
