= Rotorhead =

Helicopter Mechanism

In helicopter design, the rotorhead is the part of the rotor assembly that joins the blades to the shaft, cyclic and collective mechanisms. It is sometimes referred to as the rotor "hub". The rotorhead is where the lift force from the rotor blades act. The rotorhead is connected to the main drive shaft via the Jesus nut, and houses several other components such as the swash plate, flight control linkages and fly-bars. The rotor hub is also where the centre of gravity acts on the helicopter.

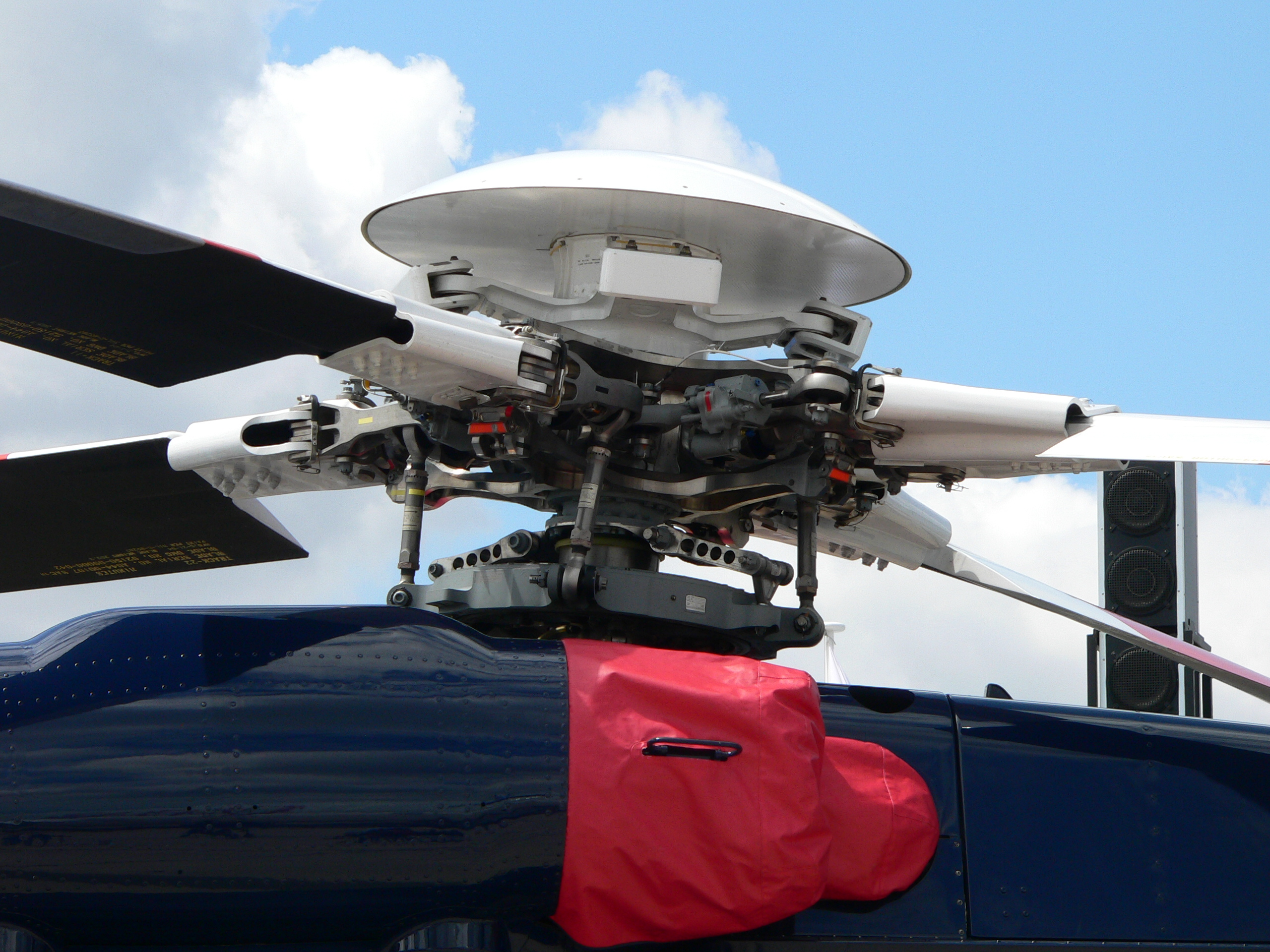
The rotor head of a Sikorsky S-92

== Types ==
Rotorheads can be classified into 3 main types:

- Articulated
- Semi-Rigid
- Rigid

=== Articulated Rotorhead ===
An articulated rotorhead system is one where the individual blades are free to flap, lag and change pitch. This is done by mounting the blades on flapping and lagging hinges and pitch change bearings.

=== Semi-Rigid ===
A semi-rigid rotorhead does not have individual flapping or drag hinges but provides for flapping through gimbal mounting. A common example of a semi-rigid rotor is a teetering rotorhead found on the Robinson family of helicopters.

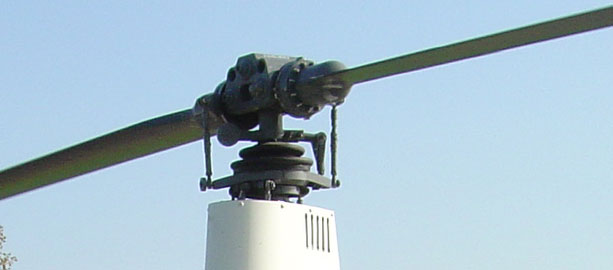
A Robinson R22 Teetering Rotorhead

=== Rigid ===
A rigid rotorhead has no flapping or lag hinges but does have pitch change bearings. The flapping and lagging movement is accommodated by flexible sections (commonly elastomeric bearings) at the blade root or blade attachment. When using composite blades, the blades can also flex to provide a flapping motion.

Benefits of rigid rotor system are:

- Less control response lag
- Reduced maintenance
