= Fracture critical bridge =

Bridge vulnerable to collapse due to collapse

A fracture critical bridge is a bridge or similar span that is vulnerable to collapse of one or more spans as a result of the failure in tension of a single element. While a fracture critical design is not considered unsafe, it is subject to special inspection requirements that focus on the tension elements of its structure.

== Definition ==
For a bridge to be defined as fracture critical:

- It must possess structural members that are subject to tensile stresses from bending or axial forces.
- The members must be non-redundant, lacking alternate load paths or means of safely redistributing forces in the event of a tensile failure.

While members subject to compressive stress may also fail catastrophically, they typically do not fail from crack initiation.

Examples of bridge designs that would typically be considered fracture critical are:

- Most truss bridges with two main load-bearing assemblies
- Two-beam girder bridges (three-beam bridges in California)
- Two-cell steel box girder bridges (three-beam bridges in California)
- Main suspension cables and hanger cables of suspension bridges
- Cable-stayed bridges
- Steel ties in tied-arch or tied-truss bridges
- Pin-and-hanger assemblies in two-beam bridges
- Steel floor beams and cross girders
- Steel bent assemblies under tensile stress
- Movable and pontoon bridges

== History ==
The designation and inspection protocols for fracture critical bridges were developed following the failure of an eyebar at the Silver Bridge at Point Pleasant, West Virginia, which precipitated the bridge's collapse into the Ohio River in 1967, resulting in 46 deaths. The disaster resulted in the establishment of the National Bridge Inventory, using the National Bridge Inspection Standards (NBIS) (CFR Title 23, Part 650).

In May 2022 new NBIS guidance established additional terminology to describe new forms of redundancy. These are:

- System redundancy, in which the fracture of a primary member will not result in collapse
- Internal redundancy, in which a fracture will not propagate through a member that is not system redundant, the member being itself redundant
- Load path redundancy, where three or more primary load-carrying elements are present

== See also ==
- Fracture mechanics
- Single point of failure
- Jesus nut
