= New Haven Harbor Crossing Improvement Program =

Highway construction project

Location
- New Haven, Connecticut
- Roads at junction: I-95 / Conn. Turnpike; I-91; US 1; Route 34

Construction
- Constructed: 2000-2018
- Maintained by: Connecticut Department of Transportation

The New Haven Harbor Crossing Corridor Improvement Program is a $2 billion megaproject in the city of New Haven, Connecticut, to reconstruct and widen some 13 miles of highway in the New Haven area, which included 7.2 miles of Interstate 95 along with other related transportation improvements. The centerpiece of the project is the replacement of the Pearl Harbor Memorial Bridge, which carries Interstate 95 over the Quinnipiac River. The program also included the reconstruction of parts of Interstate 91, Connecticut Route 34, and U.S. Route 1 that connect to and run near the bridge, as well as other related transportation upgrades.

== Overview and Planning ==
The Connecticut Turnpike opened to traffic in 1958, and was designed to carry 40,000 vehicles a day. By 1993, however, it was carrying over 140,000 vehicles a day, with some sources saying that figure has since ballooned to over 200,000.

In October 1989, the state of Connecticut initiated a study to evaluate a 7.2-mile stretch of Interstate 95 between West Haven and Branford. This was followed by a January 1992 draft environmental impact statement (DEIS) outlining several options, which ranged from simply widening I-95 to building a light rail line to parallel I-95. Residents and officials criticized the original plan, which caused the state to go back to the drawing board. After drafting a new plan in 1997, the state released a final environmental impact statement in March 1999. Opposition to the new plan was significantly lower than the old one, and so the state continued to advance with its plans.

Design sessions took place in late 1999/early 2000 and construction commenced in October 2000. The state divided the program into 25 separate contracts undertaken by 10 different construction firms in order to combat the increasing costs of labor and construction material.

== Construction ==
=== New Haven State Street ===
The first project under the program constructed the New Haven State Street train station. The station opened on June 7, 2002.

=== Eastern approach ===
The eastern approach to the Pearl Harbor Memorial Bridge was reconstructed and widened through two contracts, officially referred to as Contracts C1 and C2 at a total cost of $120 million. Contract C1 reconstructed the eastern approach from Lake Saltonstall through East Haven, while Contract C2 reconstructed I-95 from the East Haven/New Haven border to the eastern abutment of the Pearl Harbor Memorial Bridge. O & G Industries of Torrington, Connecticut, was the primary contractor for both contracts. While a train accident, harsh weather, and several design changes delayed the completion of Contract C1 by more than a year, O & G Industries completed Contract C2 in August 2008, one year ahead of schedule. Further east, a third contract officially referred to as Contract D, reconstructed and widened I-95 from the Lake Saltonstall bridge to Exit 54 in Branford. Pittsfield, Massachusetts-based Middlesex Company was the prime contractor for the $36 million contract. Aside from resurfacing, restriping and widening from four lanes to six, no physical construction was performed on the I-95 bridge over Lake Saltonstall as it was rebuilt and widened in 1995.

=== Western approach and I-91/Route 34 interchange ===
Reconstructing the western approach to the Pearl Harbor Memorial Bridge was divided into several contracts: E, E1 and E2. Contract E1 involved the construction of earthworks that support the western abutment of the new bridge and carry the new ramps to I-91 and Route 34. L.G. DeFelice Construction was originally awarded the $14 million contract, but the company went out of business midway through the project. The contract was picked up and completed on schedule by Hallberg Construction in 2006. Contract E2 involved building the flyover bridge that carries the new ramp from I-95 northbound to Route 34 and added a transition lane to I-95 in each direction through Long Wharf. This contract was completed on June 6, 2011, by Walsh Construction Company of Canton, Massachusetts, at a cost of $90 million. Contract E completed the remainder of the interchange ramps, bridges, and new Turnpike mainline roadways. This contract was let on April 11, 2011, and ended on November 18, 2016.

=== Pearl Harbor Memorial Bridge construction ===
The first bridge contract, which included the demolition of the Yale Boathouse and the Fitch Foundry, was let in October 2006. A second contract was let on June 1, 2007, to relocate two 42-inch (1.06 meter) diameter sanitary sewer lines that lie directly beneath where part of the new bridge will be built. Construction of the new sewer lines involved slant drilling through bedrock under New Haven Harbor. The Middlesex Company, a construction contractor based in Littleton, Massachusetts, was the prime contractor on the $20 million project.

The third contract, known as Contract B1 in official documents, which covers construction of the bridge abutments and pier foundations for the northbound lanes was let on October 31, 2007. Four construction firms submitted bids for this $137 million contract February 6, 2008, according to bid results from CONNDOT. The contract was awarded to a joint venture between the Middlesex Company and Pittsfield, Maine-based Cianbro Corporation in April 2008.

The final contract, known as Contract B, will construct the remainder of the new bridge and demolish the existing span. Contract B was awarded to a joint venture between Walsh Construction of Chicago, Illinois, and Denver, Colorado-based PCL Constructors for $417 million in July 2009. The joint venture company is also known as Walsh-PCL Joint Venture II (A previous joint venture between the two companies, known as Walsh-PCL Joint Venture I, reconstructed the Moses Wheeler Bridge in Stratford).

==== Route 34/Downtown Crossing ====
In a related project known as Downtown Crossing, the city of New Haven has been decommissioning the Route 34/Oak Street Connector to make way for new developments, and to reconnect Downtown New Haven's street grid. The first phase of this project was included in the New Haven Harbor Crossing Improvement Program, let on February 1, 2013, and completed on July 10, 2015.

==== Canal Dock Boathouse ====
Another part of the program was the construction of the Canal Dock Boathouse. The state agreed to construct the boathouse as a compromise with the city of New Haven for demolishing the historic Yale Boathouse. The boathouse construction contract was preceded by a contract to build a platform for the boathouse to sit on. This began in February 2013 and ended in October 2014. Construction on the boathouse itself began in October 2016 and ended in September 2018.

==== West Haven to I-91/Route 34 ====
Three separate contracts reconstructed and widened I-95 from I-91/Route 34 to Route 162 in West Haven.

To the west of Long Wharf, CONNDOT replaced aging bridge over the West River and Route 10 with a wider structure through . Part of this reconstruction effort involved consolidated Exits 44 and 45 into a single interchange. Construction of the new West River Bridge occurred in a three-stage project similar to the reconstruction of the Moses Wheeler Bridge further west in Stratford. The first stage involving construction of the new northbound lanes was completed in the middle of 2015. The second stage involved shifting northbound traffic onto the new northbound span and shifting southbound traffic onto the former northbound lanes of the original bridge so the old southbound lanes could be demolished to make way for the new southbound lanes. This stage was completed in the middle of 2016, with southbound traffic shifted to the new southbound structure and the original bridge taken out of service. The final stage involves removal of the remaining original bridge and completing the center portion of the new bridge. All three stages were completed as part of a single contract, which was let on March 31, 2014, and ended on November 9, 2018. This was the final project completed under the program to date.

The section of I-95 from Route 162 in West Haven to the West River features six lanes with no shoulders, and has been the site of chronic congestion and numerous accidents. Plans for reconstructing and widening this section features full left and right-hand shoulders, and contains provisions for a future expansion to eight lanes. No timetable or funding is present for this project.
