= Mianus River Bridge =

I-95 bridge in Greenwich, CT, US

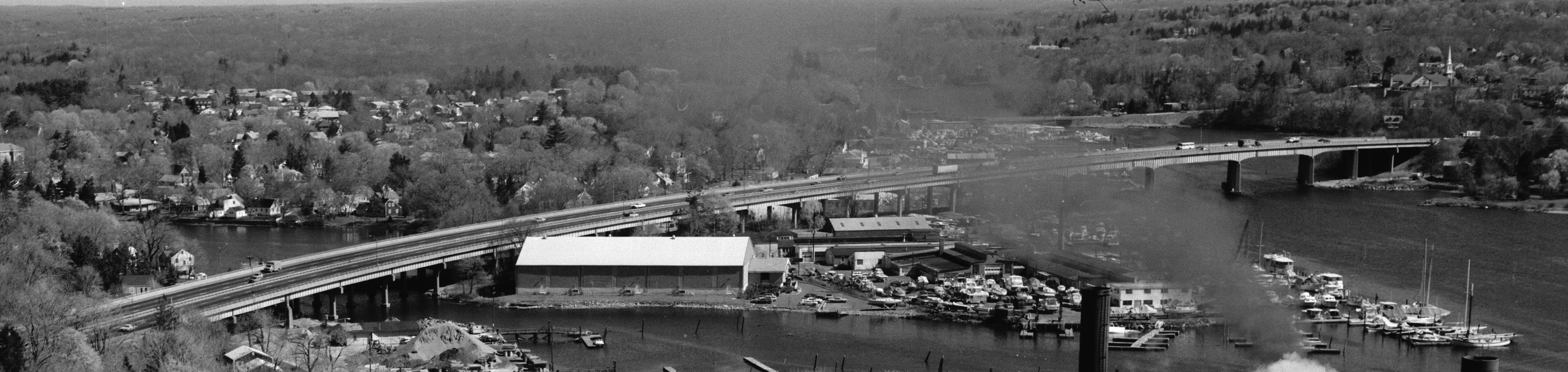
- The bridge in 1977. The 1983 collapse happened in the easternmost southern section (visible right.)
- Coordinates: 41°02′12″N 73°35′31″W
- Carried: 6 lanes of I-95
- Crossed: Mianus River
- Locale: Cos Cob and Riverside, Connecticut
- Official name: Michael L. Morano Bridge
- Maintained by: Connecticut Department of Transportation

Characteristics
- Design: Girder and floorbeam
- Clearance below: 70 feet (21 m)

History
- Construction start: 1956
- Opened: 1958
- Rebuilt: 1992
- Collapsed: 1983

Location
- Interactive map of Mianus River Bridge

The Mianus River Bridge is a span that carries Interstate 95 (Connecticut Turnpike) over the Mianus River, between Cos Cob and Riverside, Connecticut. It is the second bridge on the site. The original bridge collapsed in 1983, resulting in the deaths of three motorists. The replacement span is officially named the Michael L. Morano Bridge, after a state senator Michael L. Morano who represented Greenwich, was completed in 1992.

== Collapse ==
A 100-foot (30.5 m) section of the bridge's deck on its northbound span collapsed at 1:30 a.m. EDT on Tuesday, June 28, 1983. Three people died and three more were seriously injured when two cars and two tractor-trailers fell with the bridge into the Mianus River 70 feet (21.3 m) below. Firefighters Michael O’Connor and Ben McGorty were first on scene after calls came in to GPD Dispatch Center, which also notified Connecticut State Police, the town's marine police and the United States Coast Guard. Greenwich Police blocked off the highway as National Guard came in with helicopters. An unnamed man, traveling to Atlanta that night, stopped upon spotting the crash and brought the other cars to a stop, likely preventing more falls. Many residents were also woken up due to the sound of the collapse, which shook houses and was "like a clap of thunder".

Casualties from the collapse were few because the disaster occurred at about 1:30 a.m., when traffic was low on the often-crowded highway.

=== Causes ===
The collapse was caused by the failure of two pin and hanger assemblies that held the deck in place on the outer side of the bridge, according to an investigation by the National Transportation Safety Board. Rust formed within the bearing of the pin, exerting a force on the hanger which was beyond design limits for the retaining clamps. It forced the hanger on the inside part of the expansion joint at the southeast corner off the end of the pin that was holding it, and the load was shifted to outside hanger. The extra load on the remaining hanger started a fatigue crack at a sharp corner on the pin. When it failed catastrophically, the deck was supported at just three corners. When two heavy trucks and a car entered the section, the remaining expansion joint failed, and the deck crashed into the river below.

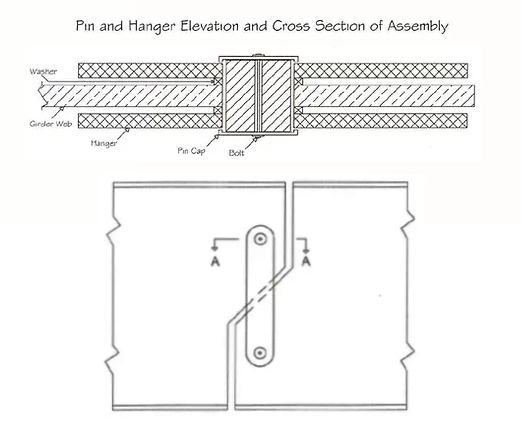
Pin and hanger assembly used on the bridge

The ensuing NTSB investigation concluded that the collapse occurred due to ″deficiencies in the State of Connecticut's bridge safety inspection and bridge maintenance program.″ They cited corrosion from water buildup due to inadequate drainage as a cause. During road mending some 10 years before, the highway drains had been deliberately blocked and the crew failed to unblock them when the road work was completed. Rainwater leaked down through the pin bearings, causing them to rust. The outer bearings were fracture-critical and non-redundant, a design flaw of this particular type of structure. The bearings were difficult to inspect close-up, although traces of rust could be seen near the affected bearings.

The incident was also blamed on inadequate inspection resources in the state of Connecticut. At the time of the disaster, the state had just 12 engineers, working in pairs, assigned to inspect 3,425 bridges. The collapse came despite the nationwide inspection procedures brought about by the collapse of the Silver Bridge in West Virginia in December 1967. The collapse also came as a surprise, considering the bridge underwent and allegedly passed a DOT inspection just nine months prior. After the collapse, one of the inspectors altered his notes, adding 20 additional notes to appear as if he had observed the problems with the bridge. He was found out because he made the additional notes with a finer pencil; due to his long record of good service, he was given one year of probation rather than fired. Also, on the weekend leading up to the collapse, residents had complained about an increase in strange noises and vibrations coming from the bridge, including what one resident described as being "like thousands of birds chirping," but no action was taken.

=== Aftermath ===
After the collapse, the almost 90,000 vehicles that used the bridge daily were diverted onto US-1 and local streets in Greenwich, causing the worst traffic problems the town had ever seen. The Town of Greenwich Health Department monitored the environmental impact, providing advice through the issuance of special bulletins to residents along the temporary routes. The interstate was not fully reopened until September, and then only with a temporary truss carrying two lanes of northbound traffic instead of the usual three. In total, final repairs cost over $20 million.

The Bridgeport & Port Jefferson Ferry, which operates out of Bridgeport roughly 25 miles (40 km) east of the bridge and which had entered a new car and passenger ferry, the MV Grand Republic, into service three months prior to the collapse, saw a surge in ridership following the collapse, as many travelers traveling between Connecticut and Long Island found the ferry an attractive alternative to the traffic congestion caused by the collapse. Following the collapse, a temporary bridge span was installed and I-95 northbound was reopened to two lanes of traffic with a posted weight limit that restricted heavy trucks from using the bridge. The bridge was fully reopened in September 1983 when permanent repairs to the span were completed.

The Mianus River Bridge was completely reconstructed in the late 1980s and early 1990s. Work included replacing all of the structural steel, rebuilding and expanding the bridge deck to accommodate a wider roadway, and repairing the bridge piers to extend their service life. The replacement span was completed in 1992 and eliminated the pin-and-hanger assemblies that caused the collapse of the original bridge. The new wider bridge also features full left- and right-hand shoulders, a feature absent from the old bridge. Many other bridges in Connecticut were also retrofitted after the collapse to prevent what happened to cause the bridge to collapse.

Governor William A. O'Neill afterward proposed a $5.5 billion transportation spending package to pay for rehabilitation and replacement of bridges and other transportation projects in Connecticut.

In 1992, the bridge was officially named the Michael L. Morano Bridge, after a state senator who represented nearby Greenwich.

== See also ==
- List of bridge failures
