= List of crossings of the Housatonic River =

There are numerous crossings of the Housatonic River, both by road and railroad bridge. The following is a list of crossings of the Housatonic River in order of occurrence from the river mouth at Long Island Sound to its principal source streams in the Berkshire Mountains.

== Connecticut ==
Bridge	Route	Location	Built	Notes	Coordinates
Washington Bridge	US 1	Stratford and Milford	1921		41°12′01″N 73°06′37″W
Moses Wheeler Bridge	I-95	Stratford and Milford	2016 (original built 1958)		41°12′17″N 73°06′34″W
Metro North railroad bridge	New Haven Line	Stratford and Milford			41°12′19″N 73°06′35″W
Sikorsky Bridge	Route 15	Stratford and Milford	2006 (original built 1940)		41°14′47″N 73°05′29″W
Commodore Hull Bridge	Route 8	Shelton and Derby	1951		41°18′51″N 73°05′11″W
Railroad bridge	CSX/Housatonic Railroad	Shelton and Derby			41°19′02″N 73°05′20″W
Derby-Shelton Bridge	SR 712	Shelton and Derby	1918	Connects Route 110 / Route 34	41°19′08″N 73°05′27″W
Stevenson Dam Bridge	Route 34	Monroe and Oxford	1919		41°22′59″N 73°10′18″W
Rochambeau Bridge	I-84 / US 6	Newtown and Southbury	1953 (rebuilt 2023); 1977 (rebuilt 2022)		41°26′20″N 73°14′52″W
Glen Road Bridge	SR 816	Newtown and Southbury	1936		41°26′12″N 73°15′55″W
Southville Bridge	Route 133	Brookfield and Bridgewater	1954		41°28′46″N 73°21′03″W
Lovers Leap Bridge		New Milford	1895	Lenticular truss bridge from East Berlin, Connecticut	41°32′39″N 73°24′25″W
Marsh Bridge	Grove Street	New Milford	1977		41°32′40″N 73°24′26″W
Railroad bridge	Housatonic Railroad	New Milford			41°33′49″N 73°24′27″W
Veterans Memorial Bridge	US 202 / Route 67	New Milford	1953		41°34′29″N 73°24′55″W
Boardman Bridge		New Milford	1984		41°35′35″N 73°27′00″W
Old Boardman Bridge		New Milford	1888	Lenticular truss bridge from East Berlin - similar design to Lover's Leap (closed to traffic)	41°35′36″N 73°27′00″W
Gaylord Bridge	US 7	New Milford	1991		41°38′50″N 73°29′02″W
Bull's Bridge		Kent	Pre-1900		41°40′32″N 73°30′34″W
Fuller Bridge	Route 341	Kent	1923 (rebuilt 1991)		41°43′36″N 73°28′52″W
Cornwall Bridge	US 7 / Route 4	Sharon and Cornwall	1930		41°49′10″N 73°22′22″W
West Cornwall Covered Bridge	Route 128	Sharon and Cornwall	1864	Historic wooden covered bridge; Sharon-Goshen Turnpike	41°52′17″N 73°21′50″W
Lime Rock Road Bridge	US 7, Appalachian Trail	Salisbury and Canaan	1931		41°56′03″N 73°21′42″W
Water Street	Appalachian Trail	Salisbury and Canaan	1903 rebuilt 1985		41°57′30″N 73°22′14″W
Dutchers Bridge	US 44	Salisbury and North Canaan	1990		42°00′17″N 73°21′27″W

== Massachusetts ==
Bridge	Route	Location	Built	Notes	Coordinates
Rannapo Road					42°03′31″N 73°20′34″W
Housatonic Railroad					42°04′10″N 73°20′25″W
	Route 7A				42°04′11″N 73°20′24″W
Green Bridge	Bridge Street	Great Barrington		Green pony truss bridge, 2 lanes	
Cottage Street Bridge (closed)	Cottage Street	Great Barrington		Rustic pony truss bridge, closed to traffic, 2 lane, abandoned	
Butternut Bridge	State Rd/Main Street	Great Barrington	Refurbished 2020/21	Two lane red pony truss bridg	
Division Street Bridge	Division Street	Vandeusenville	2022	Temporary 1-lane truss bridge, gray, to be replaced	
Park Street Bridge	Park Street	Housatonic	2017	Two-lane beam bridge	

- Rt.7: 42° 04' 29"N, 73° 20' 00"W
- Maple Avenue (Ashley Falls): 42° 06' 32"N, 73° 20' 24"W
- 7-23 (Great Barrington): 42° 12' 05"N, 73° 21' 28"W
- Rt.183: 42° 15' 15"N, 73° 21' 55"W
- Housatonic Railroad: 42° 16' 31"N, 73° 21' 35"W
- Rt.7 (Stockbridge): 42° 16' 44"N, 73° 18' 50"W
- Housatonic Railroad: 42° 16' 31"N, 73° 16' 08"W
- Rt.102: 42° 17' 34"N, 73° 14' 27"W
- I-90: 42° 17' 52"N, 73° 14' 27"W
- Housatonic Railroad: 42° 18' 20"N, 73° 15' 08"W
- Rt.20: 42° 18' 37"N, 73° 15' 16"W
- Mill Street (East Lee): 42° 19' 57"N, 73° 14' 47"W
- Housatonic Railroad: 42° 19' 59"N, 73° 14' 44"W
- Holmes Rd (Pittsfield): 42° 25' 48"N, 73° 14' 19"W

=== East branch ===
The following crossings refer to where the West branch of the Housatonic River splits, and the East branch begins:

- Appleton Ave (Pittsfield): 42° 26' 25"N, 73° 14' 54"W
- Elm St (Pittsfield): 42° 26' 42"N, 73° 14' 38"W
- East St (Pittsfield): 42° 27' 10"N, 73° 12' 21"W
- CSX Berkshire Subdivision: 42° 27' 22"N, 73° 12' 14"W
- South St (Pittsfield): 42° 28' 06"N, 73° 10' 54"W
- Rt.8 (Pittsfield): 42° 28' 27"N, 73° 09' 24"W
- Rt.8: 42° 28' 04"N, 73° 08' 32"W
- Rt.8: 42° 27' 26"N, 73° 07' 48"W
- Rt.8: 42° 26' 37"N, 73° 07' 45"W
- Rt.8: 42° 25' 34"N, 73° 06' 44"W
- Source at Muddy Pond: 42° 23' 11"N, 73° 06' 42"W

=== West branch ===
The following crossings are along the west branch of the Housatonic River:

- 7-20: 42° 26' 11"N, 73° 15' 26"W
- Southwest Branch splits
- Rt.20: 42° 26' 38"N, 73° 15' 39"W
- CSX Berkshire Subdivision: 42° 26' 49"N, 73° 15' 50"W
- West St (Pittsfield): 42° 26' 59"N, 73° 15' 48"W
- Pontoosuc Ave (Pittsfield): 42° 27' 59"N, 73° 15' 06"W
- Hancock Rd: 42° 29' 02"N, 73° 14' 47"W
- Source at Pontoosuc Lake: 42° 29' 43"N, 73° 14' 51"W

=== Southwest branch ===
The following list contains Housatonic River crossings along its southwest branch:

- Housatonic Railroad: 42° 26' 22"N, 73° 16' 02"W
- Rt.20: 42° 26' 23"N, 73° 17' 38"W
- Rt.20: 42° 26' 18"N, 73° 18' 08"W
- Source at Richmond Pond: 42° 24' 51"N, 73° 19' 28"W
