= Pin and hanger assembly =

Assembly used to connect two plate girders of a bridge

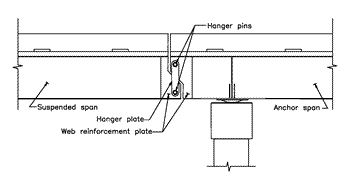
Pin and hanger assembly

A pin and hanger assembly is used to connect two plate girders of a bridge. These assemblies are used to provide an expansion joint in the bridge. One beam (the anchor span) is set on a pier with a short section cantilevered out toward the next pier. The other (the suspended span) begins underneath the anchor span, and has its far end resting on the next pier. The beams have holes directly above each other. The two holes are connected using hangers, a pair of connecting plates sandwiching the bridge girders. A pair of large steel pins through the plates and girder webbing provide the hinges, holding up the suspended span while allowing it to move longitudinally. Large washers are bolted to each end of the pin to retain the hangers. Exceptionally long spans may have two sets of girders cantilevered from opposite bridge piers with a third set of girders suspended by pin and hanger assemblies from both cantilevers. This was the case for the original Mianus River Bridge in Connecticut.

== Safety concerns ==
Pin and hanger assemblies are considered fracture critical bridge components, meaning that the assemblies are non-redundant and failure of these systems could cause part or all of the bridge to collapse. The collapse of the Mianus River Bridge in Connecticut exposed potential flaws with pin and hanger bridges that could lead to catastrophic failures, if left unchecked. Because of this, state departments of transportation incur costly expenses on bridges with pin and hanger assemblies, as they require constant inspection and maintenance. As a result of these safety concerns, and advances in bridge design to allow longer spans, pin and hanger assemblies are no longer used on new bridges in the United States.

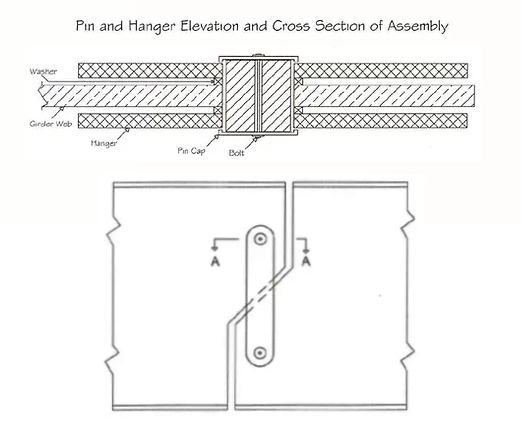
Pin and hanger assembly for a bridge

== Retrofitting ==
Attempts have been made to increase the safety of bridges with pin and hanger assemblies by adding some form of redundancy to the assembly. Retrofits that add redundancy to pin and hanger assemblies include adding a "catcher's mitt"‍—‌a short steel beam attached to the bottom of the cantilevered girder that extends out beneath the suspended girder to "catch" the suspended girder should the pin and hanger assembly fail. Another redundancy is connecting the cantilevered and suspended girders at the pin and hanger assembly with welded blocks and tie rods. Replacement options include bolted splices (gusset plates) plus shear connectors; a link slab; a ship-lap joint; and a new pin and hanger assembly with improved materials.
