= Fowler Island =

Island in Connecticut, United States

Coordinates: 41.2370°N 73.1203°W

Fowler Island is the sole island owned by Milford, Connecticut, north of I-95 in the Housatonic River. The island is north of the Moses Wheeler Bridge, and south of the Igor I. Sikorsky Memorial Bridge. The island is uninhabited except for occasional visits by anglers, bird watchers and duck hunters; all transportation to the island is by boat.

The island's maximum elevation is approximately 7 feet (2.1 m). The mercury content was evaluated in 2003 at ~300 to 5000 ppb.

From 2011 the island was part of a multi-year wetland restoration report by the U.S. Fish & Wildlife Service, NOAA, and the Connecticut Department of Energy and Environmental Protection. The project goal was to eradicate an invasive species of plant known as Phragmites.
