= Jesus nut =

Slang term for the main rotor-retaining nut of some helicopters

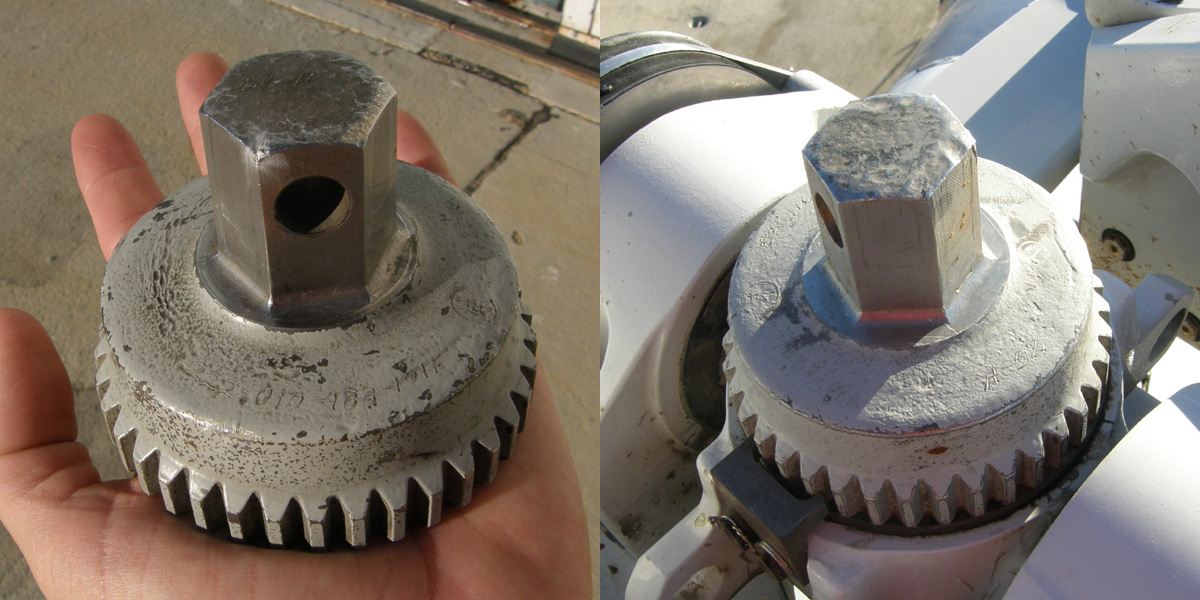
The Main rotor attach nut, or "Jesus nut", from a Bell 222U, shown in hand for size perspective (left) and installed with locking key (right)

The main rotor retaining nut or mast nut, often colloquially referred to as the Jesus nut, holds the main rotor to the mast of some helicopters. The related slang term Jesus pin refers to the lock pin used to secure the retaining nut. A failure of this nut is likely to result in a crash. More generally, Jesus nut (or Jesus pin) is used to refer to any component that is a single point of failure and whose breakdown would result in catastrophic consequences, the suggestion being that in such case the only thing left to do would be to "pray to Jesus."

== Origin of name ==
The term Jesus nut may have been coined by American soldiers in Vietnam; the Vietnam War was the first war to feature large numbers of soldiers riding in helicopters. The term may also have originated with the PBY Catalina, which had two Jesus bolts holding the wing onto the fuselage.

If the main rotor retaining nut were to fail in flight, the rotor would detach from the helicopter, hence the idea that all that would then be left for the crew to do would be to "pray to Jesus." The nut/pin must be checked before the flight, even though real-world examples of the Jesus nut/pin failing are rare. For example, in 2000, the mast nut of a Bell 206B was removed to be repainted and was not restored and checked prior to a test flight. The helicopter crashed within ten minutes of takeoff, killing the two occupants.

== Other contexts ==
More recently, the term has been more generically applied throughout engineering to include any single component whose failure would cause catastrophic failure of the entire system.

Another use for the term is found in rock climbing, in which it refers to the first piece of protection (some of which are also called "nuts") placed on a pitch. This piece must be placed to resist an outward pull as well as a downward pull in order to avoid the possibility of a "zipper", in which the outward pull on the rope from the belayer arresting a falling climber pulls protection pieces from the bottom up. In addition, the Jesus nut prevents the possibility of a factor-two fall onto the belay anchor.

In literature, the term "Jesus nut" first appeared in print in Elaine Shepard's 1967 book The Doom Pussy, a recollection of her experiences with aviators in the early part of the Vietnam War. It was later popularized in Chickenhawk by Robert Mason, a narrative about his experiences as a pilot in the war.

== See also ==
- Circlip, also known as a "Jesus clip"
- Linchpin
