= Moses Wheeler Bridge =

Bridge in Connecticut, United States

- Coordinates: 41°12′17″N 73°06′34″W
- Carries: 6 lanes of I-95
- Crosses: Housatonic River
- Locale: Stratford, Connecticut/Milford, Connecticut
- Official name: Moses Wheeler Bridge
- Maintained by: Connecticut Department of Transportation

Characteristics
- Design: Continuous steel plate girder and floorbeam
- Total length: 967 meters (3,196 feet)
- No. of spans: 14

History
- Opened: 1958 (Reconstructed 2011-2016)

Location
- Interactive map of Moses Wheeler Bridge

Moses Wheeler Bridge carries Interstate 95 (Connecticut Turnpike) over the Housatonic River between Stratford and the Devon section of Milford. The current bridge is a 14-span continuous girder and floorbeam structure that carries three (expandable to four) lanes of traffic in each direction, with full inside and outside shoulders. The current bridge, completed in 2016, replaces a pre-existing structure that was completed as part of the original Connecticut Turnpike in 1958. The original bridge was a 34-span plate girder structure with a concrete deck with three 12-foot travel lanes in each direction and no shoulders. The central span of the original bridge over the river's navigation channel included a pin and hanger assembly, which are no longer used in bridge construction in the United States. Construction on the Moses Wheeler Bridge began in 1955 and opened on January 2, 1958.

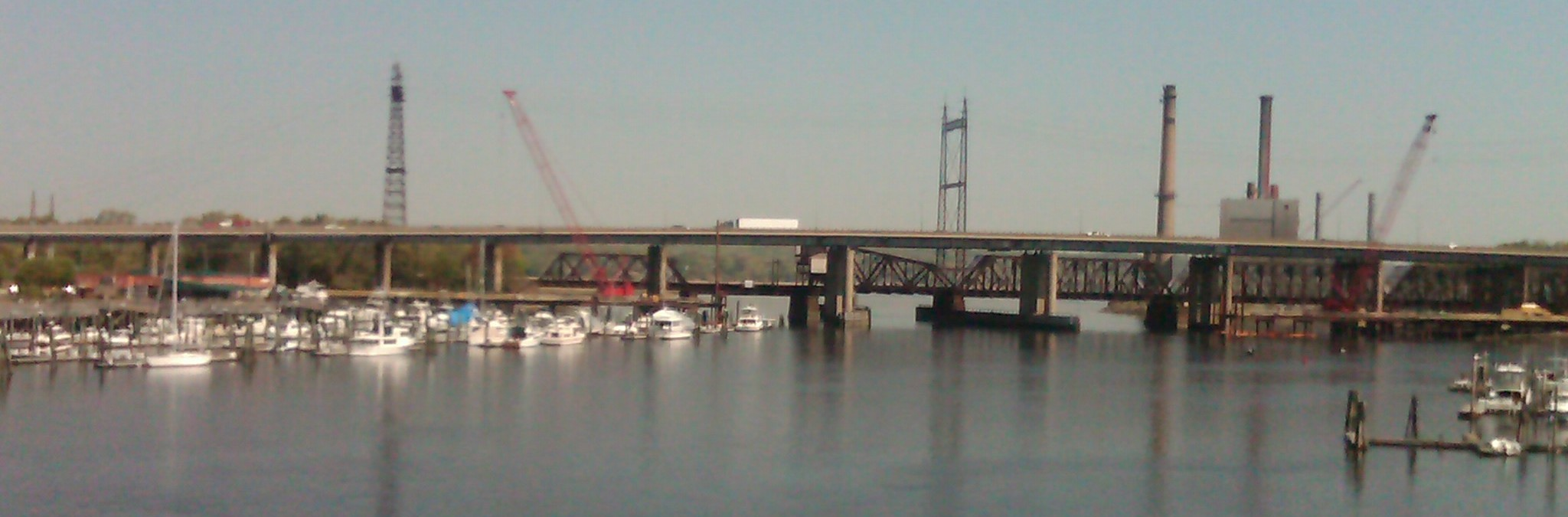
The original Moses Wheeler Bridge, as seen from Washington Bridge, in 2010. Cranes can be seen assembling piers and abutments for the new bridge

== Replacement Bridge ==
Heavy traffic and harsh New England weather had taken their toll on the original Moses Wheeler Bridge. It had been rated as 'structurally deficient' during recent inspections, with accelerating deterioration of the structural steel and the fracture critical pin and hanger assemblies being of particular concern; the latter problem gained increased attention due to the collapse of the similar-in-design Mianus River Bridge further west in Greenwich in 1983. The Connecticut Department of Transportation (CTDOT) began drawing up plans to replace the bridge in 1996. Originally CTDOT planned to construct the new bridge to the south of the existing one, away from 115 kilovolt high tension wires that run atop the nearby Housatonic River Railroad Bridge. Stratford residents and officials demanded the new bridge be built to the north of the existing span, closer to the Metro-North bridge and the power lines. A compromise was reached where the new bridge will use approximately the same alignment as the original one. To make this possible, the new bridge was built substantially wider than the old one, which will also allow a future expansion with restriping of the travel lanes. The project was completed in three stages: the first two stages consisted of constructing the outer parts of the new bridge that carry the two outer lanes and the outer shoulder, while three lanes of traffic were maintained on the existing bridge. During the final stage of construction, three lanes of traffic were shifted to the new outer spans, to allow crews to demolish the original span and complete the center portion of the new bridge.

The new bridge, like the original one, accommodates six lanes of traffic, but has full left and right shoulders which the original bridge did not have. In addition, the left shoulders were built wide enough to accommodate a future widening to eight lanes. Two design options were developed for the new 14-span structure: one option using segmented concrete hollow box girders, and the other using continuous steel plate girders. The bridge is designed for seismic loading to withstand a major earthquake. Additionally, it includes a fender system to protect the bridge piers from ship collisions. Aesthetic features are also included, among which is encasing the bridge piers with decorative granite and aesthetic lighting. The STV Group designed the replacement bridge.

Environmental studies for the new bridge were completed in 2005, and CTDOT awarded a $60 million contract to Torrington, Connecticut-based O&G Industries for the initial phase of work in July 2009. Construction on the first phase of replacing the bridge, including the foundations for the new bridge piers and temporary work trusses in the Housatonic River began in September 2009. The $166.5 million contract to build the remainder of the new bridge and demolish the existing span was awarded to a joint venture between Chicago, Illinois-based Walsh Construction Company and Denver, Colorado-based PCL Constructors (also referred to in contract documents as Walsh/PCL Joint Venture II) in August 2011. Walsh/PCL opted to use the steel plate girder design option.

Walsh/PCL commenced work to widen I-95 on the east and west approaches and began erecting the bridge piers for the new Moses Wheeler Bridge in September 2011. Crews shifted I-95 traffic to the southern half of the roadway so the northern half of the highway, including several smaller overpasses could rebuilt and expanded. On January 17, 2013, southbound traffic was shifted onto the completed northern third of the new bridge and approaches. Northbound traffic was shifted onto the former southbound lanes of the old bridge on January 26, 2013. The Walsh/PCL construction team began demolishing the northbound portion of the old bridge and approaches in February 2013. Demolition of the old northbound span was completed in May 2013, and crews began erecting structural steel for the new northbound lanes in June 2013. In December 2013, northbound traffic was shifted from the old bridge to the new northbound lanes, at which point the remainder of the original 1958 structure was taken out of service and removed. During the summer of 2014, three large gantry cranes were assembled in the median of I-95 to facilitate the removal of structural steel from the original span and construction of the center portion of the new span. By the end of 2015, construction of the new Moses Wheeler Bridge reached substantial completion, with final paving and striping completed in spring 2016.

== Emergency repairs ==
During the summer of 2007, CONNDOT performed a $6.9 million emergency repair project to the Moses Wheeler Bridge after several large holes opened up in the bridge deck, and advanced deterioration of the structural steel was discovered during a routine inspection. The project involved a full-depth patch and repair of the bridge deck, roadway resurfacing, and reinforcement of key superstructure components to ensure the bridge could remain in service until the new bridge can be built.

== See also ==
- List of crossings of the Housatonic River
