= Igor I. Sikorsky Memorial Bridge =

Sikorsky Memorial Bridge
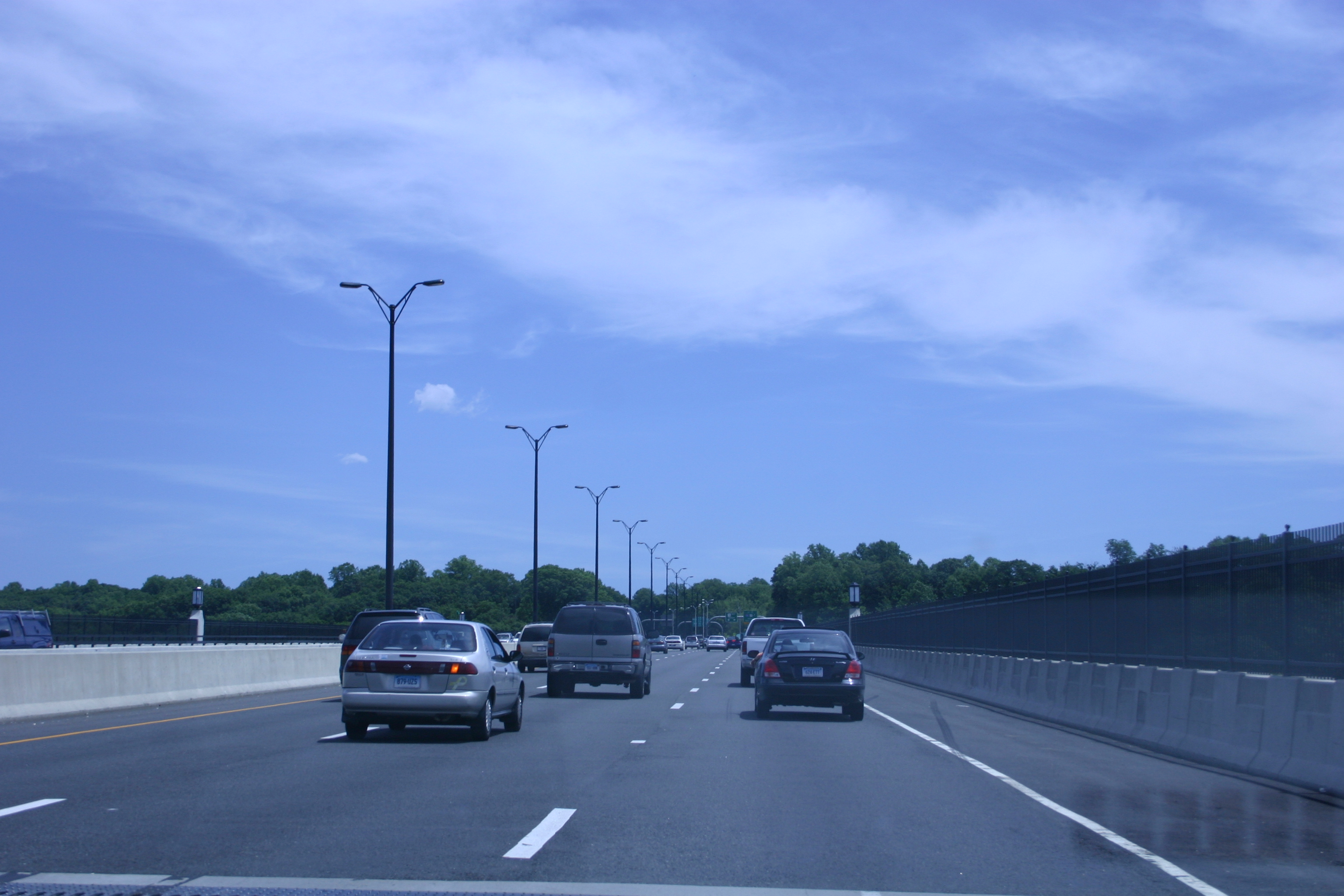
- Traveling eastbound (toward Milford) on the Igor I. Sikorsky Memorial Bridge in June 2007.
- Coordinates: 41°14′47″N 73°05′29″W
- Carries: 6 lanes of the Merritt Parkway (Route 15)
- Crosses: Housatonic River
- Locale: Between Stratford and Milford, Connecticut
- Official name: Igor Sikorsky Memorial Bridge
- Maintained by: Connecticut Department of Transportation

Characteristics
- Design: steel continuous stringer/multi-beam
- Total length: 1,800 ft (548.6 m)
- Width: 53 ft (16.2 m)
- Clearance below: 85 ft (25.9 m)

History
- Opened: 1940 (original span) reconstructed 2000-2006

Statistics
- Daily traffic: 79,700
- Toll: (Until 1988) $0.35

Location
- Interactive map of Sikorsky Memorial Bridge

The Igor I. Sikorsky Memorial Bridge (also known as the Sikorsky Memorial Bridge, and as the Housatonic River Bridge) carries the controlled-access Merritt Parkway (Connecticut Route 15) over the Housatonic River, between Stratford and Milford, Connecticut.

The first bridge on the site, known as the Sikorsky Bridge, was completed in 1940, marking the completion of the Merritt Parkway and the starting point for construction of the adjoining Wilbur Cross Parkway, September 2, 1940. It featured two lanes in each direction, and open steel grid decking that saved cost to stay within budget and was unpopular with drivers. A toll plaza stood at the eastern end of the Sikorsky Bridge until Connecticut abolished tolls in 1988, and is now preserved in Stratford at the Boothe Memorial Park and Museum.

The Sikorsky Bridge was named after aviation pioneer Igor Sikorsky, whose helicopter factory remains located north of the roadway, along the western riverfront, immediately north of the approach to the bridge - which in the 21st century operates as a component of Lockheed Martin Corporation.

After years of environmental studies, the Connecticut Department of Transportation awarded an $87 million contract to Balfour Beatty Construction to build the replacement bridge, the Igor I. Sikorsky Memorial Bridge, in 2000. The southern half of the Igor I. Sikorsky Memorial Bridge opened in 2003; the Sikorsky Bridge was demolished in 2004. In February 2004, the load unexpectedly shifted on a crane that was removing structural steel from the old bridge. The crane overturned and fell into the partially frozen Housatonic River, killing its operator.

The remaining half of the Igor I. Sikorsky Memorial Bridge was completed in 2006, two years behind schedule. The new bridge has a concrete deck, with an asphalt surface, three lanes in each direction, full left and right shoulders, a sidewalk for pedestrians, wrought-iron railing, and aesthetic lighting. The bridge also includes a system of concrete fenders that protects the bridge piers from ship collisions, a feature that was absent from the 1940 span.

In 2006, the new bridge was formally dedicated as the Igor I. Sikorsky Memorial Bridge.

== See also ==
- List of bridges documented by the Historic American Engineering Record in Connecticut
- List of crossings of the Housatonic River
- Sikorsky Memorial Airport
