= Sanford House =

Sanford House may refer to:

in the United States (by state then city)

- Sanford House (Sioux City, Iowa), listed on the NRHP in Woodbury County
- Sanford House (Syracuse, New York), listed on the NRHP in Onondaga County
- Sanford House (Queensbury, New York), listed on the NRHP in Warren County
- White–Turner–Sanford House, Huntsville, Alabama, listed on the National Register of Historic Places (NRHP)
- Frederick S. Sanford House, Bridgewater, Connecticut, listed on the NRHP in Litchfield County, Connecticut
- Sanford–Curtis–Thurber House, Newtown, Connecticut, listed on the NRHP in Fairfield County
- Sanford-Humphreys House, Seymour, Connecticut, listed on the NRHP in New Haven County, Connecticut
- George L. Sanford House, Carson City, Nevada, listed on the NRHP
- Esbon Sanford House, North Kingstown, Rhode Island, listed on the NRHP in Washington County
