= Sedgwick House =

Sedgwick House may refer to:

in the United Kingdom

- Sedgwick House, Cumbria, built 1868

in the United States

- Maj. Gen. John Sedgwick House, Cornwall, Connecticut, listed on the National Register of Historic Places
- Sedgwick House (Bath, New York), built 1840–1854, listed on the National Register of Historic Places
