= John C. Coffing House =

Historic house in Connecticut, United States

- U.S. National Register of Historic Places
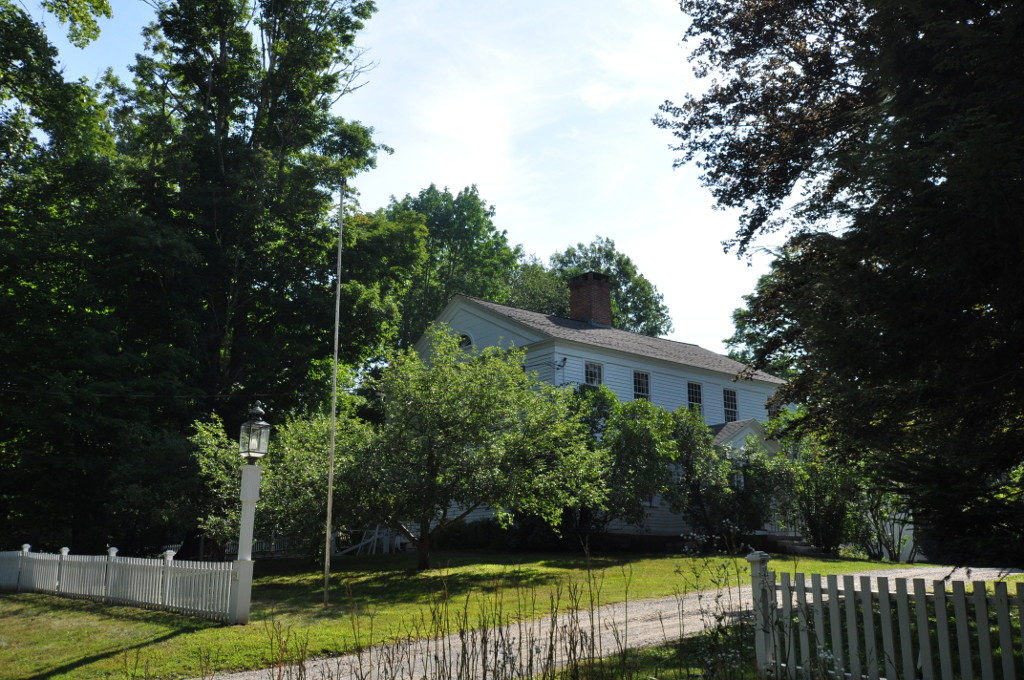

- Location within Connecticut Location within the United States
- Location: US 44 West of Salmon Kill Road, Salisbury, Connecticut
- Coordinates: 41°58′38″N 73°25′34″W
- Area: 2.5 acres (1.0 ha)
- Architectural style: Colonial, Federal, Postmedieval English
- NRHP reference No.: 90001922
- Added to NRHP: December 18, 1990

The John C. Coffing House is a historic house on United States Route 44 in Salisbury, Connecticut. Built in 1799 for one of the leading businessmen of the region, it is a good local example of late Colonial architecture. It was listed on the National Register of Historic Places in 1990.

== Description and history ==
The John C. Coffing House is located on the east side of Route 44, south of the village center of Salisbury, on 2.5 acres (1.0 ha) overlooking a tributary of Factory Brook just to the south. It is a 2 1/2-story wood-frame structure, oriented facing south toward the brook. It has a five-bay front facade, a side-gable roof with central chimney, a clapboarded exterior, and a locally quarried limestone foundation. The main entrance is at the center of the facade, sheltered by a projecting gabled vestibule added in the early 20th century. The cornices are trimmed with dentil moulding, and there is a half-round fanlight in the street-facing gable end. A wing extends to the right of the main block, apparently incorporating an older ell.

The house was built in 1799 for John C. Coffing, a native of Southbury, Connecticut. He cofounded the firm of Holley and Coffing, which became of the regions major operators of iron furnaces in the first half of the 19th century. This house was built on land Coffing purchased from Sarah Holley, which she had inherited from her grandfather Benjamin Stiles, one of the area's early settlers. The Holley and Coffing families, which intermarried in subsequent generations, dominated the area's iron production industries for several generations. This house was sold out of the extended Coffing family in 1979.

== See also ==
- National Register of Historic Places listings in Litchfield County, Connecticut
