= Terryville Waterwheel =

- U.S. National Register of Historic Places
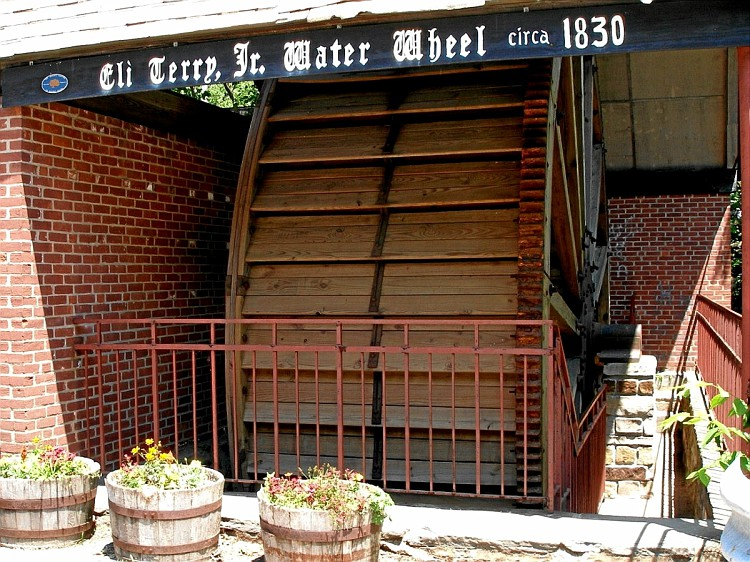

- Location within Connecticut Location within the United States
- Location: 262 Main Street, Plymouth, Connecticut
- Coordinates: 41°40′48″N 73°0′55″W
- Area: 0.1 acres (400 m^{2})
- Built: 1851
- Architectural style: high breast wheel
- NRHP reference No.: 01001412
- Added to NRHP: January 4, 2002

The Terryville Waterwheel is a historic industrial water wheel at the Pequabuck River and Main Street in the Terryville section of Plymouth, Connecticut. Probably built in 1851 for a local clockmaker, it is one of three surviving 19th-century water wheels in the state. It was listed on the National Register of Historic Places listings in 2002.

== Description and history ==
The Terryville Waterwheel is located in Terryville, a historic 19th-century manufacturing district of eastern Plymouth, and now the town's main commercial center. It is located on the north side of Main Street (United States Route 6) on a tributary of the Pequabuck River. The wheel is built out of wood and iron, and is mounted in its original wheel well formed out of rubblestone capped in concrete. It is 22 feet (6.7 m) in diameter and 7 feet (2.1 m) wide, and is sheltered by a form-fit shelter erected in 1951. Most of the wheel's parts are pressure-treated wood, replacing original materials in a 1990-91 restoration. The axle of the wheel is cast iron, with a cast iron hub providing attachment mortises for the wheel's arms. The arms are fastened to the hub with metal bolts, and are cross braced with iron tie rods.

The wheel was traditionally thought to date to the construction of Eli Terry's clock factory, which was built on this site in 1824. However, that factory was destroyed by fire in 1851, and was rebuilt by its then-owner, the Lewis Lock Company. It is believed that the present wheel fittings date to that period. The wheel was powered by water delivered from a dam upriver (no longer extant) via a wooden head race (also not extant, although it survived until 1951). This wheel provided power to lockmaking concerns until about 1940, when the factory was demolished. Of Connecticut's three surviving 19th-century water wheels it is the best preserved.

== See also ==
- National Register of Historic Places listings in Litchfield County, Connecticut
