= Holabird House =

Historic house in Connecticut, United States

- U.S. National Register of Historic Places
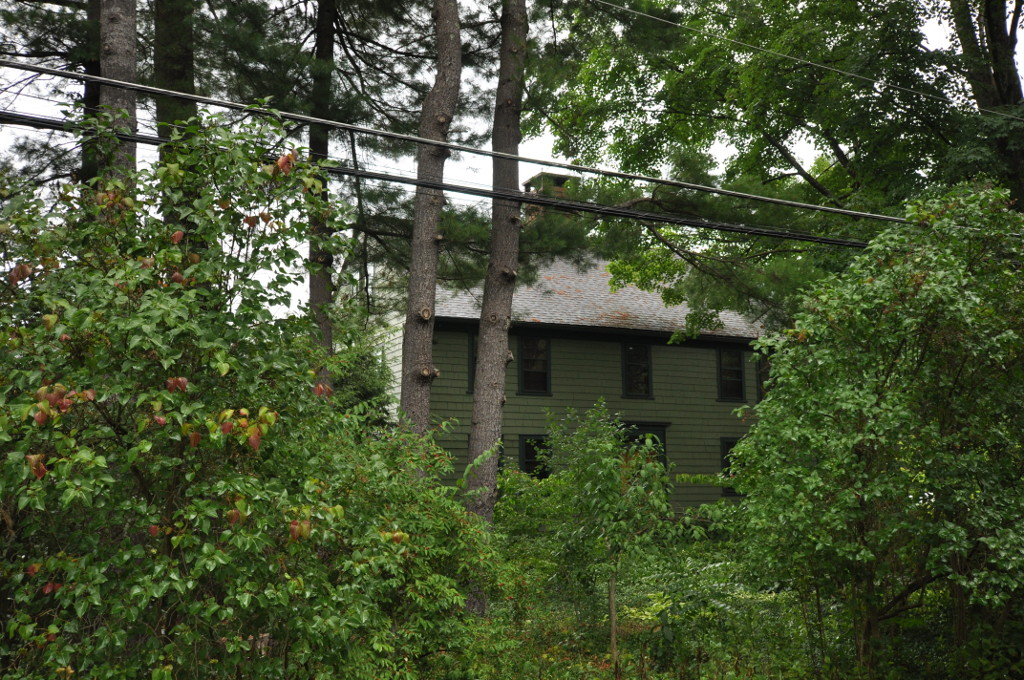

- Location within Connecticut Location within the United States
- Location: Kellog Road, corner of Route 126, Canaan, Connecticut
- Coordinates: 41°57′14″N 73°20′48″W
- Area: 19.75 acres (7.99 ha)
- Built: 1740
- Built by: Holabird, Timothy
- NRHP reference No.: 82004445
- Added to NRHP: June 28, 1982

The Holabird House is a historic house on Kellog Road in Canaan, Connecticut. Built about 1740, it is one of the town's oldest surviving buildings, and a well-preserved example of Georgian architecture. It was listed on the National Register of Historic Places in 1982.

== Description and history ==
The Holabird House stands in a rural area of central western Canaan, on the northeast side of Kellog Road just north of its junction with Connecticut Route 126. It is a 2 1/2-story wood-frame structure, with a side-gable roof, central chimney and clapboarded exterior. Its main facade is five bays wide, with symmetrical but uneven placement of the windows. The main entrance is at the center, framed by plain boards and a transom window; it is a replacement. A single-story wing of early construction extends to the rear. The interior follows a central chimney plan, with a narrow entrance vestibule that also as a winding staircase, and chambers on either side of the chimney. The original kitchen space extends behind the chimney. The downstairs and front rooms retain many original finish features; the rear rooms of the second floor have been modernized.

The oldest portion of the house, probably a three-bay section, was built about 1740 by Timothy Holabird, one of Canaan's earliest settlers. The town was not organized until 1740, and Holabird is documented to have purchased this land in 1737. There is architectural evidence suggesting that both the south side of the house and the rear section housing the kitchen are later additions, although still in the colonial period. The building's interior is markedly more elaborate than its exterior. The house is the subject of a documentary book written about 1920 by the Colonial Dames.

== See also ==
- National Register of Historic Places listings in Litchfield County, Connecticut
