= Skee's Diner =

- U.S. National Register of Historic Places
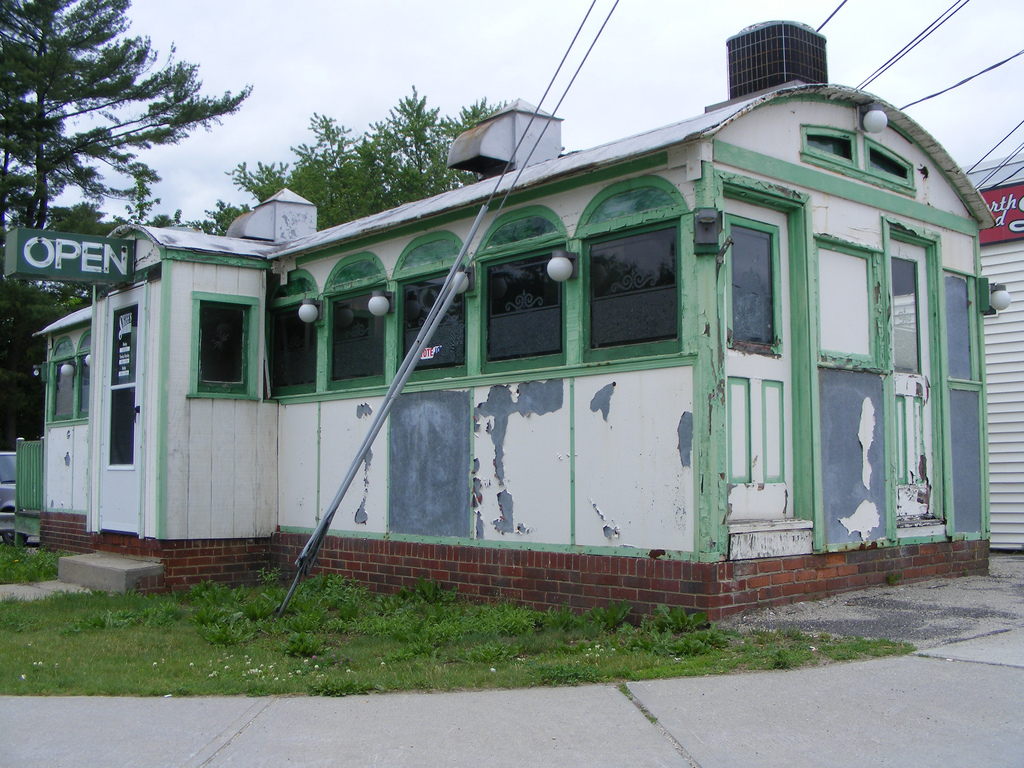
- Location: Currently unknown, likely in or near Torrington, Connecticut
- Area: less than one acre
- Built: 1944
- Architect: Jerry O'Mahony, Inc.
- Architectural style: Diner
- NRHP reference No.: 02000912
- Added to NRHP: September 06, 2002

Skee's Diner, also known for a time as Jude's Place, is a historic diner in Torrington, Connecticut. Located for many years at Main and Elm Streets, it was probably built in 1920 by the Jerry O'Mahony Diner Company, and is believed to be the oldest diner of that company in the state. It was listed on the National Register of Historic Places in 2002. In 2013, it was removed from its site by the Torrington Historic Preservation Trust for restoration, and eventual relocation to another site.

== Description and history ==
Skee's Diner is a barrel-roofed diner 11 feet (3.4 m) wide and 30 feet (9.1 m) long, framed out of metal and wood. It has entrances at the ends, and in a projecting barrel-roofed vestibule at the center of the long front. Bands of single-sash windows extend across the rest of the front, topped by decorate segmental arch panels. The roof is formed out of tongue-and-groove boards and covered in rolled asphalt. The interior's original finishes include ceramic tile (black and green), and a long tan marble counter with seventeen stools and builtin display cases.

By its design, it is estimated to have been manufactured around 1920 by the Jerry O'Mahony Diner Company of Elizabeth, New Jersey, a major manufacturer of diners between the 1910s and 1955. Originally located in Old Saybrook, it was purchased by three men and moved to Torrington in 1944, escaping a war-time moratorium on new construction. It is believed to be the oldest O'Mahony diner in the state. It was at first named Rudy's, after one of the three owners, and was placed on land rented from the adjacent Church of St. Maron. It was soon acquired by Tony Cisnowski, whose nickname "Skee" was applied to the establishment, and his brother Edmund. They operated the diner until 1975, when they sold it to Judith Belmonte. She operated it under the Skee's name and as "Jude's Place". The diner was eventually purchased by the church, which rented it out to other operators. It was permanently closed in 2002.

After standing vacant for some years, it was acquired by the Torrington Historic Preservation Trust. In April 2013, the structure was moved from its Main Street location, with the intention that it will be restored and reopened in a different location.

== See also ==
- National Register of Historic Places listings in Litchfield County, Connecticut
