= Lakeville Historic District =

Historic district in Connecticut, United States

- U.S. National Register of Historic Places
- U.S. Historic district
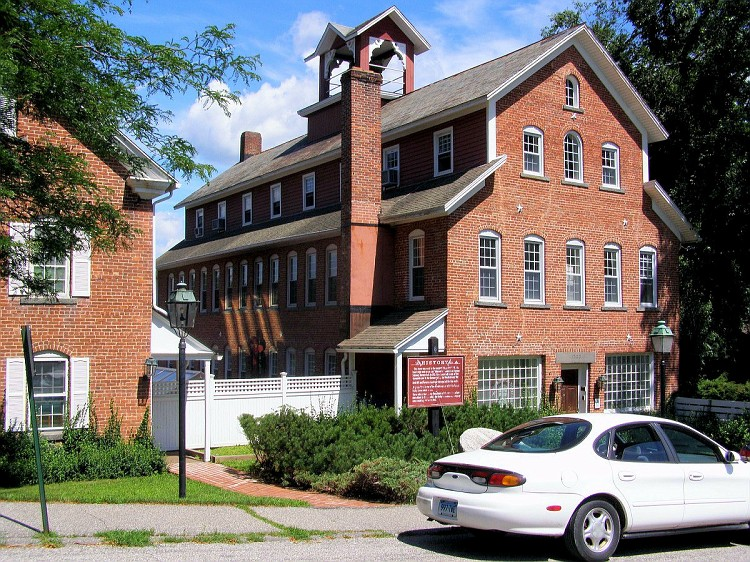
- Former Holley Company premises

- Location within Connecticut Location within the United States
- Location: Bounded by Millerton Road, Sharon Road, Allen Street, and Holley Street, Salisbury, Connecticut
- Coordinates: 41°57′51″N 73°26′31″W
- Area: 10 acres (4.0 ha)
- Built: 1748
- Architectural style: Colonial Revival, Italianate, Federal
- NRHP reference No.: 96000845
- Added to NRHP: August 1, 1996

The Lakeville Historic District in Salisbury, Connecticut is a historic district that was listed on the National Register of Historic Places in 1996. It is also the name of a local historic district that was established in 1970. The local historic district is entirely included within the National Register-listed district.

The district represents about 10 acres (4.0 ha) of the village center of Lakeville, Connecticut where the street grid remains virtually unchanged from the late 19th century. The district is defined to include properties and sites that contributed to the historical development of the village. It is noted that the district area "is surrounded by a much larger area containing many additional historic industrial, commercial, residential, religious, and recreational sites and structures."

At listing, it included 19 contributing buildings, 3 noncontributing buildings and three contributing sites on a 10-acre (4.0 ha) area. Of the 22 buildings, 13 are houses, stores, industrial buildings or other primary buildings; 9 are barns or garages or other secondary structures. The three sites are two parks, Furnace Park and Bicentennial Park, and a millpond associated with Holley Manufacturing Company.

Several Holley Manufacturing Company buildings are included. The district includes the Holley Manufacturing Company building at 7 Holley Street, c.1870, the Holley Manufacturing Company building at 8 Holley Street, 1866, and the Holley Manufacturing Company mill pond.

The railroad arrived in Lakeville in 1871, and is represented in the district by the Lakeville Station, c.1871.

The Holley-Williams House, built 1768, is an "imposing" Federal-style house. Nearby are the Farnam Tavern, from 1759, and the John Hubbard House, from c.1830 (see accompanying photo #2).

== See also ==
- National Register of Historic Places listings in Litchfield County, Connecticut
