= Migeon Avenue Historic District =

Historic district in Connecticut, United States

- U.S. National Register of Historic Places
- U.S. Historic district
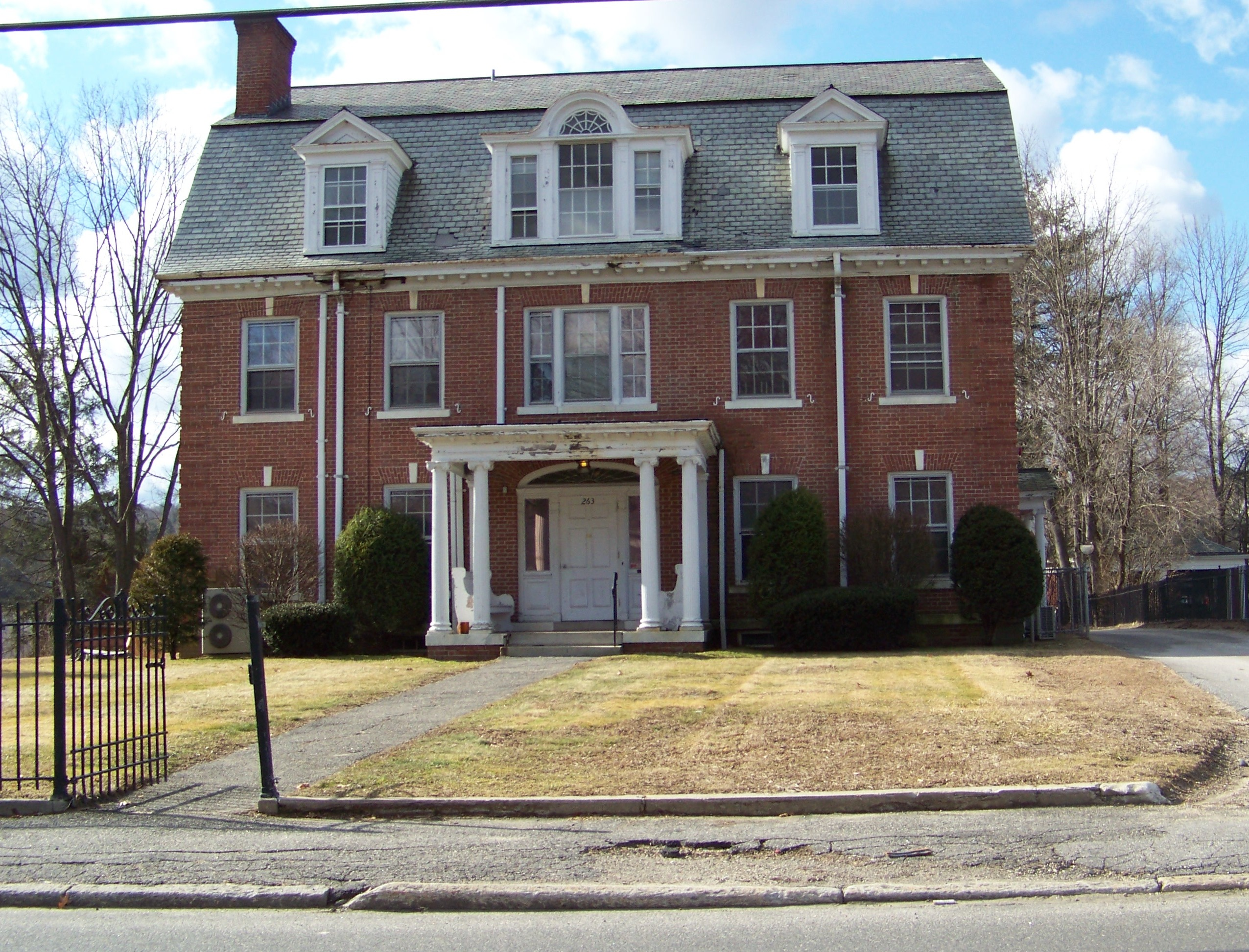
- Pease House, in 2010

- Location within Connecticut Location within the United States
- Location: Roughly along Migeon Avenue and part of Forest Street, Torrington, Connecticut
- Coordinates: 41°48′30″N 73°7′46″W
- Area: 13 acres (5.3 ha)
- Architect: Frederick Law Olmsted Jr.
- Architectural style: Shingle Style, Colonial Revival
- NRHP reference No.: 02000913
- Added to NRHP: September 6, 2002

The Migeon Avenue Historic District encompasses a group of elegant residential properties on a one-block stretch of Migeon Avenue in Torrington, Connecticut. Consisting of five properties and four contributing primary buildings, this area was home to some of Torrington's leading businessmen at the turn of the 20th century. The houses are of high architectural quality, and original landscaping was done by the Olmsted Brothers landscape design firm. The district was listed on the National Register of Historic Places in 2002.

== Description and history ==
The Migeon Avenue Historic District is located northwest of downtown Torrington. It consists of two properties on the east side of Migeon Avenue between Gleason and Forest Streets, one just north of Forest Street, and another two on the west side opposite Forest Road. The three properties on the east side are characterized by their landscaping and setback of the main building, except for the northernmost, where the original main house has been torn down and replaced by a modern assisted living facility. The two properties on the west side are on smaller lots and set closer to the road.

The largest of the properties, Laurelhurst, was first acquired and developed as his residence by Henry Migeon, a textile manufacturer. Migeon's son Achille had the present large Shingle-style house built in the late 1890s, and retained the Olmsted Brothers to landscape the property. Achille sold the parcel just north of Laurelhurst to Thomas Bryant, who built a Colonial Revival house and also hired the Olmsted Brothers to do landscaping. The Bryant house was demolished in 1966 to make way for the nursing home. The parcel south of Laurelhurst was sold by Achille to Luther Turner, who also built a large Shingle-style house. The two houses on the west side of Migeon Avenue are elegant Colonial Revival houses, built by Harlow Pease, a local builder, and Frank Travis, president of the local water and electric companies.

== Gallery ==
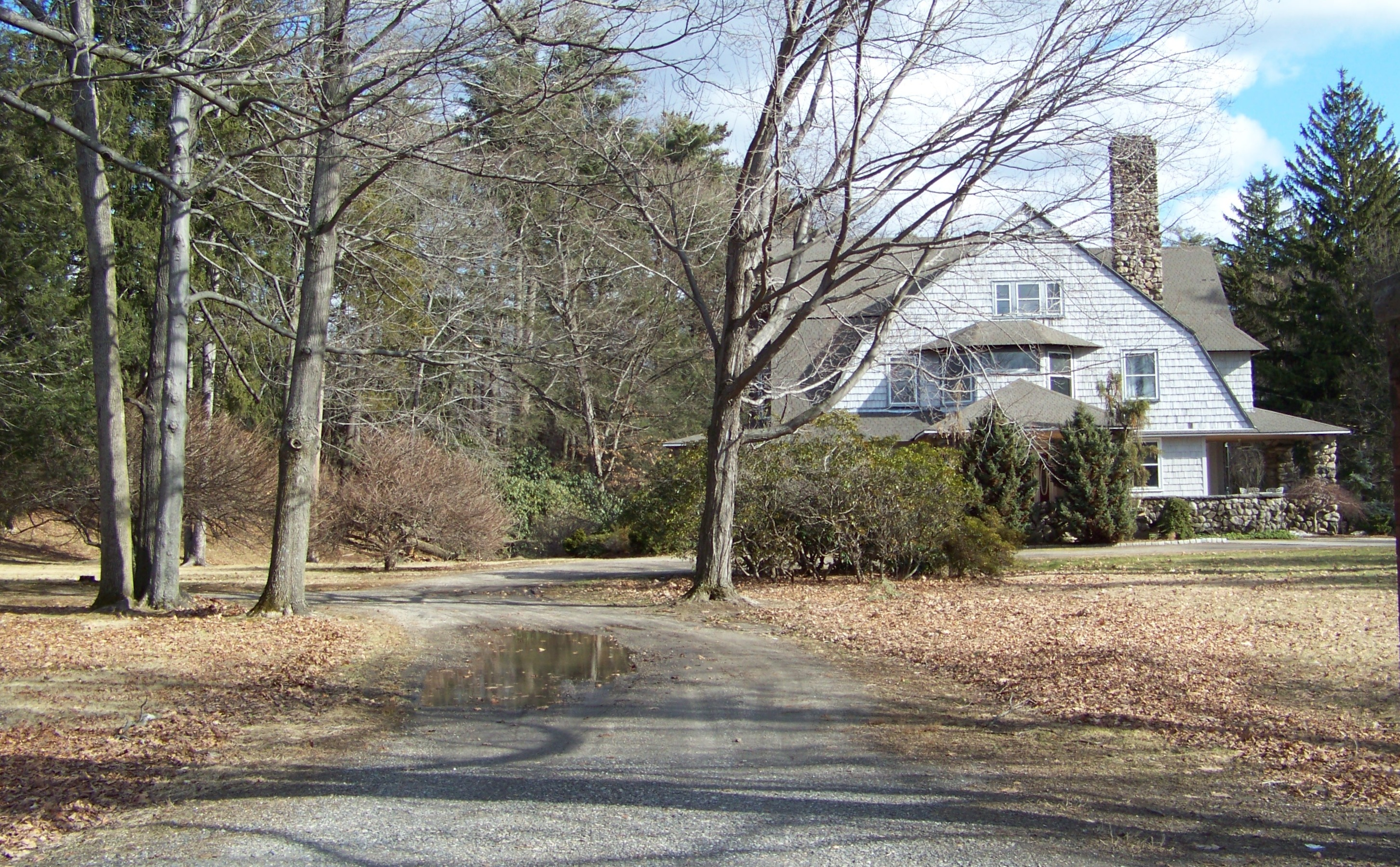
Laurelhurst, from the side, in 2010

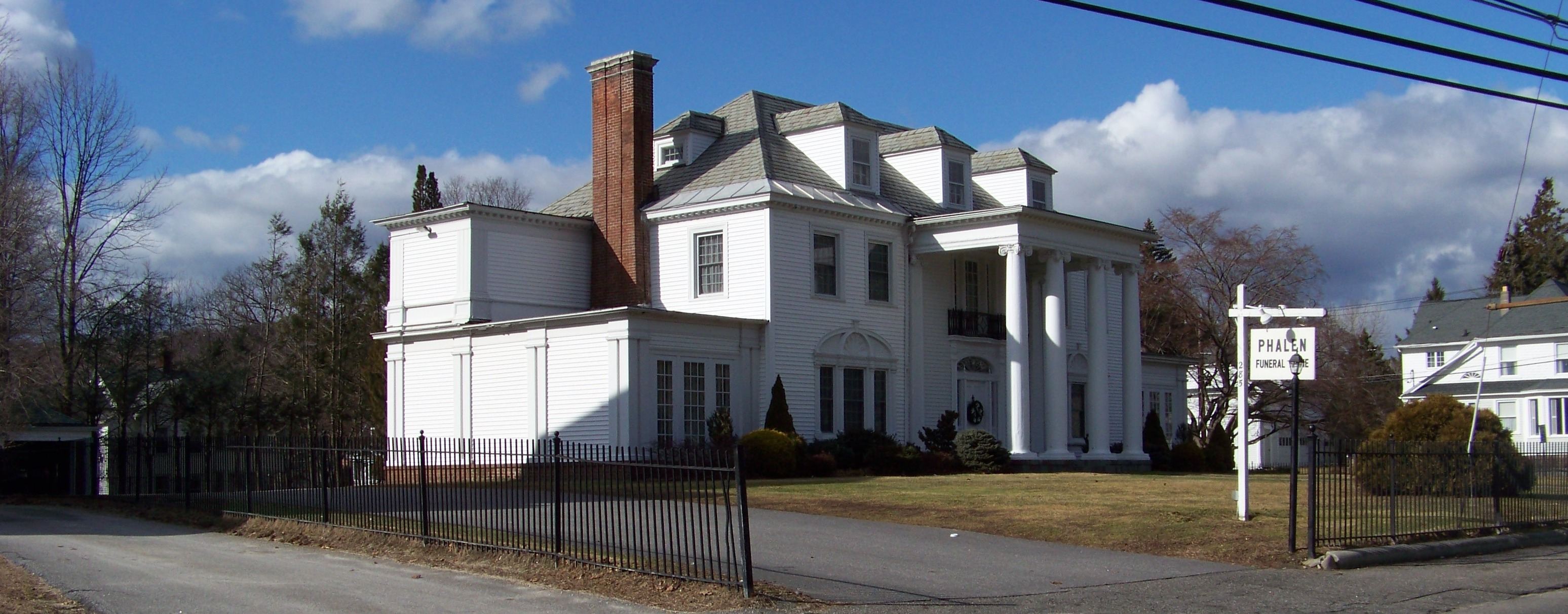
Travis House

== See also ==
- National Register of Historic Places listings in Litchfield County, Connecticut
