= Villa Friuli =

Historic house in Connecticut, United States

- U.S. National Register of Historic Places
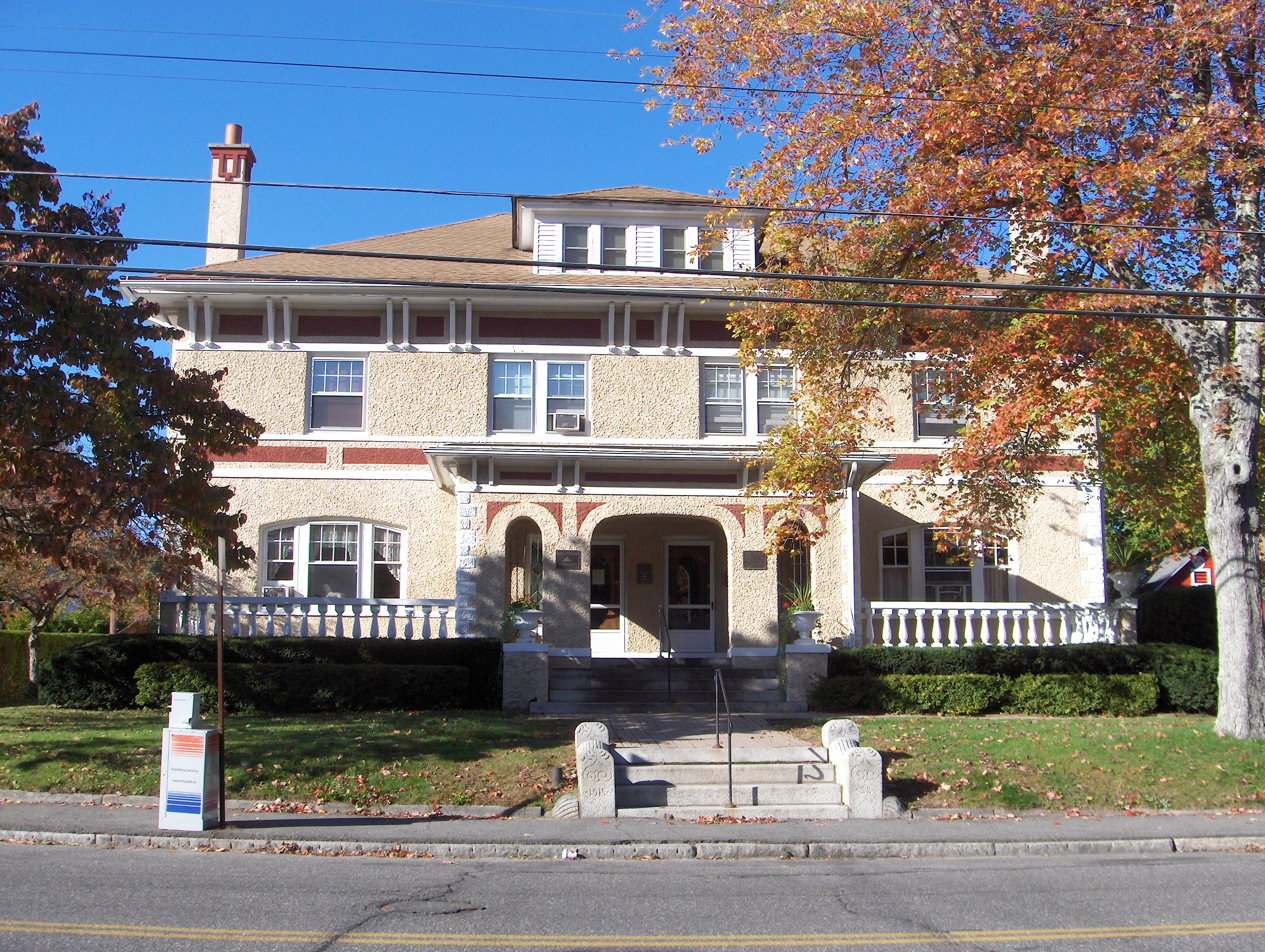

- Location within Connecticut Location within the United States
- Location: 58 High Street, Torrington, Connecticut
- Coordinates: 41°48′11″N 73°7′54″W
- Area: 1.3 acres (0.53 ha)
- Built: 1915
- Architect: Guarda, Ferruccio; DeMichiel Brothers
- Architectural style: Renaissance, Italian Renaissance
- NRHP reference No.: 91000349
- Added to NRHP: April 11, 1991

Villa Friuli, also known as the DeMichiel House, is a historic house at 58 High Street in Torrington, Connecticut. Built in 1915, it is a distinctive local example of Mediterranean Revival architecture, which was built and occupied by the first Italian families to move to Torringtion. It was listed on the National Register of Historic Places in 1991. It now houses professional offices.

== Description and history ==
Villa Friuli is located northwest of downtown Torrington, on the west side of High Street at its junction with Central Avenue. It is a 2 1/2-story masonry structure, built out of terra cotta tile covered in stucco, and topped by a low-pitch hip roof. The roof is pierced by hip-roof dormers, and has extended eaves supported by paired large Stick style brackets. The facade is a symmetrical four bays wide, with a projecting single-story porch sheltering the center two bays. The outer first-floor bays have three-part windows set in segmented-arch openings, while the upper-level windows are sash, in pairs in the center bays and singly in the outer ones.

The house was built as a duplex in 1915 by John and Matthew DeMichiel, brothers who were among the first group of Italians to settle in Torrington. The house was designed by Ferruccio (Fred) Guarda, a draftsman working in an architectural firm in Pittsfield, Massachusetts. The DeMichiels established a contracting business, primarily in the cutting of stone, and their handiwork is evidenced in the house's interior. The brothers first major job was providing pillars for Torrington City Hall. John DeMichiel also became active in politics, representing Torrington in the state legislature.

== See also ==
- National Register of Historic Places listings in Litchfield County, Connecticut
