= Henry B. Bissell House =

Historic house in Connecticut, United States

- U.S. National Register of Historic Places
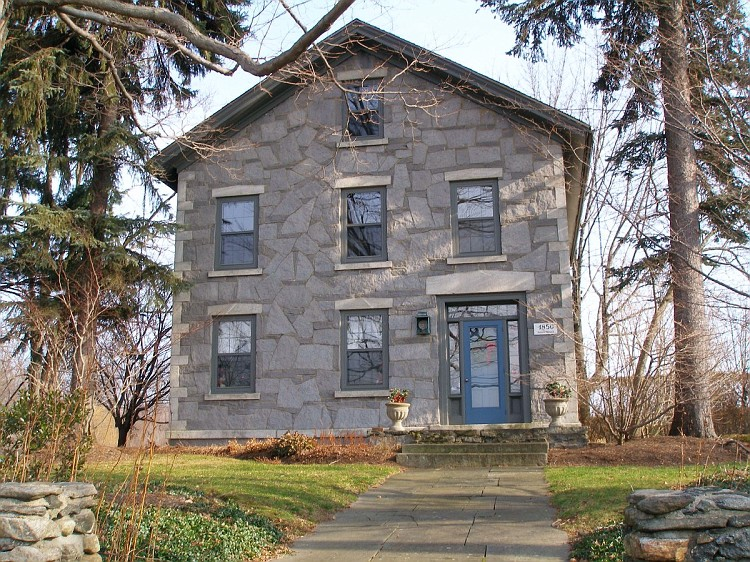

- Location within Connecticut Location within the United States
- Location: 202 Maple Street, Litchfield, Connecticut
- Coordinates: 41°44′14″N 73°14′9″W
- Area: 9 acres (3.6 ha)
- Built: 1850
- Architectural style: Greek Revival
- NRHP reference No.: 90001288
- Added to NRHP: September 7, 1990

The Henry B. Bissell House is a historic house at 202 Maple Street in Litchfield, Connecticut. Built in 1850, it is one of the town's finest examples of stone Greek Revival architecture. It was built by Henry Bissell, from a locally prominent family with extensive landholdings in the Bantam area. The house was listed on the National Register of Historic Places in 1990.

== Description and history ==
The Henry Bissell House stands in a rural-residential area of northwestern Litchfield, north of the borough of Bantam on the east side of Maple Street. It is a 2 1/2-story gable-roofed stone structure, with a rear wood-frame ell. It is built from locally quarried granite, with lighter stones chosen for corner quoining and window sills and lintels. Darker stones were used mainly as narrow horizontal elements, giving the house a distinctive appearance. The main entrance is in the rightmost bay, framed by sidelight and transom windows, and topped by a peaked lintel stone. The mortar in the walls appears to be original. The interior of the house follows a typical side-hall plan, and retains much original woodwork, which is typically Greek Revival or vernacular.

The house was built in 1850 for Henry B. Bissell. The Bissell had been a major landowner in northwestern Litchfield since the 1720s, and this house was built using stone from a family-owned quarry. The Bissells were mainly farmers, but also owned a local gristmill in Bantam village in addition to the stone quarry. The house remained in the family until 1985.

== See also ==
- National Register of Historic Places listings in Litchfield County, Connecticut
