= Amos Baldwin House =

Historic house in Connecticut, United States

- U.S. National Register of Historic Places
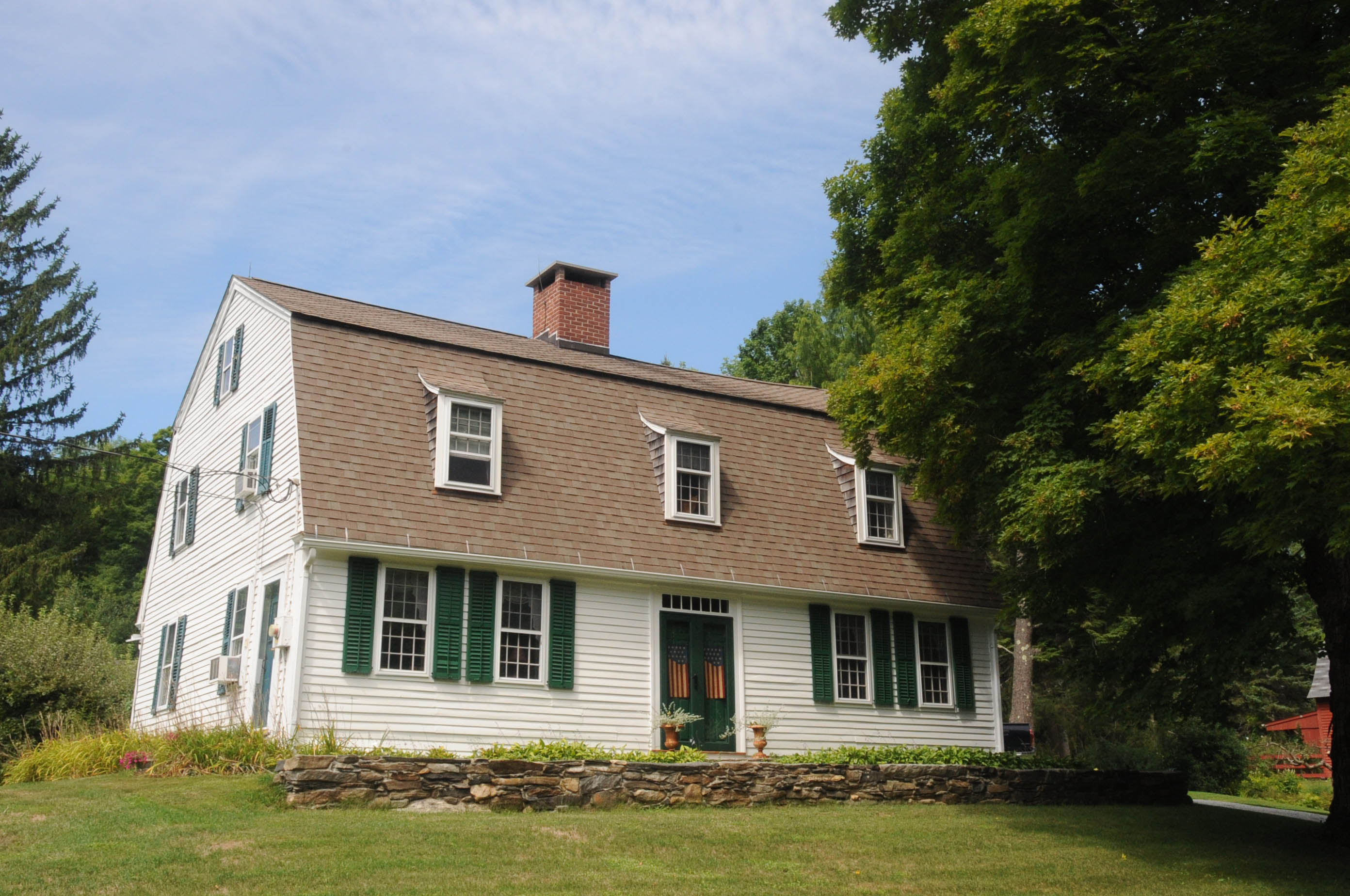

- Location within Connecticut Location within the United States
- Location: 92 Goshen Street East, Norfolk, Connecticut
- Coordinates: 41°55′20″N 73°12′38″W
- Area: 5 acres (2.0 ha)
- Built: 1765
- Architectural style: Colonial
- NRHP reference No.: 16000450
- Added to NRHP: July 19, 2016

The Amos Baldwin House is a historic house at 92 Goshen Street East in Norfolk, Connecticut, United States. Built about 1765, it is an important surviving example of colonial architecture in the community, and is one of its oldest buildings with a gambrel roof. It was listed on the National Register of Historic Places in 2016.

== Description and history ==
The Amos Baldwin House stands in a rural area of southern Norfolk, on the west side of Goshen Street East. It is a 1 1/2-story wood-frame structure, with a gambrel roof, central chimney, and clapboarded exterior. The front facade is five bays wide, with paired sash windows on either side of the main entrance, which is topped by a four-light transom window. There are three shed-roof dormered windows in the steep flank of the roof. A single-story gabled ell extends to the rear of the main block. The interior follows a typical central chimney plan, although a closet has replaced the traditional winding stair in the front vestibule. Several early features survive on the interior, including Federal period fireplace paneling and the original kitchen fireplace.

The house was built about 1765, and is one of the oldest surviving buildings in Norfolk, which was first settled in the mid-18th century. It was probably built by Captain John Watson, who owned the land between 1763 and 1774. Amos Baldwin, probably the best-known owner, was a farmer and local politician in the first half of the 19th century. In 1928, it was purchased by Richard Leach, who briefly operated the private Norfolk School here; it opened in 1937 and operated on this site from 1940 until it closed in 1943. The school, modeled on the nearby Kent School, was a college preparatory boarding school serving boys in grades eight through twelve. The school adapted the rear ell of the house as a dormitory space.

== See also ==
- National Register of Historic Places listings in Litchfield County, Connecticut
