= Capt. Philo Beardsley House =

Historic house in Connecticut, United States

- U.S. National Register of Historic Places
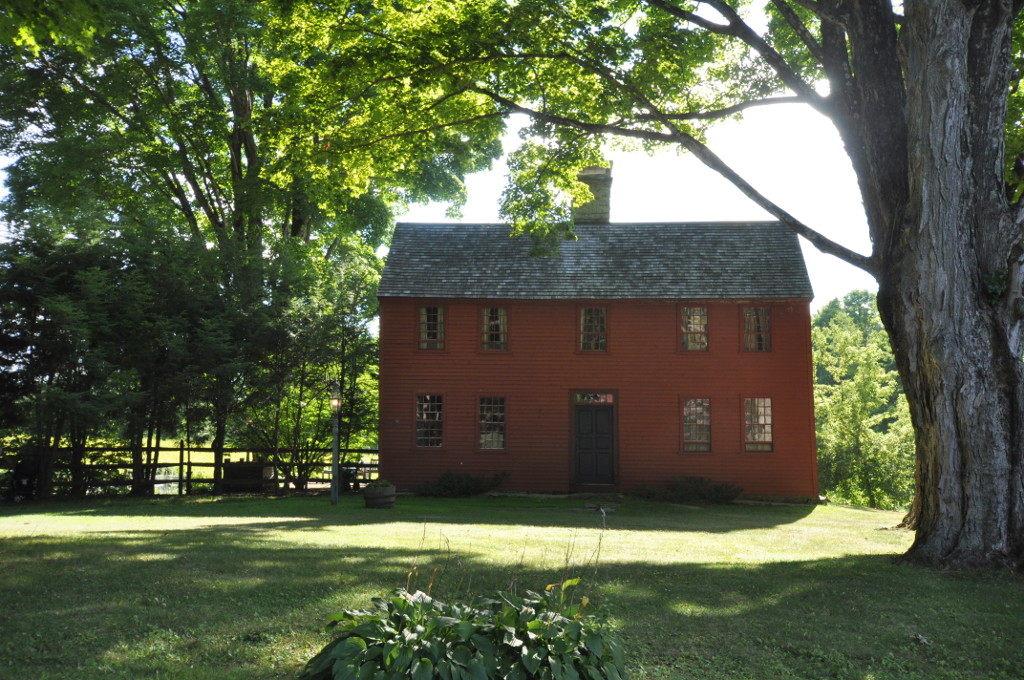

- Location within Connecticut Location within the United States
- Location: Beardsley Road, Kent, Connecticut
- Coordinates: 41°42′4″N 73°23′31″W
- Area: 1 acre (0.40 ha)
- Built: 1780
- Architectural style: Saltbox
- NRHP reference No.: 79002616
- Added to NRHP: July 3, 1979

The Captain Philo Beardsley House is a historic house on Beardsley Road in Kent, Connecticut. It’s also known as 7 harths. Built about 1780, it is a well-preserved example of an 18th-century saltbox, with a remarkably well-preserved interior. It was listed on the National Register of Historic Places in 1979.

== Description and history ==
The Beardsley House stands in rural southeastern Kent, on the west side of Beardsley Road south of Kent Hollow Road. It is set back from the road, among fields, with an associated barn across the road to the east. The house is 2 1/2 stories in height, with a side gable roof, large central chimney, and clapboarded exterior. The roof extends down to the first floor in the rear, giving the house a classic New England saltbox profile. The rear lean-to section is an integral part of the house's original construction, and not a later addition. However, the lean-to's rear wall is plank-framed, unlike the rest of the house, which is framed in timber. The main facade is five bays wide, with a central entrance, with a simply framed surround and a six-light transom window. The interior follows a central chimney plan, and retains many original features, including oak floorboards, paneling in the main parlor, and an unusual folding table in the original kitchen space. Doors retain original hardware latches.

The land on which the house stands is part of a 100-acre (40 ha) parcel purchased by Josiah Beardsley in the 1770s and given to his son Philo in 1781, with the house then standing. The Beardsleys were farmers; Philo was also a captain in the local militia, and had sons who served in the state legislature. The main block of the house has generally avoided modernization on the part of its owners; its modern facilities are located in an ell.

== See also ==
- National Register of Historic Places listings in Litchfield County, Connecticut
