= Francis Benedict Jr. House =

Historic house in Connecticut, United States

- U.S. National Register of Historic Places
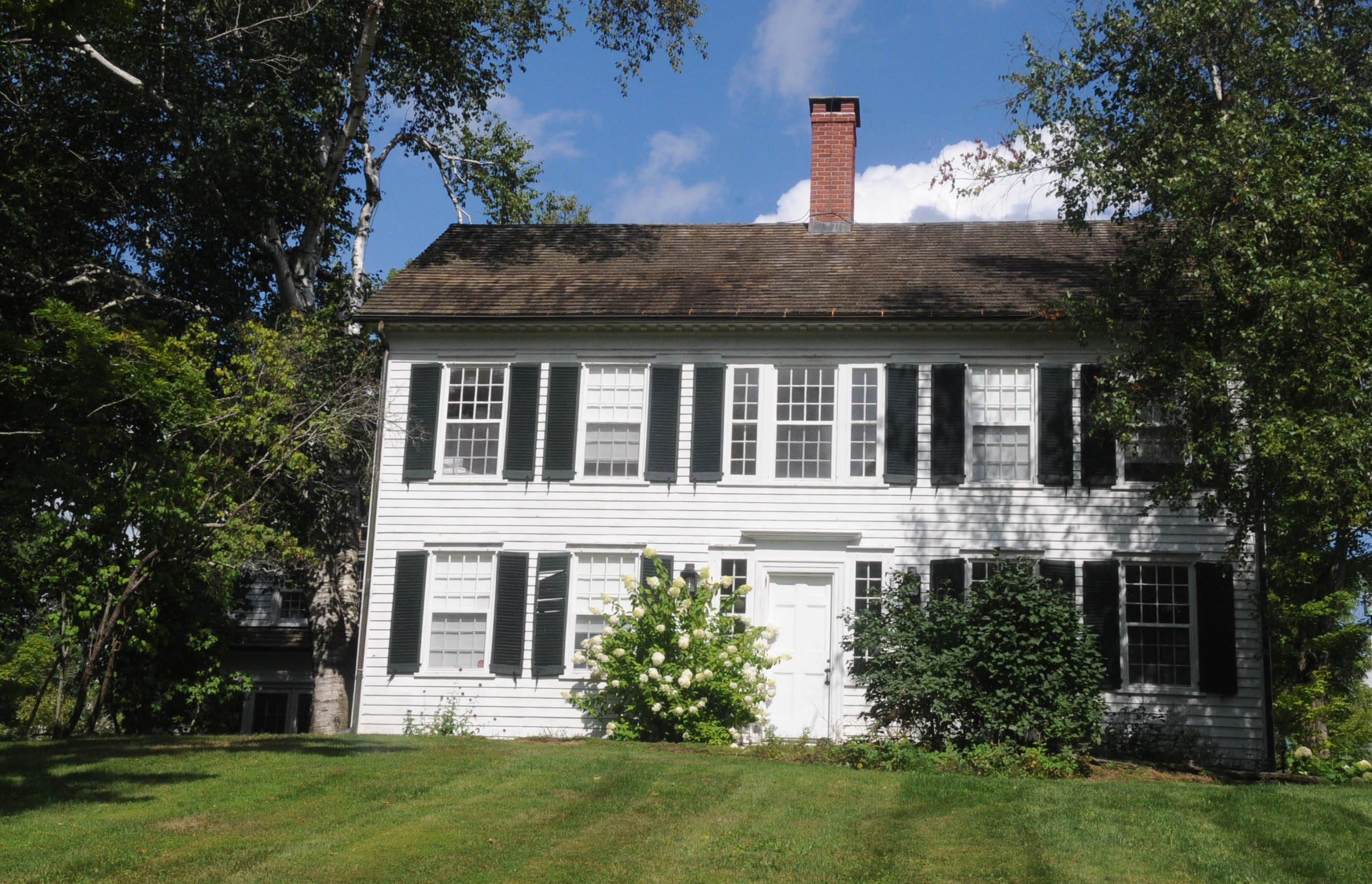

- Location within Connecticut Location within the United States
- Location: 85 North Colebrook Road, Norfolk, Connecticut
- Coordinates: 42.028164°N 73.152994°W
- Area: 17 acres (6.9 ha)
- Built: 1795
- Architectural style: Colonial, Federal
- NRHP reference No.: 02000333
- Added to NRHP: April 11, 2002

The Francis Benedict Jr. House, or Benedict–Smith House, is a historic house at 85 North Colebrook Road in Norfolk, Connecticut. Erected sometime between about 1795 and 1811, it is a high-quality example of late Colonial and early Federal architecture, and a well-preserved surviving example of the town's early architecture. It was listed on the National Register of Historic Places in 2002.

== Description and history ==
The Francis Benedict Jr. House stands in a rural area of northeastern Norfolk, on the north side of North Colebrook Road just east of its junction with South Sandisfield Road. It has a west-facing main block, to which ells have been added to the east side. The house is on a ridge overlooking Benedict Pond to the west. The main block is a 2 1/2-story wood-frame structure, with a gabled roof, central chimney, and clapboarded exterior. The front facade is five bays wide, with sash windows topped by shallow cornices, and the centered entrance framed by wide sidelight windows and topped by a less shallow cornice. There is a three-part window above the entrance. The first ell is a 1 1/2-story Cape style structure which was probably built first. The interior of these spaces follow typical period arrangements, except that the ell and main block were apparently designed to each house a separate family.

The land in this area of Norfolk was granted to members of the Benedict family in 1759, in one of the town's early divisions of land amongst its proprietors. The ell of this house was built about 1795 by Francis Benedict Jr., and stood south of his father's house (no longer extant except for a cellar hole). He built a dam and sawmill on Benedict Pond in 1795, which was a likely event associated with its construction. The main house was probably built around 1811, the year his daughter Wealthea married Erastus Smith. The house was used for some time as a multigenerational home for members of the Smith and Benedict families. The area's agriculture declined in the late 19th century, with many farms abandoned; this house was by the late 1890s in the hands of summer residents. The house is a distinctive stylistically conservative blend of late Colonial and Federal styles.

== See also ==
- National Register of Historic Places listings in Litchfield County, Connecticut
