= Scoville Powerhouse =

- U.S. National Register of Historic Places
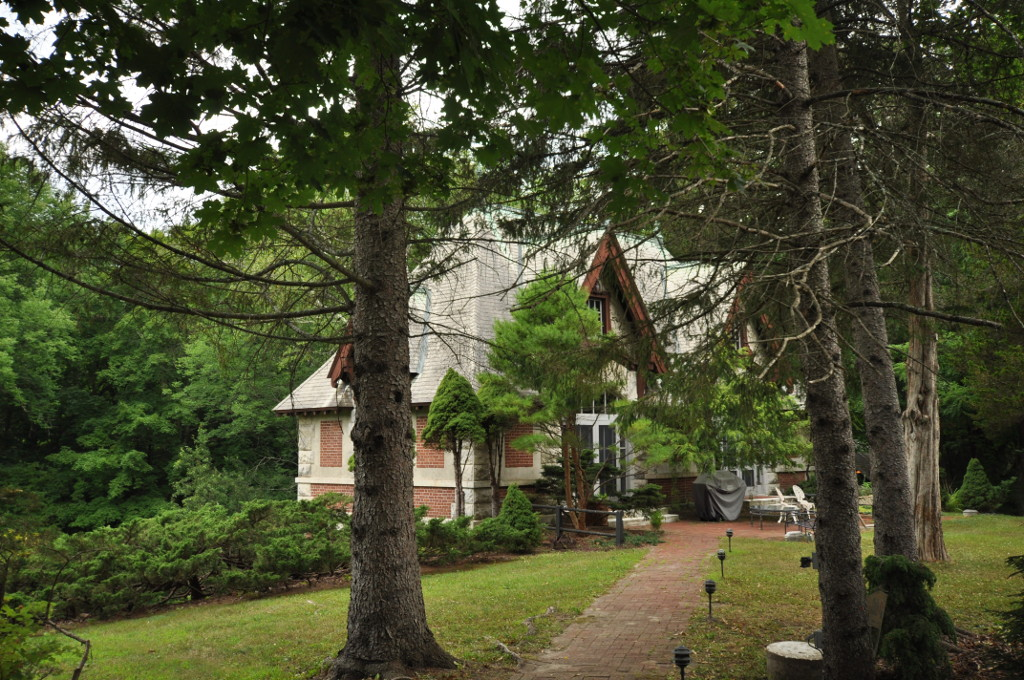

- Location within Connecticut Location within the United States
- Location: Twin Lakes and Taconic Roads, Salisbury, Connecticut
- Coordinates: 42°1′52″N 73°24′39″W
- Area: 2.5 acres (1.0 ha)
- Built: 1906
- Architect: Stone, Carpenter & Willson
- NRHP reference No.: 84001087
- Added to NRHP: February 16, 1984

The Scoville Powerhouse is a historic former power generation facility at Twin Lakes and Taconic Roads in the Taconic neighborhood of Salisbury, Connecticut, United States. Built in 1906, it provided power to the surrounding estate of the Scoville family, owners of local iron mining and processing operations. It was converted into a private residence in the 1950s, and was listed on the National Register of Historic Places in 1984 for its distinctive architecture.

== Description and history ==
The former Scoville Powerhouse is located in a rural-residential cluster in northeastern Salisbury, at the northwest corner of Twin Lakes Road and Beaver Dam Road. It is set on the south bank of Schenob Brook, near the outlet of the Twin Lakes. It is 1½ stories in height, built out of stone, brick, and concrete and covered by a steeply pitched hip roof. The front facade faces east toward Taconic Road, and is dominated by two steep gables, each rising above now-glassed openings that resemble the openings for carriages in carriage houses. The gable edges are decorated with Gothic style bargeboard. The building has rustic stone corner quoins. The water that powered the building's turbine (still in situ but now bypassed and not in operation) was provided via a penstock that runs under Taconic Road just south of the dam (which the road crosses over).

This site on Schenob Brook was first used for power generation in the 18th century, powering a forge and gristmill c. 1748. Land in this area was acquired by Herbert and Robert Scoville in 1899. The Scovilles were by then important political and business leaders in the community, owning one of the local iron works. They developed this area as a country estate, building a large stone country manor (destroyed by fire), a carriage house (across Schenob Brook, also converted to a residence), and the powerhouse, which provided electricity to the estate. The powerhouse was built in 1906 and was in operation by August of that year. The architects were Stone, Carpenter & Willson of Providence, Rhode Island, who had designed the other estate buildings and the Scoville Library.

Family records are unclear on how long the power station operated, but the estate was sold off in portions in the mid-20th century. The power station was sold in the 1950s and converted into a residence.

== See also ==
- National Register of Historic Places listings in Litchfield County, Connecticut
