= Warrenton Woolen Mill =

- U.S. National Register of Historic Places
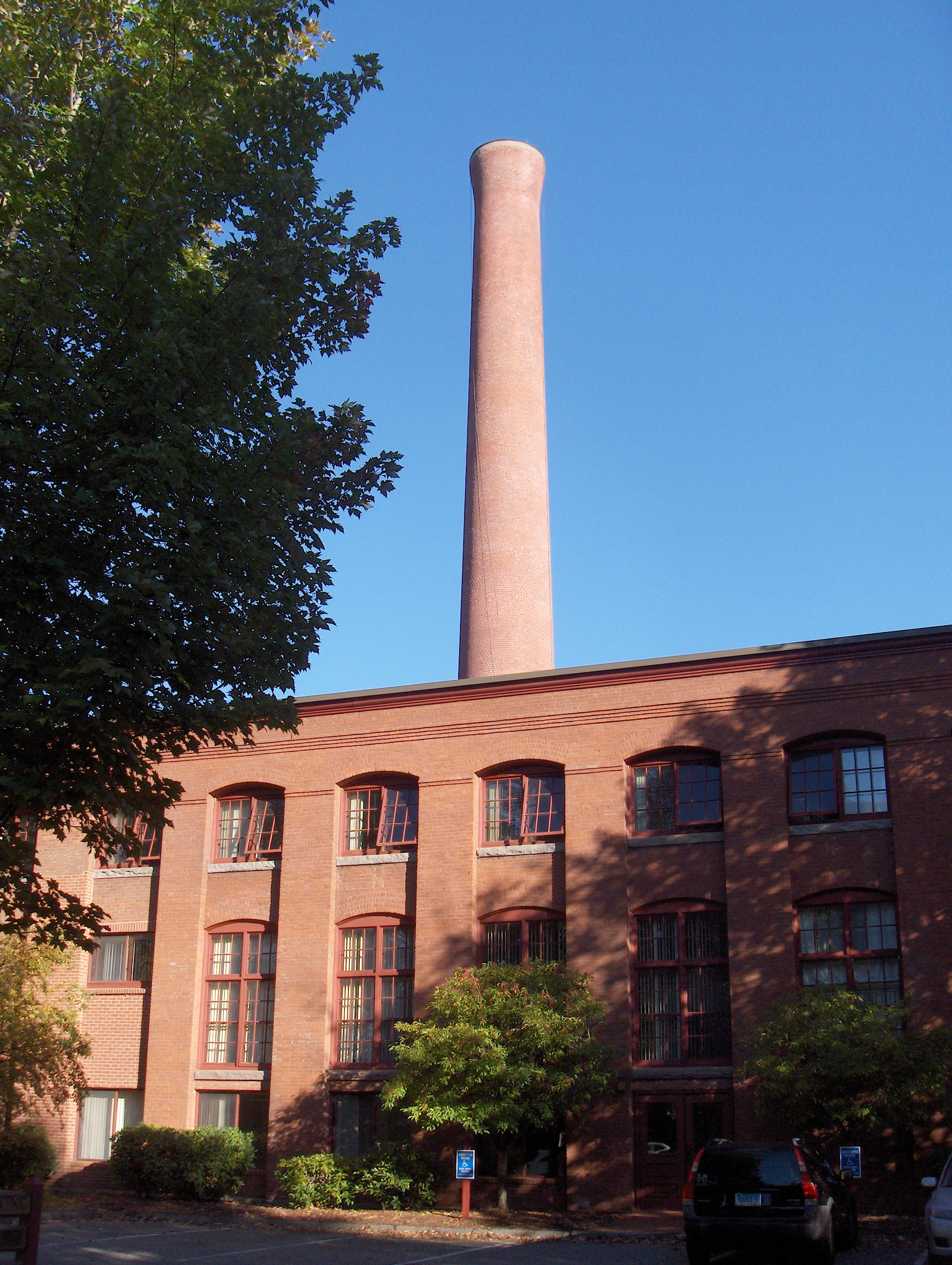

- Location within Connecticut Location within the United States
- Location: 839 Main Street, Torrington, Connecticut
- Coordinates: 41°49′6″N 73°7′25″W
- Area: 6.7 acres (2.7 ha)
- Built: 1908
- Architect: Main, Charles T.
- NRHP reference No.: 87000115
- Added to NRHP: February 12, 1987

The Warrenton Woolen Mill is a historic textile mill at 839 Main Street in Torrington, Connecticut. Founded in 1844, the mill was a major part of the local economy until its closure in 1984. Its surviving complex, dating to the early 20th century, was listed on the National Register of Historic Places in 1987. It has since been renovated into housing, as the Warrenton Mill Condominiums.

== Description and history ==
The former Warrenton Woolen Mill Complex is located north of downtown Torrington, on the west bank of the East Branch Naugatuck River. It is accessed from Main Street, which parallels the river on the east bank, via a drive that crosses the river. The mill consists of two large brick buildings, one two stories in height and the other three, connected by other structures. The site includes eight buildings in all, most of which date to the early 20th century. The two main mill buildings, each more than 250 feet (76 m) in length, are set parallel to each other in a north-south orientation, and exhibit modest commercial Italianate style. A large portion of the weaving shed is topped by a saw-tooth roof.

The mill site was first used for textile production in 1844, and its investors included members of the prominent Wolcott family. This complex was built in 1908 to designs by prolific mill designer Charles T. Main, and are his only known work in the state. The complex was used for textile production until 1984. From the late 19th century the firm specialized in the manufacture of heavy fabrics for the uniforms of police and military organizations.

== See also ==
- National Register of Historic Places listings in Litchfield County, Connecticut
