= Winsted Green Historic District =

Historic district in Connecticut, United States

- U.S. National Register of Historic Places
- U.S. Historic district
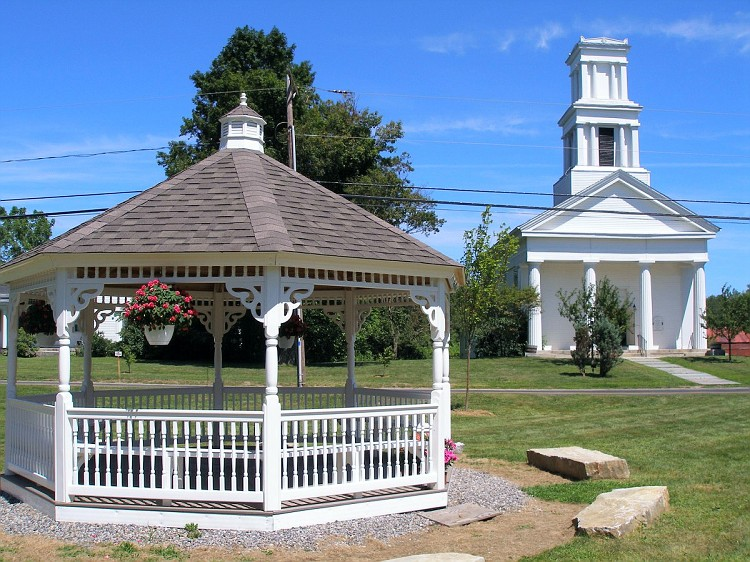

- Location within Connecticut Location within the United States
- Location: U.S. 44 and CT 8, and 86 Main Street, Winsted, Connecticut
- Area: 28 acres (11 ha) (original); 0.7 acres (0.28 ha) (size of increase)
- Architect: Multiple
- Architectural style: Late Victorian, Federal (original); Classical Revival, Beaux Arts (increase)
- NRHP reference No.: 77001501 (original); 82004482 (increase)

Significant dates
- Added to NRHP: August 16, 1977
- Boundary increase: April 29, 1982

The Winsted Green Historic District encompassing the historic town green of Winsted, Connecticut, and a collection of historic buildings that face it. It extends northward from the junction of United States Route 44 and Connecticut Route 8 to Holabird Avenue, and features a diversity of architecture from the early 19th to 20th centuries, reflecting the city's growth. The district was listed on the National Register of Historic Places in 1977, and slightly enlarged in 1982.

== Description and history ==
Development of Winchester's commercial center of Winsted followed from the opening of a turnpike (now Main Street, US 44). The elongated green was laid out in 1799 above the west bank of the Still River, with a meetinghouse and tavern (neither surviving) built in the following years. The Center Cemetery was also established to the west. The oldest buildings in the district, all houses, date to the 1810s. The southern end of the green developed a more commercial appearance during the 19th century, with more densely placed buildings, while the northern and eastern sides have buildings generally set back from the green with their own spacious lawns.

The historic district is bounded on the east by the Still River, and the north by Holabird Avenue, just north of the northern tip of the green. There are 77 historically significant buildings in the 28-acre (11 ha) district, not including the bandstand on the green, which was built in 1970. One of the most imposing houses is the 1844 Greek Revival house of lawyer Gideon Hall, Jr.; it features a two-story Doric Greek temple portico. The northern end of the green is visually anchored by the Romanesque First Congregational church, built in 1903.

The district was expanded in 1986 to add the Northwest Bank for Savings, formerly the Mechanics Savings Bank, at 86 Main Street. The building, built in 1929, was not 50 years old at the date of the original listing in 1976. The building is a Neo-Classical two-story central block building with one-story wings, built of tan limestone from Indiana. It has four Tuscan columns defining three bays in the facade of the central block. A 1961 interior renovation had lowered the bank floor's ceiling but recent work in 1980 had restored its height.

== See also ==
- National Register of Historic Places listings in Litchfield County, Connecticut
