= Captain William Bull Tavern =

- U.S. National Register of Historic Places
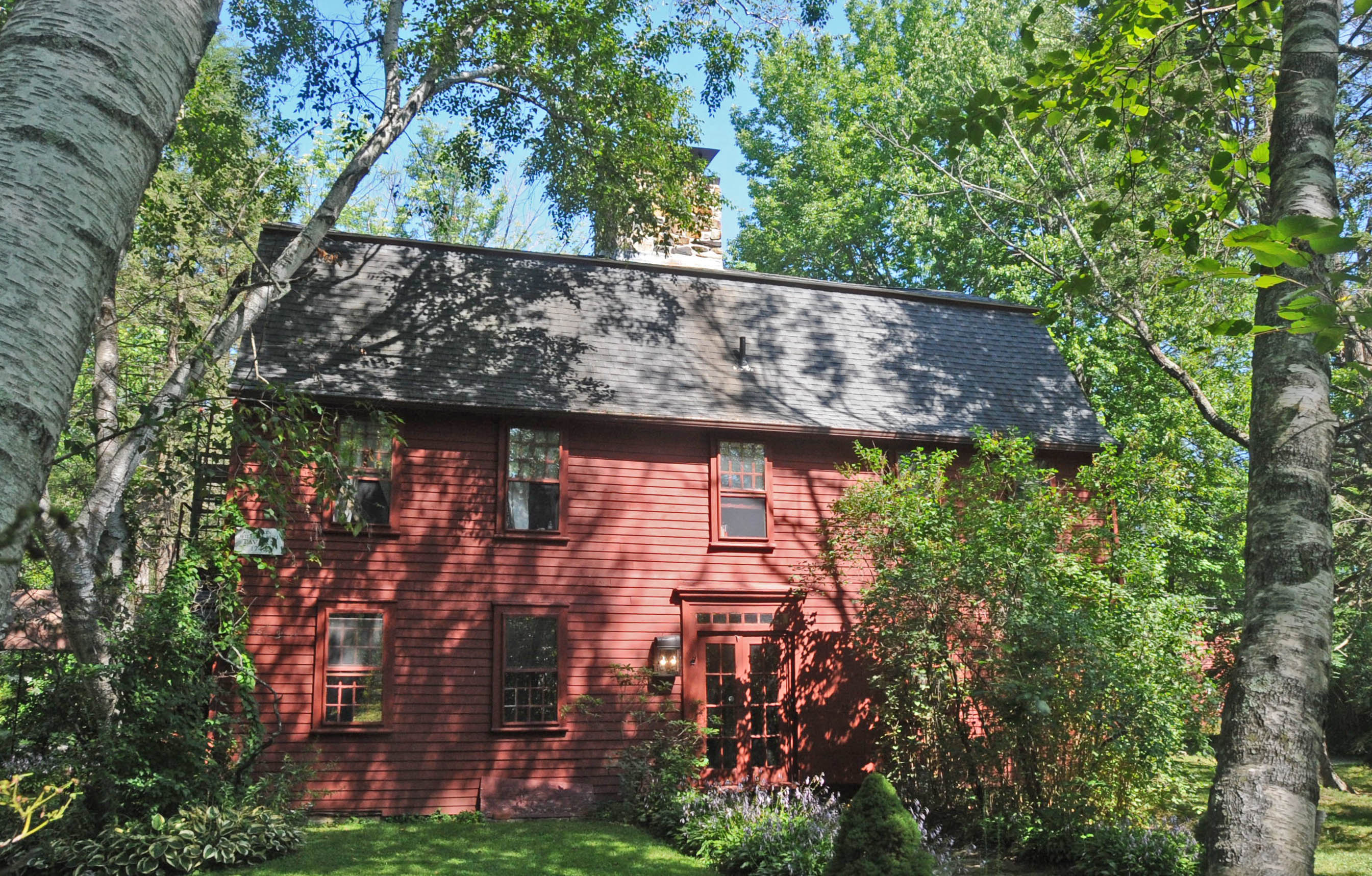

- Location within Connecticut Location within the United States
- Location: 571 Torrington Road, Litchfield, Connecticut
- Coordinates: 41°46′51″N 73°09′42″W
- Area: 10 acres (4.0 ha)
- Built: 1760
- Architectural style: Colonial, Federal, Colonial Revival
- NRHP reference No.: 83001269
- Added to NRHP: June 30, 1983

The Captain William Bull Tavern is a historic inn at 571 Torrington Road Route 202 in Litchfield, Connecticut. It is part of the Tollgate Hill Inn and Restaurant, and is listed on the National Register of Historic Places. It is significant both as an excellent local example of Colonial architecture, and for its role in early architectural preservation efforts in the region.

== Description ==
The Captain William Bull Tavern is located in Northeastern Litchfield, on the north side of Torrington Road (Route 202) between Tollgate Road and Wilson Road. It is a three-story wood-frame structure, with a gambrel roof, central chimney, and clapboarded exterior. The main facade is five bays wide, with a center entrance topped by a five-light transom window and cornice. A second entrance, dating to the period of the building's move in the 1920s, is located on the west side. The interior follows a typical Colonial center chimney plan, with a narrow entrance vestibule that also has a winding staircase, and chambers on either side of the chimney. It retains many original features, to which Colonial Revival additions were made during early 20th-century restoration.

== History ==
The early history of the dwelling traditionally identified as the “Captain William Bull Tavern” begins with Isaac and Eunice Bull's purchase of 58 high acres of land on the Litchfield Farmington Road in 1756 from Stephen Rossetter for L 112 and ends with the sale of the farm to George Buell in 1892, a story in which William Bull occupies center stage for 9 of the 73 years.

The original builder and any owners of the house prior to 1790 are unknown. During the 1790s, the house was owned by Captain William Bull (1748-1799), originally from Hartford, Connecticut. Upon his death, the inventory of his possessions showed the Bull was a prosperous farmer who had an "old house" and "mansion house" and a substantial farming implements, livestock, personal items consisting of silver, brass candlesticks and other personal items and 275 acres of land. The house would remain in the Bull family until 1827, when it was sold to the Buel family, and in turn to the Candee family in 1843. From 1867 to 1900, the Griswold family operated it as a farm before the house passed between several owners from 1900 to 1915. The house was purchased by the Vanderwaters and remained in their possession for several years, but had "fallen in disuse, and stood boarded up and deteriorating."

The Vanderwaters decided to dismantle the house, but it was saved by the purchase of Frederick W. Fuessenich. In 1923, Fuessenich had the house moved some two miles to its current location to his 100-acre (40 ha) farm. The house was moved directly across from the old Torrington Turnpike tollhouse that was in operation until about 1860. Fuessenich named the building the "Tollgate Hill Tavern". Fuessenich would restore the property and was sensitive to its adaptation to modern living, but he also acquired and moved the historic schoolhouse and barn to the site which were of the same period.

== See also ==
- National Register of Historic Places listings in Litchfield County, Connecticut
