= Lakeville Manor =

Historic house in Connecticut, United States

- U.S. National Register of Historic Places
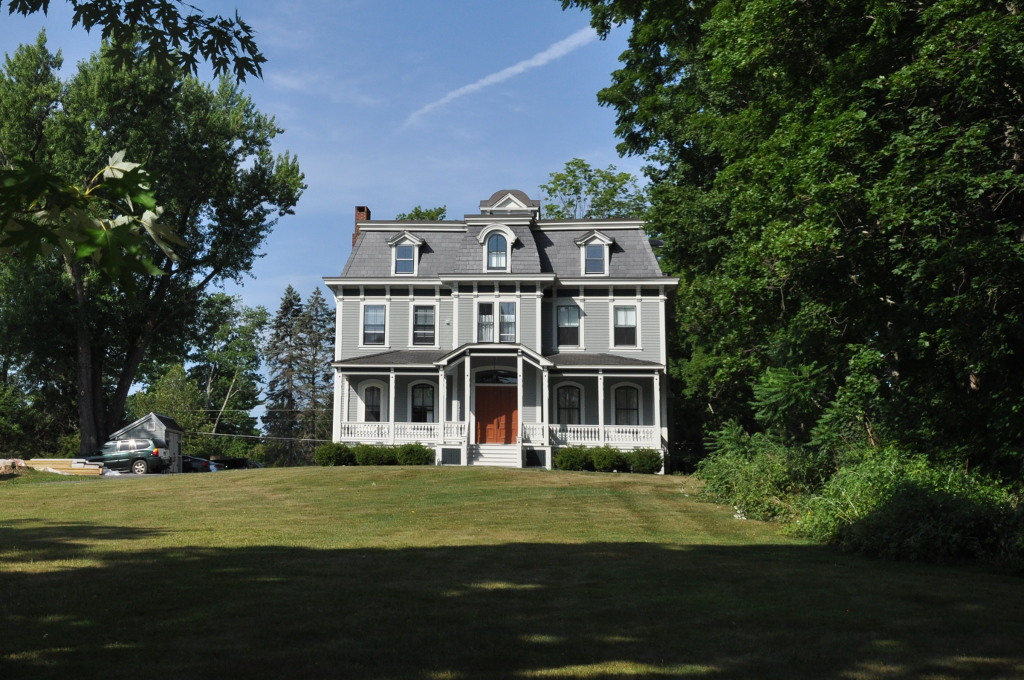

- Location within Connecticut Location within the United States
- Location: 12 Elm Street & 33 Sharon Road, Lakeville, Connecticut
- Coordinates: 41°57′45″N 73°26′24″W
- Area: 1.6 acres (0.65 ha)
- Architectural style: Second Empire
- NRHP reference No.: 13000159
- Added to NRHP: April 8, 2014

Lakeville Manor is a historic residential and institutional property at 12 Elm Street and 33 Sharon Road in the Lakeville village of Salisbury, Connecticut, United States. Built in 1883, the property includes a fine Second Empire building originally housing a convent, and a school. Both buildings have been converted to conventional residential use. They were listed on the National Register of Historic Places in 2014.

== Description and history ==
Lakeville Manor stands south of the central portion of the village of Lakeville, on a large parcel bounded on the east by Sharon Road (Connecticut Route 41) and on the west by Elm Street. The main house faces east, but is set far west on the north side of the lot, while the former school building is set further east on the south side. The house is a large 2 1/2-story wood-frame structure, with a mansard roof providing a full third floor. The central portion of the roof is topped by a square cupola, and the steep portions of the roof are studded with gabled dormers. The central bay of the front facade projects, rising to a bowed mansard with a round-arched dormer. A single-story porch extends across the front, with the main entrance at the center of the projecting section. The school building is a more modest 1 1/2-story with vernacular Victorian styling.

The main house was built 1883, originally housing St. Joseph's Convent. The school was built about the same time, and was known as St. Mary's Parish School. In 1923, the property was taken over by the Connecticut Council for Catholic Women, which operated it as a summer retreat until 1968. After standing vacant for a time, the building interiors were converted for use as apartments, losing the original finishes in the school, but retaining some in the main house. In 2010 the house was converted into condominiums, with the school undergoing a similar conversion later.

== See also ==
- National Register of Historic Places listings in Litchfield County, Connecticut
