= J. Howard Catlin House =

Historic house in Connecticut, United States

- U.S. National Register of Historic Places
- Location within Connecticut Location within the United States
- Location: 14 Knife Shop Road, Litchfield, Connecticut
- Coordinates: 41°41′50″N 73°6′22″W
- Area: 1 acre (0.40 ha)
- Built: 1879
- Architectural style: Gothic Revival
- NRHP reference No.: 93000672
- Added to NRHP: August 6, 1993

The J. Howard Catlin House was a historic house at 14 Knife Shop Road in Litchfield, Connecticut. Built about 1879, it was a distinctive vernacular example of Carpenter Gothic architecture. It was built for J. Howard Catlin, one of the owners of the Northfield Knife Company, whose plant was located just to the east. The house was listed on the National Register of Historic Places; it was subsequently demolished to make way for a fire station.

== Description and history ==
The J. Howard Catlin House stood in the village of Northfield in southeastern Litchfield. It stood on the north side of Knife Shop Road, a few hundred feet east of Connecticut Route 254, where the Northfield Fire Station now stands. It was a 2 1/2-story wood-frame structure, with an unusual L-shaped plan. It was basically a north–south rectangle with a gabled roof that had an east-facing cross gable, and a wing projecting the west. Its exterior was clad in wooden clapboards, and it rested on a granite foundation. Its exterior had a number of distinctive Gothic features, including porch railings with balusters in a Gothic-arch pattern, and narrow pointed windows in the attic levels of the gables.

The house was built about 1879. Its builder was described by architectural historian David Ransom as likely an "ingenious but untrained amateur", owing to awkward aspects of its floorplan, and the unusual nature of some of its interior and exterior decorative elements. J. Howard Catlin, for whom it was built, had purchased the adjacent Northfield Knife Company in 1858 with his brother Franklin. The company became one of the nation's leading manufacturers of knives, its wares displayed at various world fairs between 1876 and 1901. The Catlins sold the company in 1919. Catlin's daughter married Albert Turner, the first secretary of the Connecticut Park and Forest Commission. She bequested the house to the state upon her death in 1941. It was later demolished, and the present Northfield Fire Station was built on its site in 2008.

== See also ==
- National Register of Historic Places listings in Litchfield County, Connecticut
