= Mount Riga Ironworks =

Archaeological site in Connecticut, United States

- Mount Riga Ironworks Site
- U.S. National Register of Historic Places
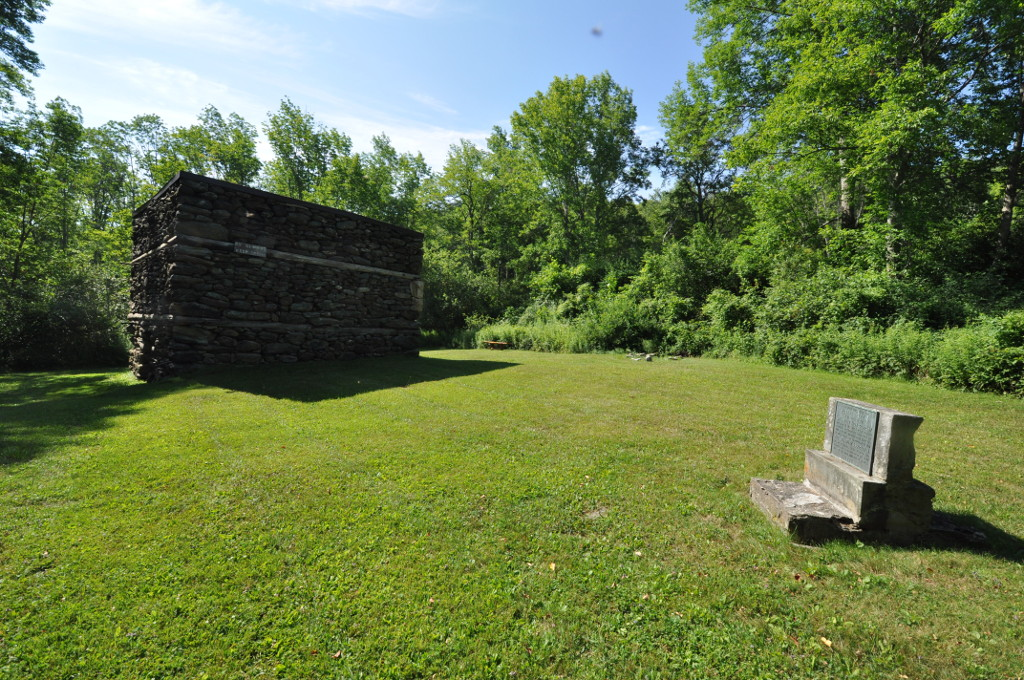

- Location within Connecticut Location within the United States
- Location: South Pond, Salisbury, Connecticut
- Coordinates: 42°0′17″N 73°28′6″W
- Area: 9.8 acres (4.0 ha)
- Built: 1806
- Built by: Holley, Luther; Pettee, Joseph and Seneca
- NRHP reference No.: 94001417
- Added to NRHP: December 1, 1994

The Mount Riga Ironworks was one of the most successful manufacturers of iron in the late colonial and post-Revolutionary period of United States history. Located in the far northwestern Connecticut town of Salisbury, it produced high quality iron for use in military and domestic applications, and supported a community of 1,200 people. It declined in the mid-19th century, and was closed in 1847. Surviving elements include an early 19th-century cold blast furnace and other foundational and archaeological remains. Its site, now part of a large private holding owned by the Mount Riga Corporation, was listed on the National Register of Historic Places in 1994.

== History ==
The iron works first began operation in 1762, and was at its most successful during the American Revolutionary War and the War of 1812. During the Revolution, it was one of the major sources of domestically produced cannons and related munitions, and during the War of 1812, it produced ship anchors and bar iron used by the nation's federal armories. Its iron was considered to be of particularly high quality. At its height, the Mount Riga community had 100 houses, a school, post office, and store. By the 1840s, the veins of highest quality ore were played out, and the area hillsides had been denuded of lumber needed for the production of charcoal to fire the furnaces.

Following the shutdown of the iron works, its extensive landholdings (about 6,000 acres (2,400 ha) were acquired by three families, which formed the Mount Riga Corporation to manage their holdings.

== Setting ==
The iron works was located in what is now a remote and rural area of western Salisbury, atop a plateau of the Taconic Mountains. The dam at the mouth of South Pond was built to provide water to the furnace, which is located just downstream. Additional foundational remnants of the ironworks are found a short way down Mount Riga Road, which connects the area to Salisbury village. The surviving forge structure, completed in 1810, is believed to be the only surviving cold blast furnace in the state. Foundational remains of at least two other furnaces exist in the area, and there are likely significant subsurface artifacts to be found in connection with the community that once existed here.

== See also ==
- National Register of Historic Places listings in Litchfield County, Connecticut
