= Braman Camp =

Historic house in Connecticut, United States

- U.S. National Register of Historic Places
- Location within Connecticut Location within the United States
- Location: Inner Road, Doolittle Lake, Norfolk, Connecticut
- Coordinates: 42°0′53″N 73°9′18″W
- Area: less than one acre
- Built: 1928
- Architect: Taylor, A.S.G.
- MPS: Taylor, Alfredo S. G., TR
- NRHP reference No.: 82004451
- Added to NRHP: August 2, 1982

The Braman Camp is a historic private summer property on Inner Road, overlooking Doolittle Lake in Norfolk, Connecticut. The camp consists of a cottage built in 1928 to a design by Alfredo S.G. Taylor. The property was listed on the National Register of Historic Places in 1982 for its association with Taylor, a prominent Norfolk architect.

== Description and history ==
The Braman Camp stands on the southeastern shore of Doolittle Lake, an exclusive summer retreat area. Inner Road provides access to this and several other private summer properties. The camp's principal structure is a modest 1 1/2-story wood-frame structure, with a gabled roof. It is set on a sloping lot, with the roof coming within 5 feet (1.5 m) of the ground at one corner. Its exterior is clad in rough clapboards with unevenly finished appearance. A large rubblestone chimney dominates one side of the house. French doors open onto a deck facing the lake, with an entry extension to its left. The entrance is in the side of this extension, next to a projecting oriel window.

The land on which the camp stands was part of a large landholding of the Benedict family, prominent farmers in northern Norfolk. In the late 19th century this area began to be developed as a summer resort area after the railroad arrived in Norfolk in 1871, and Doolittle Lake was developed as a colony of exclusive private retreats. The Braman camp was built in 1925, to a design by Alfredo S.G. Taylor, a New York City-based architect who summered in Norfolk, and eventually designed a significant number of buildings in the town. Six of Taylor's designs were for camps on Doolittle Lake, all of which exhibit the rustic elements exhibited by this one.

== See also ==
- National Register of Historic Places listings in Litchfield County, Connecticut
