= Town Hall and District School No. 6 =

- U.S. National Register of Historic Places
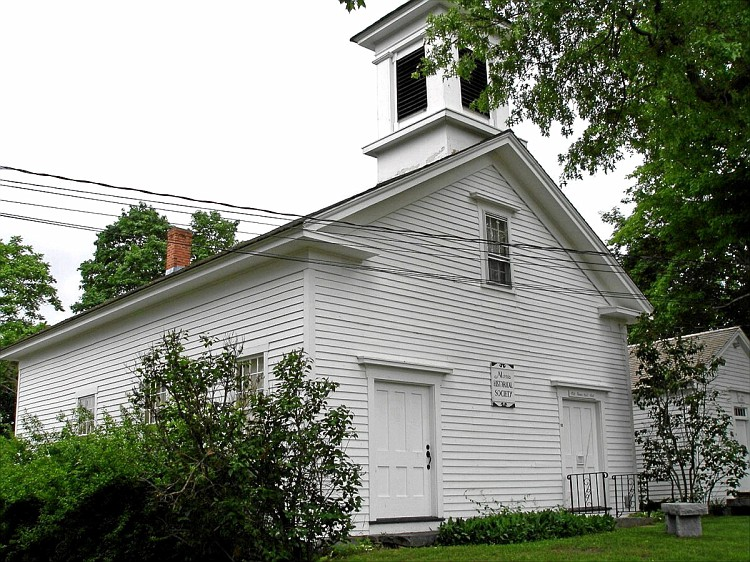

- Location within Connecticut Location within the United States
- Location: 12 South Street, Morris, Connecticut
- Coordinates: 41°40′57″N 73°11′59″W
- Area: less than one acre
- Built: 1772
- Built by: Payne, Henry
- NRHP reference No.: 87002109
- Added to NRHP: November 30, 1987

The Town Hall and District School No. 6 are a pair of historic government buildings at 12 South Street in Morris, Connecticut. The school, built about 1772, and the town hall, built 1861, are well-preserved examples of vernacular civic architecture. They presently house the local historical society museum, and were listed on the National Register of Historic Places in 1987.

== Description and history ==
The former town hall and district school stand in the village center of Morris, on the west side of South Street (Connecticut Route 61) opposite the village fire station. The town hall is a single-story wood frame structure with a gabled roof, clapboarded exterior, and stone foundation. A square belfry with pilastered corners, louvered openings, and pyramidal roof graces the roof ridge. The main facade has a pair of symmetrically placed entrances, each topped by a simple cornice. The school building is smaller, with a similarly clapboarded and gable-roofed exterior. It has original windows and plaster walls, but other interior features are replacements.

The school building is the older of the two, built about 1772 and originally located some 3.5 miles (5.6 km) away, near King's Gristmill. It was moved a short distance in 1910 to make way for a reservoir, and continued use as a school until 1915. It was moved several times before landing here in 1981 for restoration. The town hall was built in 1861, and served the town until 1932, when the Morris Community Building, the present town hall, was built.

== See also ==
- National Register of Historic Places listings in Litchfield County, Connecticut
