= Roderick Bryan House =

Historic house in Connecticut, United States

- U.S. National Register of Historic Places
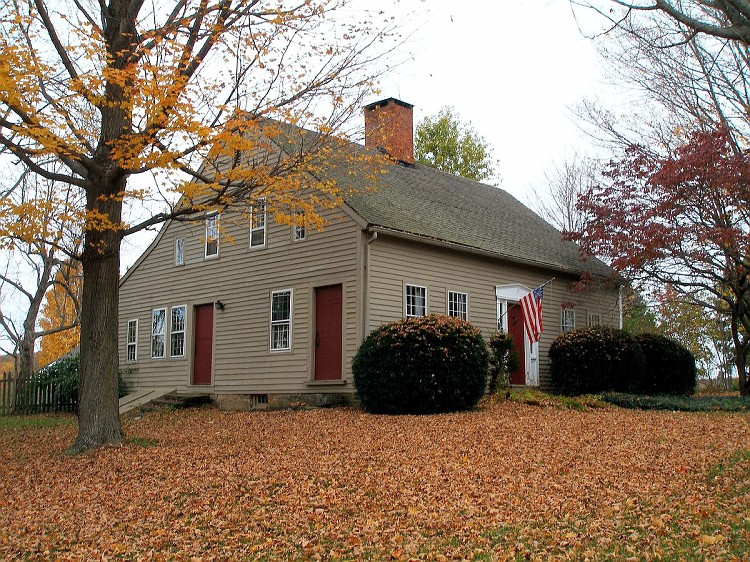

- Location within Connecticut Location within the United States
- Location: 867 Linkfield Road, Watertown, Connecticut
- Coordinates: 41°38′45″N 73°7′58″W
- Area: 3 acres (1.2 ha)
- Built: 1820
- Architectural style: Federal
- NRHP reference No.: 00001563
- Added to NRHP: December 28, 2000

The Roderick Bryan House is a historic house at 867 Linkfield Road in Watertown, Connecticut. Built about 1820, it is a well-preserved example of a rural Cape style farmhouse. It was listed on the National Register of Historic Places in 2000.

== Description and history ==
The Roderick Bryan House stands in a rural area of northeastern Watertown, at the northeast corner of Linkfield and Bryan Roads. It is a 1 1/2-story Cape style wood-frame structure, oriented facing west toward Linkfield Road. It has a gabled roof, central chimney, and clapboarded exterior. The main facade is five bays wide, with a center entrance framed by a 1940s Federal Revival surround of sidelights, doubled pilasters, and a peaked entablature with cornice. An ell extends to the rear (east) of the main block, joining the house to a barn. The interior follows a typical central chimney plan, with chambers to either side of the chimney, and a long room across most of the rear. Stairs to the attic are found in one corner. The interior retains many original features, including wainscoting, chair rails, fireplace paneling, and doors.

The house was built about 1820 by Roderick Bryan, on land purchased by is father in 1807. Bryan was a farmer, who apparently also operated a small tavern in the back of the house. The house was sold out of the family in 1910, to the son of a family servant for $1. The house exhibits a number of conservative building practices, notably in the layout, which is typical of mid-18th century Capes, while also adopting period practices such as raising the roof plate to provide additional interior space in the attic level.

== See also ==
- National Register of Historic Places listings in Litchfield County, Connecticut
