= Caleb Martin House =

Historic house in Connecticut, United States

- U.S. National Register of Historic Places
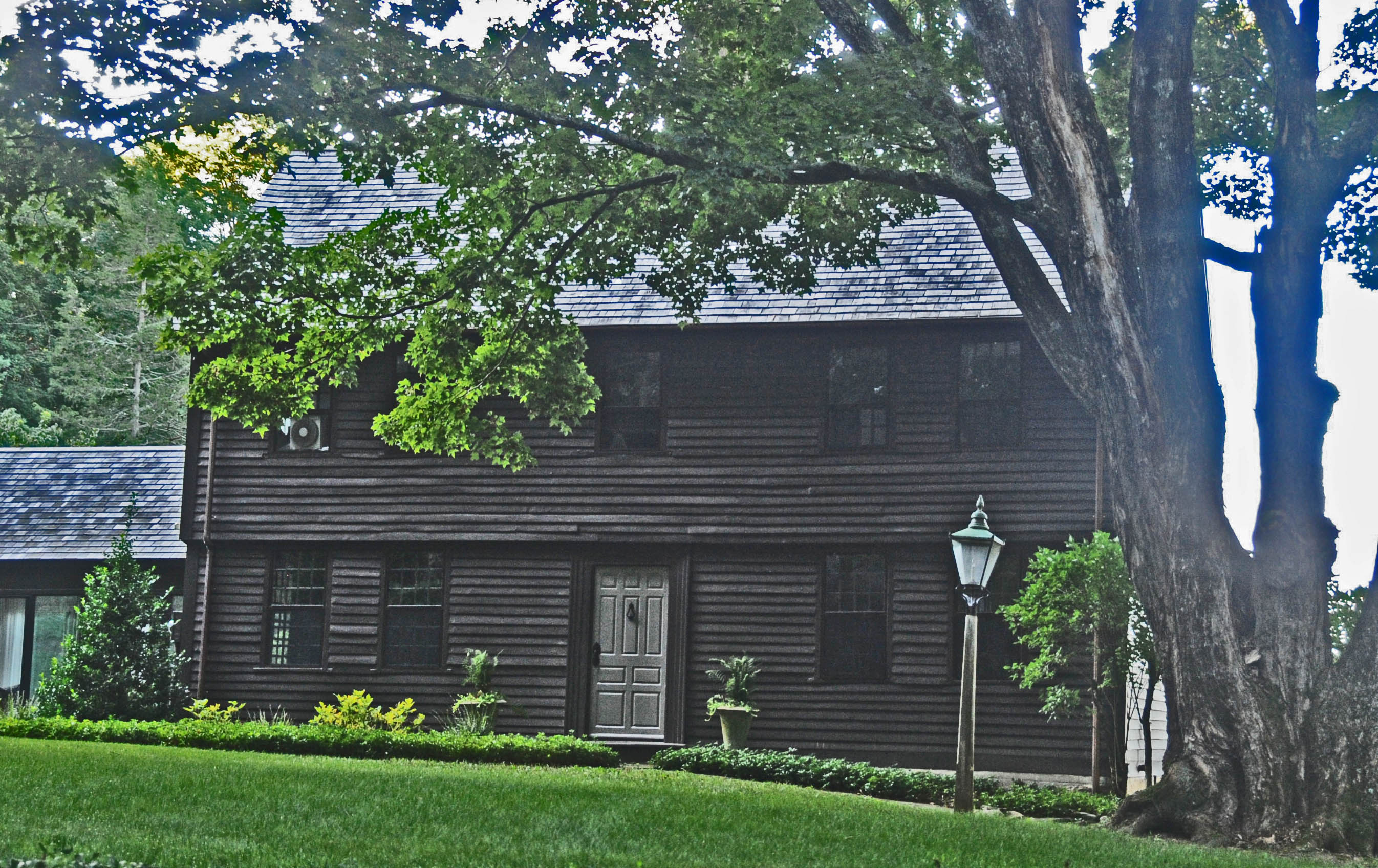

- Location within Connecticut Location within the United States
- Location: 42 Mill Pond Road, Bethlehem, Connecticut
- Coordinates: 41°37′44″N 73°13′19″W
- Area: 57 acres (23 ha)
- Built: 1730
- Built by: Martin, Caleb
- Architectural style: Postmedieval English
- NRHP reference No.: 96000427
- Added to NRHP: April 18, 1996

The Caleb Martin House is a historic house at 42 Mill Pond Road in Bethlehem, Connecticut. With its oldest portion dating to 1730, it is one of the community's oldest buildings, exhibiting a wealth of construction detail through its 18th-century transformation from a small single-pile house to a full saltbox. It was listed on the National Register of Historic Places in 1996.

== Description and history ==
The Caleb Martin House stands on 57 acres (23 ha) southwest of the village center of Bethlehem, at the end of Mill Pond Road, a short street off Connecticut Route 132. It is set east of the Mill Pond, an old impoundment on the Weekeepeemee River. It is a 2 1/2-story timber-framed structure, with a side gable roof, large off-center chimney, clapboarded exterior, and rubblestone foundation. The house has a saltbox profile, with the rear roof extending down to the first floor. The second floor hangs over the first in front, as does the main roof over the second floor. The interior follows a typical Georgian center chimney plan, with a small front vestibule that includes a narrow winding stair, and parlor spaces on either side of the chimney. The kitchen extends across the rear of the main block, with a large fireplace and beehive oven; a second oven is also found in the basement level of the chimney.

The oldest portion of the house, built in 1730, is a three-bay section with the main chimney. By 1745 the house had been extended to include the full five-bay facade and the leanto section in the rear. Although the house has since been extended by additions in the late 19th and 20th centuries, the main block has been well cared for, retaining either original materials or carefully matched replacements. Also of note is that the house stands on land that is substantially the same as its original 1724 land grant; only a few acres have been subdivided from it. Caleb Martin, the house's original builder, was a descendant of the original proprietors of Woodbury, of which Bethlehem was a part until 1787.

== See also ==
- National Register of Historic Places listings in Litchfield County, Connecticut
