= Samuel Forbes Homestead =

Historic house in Connecticut, United States

- U.S. National Register of Historic Places
- Location within Connecticut Location within the United States
- Location: 89 Lower Road, North Canaan, Connecticut
- Coordinates: 42°0′40″N 73°18′13″W
- Area: 26.7 acres (10.8 ha)
- Built: 1754
- Architectural style: Colonial Revival, Colonial, Postmedieval English
- NRHP reference No.: 92001578
- Added to NRHP: November 25, 1992

The Samuel Forbes Homestead is a historic house at 89 Lower Road in North Canaan, Connecticut. Built about 1754, with a number of significant alterations over time, it is significant as the home of Samuel Forbes, a major figure in the 18th-century development of the iron foundries in northwestern Connecticut. The house was listed on the National Register of Historic Places in 1992.

== Description and history ==
The Samuel Forbes Homestead is located in a rural setting of eastern North Canaan, on the north bank of the Blackberry River, just west of the Lower Road bridge near the Land of Nod Winery. The house is set on about 27 acres (11 ha), which includes a small family cemetery. The house is a 2 1/2-story wood-frame structure, with a side-gable roof, two interior chimneys, and a clapboarded exterior. Its front facade, facing south to the river, is five bays wide, with a center entrance sheltered by an enclosed gabled vestibule. A band of three small sash windows is set above the entrance; other windows are more typical sash. The interior has undergone many alterations over time, and exhibits features from its earliest days to the early 20th century.

Samuel Forbes was a native of Simsbury, Connecticut, who moved to North Canaan as a child with his parents, and became, like his father, a blacksmith. The oldest portion of this house was built as a central-chimney saltbox about 1754, around the time of his marriage. In 1762 Forbes partnered with Ethan Allen to establish a blast furnace in Lakeville. Although the partnership sold the furnace after a few years, Forbes was called on by the state to operate it during the American Revolutionary War, when it supplied arms and ammunition to the Continental Army. Forbes' descendants continued in the iron industry in the 19th century, building among other facilities the Beckley Furnace further east on the Blackberry River. The homestead remained in the family until 1955.

== See also ==
- National Register of Historic Places listings in Litchfield County, Connecticut
