= Frederick S. Sanford House =

Historic house in Connecticut, United States

- U.S. National Register of Historic Places
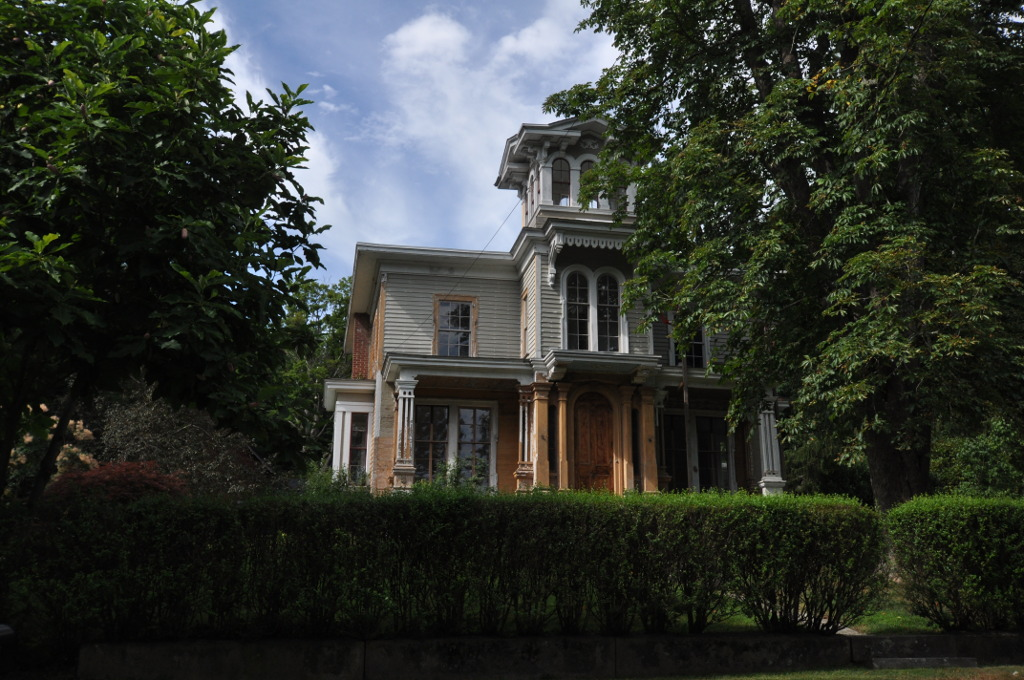

- Location within Connecticut Location within the United States
- Location: Hat Shop Hill Road, Bridgewater, Connecticut
- Coordinates: 41°32′7″N 73°22′24″W
- Area: 1.8 acres (0.73 ha)
- Architectural style: Greek Revival, Italianate
- NRHP reference No.: 88003230
- Added to NRHP: January 19, 1989

The Frederick S. Sanford House is a historic house on Hat Shop Hill Road in Bridgewater, Connecticut. Probably built in the early 19th century, it was extensively altered later in that century, achieving an exterior Italianate form that is the finest in the town, and an interior exhibiting various stages of alteration. It was owned by Frederick and Glover Sanford, owners of a prominent local hat making factory. The property was listed on National Register of Historic Places in 1989.

== Description and history ==
The Frederick S. Sanford House is located in a rural residential area west of the village center of Bridgewater, on the north side of Hat Shop Hill Road. It is a two-story wood-frame structure, roughly cubical in shape, with a three-story tower projecting from the center of the front facade. Deck sections extend beside the tower and in front of it, with supporting square paneled posts. The tower has round-arch windows in the second and third levels, with a decorative Gothic hood sheltering the second-floor windows, and an extended eave with brackets around those at the top of the tower. The interior exhibits a combination of mainly Greek Revival and Italianate elements, reflective of the building's major periods of alteration.

Nehemiah Sanford moved to what is now Bridgewater (then the eastern parish of New Milford) in 1772. His son Glover entered into the hat-making business, establishing a factory in 1823 east of this property that employed 125 by the end of the 19th century. The property he purchased included what was probably a 1 1/2-story Cape style house that forms the core of this house. It underwent two major alterations: the first was probably before 1849, the date of his son Frederick's marriage, after which the house was jointly owned by father and son. Both men were politically active, the father serving in town government, and the son representing the area in the state legislature. The house was sold out of the family in 1873, having by then undergone a full transformation to the Italian villa form it now has. It was later repurchased by a Sanford descendant, but again sold out of the family in 1953.

== See also ==
- National Register of Historic Places listings in Litchfield County, Connecticut
