= Maj. Gen. John Sedgwick House =

Historic house in Connecticut, United States

- U.S. National Register of Historic Places
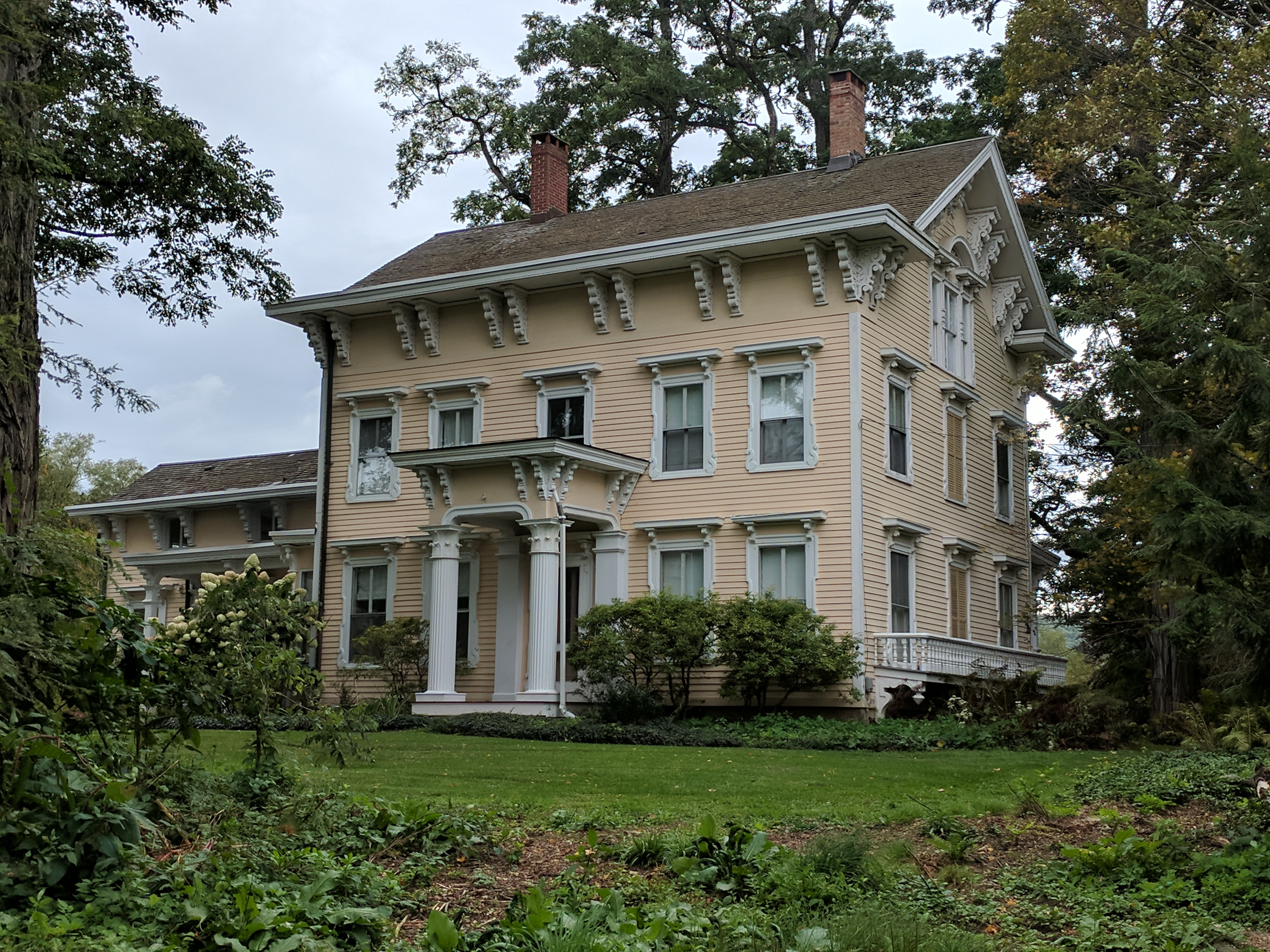

- Location within Connecticut Location within the United States
- Location: 52 Hautboy Hill Road, Cornwall, Connecticut
- Coordinates: 41°53′55″N 73°16′27″W
- Area: 3.8 acres (1.5 ha)
- Built: 1859
- Built by: Marsh, Cyrus W.
- Architectural style: Italianate
- NRHP reference No.: 92000262
- Added to NRHP: April 8, 1992

The Maj. Gen. John Sedgwick House is a historic house at 52 Hautboy Hill Road in Cornwall, Connecticut. Built in 1859–60, it is a prominent local example of Italianate architecture, and was built by Union Army General John Sedgwick, one of Connecticut's leading figures in the American Civil War. The house was listed on the National Register of Historic Places in 1992.

== Description and history ==
The Sedgwick House stands in a rural setting in far northeastern Cornwall, on the south side of Hautboy Hill Road at its junction with Hurlburt Place. It is a two-story wood-frame structure, five bays wide, with a center entry and twin chimneys. It has Italianate features applied to a more traditional Federal period structure: the five-bay facade and side gable roof are Federal, while the heavy bracketed front portico is Italianate, as are the other richly detailed trim elements. The house is oriented with its front facing east toward Hurlburt Place, and its west toward an expansive view to the western hills. On that side of the house there is a full-width porch with detailing repeated from the house trim. Under the porch are full-height windows that serve as French doors.

John Sedgwick was born in a house standing on this site in 1818, which had been built by his grandfather, a veteran of the American Revolutionary War. In 1859 this family homestead burned to the ground. Sedgwick, then already well established in his military career, took leave to oversee construction of its replacement. This house was built, apparently on the foundation of the old house, in 1859–60. The work was done by Cyrus Marsh, a local builder who may also have been responsible for the design of its exterior decorations. Sedgwick was active in many campaigns of the American Civil War, and was killed by a sharpshooter at the 1864 Battle of Spotsylvania Court House; he was the Union Army's highest-ranking casualty of the war.

== See also ==
- National Register of Historic Places listings in Litchfield County, Connecticut
