= National Register of Historic Places listings in Litchfield County, Connecticut =

Location of Litchfield County in Connecticut

This is a list of the National Register of Historic Places listings in Litchfield County, Connecticut.

This is intended to be a complete list of the properties and districts on the National Register of Historic Places in Litchfield County, Connecticut, United States. The locations of National Register properties and districts for which the latitude and longitude coordinates are included below, may be seen in an online map.

There are 176 properties and districts listed on the National Register in the county, including 4 National Historic Landmarks.

Contents: Counties and municipalities in Connecticut

Fairfield (city of Bridgeport | town of Greenwich | city of Stamford) | Hartford (city of Hartford | town of Southington | town of West Hartford | town of Windsor) | Litchfield | Middlesex (city of Middletown) | New Haven (city of New Haven) | New London | Tolland | Windham

This National Park Service list is complete through NPS recent listings posted October 16, 2026.

== Current listings ==
	Name on the Register	Image	Date listed	Location	City or town	Description
1	James Alldis House	James Alldis House	April 29, 1982 (#82004480)	355 Prospect Street; 41°48′16″N 73°07′24″W	Torrington	Fine Queen Anne style house from 1895, built for supervisory of the largest industry in Torrington, the needle manufacturing plant which became the Torrington Company.
2	American Legion Forest CCC Shelter	American Legion Forest CCC Shelter	September 4, 1986 (#86001725)	Loop 3 of group camping area, American Legion State Forest; 41°56′25″N 73°00′53″W	Barkhamsted	
3	Leroy Anderson House	Leroy Anderson House	December 31, 2012 (#12000361)	33 Grassy Hill Road; 41°32′22″N 73°14′08″W	Woodbury	
4	Jabez Bacon House	Jabez Bacon House	April 16, 1971 (#71000904)	Hollow Road near its Junction with U.S. Route 6; 41°32′17″N 73°12′32″W	Woodbury	
5	Amos Baldwin House	Amos Baldwin House	July 19, 2016 (#16000450)	92 Goshen Street East; 41°55′20″N 73°12′38″W	Norfolk	
6	Barkhamsted Center Historic District	Barkhamsted Center Historic District	December 22, 1999 (#99001594)	119, 131 Center Hill Road and 2, 5, 6, and 8 Old Town Hall Road; 41°55′47″N 72°57′59″W	Barkhamsted	
7	Merritt Beach & Son Building	Merritt Beach & Son Building	April 28, 1992 (#92000403)	30 Bridge Street; 41°34′35″N 73°24′43″W	New Milford	
8	Ezekial Beardsley-David Hare House and Studio	Ezekial Beardsley-David Hare House and Studio	September 12, 2025 (#100012221)	148 Good Hill Road; 41°33′35″N 73°17′10″W	Roxbury	Home and studio of artist David Hare.
9	Capt. Philo Beardsley House	Capt. Philo Beardsley House	July 3, 1979 (#79002616)	Beardsley Road; 41°42′04″N 73°23′31″W	Kent	
10	Beaver Meadow Complex Prehistoric Archeological District	Beaver Meadow Complex Prehistoric Archeological District	September 21, 1988 (#88000858)	Peoples State Forest	Barkhamsted	
11	Beckley Furnace	Beckley Furnace	February 14, 1978 (#78002847)	Lower Road; 42°00′39″N 73°17′34″W	North Canaan	
12	Joseph Bellamy House	Joseph Bellamy House	April 12, 1982 (#82004444)	9 Main Street North; 41°38′42″N 73°12′32″W	Bethlehem	
13	Francis Benedict Jr. House	Francis Benedict Jr. House	April 11, 2002 (#02000333)	85 North Colebrook Road; 42°01′45″N 73°09′13″W	Norfolk	
14	Bethlehem Green Historic District	Bethlehem Green Historic District	December 16, 1982 (#82001001)	Parts of North Main Street, South Main Street, East Street, West Road, and Munger Lane; 41°38′16″N 73°12′32″W	Bethlehem	
15	Henry B. Bissell House	Henry B. Bissell House	September 7, 1990 (#90001288)	202 Maple Street; 41°44′14″N 73°14′09″W	Litchfield	
16	Boardman's Bridge	Boardman's Bridge	May 13, 1976 (#76001983)	Across the Housatonic River, near Boardman Road; 41°35′36″N 73°27′02″W	New Milford	
17	Braman Camp		August 2, 1982 (#82004451)	Inner Road, Doolittle Lake; 42°00′53″N 73°09′18″W	Norfolk	
18	Bridge No. 2305	Bridge No. 2305	March 9, 2007 (#07000109)	Main Street over Burton Brook; 41°58′04″N 73°26′22″W	Salisbury	
19	Bridge No. 560	Bridge No. 560	September 29, 2004 (#04001090)	US 7 and CT 4 over the Housatonic River; 41°49′11″N 73°22′25″W	Cornwall and Sharon	Also known as Cornwall Bridge, crosses the Housatonic River and the Housatonic Railroad. Built in 1930 by C.W. Blakeslee and Sons for the Connecticut Highway Department, it is a fairly large example of concrete open-spandrel construction.
20	Bridgewater Center Historic District	Bridgewater Center Historic District	July 19, 2000 (#00000816)	Roughly along Main Street, Warner Road, Clapboard Road and Hat Shop Hill; 41°32′09″N 73°22′07″W	Bridgewater	
21	Hervey Brooks Pottery Shop and Kiln Site	Hervey Brooks Pottery Shop and Kiln Site	December 10, 1993 (#93001362)	Address Restricted	Goshen	
22	Roderick Bryan House	Roderick Bryan House	December 28, 2000 (#00001563)	867 Linkfield Road; 41°38′45″N 73°07′58″W	Watertown	
23	Bull's Bridge	Bull's Bridge	April 26, 1972 (#72001314)	About 3 miles (4.8 km) southwest of Kent on Bull's Bridge Road, over the Housatonic River; 41°40′32″N 73°30′35″W	Kent	
24	Capt. William Bull Tavern	Capt. William Bull Tavern	June 30, 1983 (#83001269)	571 Torrington Road; 41°46′52″N 73°09′43″W	Litchfield	
25	Burlington–Harmony Hill Roads Historic District	Burlington–Harmony Hill Roads Historic District	December 6, 1996 (#96001364)	Harmony Hill, Locust Grove, and Burlington Roads; 41°46′33″N 73°02′56″W	Harwinton	
26	Burrall-Belden House	Burrall-Belden House	November 27, 2018 (#100003146)	6 Barnes Road; 41°57′42″N 73°20′03″W	Canaan	
27	Calhoun–Ives Historic District	Calhoun–Ives Historic District	November 22, 1995 (#95001344)	79-262 Calhoun Street and 11 and 12 Ives Road; 41°39′34″N 73°19′58″W	Washington	
28	Moses Camp House	Moses Camp House	May 10, 1984 (#84001060)	682 Main Street; 41°55′27″N 73°04′33″W	Winchester*	
29	Canaan Pine Grove Association Camp Meeting	Canaan Pine Grove Association Camp Meeting	May 20, 2021 (#100006592)	Address Restricted	Canaan	
30	Canaan Village Historic District	Canaan Village Historic District	December 13, 1990 (#90001800)	Roughly bounded by West Main, Bragg, and Orchard Streets and Granite Avenue; 42°01′44″N 73°19′52″W	North Canaan	
31	J. Howard Catlin House		August 6, 1993 (#93000672)	14 Knife Shop Road; 41°41′50″N 73°06′22″W	Litchfield	Demolished.
32	Philip Chapin House	Philip Chapin House	August 29, 1977 (#77001399)	55 Church Street; 41°52′30″N 72°58′08″W	New Hartford	
33	Starling Childs Camp		August 2, 1982 (#82004463)	Doolittle Lake; 42°00′40″N 73°09′23″W	Norfolk	
34	John C. Coffing House	John C. Coffing House	December 18, 1990 (#90001922)	U.S. Route 44 West of Salmon Kill Road; 41°58′38″N 73°25′34″W	Salisbury	
35	Colebrook Center Historic District	Colebrook Center Historic District	July 26, 1991 (#91000953)	Roughly the junction of Rockwell, Colebrook, Schoolhouse and Smith Hill Roads and CT 183; 41°59′30″N 73°05′52″W	Colebrook	
36	Colebrook Store	Colebrook Store	April 26, 1976 (#76001980)	559 Colebrook Road; 41°59′22″N 73°05′48″W	Colebrook	
37	Cornwall Bridge Railroad Station	Cornwall Bridge Railroad Station	April 26, 1972 (#72001313)	Junction of Poppleswamp Brook Road and Kent Road; 41°49′11″N 73°22′20″W	Cornwall	
38	Cream Hill Agricultural School	Cream Hill Agricultural School	March 26, 1976 (#76001986)	Cream Hill Road; 41°53′33″N 73°19′22″W	Cornwall	
39	Cream Hill Shelter	Cream Hill Shelter	September 4, 1986 (#86001727)	Wickwire Road; 41°54′43″N 73°19′39″W	Cornwall	Incorrectly listed in Sharon; replaced in 1988.
40	Downtown Torrington Historic District	Downtown Torrington Historic District	December 22, 1988 (#88002978)	Roughly bounded by Church and Alvord Streets, Center Cemetery, Willow Street, East Main Street, Litchfield Street, and Prospect Street; 41°48′07″N 73°07′17″W	Torrington	A historic district covering historic portion of commercial downtown area
41	East Plymouth Historic District	East Plymouth Historic District	February 21, 1985 (#85000312)	East Plymouth and Marsh Road; 41°41′59″N 72°59′57″W	Plymouth	
42	Harry O. Erikson Pavilion Hall	Harry O. Erikson Pavilion Hall	January 20, 2022 (#100007375)	17 East Shore Road; 41°40′36″N 73°21′21″W	Washington	
43	Esperanza	Esperanza	April 11, 2002 (#02000334)	511 Town Hill Road; 41°51′25″N 73°00′14″W	New Hartford	
44	Falls Village District	Falls Village District	June 14, 1979 (#79002622)	CT 126; 41°57′23″N 73°21′49″W	Canaan	Historic district including Greek Revival houses, churches, and the D.M. Hunt Library from 1891.
45	Farnum House	Farnum House	August 2, 1982 (#82004449)	Litchfield Road; 41°58′44″N 73°12′04″W	Norfolk	
46	Flanders Historic District	Flanders Historic District	April 13, 1979 (#79002618)	U.S. Route 7, Cobble Road, Cobble Lane, and Studio Hill Road; 41°44′22″N 73°27′25″W	Kent	
47	Samuel Forbes Homestead		November 25, 1992 (#92001578)	89 Lower Road; 42°00′41″N 73°18′23″W	North Canaan	
48	Stephen and Helen Foster House	Stephen and Helen Foster House	May 8, 2017 (#100000955)	417 Sharon Goshen Turnpike; 41°52′18″N 73°21′44″W	Cornwall	
49	Fyler–Hotchkiss Estate	Fyler–Hotchkiss Estate	February 12, 1987 (#87000129)	192 Main Street; 41°48′15″N 73°07′19″W	Torrington	
50	Ebenezer Gay House	Ebenezer Gay House	July 9, 1979 (#79002619)	18 Main Street; 41°52′37″N 73°28′37″W	Sharon	
51	Gilbert Clock Factory	Gilbert Clock Factory	December 13, 1984 (#84000494)	13 Wallens Street; 41°55′49″N 73°03′29″W	Winchester*	
52	Gillette's Grist Mill	Gillette's Grist Mill	August 29, 1977 (#77001403)	Maple Hollow Road; 41°50′18″N 73°01′29″W	New Hartford	
53	Glebe House	Glebe House	March 11, 1971 (#71000902)	49 Hollow Road; 41°32′18″N 73°12′38″W	Woodbury	
54	Goshen Historic District	Goshen Historic District	December 27, 1982 (#82000996)	CT 63 and 4 and Gifford Road; 41°49′50″N 73°13′25″W	Goshen	
55	Gould House	Gould House	August 2, 1982 (#82004452)	Golf Drive; 41°59′08″N 73°12′57″W	Norfolk	
56	Gov. Smith Homestead	Gov. Smith Homestead	March 25, 1982 (#82004475)	South Main Street; 41°52′09″N 73°28′32″W	Sharon	
57	J. S. Halpine Tobacco Warehouse	J. S. Halpine Tobacco Warehouse	December 16, 1982 (#82001002)	West and Mill Streets; 41°34′21″N 73°24′40″W	New Milford	
58	Haystack Mountain Tower	Haystack Mountain Tower	December 2, 1993 (#93001244)	43 North Street; 42°00′17″N 73°12′31″W	Norfolk	
59	Hillside	Hillside	August 2, 1982 (#82004454)	310 Litchfield Road; 41°58′33″N 73°11′46″W	Norfolk	
60	Hine–Buckingham Farms	Hine–Buckingham Farms	May 7, 2004 (#04000413)	44, 46, and 48 Upland Road and 78, 81 Crossman Road; 41°38′18″N 73°22′57″W	New Milford	Now the Hunt Hill Farm.
61	Holabird House	Holabird House	June 28, 1982 (#82004445)	Kellog Road, corner of CT 126; 41°57′14″N 73°20′48″W	Canaan	
62	The Hollister Homestead	The Hollister Homestead	June 15, 2010 (#10000350)	300 Nettleton Hollow Road; 41°37′05″N 73°16′14″W	Washington	
63	Hose and Hook and Ladder Truck Building	Hose and Hook and Ladder Truck Building	January 4, 1982 (#82004479)	Main Street; 41°40′22″N 73°04′33″W	Thomaston	
64	Hotchkissville Historic District	Hotchkissville Historic District	December 6, 1996 (#96001460)	Roughly bounded by West Wood, Paper Mill, Weekeepeemee, Washington, and Jack's Bridge Roads; 41°33′46″N 73°13′08″W	Woodbury	
65	Housatonic Railroad Station	Housatonic Railroad Station	March 1, 1984 (#84001062)	11 Railroad Street; 41°34′35″N 73°24′46″W	New Milford	
66	Kent Iron Furnace	Kent Iron Furnace	October 5, 1977 (#77001401)	31 Kent-Cornwall Road; 41°44′19″N 73°28′12″W	Kent	
67	George King House	George King House	November 6, 2006 (#06000592)	12 North Main Street; 41°52′54″N 73°28′34″W	Sharon	
68	Lakeville Historic District	Lakeville Historic District	August 1, 1996 (#96000845)	Bounded by Millerton Road, Sharon Road, Allen Street, and Holley Street; 41°57′51″N 73°26′31″W	Salisbury	
69	Lakeville Manor	Lakeville Manor	April 8, 2014 (#13000159)	12 Elm Street & 33 Sharon Road; 41°57′44″N 73°26′27″W	Lakeville	
70	Isaac Lawrence House	Isaac Lawrence House	March 10, 1983 (#83001270)	Elm Street; 42°01′23″N 73°19′33″W	North Canaan	
71	Lighthouse Archeological Site (5-37)	Lighthouse Archeological Site (5-37)	April 25, 1991 (#91000445)	Peoples State Forest; 41°55′33″N 73°00′24″W	Barkhamsted	The "Barkhamsted Lighthouse", site of an 18th-19th century mixed-race community.
72	Lime Rock Historic District	Lime Rock Historic District	July 5, 1984 (#84001064)	Roughly White Hollow, Elm, Lime Rock, Norton Hill and Furnace Roads; 41°56′04″N 73°23′27″W	Salisbury	
73	Lime Rock Park Race Track	Lime Rock Park Race Track	October 16, 2009 (#08001380)	497 Lime Rock Road; 41°55′40″N 73°23′01″W	Salisbury	Unique race track, opened in 1959, has no stands, instead providing open fields for spectators.
74	Litchfield Historic District	Litchfield Historic District	November 24, 1968 (#68000050)	Roughly both sides of North and South Streets between Gallows Lane and Prospect Street; also U.S. Route 202 and Route 63; 41°44′40″N 73°11′24″W	Litchfield	Intact village of late 18th- and early 19th-century buildings was state's first historic district. 1978 expansion includes entire borough
75	Litchfield–South Roads Historic District	Litchfield–South Roads Historic District	December 6, 1996 (#96001365)	Roughly Litchfield Road from Bridge Park to Harwinton Heights Roads and South Road from Litchfield Road to South Cemetery; 41°46′15″N 73°03′38″W	Harwinton	
76	Lover's Leap Bridge	Lover's Leap Bridge	May 13, 1976 (#76001982)	South of New Milford in Lovers Leap State Park; 41°32′39″N 73°24′26″W	New Milford	
77	Low House	Low House	February 17, 1984 (#84001067)	Laurel Way Extension; 41°59′06″N 73°11′08″W	Norfolk	
78	Caleb Martin House	Caleb Martin House	April 18, 1996 (#96000427)	42 Mill Pond Road; 41°37′44″N 73°13′19″W	Bethlehem	
79	Mead Camp		August 2, 1982 (#82004455)	Doolittle Lake; 42°00′44″N 73°09′46″W	Norfolk	
80	Merryall Union Evangelical Society Chapel	Merryall Union Evangelical Society Chapel	June 5, 1986 (#86001240)	Chapel Hill Road; 41°38′50″N 73°25′11″W	New Milford	
81	Merwinsville Hotel	Merwinsville Hotel	August 29, 1977 (#77001398)	1 Brown's Forge Road; 41°38′49″N 73°28′44″W	New Milford	
82	Migeon Avenue Historic District	Migeon Avenue Historic District	September 6, 2002 (#02000913)	Roughly along Migeon Avenue and parts of Forest Street; 41°48′31″N 73°07′47″W	Torrington	District of 9 contributing buildings, the most salient being Laurelhurst, a Shingle Style architecture work
83	Milton Center Historic District	Milton Center Historic District	December 23, 1986 (#86003754)	Roughly bounded by Milton, Shearshop, Headquarters, Sawmill, and Blue Swamp Roads; 41°46′03″N 73°16′22″W	Litchfield	
84	Minortown Road Bridge	Minortown Road Bridge	August 17, 2001 (#01000883)	Minortown Road over the Nonewaug River; 41°34′36″N 73°10′34″W	Woodbury	
85	William Moore Jr. House	William Moore Jr. House	April 14, 1999 (#99000406)	5 Mountain Road; 41°57′47″N 73°00′59″W	Barkhamsted	
86	Moseley House-Farm	Moseley House-Farm	February 17, 1984 (#84001077)	538 Greenwoods Road; 42°00′23″N 73°14′29″W	Norfolk	Known as Blackberry River Inn; original part built in 1763; Colonial Revival expansion in 1920; now a bed-and-breakfast.
87	Moss Hill	Moss Hill	August 2, 1982 (#82004457)	Litchfield Road; 41°58′40″N 73°11′57″W	Norfolk	
88	Mount Riga Ironworks Site	Mount Riga Ironworks Site	December 1, 1994 (#94001417)	South Pond; 42°00′17″N 73°28′06″W	Salisbury	
89	Mount Tom Tower	Mount Tom Tower	December 2, 1993 (#93001247)	Off U.S. Route 202 southeast of Woodville, Mount Tom State Park; 41°41′39″N 73°16′30″W	Litchfield, Morris, and Washington	
90	Mulville House	Mulville House	February 17, 1984 (#84001079)	Mountain Road; 41°59′15″N 73°12′32″W	Norfolk	
91	Music Mountain	Music Mountain	December 18, 1987 (#87001909)	Music Mountain Road; 41°55′12″N 73°19′16″W	Canaan	
92	New Milford Center Historic District	New Milford Center Historic District	June 13, 1986 (#86001255)	Bennett and Elm Streets, Center Cemetery, East, South Main, Mill, and Railroad Streets; 41°34′40″N 73°24′35″W	New Milford	
93	New Preston Hill Historic District	New Preston Hill Historic District	August 26, 1985 (#85001931)	New Preston Hill, Findley, and Gunn Hill Roads; 41°40′28″N 73°22′17″W	Washington	
94	Noble House	Noble House	February 17, 1984 (#84001083)	Highfield Road; 41°59′09″N 73°11′07″W	Norfolk	
95	John Glover Noble House	John Glover Noble House	August 29, 1977 (#77001402)	586 Danbury Road; 41°30′17″N 73°25′09″W	New Milford	
96	Norfolk Country Club House	Norfolk Country Club House	August 2, 1982 (#82004458)	50 Golf Drive; 41°59′00″N 73°12′57″W	Norfolk	
97	Norfolk Downs Shelter	Norfolk Downs Shelter	February 22, 1984 (#84001085)	Golf Drive; 41°58′52″N 73°12′58″W	Norfolk	
98	Norfolk Historic District	Norfolk Historic District	October 15, 1979 (#79003749)	U.S. Route 44 and CT 272; 41°59′20″N 73°12′16″W	Norfolk	
99	Northfield Knife Company Site	Northfield Knife Company Site	April 8, 1997 (#97000275)	Knife Shop Road; 41°41′56″N 73°06′12″W	Litchfield	
100	Old Riverton Inn	Old Riverton Inn	July 24, 1992 (#92000906)	436 East River Road; 41°57′46″N 73°01′01″W	Barkhamsted	
101	James Pardee House	James Pardee House	August 28, 2003 (#03000813)	129 North Main Street; 41°53′00″N 73°28′20″W	Sharon	
102	Paugnut Forest Administration Building	Paugnut Forest Administration Building	September 5, 1986 (#86001736)	385 Burr Mountain Road, Burr Pond State Park; 41°52′13″N 73°05′34″W	Torrington	
103	Peoples Forest Museum	Peoples Forest Museum	September 4, 1986 (#86001737)	Greenwood Road, Peoples State Forest; 41°55′31″N 72°59′50″W	Barkhamsted	
104	Phelps Farms Historic District	Phelps Farms Historic District	August 18, 1983 (#83001249)	CT 183 and Prock Hill Road; 42°01′03″N 73°06′39″W	Colebrook	
105	Arah Phelps Inn	Arah Phelps Inn	August 5, 1971 (#71000905)	Junction of Prock Hill Road and CT 183; 42°01′03″N 73°06′54″W	Colebrook	
106	Pine Meadow Historic District	Pine Meadow Historic District	December 6, 1996 (#96001463)	Roughly bounded by the Farmington River, Wicket, North Ten, Church and Main Streets, Village of Pine Meadow; 41°52′37″N 72°58′00″W	New Hartford	
107	Plymouth Center Historic District	Plymouth Center Historic District	July 22, 1999 (#99000858)	Roughly along Main, North, and South Streets, Cater, Hillside Avenue, Ives Crossing, and Maple Street; 41°40′18″N 73°03′15″W	Plymouth	
108	Rectory and Church of the Immaculate Conception	Rectory and Church of the Immaculate Conception	August 2, 1982 (#82004459)	4 North Street; 41°59′40″N 73°12′07″W	Norfolk	
109	Red Mountain Shelter	Red Mountain Shelter	September 4, 1986 (#86001740)	North Side of CT 4 in Mohawk State Forest; 41°50′50″N 73°17′15″W	Cornwall	
110	Tapping Reeve House and Law School	Tapping Reeve House and Law School	October 15, 1966 (#66000879)	South Street; 41°44′38″N 73°11′20″W	Litchfield	First law school in the United States separate from a college or university, its influential graduates included Aaron Burr Jr. and John C. Calhoun.
111	Reynolds Bridge	Reynolds Bridge	September 29, 2004 (#04001095)	Waterbury Road at the Naugatuck River; 41°39′11″N 73°04′39″W	Thomaston	An open-spandrel concrete arch bridge from 1928
112	Riverton Historic District	Riverton Historic District	May 15, 2007 (#07000419)	Roughly bounded by the Still River and the Farmington River and East River Road; 41°57′46″N 73°01′00″W	Barkhamsted	
113	Rock Hall	Rock Hall	July 22, 2010 (#10000495)	19 Rock Hall Road; 41°59′02″N 73°08′11″W	Colebrook	
114	Rockwell House	Rockwell House	August 2, 1982 (#82004460)	Laurel Way; 41°59′36″N 73°11′33″W	Norfolk	
115	Solomon Rockwell House	Solomon Rockwell House	July 15, 1977 (#77001500)	226 Prospect Street; 41°55′26″N 73°04′44″W	Winchester*	
116	Roxbury Center	Roxbury Center	July 28, 1983 (#83001271)	CT 67, Weller's Bridge Road, South and Church Streets; 41°33′20″N 73°18′28″W	Roxbury	
117	Roxbury Iron Mine and Furnace Complex	Roxbury Iron Mine and Furnace Complex	June 24, 1979 (#79002621)	Mine Hill Road; 41°33′25″N 73°20′17″W	Roxbury	
118	Rumsey Hall	Rumsey Hall	May 10, 1990 (#90000762)	12 Bolton Hill Road; 41°50′40″N 73°19′55″W	Cornwall	Demolished in 2010.
119	Rye House	Rye House	August 10, 2000 (#00000940)	122-132 Old Mount Tom Road; 41°43′10″N 73°16′39″W	Litchfield	
120	St. Andrew's Episcopal Church	St. Andrew's Episcopal Church	December 9, 1994 (#94001443)	247 New Milford Turnpike; 41°39′46″N 73°22′10″W	Washington	
121	Salisbury Center Historic District	Salisbury Center Historic District	September 11, 1997 (#97001115)	Roughly along Academy, East Main, Factory, and Main Streets, and 15 Underwood Road; 41°58′58″N 73°25′25″W	Salisbury	
122	Frederick S. Sanford House	Frederick S. Sanford House	January 19, 1989 (#88003230)	Hat Shop Hill Road; 41°32′07″N 73°22′24″W	Bridgewater	
123	Carl F. Schoverling Tobacco Warehouse	Carl F. Schoverling Tobacco Warehouse	April 12, 1982 (#82004446)	1 Wellsville Avenue; 41°34′50″N 73°25′00″W	New Milford	
124	Scoville Memorial Library	Scoville Memorial Library	April 29, 1982 (#82004473)	Main Street; 41°58′51″N 73°25′23″W	Salisbury	
125	Scoville Powerhouse	Scoville Powerhouse	February 16, 1984 (#84001087)	Twin Lakes and Beaver Dam Roads; 42°01′52″N 73°24′39″W	Salisbury	
126	Maj. Gen. John Sedgwick House	Maj. Gen. John Sedgwick House	April 8, 1992 (#92000262)	52 Hautboy Hill Road; 41°53′55″N 73°16′27″W	Cornwall	
127	Sharon Historic District	Sharon Historic District	April 15, 1993 (#93000257)	Roughly Main Street from Low Road to its junction with Mitchelltown, Amenia Union, and West Woods Roads; 41°52′13″N 73°28′45″W	Sharon	
128	Sharon Valley Historic District	Sharon Valley Historic District	September 9, 1982 (#82004478)	Junction of Sharon Valley and Sharon Station Roads; 41°52′58″N 73°29′43″W	Sharon	Hamlet that grew up around 19th-century iron mining and refining operation; first industrial community in Sharon
129	John Shepard House	John Shepard House	August 2, 1982 (#82004462)	Shepard Park Road; 41°59′41″N 73°11′47″W	Norfolk	
130	David Sherman House	David Sherman House	August 23, 2002 (#02000868)	Middle Quarter Road; 41°31′41″N 73°12′02″W	Woodbury	
131	Skee's Diner	Skee's Diner	September 6, 2002 (#02000912)	Moved from 589 Main Street and currently in undisclosed location to begin restoration. 41°48′45″N 73°07′21″W	Torrington	Barrel-roofed diner, prominently located at Main and Elm. Moved into place in 1944, escaping a war-time moratorium on new construction.
132	Skilton Road Bridge	Skilton Road Bridge	December 10, 1991 (#91001744)	Skilton Road over the Nonewaug River; 41°37′45″N 73°09′33″W	Watertown	
133	Jason Skinner House	Jason Skinner House	June 19, 1985 (#85001331)	21 Wintergreen Circle; 41°45′58″N 73°04′15″W	Harwinton	
134	South Canaan Congregational Church	South Canaan Congregational Church	March 16, 1983 (#83001272)	CT 63 and Barnes Road; 41°57′42″N 73°20′07″W	Canaan	
135	South School	South School	March 27, 1986 (#86000522)	362 South Main Street; 41°47′36″N 73°07′17″W	Torrington	1915 school designed by Wilson Potter, a New York City-based architect of schools throughout the northeast
136	Southbury Training School	Southbury Training School	May 1, 1992 (#92000368)	1461 South Britain Road; 41°27′49″N 73°16′23″W	Roxbury	Residential facility built in the 1930s for adults with intellectual disabilities; 125 primarily brick institutional Georgian and Colonial Revival buildings. Extends into Southbury in New Haven County.
137	Sports Building	Sports Building	February 22, 1984 (#84001088)	Windrow Road; 41°58′22″N 73°13′13″W	Norfolk	
138	Steward's House-Foreign Mission School	Steward's House-Foreign Mission School	October 31, 2016 (#16000858)	14 Bolton Hill Road; 41°50′40″N 73°19′57″W	Cornwall	Remaining building from missionary training school for Native Americans, Native Hawaiians and others. Notable students include Henry Opukahaia, John Ridge, and Elias Boudinot.
139	Robbins Stoeckel House	Robbins Stoeckel House	August 2, 1982 (#82004465)	Litchfield Road; 41°59′02″N 73°12′03″W	Norfolk	
140	Sun Terrace	Sun Terrace	December 20, 1978 (#78002849)	Stub Hollow Road; 41°51′15″N 73°00′47″W	New Hartford	
141	Sunny Ridge Historic District	Sunny Ridge Historic District	November 22, 1995 (#95001346)	2 and 20 Nettleton Hollow Road, 145 Old Litchfield Road, 6 Romford Road, and 10-32 Sunny Ridge Road; 41°39′27″N 73°16′36″W	Washington	
142	Tamarack Lodge Bungalow	Tamarack Lodge Bungalow	September 16, 1977 (#77001499)	South of Norfolk off CT 272 at Dennis Hill Park; 41°56′55″N 73°11′58″W	Norfolk	
143	Terryville Waterwheel	Terryville Waterwheel	January 4, 2002 (#01001412)	262 Main Street; 41°40′48″N 73°00′55″W	Plymouth	
144	Thomaston Opera House	Thomaston Opera House	April 26, 1972 (#72001319)	153 Main Street; 41°40′23″N 73°04′32″W	Thomaston	Building from 1883
145	Tom Thumb House	Tom Thumb House	February 22, 1984 (#84001094)	Windrow Road; 41°58′14″N 73°13′10″W	Norfolk	
146	Topsmead	Topsmead	November 19, 1993 (#93001243)	25 and 46 Chase Road; 41°44′49″N 73°09′30″W	Litchfield	
147	Torringford Street Historic District	Torringford Street Historic District	July 31, 1991 (#91000991)	Torringford Street from Main Street North to West Hill Road; 41°50′45″N 73°04′27″W	Torrington	
148	Torrington Fire Department Headquarters	Torrington Fire Department Headquarters	December 31, 1987 (#87002185)	117 Water Street; 41°48′06″N 73°07′29″W	Torrington	
149	Town Hall and District School No. 6	Town Hall and District School No. 6	November 30, 1987 (#87002109)	12 South Street; 41°40′57″N 73°11′59″W	Morris	
150	Trinity Church	Trinity Church	April 23, 1976 (#76001981)	Milton Road; 41°46′13″N 73°16′03″W	Litchfield	
151	Trinity Church	Trinity Church	August 1, 1984 (#84001097)	160 Main Street; 41°40′21″N 73°04′32″W	Thomaston	
152	Union Church/St. Paul's Church	Union Church/St. Paul's Church	February 21, 1985 (#85000307)	3 Robertsville Road; 41°57′44″N 73°01′13″W	Barkhamsted	
153	Union Depot	Union Depot	April 26, 1972 (#72001317)	U.S. Route 44; 42°01′34″N 73°19′48″W	North Canaan	
154	United Bank Building	United Bank Building	April 12, 1982 (#82004447)	19-21 Main Street; 41°34′38″N 73°24′42″W	New Milford	
155	Villa Friuli	Villa Friuli	April 11, 1991 (#91000349)	58 High Street; 41°48′11″N 73°07′54″W	Torrington	
156	Warner Theatre	Warner Theatre	February 16, 1984 (#84001098)	68-82 Main Street; 41°48′06″N 73°07′17″W	Torrington	
157	Warren Congregational Church	Warren Congregational Church	November 29, 1991 (#91001743)	4 Sackett Hill Road; 41°44′37″N 73°20′58″W	Warren	
158	Warrenton Woolen Mill	Warrenton Woolen Mill	February 12, 1987 (#87000115)	839 Main Street; 41°49′06″N 73°07′25″W	Torrington	
159	Washington Green Historic District	Washington Green Historic District	November 27, 1995 (#95001345)	Roughly along Ferry Bridge, Green Hill, Kirby, Roxbury, Wykeham and Woodbury Roadsa, Parsonage Lane, and The Green; 41°37′37″N 73°18′28″W	Washington	
160	Water Street Historic District	Water Street Historic District	January 15, 2003 (#02001698)	Roughly along Water Street, from Church Street to Prospect Street; 41°48′09″N 73°07′35″W	Torrington	
161	Watertown Center Historic District	Watertown Center Historic District	April 12, 2001 (#01000352)	Roughly along Deforest, Main, Woodruff, Woodbury, North, and Warren Streets; 41°36′14″N 73°07′11″W	Watertown	
162	Webutuck Agricultural Valley Historic District		September 30, 2024 (#100009322)	Leedsville, Amenia Union, South Amenia, and Kent Roads in NY; Amenia Union and Knibloe Hill Roads in CT; 41°49′27″N 73°30′20″W	Sharon vicinity	Extends into Dutchess County, New York.
163	David Welch House	David Welch House	February 16, 1984 (#84001103)	Potash and Milton Roads; 41°46′13″N 73°15′59″W	Litchfield	
164	West Cornwall Covered Bridge	West Cornwall Covered Bridge	December 30, 1975 (#75001923)	CT 128 at the Housatonic River; 41°52′18″N 73°21′52″W	Cornwall	
165	West End Historic District	West End Historic District	August 3, 1990 (#90001148)	North Side of Main Street between Union and Elm Streets; 41°55′15″N 73°04′18″W	Winchester*	
166	West Goshen Historic District	West Goshen Historic District	October 23, 1987 (#87000982)	Roughly bounded by CT 4, Beach, Mill and Milton Streets, and Thompson Road; 41°49′32″N 73°15′16″W	Goshen	
167	E. A. Wildman & Co. Tobacco Warehouse	E. A. Wildman & Co. Tobacco Warehouse	October 20, 1988 (#88000731)	34 Bridge Street; 41°34′35″N 73°24′43″W	New Milford	
168	Warham Williams House	Warham Williams House	March 11, 1971 (#71000915)	41°23′33″N 72°47′31″W	Roxbury	Moved from Northford, Connecticut in 1978.
169	Winchester Soldiers' Monument	Winchester Soldiers' Monument	January 26, 1984 (#84001105)	Crown Street; 41°55′29″N 73°04′22″W	Winchester*	
170	Winsted Green Historic District	Winsted Green Historic District	August 16, 1977 (#77001501)	U.S. Route 44 and CT 8; also 86 Main Street; 41°55′19″N 73°03′39″W	Winchester*	Second address represents boundary increase added on April 29, 1982
171	Winsted Hosiery Mill	Winsted Hosiery Mill	February 21, 1985 (#85000308)	Whiting at Holabird Street; 41°55′24″N 73°03′32″W	Winchester*	
172	Winsted Water Works		November 20, 2020 (#100005797)	Winchester Road (north side), Old Waterbury Turnpike / Rugg Brook Road; 41°54′48″N 73°07′30″W	Winchester	
173	Oliver Wolcott House	Oliver Wolcott House	November 11, 1971 (#71001011)	South Street; 41°44′38″N 73°11′09″W	Litchfield	1753-built home of Oliver Wolcott Sr., the soldier and politician, a signer of the U.S. Declaration of Independence and the Articles of Confederation
174	Woodbury Historic District No. 1	Woodbury Historic District No. 1	March 11, 1971 (#71000908)	Both sides of Main Street (U.S. Route 6) for 2 miles (3.2 km), and radiating roads 41°32′43″N 73°12′23″W	Woodbury	
175	Woodbury Historic District No. 2	Woodbury Historic District No. 2	February 23, 1972 (#72001326)	Both sides of Main Street from Woodbury–Southbury Town line to Middle Quarter Road; 41°30′56″N 73°12′17″W	Woodbury	
176	World War I Memorial	World War I Memorial	February 17, 1984 (#84001106)	Greenwoods Road West and North Streets; 41°59′40″N 73°12′10″W	Norfolk	

*Addresses of listed places in Winchester are "Winsted, CT"

== See also ==
- List of National Historic Landmarks in Connecticut
- National Register of Historic Places listings in Connecticut
