= Norfolk Downs Shelter =

- U.S. National Register of Historic Places
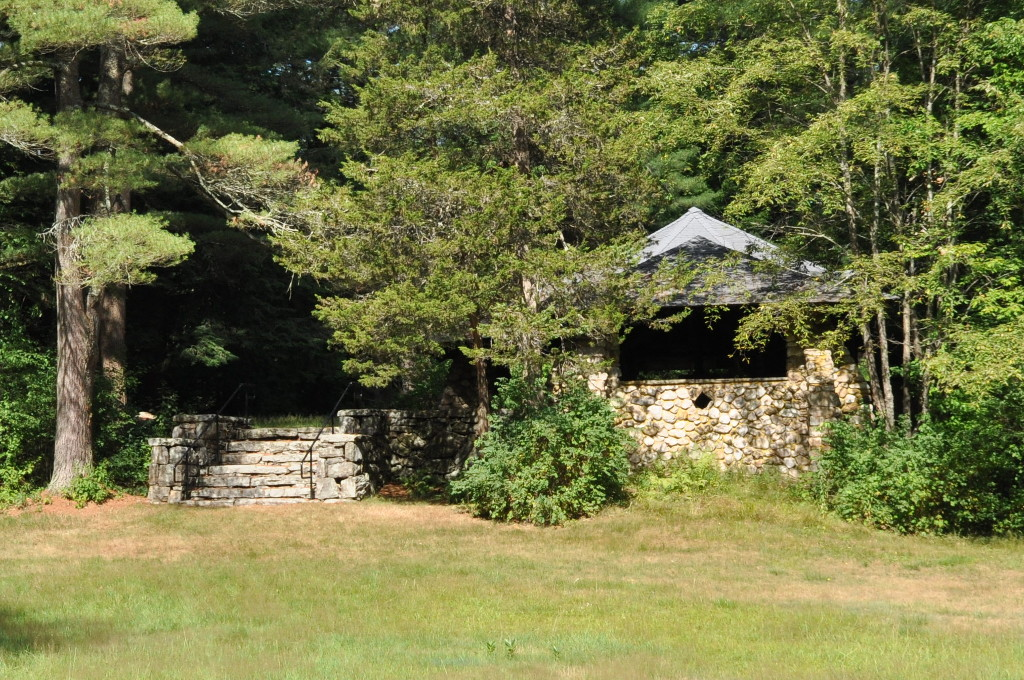

- Location within Connecticut Location within the United States
- Location: Golf Drive, Norfolk, Connecticut
- Coordinates: 41°58′52″N 73°12′58″W
- Area: 0.5 acres (0.20 ha)
- Built: 1907
- Architect: Taylor & Levi
- MPS: Taylor, Alfredo S. G., TR
- NRHP reference No.: 84001085
- Added to NRHP: February 22, 1984

The Norfolk Downs Shelter is a historic former golf club pavilion on Golf Drive in Norfolk, Connecticut. It was built in 1907 for a now-abandoned nine-hole golf course known as Norfolk Downs, to design by New York City architect Alfredo S.G. Taylor. It was listed on the National Register of Historic Places in 1984 for its association with the architect.

== Description and history ==
The Norfolk Downs Shelter stands on the eastern edge of a large parcel of land south of the Norfolk Curling Club and Norfolk Country Club, southwest of the village center of Norfolk. The land is now mostly wooded, with some open areas, including between it and the road. The structure is a single story in height, with a central octagonal section flanked by uncovered rectangular wings. The central portion is covered by a low-pitch octagonal roof. The walls are built out of rubblestone, as is the chimney on the north side of the center. Access to the shelter is via wide steps facing east on the southern flanking terrace. The building was once enclosed with glass windows, but those and its interior fixtures have been removed. In the interior the roughly finished undressed rafters of the roof are visible.

The Norfolk Downs golf course was a public nine-hole course established in 1897 by the Eldridge sisters. This pavilion was designed for them in 1907 by Alfredo S.G. Taylor, a New York-based architect who spent many summers in Norfolk, and designed more than thirty buildings there. The Eldridge sisters objected to the use of the facility on Sundays (the Sabbath), which prompted other citizens to form the adjacent (and private) Norfolk Country Club. Attempts to merge the two nine-hole courses into a single eighteen-hole course were unsuccessful, and the Downs was eventually abandoned. The surviving pavilion is seen as an architectural predecessor to the Tamarack Lodge Bungalow, another Taylor work in Norfolk.

== See also ==
- National Register of Historic Places listings in Litchfield County, Connecticut
