= Childs Sports Building =

- Sports Building
- U.S. National Register of Historic Places
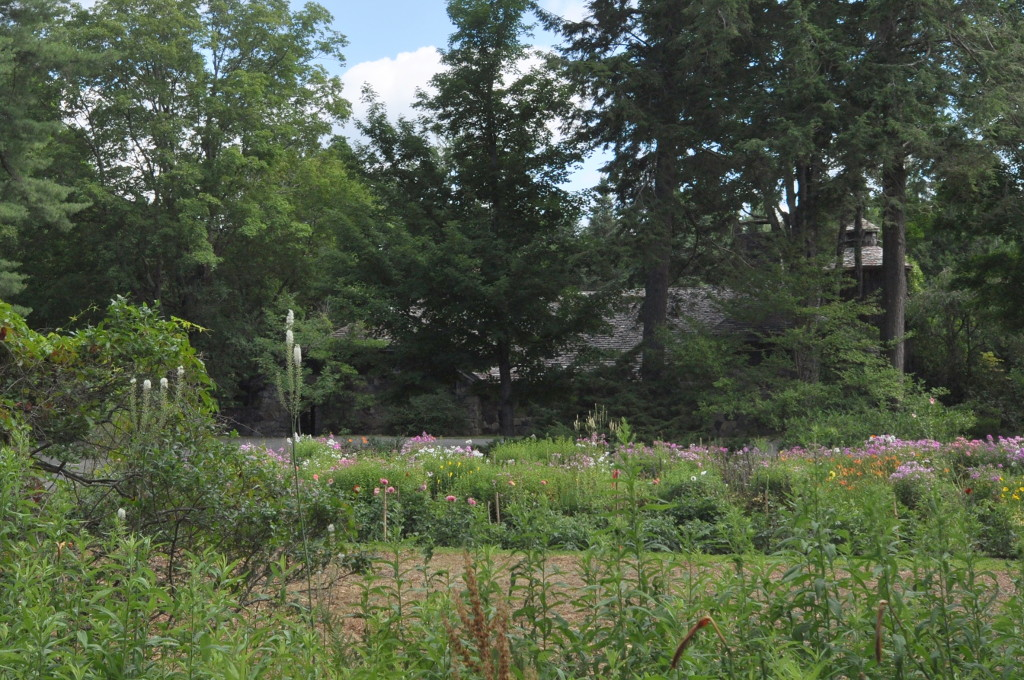

- Location within Connecticut Location within the United States
- Location: Windrow Road, Norfolk, Connecticut
- Coordinates: 41°58′22″N 73°13′13″W
- Area: 0.3 acres (0.12 ha)
- Built: 1930
- Architect: Taylor & Levi
- Architectural style: Medieval Revival
- MPS: Taylor, Alfredo S. G., TR
- NRHP reference No.: 84001088
- Added to NRHP: February 22, 1984

The Childs Sports Building is a historic private recreational sports facility on Windrow Road in Norfolk, Connecticut. Built in 1930, it is an architecturally distinctive stone building with medieval features, designed by Alfredo S.G. Taylor. It was listed on the National Register of Historic Places in 1984.

== Description and history ==
The Childs Sports Building is located in a rural-residential setting south of the village center of Norfolk, on the north side of Windrow Road near its junction with Gamefield Road. This area is part of what was once a large country estate of the Childs family. The building is a 1 1/2-story masonry structure, built out of rough fieldstone and capped by a roof with clipped gables. It is roughly rectangular in plan, with a round turret rising at its northeast corner to a low-pitch conical roof. The interior and roof framing are done with massive timbers recycled from old barns, which were also the source of the rough planking on the interior walls. The ground floor offers indoor courts for playing squash, badminton, and fives, as well as men's and women's dressing rooms. The upper level has a trophy hall and a billiard room.

The building was built in 1930 to a design by New York City architect Alfredo S.G. Taylor. Taylor spent many summers in Norfolk, and is credited with more than thirty commissions in the community. A number of them share the medieval features used in this building: the rough rustic stone and wood finishes, and heavy slate roof. Details of the building were published in American Architect and Building News after its construction. Taylor's work for the Childs family also included the Starling Childs Camp on Doolittle Lake, and the Tom Thumb House.

== See also ==
- National Register of Historic Places listings in Litchfield County, Connecticut
