= Campbell Park (disambiguation) =

Campbell Park is a district and central park in Milton Keynes, Buckinghamshire, England.

Campbell Park may also refer to:

- Campbell Park Cricket Ground in the above park
- Campbell Park (civil parish) is a civil parish in the Borough of Milton Keynes (despite its name, it does not contain the park district)
- Campbell Park, Canberra, which together with Russell Offices, is the Headquarters of the Australian Defence Force
- Campbell Falls State Park Reserve, in the United States is sometimes abbreviated to "Campbell Park"
