= Noble House (Norfolk, Connecticut) =

Historic house in Connecticut, United States

- U.S. National Register of Historic Places
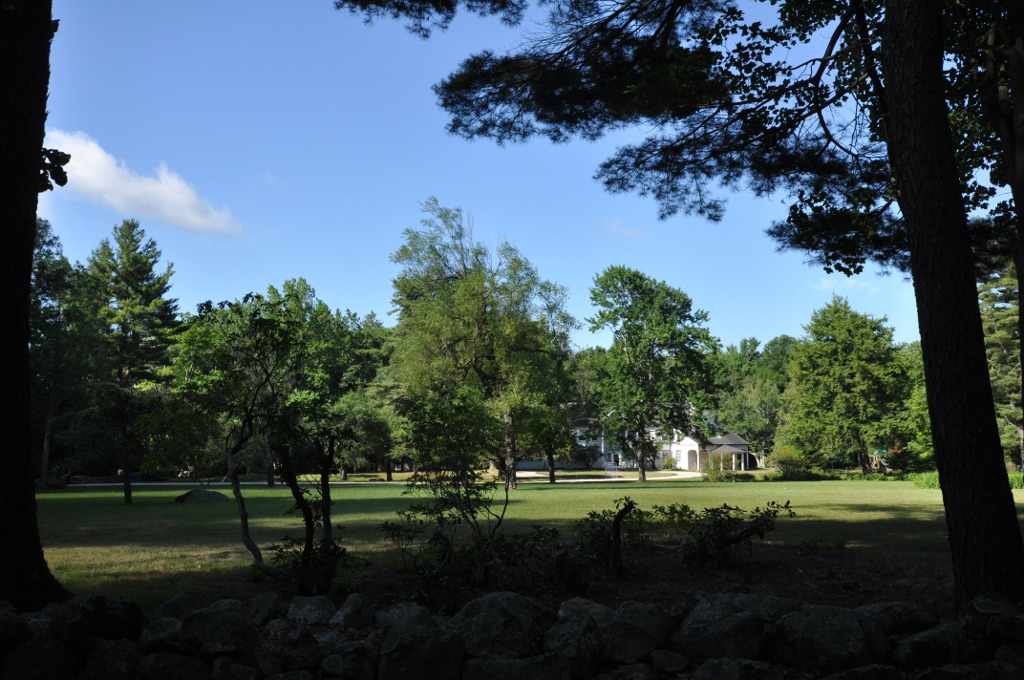

- Location within Connecticut Location within the United States
- Location: Highfield Road, Norfolk, Connecticut
- Coordinates: 41°59′9″N 73°11′7″W
- Area: 3 acres (1.2 ha)
- Built: 1919
- Architect: Taylor & Levi
- Architectural style: Colonial Revival, Georgian Revival
- MPS: Taylor, Alfredo S. G., TR
- NRHP reference No.: 84001083
- Added to NRHP: February 17, 1984

The Noble House is a historic house on Highfield Road in Norfolk, Connecticut. Built in 1919, it is a prominent example of Georgian Revival architecture by the noted New York City architect Alfredo S.G. Taylor. It was listed on the National Register of Historic Places in 1984.

== Description and history ==
The Low House stands in a small residential area east of Norfolk's village center, down a private lane extending south from Laurel Way Extension. Set on an expansive landscaped property, it is a sprawling 2 1/2-story wood-frame structure with Georgian Revival features. Its main portion has two gable-roofed sections set at right angles, joined by an angled porch section to the northeast and a two-story three-by-three section to the southwest, which give the building a roughly rectangular shape. The ground level openings of the porch area have a signature Taylor elements, segmented-arch tops. The northeast angled section has an eyebrow dormer in the roof, and has the main entrance under a two-story portico supported by slender columns. The property also includes a period chauffeur's house.

The house was built in 1919; it was designed by Alfredo S.G. Taylor, a New York City architect and a principal of the firm Levi and Taylor. Taylor summered in Norfolk, where he is credited with designing more than thirty buildings, many of them summer properties. This house is the largest and most elaborate of Taylor's Georgian Revival designs in Norfolk.

== See also ==
- Low House (Norfolk, Connecticut), next door, also a Taylor Georgian Revival design
- National Register of Historic Places listings in Litchfield County, Connecticut
