= John Shepard House =

Historic house in Connecticut, United States

- U.S. National Register of Historic Places
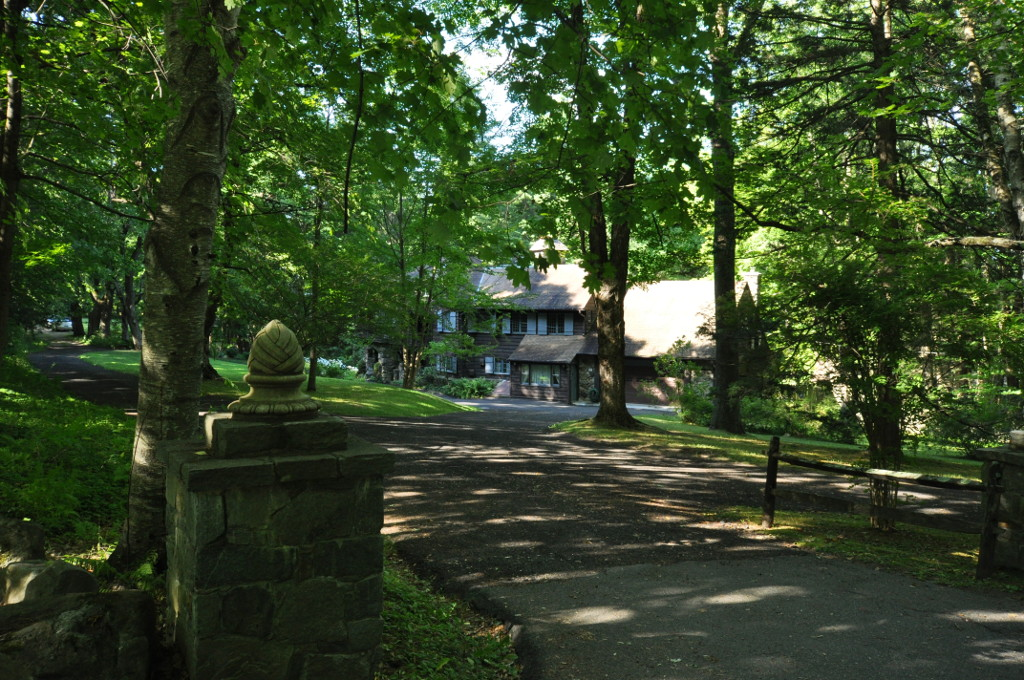

- Location within Connecticut Location within the United States
- Location: Shepard Park Road, Norfolk, Connecticut
- Coordinates: 41°59′41″N 73°11′47″W
- Area: 1 acre (0.40 ha)
- Built: 1922
- Architect: Taylor, Alfredo S.G.
- MPS: Taylor, Alfredo S. G., TR
- NRHP reference No.: 82004462
- Added to NRHP: August 2, 1982

The John Shepard House is a historic house on Shepard Park Road in Norfolk, Connecticut. Built in 1922, it is one of more than thirty architecturally distinguished houses built in Norfolk to designs by Alfredo S.G. Taylor. It was listed on the National Register of Historic Places in 1982.

== Description and history ==
The John Shepard House is located in a residential area on the north side of Norfolk village. It is set on the south side of Shepard Road, roughly midway between Mills Lane and Maple Avenue. It is a sprawling 2 1/2-story structure, built mainly of rubblestone, with a central rectangular section flanked by wings set at an angle. The style roughly resembles that of a Swiss chateau, with heavy dark chestnut clapboards and a recessed porch with balcony above. The roof has a shallow pitch, and is pierced by truncated gable dormers. Windows are irregular in size and spacing, and are typically fitted with small panes. The interior is divided into public spaces in the center and north wing ground floors, bedrooms above those, and the service and servants wing to the south.

The house was built in 1922, and was one of the later commissions in Norfolk of New York City architect Alfredo S.G. Taylor. Taylor spent many summers in Norfolk in the early 20th century, and is credited with more than thirty commissions. This house includes a number of his signature features, including the use of rustic stone and heavy woodwork, and the angled wings, all of which appear on a number of his works.

== See also ==
- National Register of Historic Places listings in Litchfield County, Connecticut
