= Mead Camp =

Historic house in Connecticut, United States

- U.S. National Register of Historic Places
- Location within Connecticut Location within the United States
- Location: Doolittle Lake, Norfolk, Connecticut
- Coordinates: 42°0′44″N 73°9′46″W
- Area: 3 acres (1.2 ha)
- Built: 1930
- Architect: Taylor, Alfredo S.G.
- MPS: Taylor, Alfredo S. G., TR
- NRHP reference No.: 82004455
- Added to NRHP: August 2, 1982

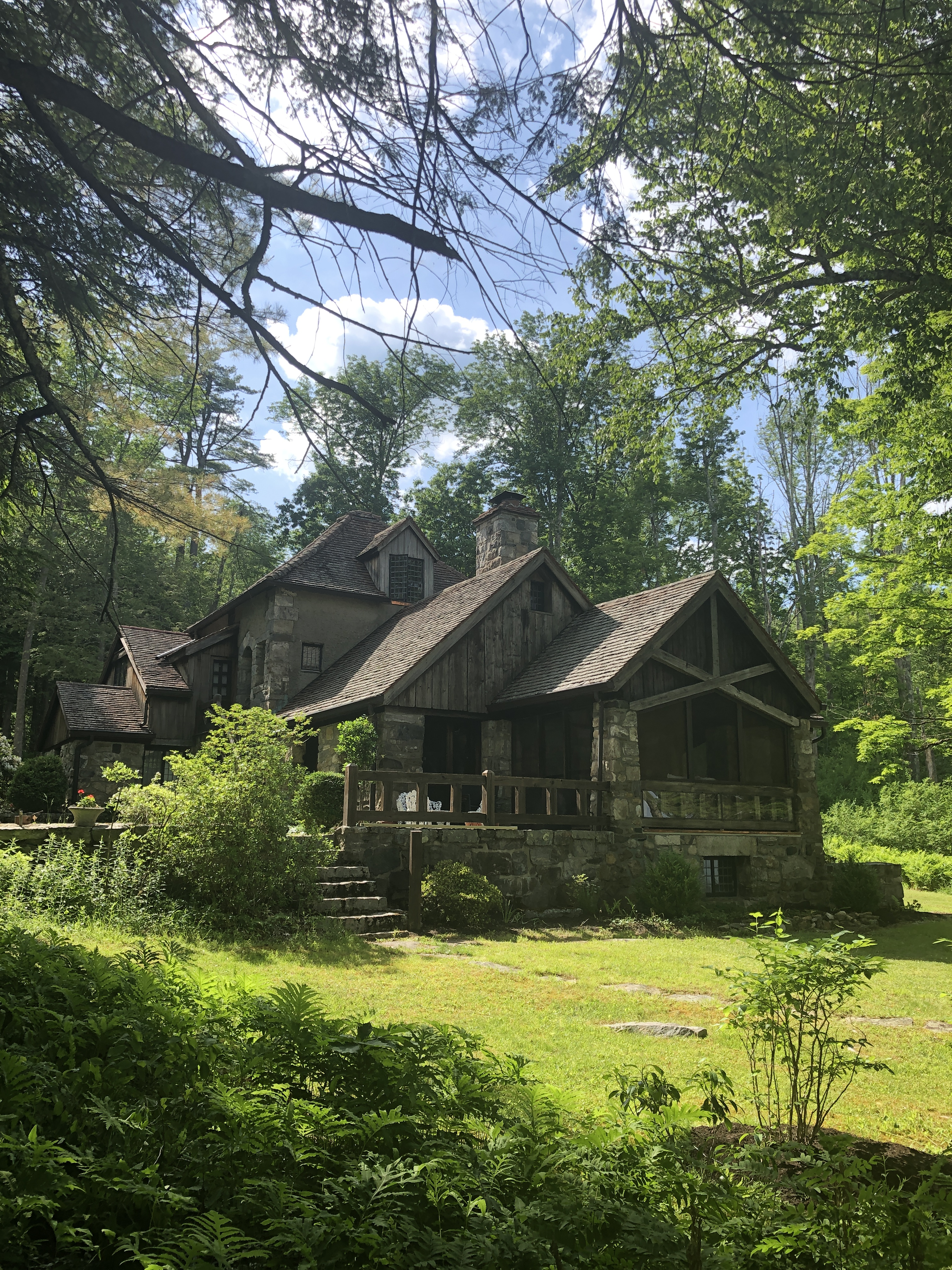
Mead Camp

The Mead Camp is a historic summer house on the shore of Doolittle Lake in northeastern Norfolk, Connecticut. It was built in 1930 to a design by New York architect Alfredo S.G. Taylor, and is one of the most substantial of his summer house designs. It was listed on the National Register of Historic Places in 1982.

== Description and history ==
The Mead Camp is located at the southwestern end of Doolittle Lake, an exclusive summer retreat area in rural northeastern Norfolk. Tower Hill Road, a private lane, provides access to this and several other private summer properties that face the lake. The Mead Camp main house is a 2 1/2-story structure, finished in stone and stucco. It is oriented with its long side facing the lake, and has a main block with a series of extensions to the south that reduce in width and height, ending in a covered porch with stone posts. Its most distinctive feature is a three-story stone tower, with a hip roof topped by a pyramidal roof.

The land on which the camp stands was originally part of a large landholding of the Benedict family, prominent farmers in northern Norfolk. In the late 19th century this area began to be developed as a summer resort area after the railroad arrived in Norfolk in 1871, and Doolittle Lake was developed as a colony of exclusive private retreats. This camp was built in 1930 for Grace Hartley Jenkins Mead, a philanthropist and trustee emeritus of Columbia University's Teachers College to a design by Alfredo S.G. Taylor, an architect based in New York City who summered in Norfolk. Taylor is credited with the design of more than thirty distinctive buildings in Norfolk. He designed six camps in the Doolittle Lake area, of which this is one of the most substantial.

== See also ==
- National Register of Historic Places listings in Litchfield County, Connecticut
