= Starling Childs Camp =

Historic cottage

- U.S. National Register of Historic Places
- Location within Connecticut Location within the United States
- Location: Doolittle Lake, Norfolk, Connecticut
- Coordinates: 42°0′40″N 73°9′23″W
- Area: less than one acre
- Built: 1923
- Architect: Taylor, Alfredo S.G.
- MPS: Taylor, Alfredo S. G., TR
- NRHP reference No.: 82004463
- Added to NRHP: August 2, 1982

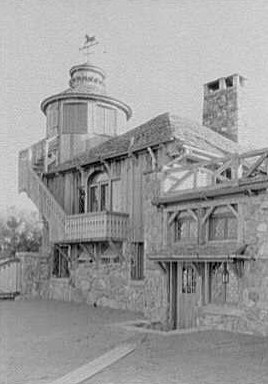

The Starling Childs Camp is a historic cottage on the south shore of Doolittle Lake in Norfolk, Connecticut. Built in 1923, it is significant as an idiosyncratic design of architect Alfredo S.G. Taylor. It was listed on the U.S. National Register of Historic Places in 1982, for its association with the architect.

== Description and history ==
The Starling Childs Camp is located at the southern end of Doolittle Lake, an exclusive summer retreat area. Deerfield Road provides access to this and several other private summer properties that face the lake. The camp's main house is a 1 1/2-story frame structure set on a full-height rubble fieldstone foundation. The lake-front facade has rounded-arch openings in the basement level, one of which houses the main entrance. The upper level has a broad gable end, with a porch extending across much of the width, adorned by a pierced balustrade. Side-facing stairs provide outside access from the porch level to the ground on the right side of the facade.

The land on which the camp stands was part of a large landholding of the Benedict family, prominent farmers in northern Norfolk. In the late 19th century this area began to be developed as a summer resort area after the railroad arrived in Norfolk in 1871, and Doolittle Lake was developed as a colony of exclusive private retreats. The Childs camp was built in 1923, to a design by Alfredo S.G. Taylor, a New York City-based architect who summered in Norfolk, and eventually designed a significant number of buildings in the town. Six of Taylor's designs were for camps on Doolittle Lake, all of which exhibit the rustic elements exhibited by this one. Taylor also executed a number of other designs for the Childs family in Norfolk, including the Childs Sports Building and the Tom Thumb House.

== See also ==
- National Register of Historic Places listings in Litchfield County, Connecticut
