= Mulville House =

Historic house in Connecticut, United States

- U.S. National Register of Historic Places
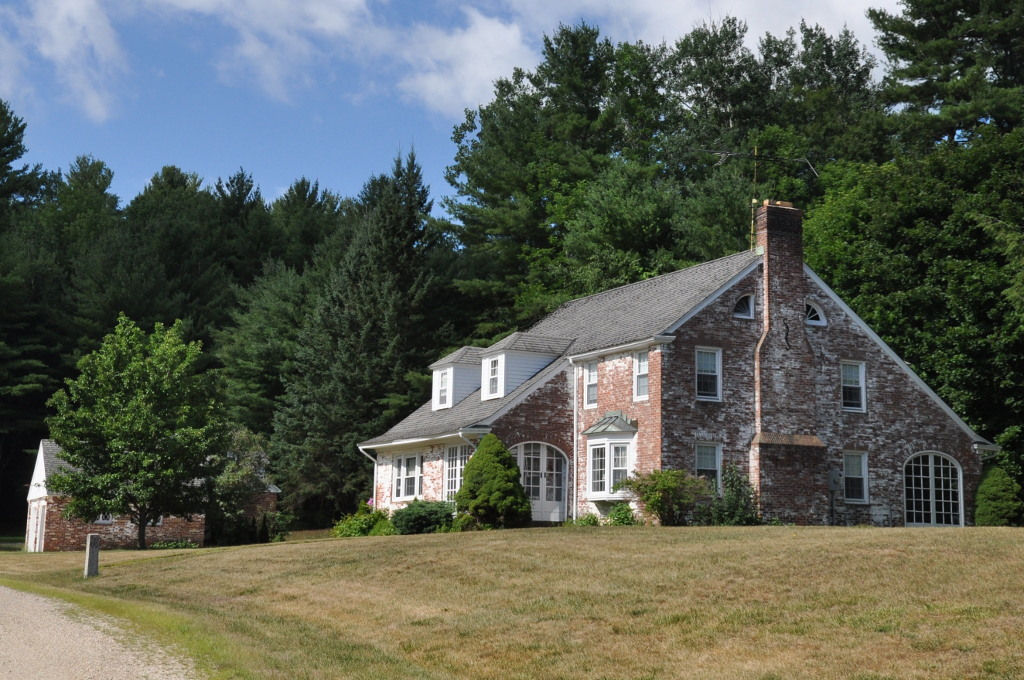

- Location within Connecticut Location within the United States
- Location: Mountain Road, Norfolk, Connecticut
- Coordinates: 41°59′15″N 73°12′32″W
- Area: 6 acres (2.4 ha)
- Built: 1931
- Architect: Taylor & Levi
- Architectural style: Colonial Revival, Georgian Revival
- MPS: Taylor, Alfredo S. G., TR
- NRHP reference No.: 84001079
- Added to NRHP: February 17, 1984

The Mulville House is a historic house on Mountain Road in Norfolk, Connecticut. Built in 1931, it is unique among the Norfolk designs of New York City architect Alfredo S.G. Taylor in that it is executed in brick. It is a good example of Georgian Revival architecture with some of Taylor's signature elements. It was listed on the National Register of Historic Places in 1984.

== Description and history ==
The Mulville House is located southwest of the village center of Norfolk, on the south side of Mountain Road just west of its junction with West Road. It is a 2 1/2-story brick building, with a gabled roof oriented perpendicular to the road and the main facade facing east. It basically has a saltbox profile, with the roof extending to the first floor in the rear, but there is a projecting section on the front of the house that also extends the roof slope to the first floor. Facing the street there are two broad segmented-arch doorways, one in the saltbox end and one on the front projecting. Hip-roofed wood-frame dormers project from both roof faces. The property also includes a garage, also built of brick; its windows feature small diamond panes.

The house was built in 1931 to a design by New York architect Alfredo S.G. Taylor, who summered in Norfolk for many years, and is credited with more than thirty commissions in the community. The unusual choice of building material for a work by Taylor was probably prompted by the client, who was a masonry contractor. The house was originally painted with white paint designed to wear off, leaving the mottled pattern seen today.

== See also ==
- National Register of Historic Places listings in Litchfield County, Connecticut
