= Robbins Stoeckel House =

Historic house in Connecticut, United States

- U.S. National Register of Historic Places
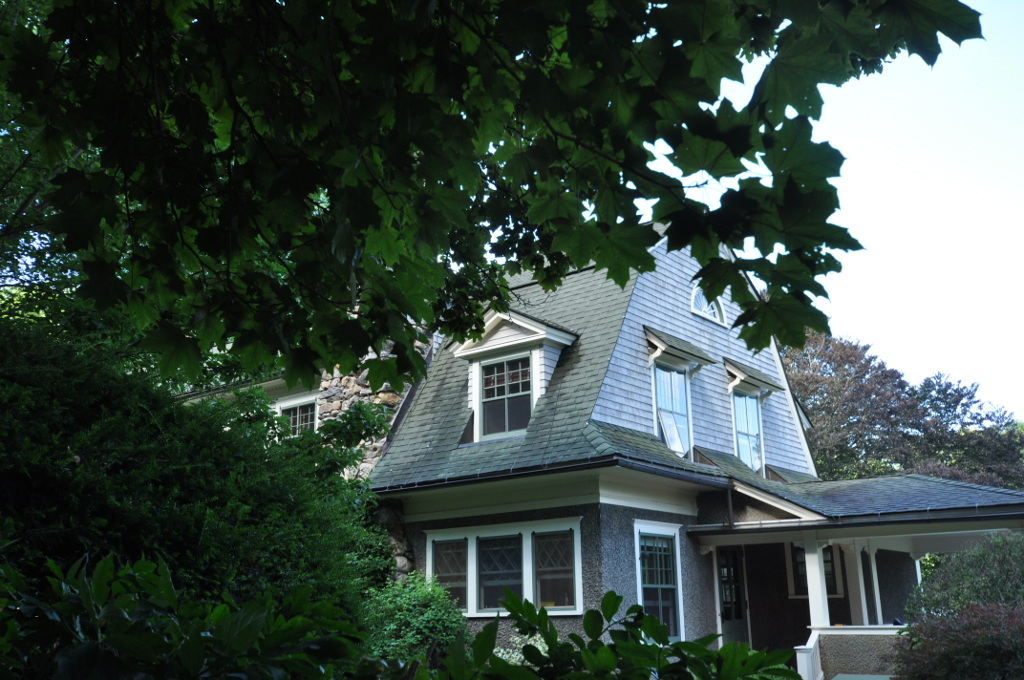

- Location within Connecticut Location within the United States
- Location: Litchfield Road, Norfolk, Connecticut
- Coordinates: 41°59′2″N 73°12′3″W
- Area: 3 acres (1.2 ha)
- Built: 1907
- Architect: Taylor, Alfredo S.G.
- MPS: Taylor, Alfredo S. G., TR
- NRHP reference No.: 82004465
- Added to NRHP: August 2, 1982

The Robbins Stoeckel House is a historic house on Litchfield Road in Norfolk, Connecticut. Built in 1907, it is a distinctive design of the architect Alfredo S.G. Taylor, featuring some of his signature elements. It was listed on the National Register of Historic Places in 1982.

== Description and history ==
The Robbins Stoeckel House stands south of the village center of Norfolk, on the west side of Litchfield Road just south of the Mountain View Inn. It is a 2 1/2-story wood-frame structure, with a dormered gable roof, and an exterior finished in stucco and wooden shingles. A gambrel-roofed ell extends from the north side. A fieldstone chimney rises on the front facade, near the junction between the original main block and the ell.

The house was built in 1907 to a design by Alfredo S.G. Taylor, a New York City-based architect who spent many summers in Norfolk. Taylor is credited with more than thirty commissions in Norfolk. This house exhibits a number of signature Taylor elements, including windows with small panes in both square and diamond configurations, the half-round window in the end of the gambrel gable, and the position of the entrance at the crook of the ell. The ell, although it was added in the 1920s for a subsequent owner, was also designed by Taylor.

== See also ==
- National Register of Historic Places listings in Litchfield County, Connecticut
- Ellen Battell Stoeckel
