= Moss Hill =

Historic house in Connecticut, United States

- U.S. National Register of Historic Places
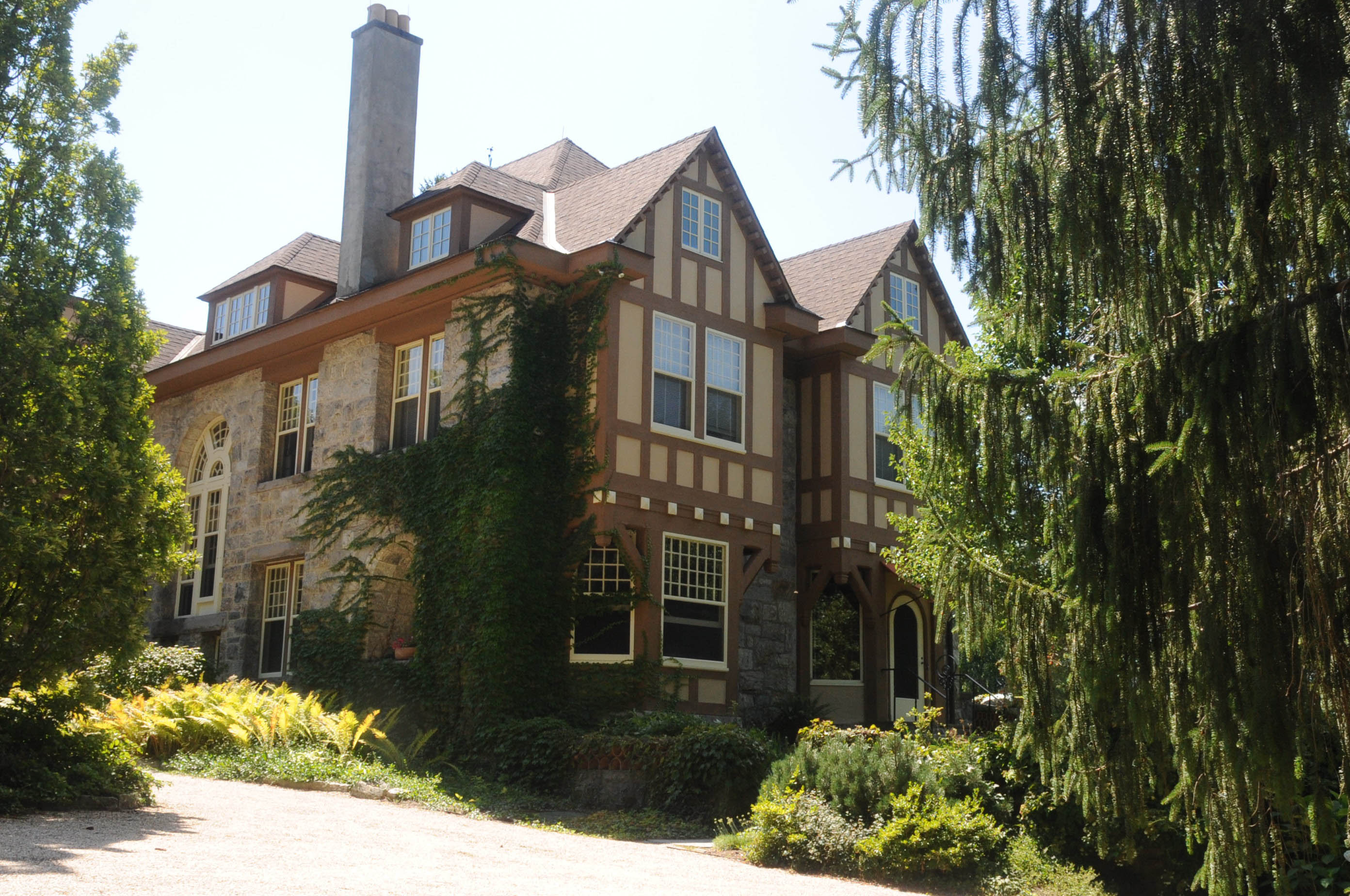

- Location within Connecticut Location within the United States
- Location: Litchfield Road., Norfolk, Connecticut
- Coordinates: 41°58′40″N 73°11′57″W
- Area: 5 acres (2.0 ha)
- Built: 1903
- Architect: Taylor, Alfredo S.G.
- MPS: Taylor, Alfredo S. G., TR
- NRHP reference No.: 82004457
- Added to NRHP: August 2, 1982

Moss Hill is a historic summer estate on Litchfield Road in Norfolk, Connecticut. Built in 1903, it is the first of more than thirty works of New York architect Alfredo S.G. Taylor in the summer resort community. It was listed on the National Register of Historic Places in 1982.

== Description and history ==
Moss Hill stands on a wooded and hilly lot on the east side of Litchfield Road, south of Norfolk village. It is a large 2 1/2-story structure, built of stone and stucco with half-timbered gables in the Tudor Revival style. Its main block is covered by a hip roof with paired gables set in the short ends. A 2 1/2-story ell extends eastward from the main block, and a gabled entry section projects slightly at the center of the western facade. The stonework is of a generally large scale, and appears to have been quarried on site. Windows are typically sash, with a large single pane in the lower sash and multiple small panes in the upper. The interior has well-preserved Beaux Arts features. Some of the upper-level windows have heavy wooden balconies outside them.

The house was built in 1903 for the mother-in-law of New York City architect Alfredo S.G. Taylor, and was the first of his more than thirty works in the community. Taylor and his wife built their own summer house here the following year, and many other commissions followed over the next twenty-plus years. This house exhibits traits that Taylor would use in a number of those works, including the rugged stone exteriors and ornate interiors.

== See also ==
- National Register of Historic Places listings in Litchfield County, Connecticut
