= Hillside (Norfolk, Connecticut) =

Historic house in Connecticut, United States

- U.S. National Register of Historic Places
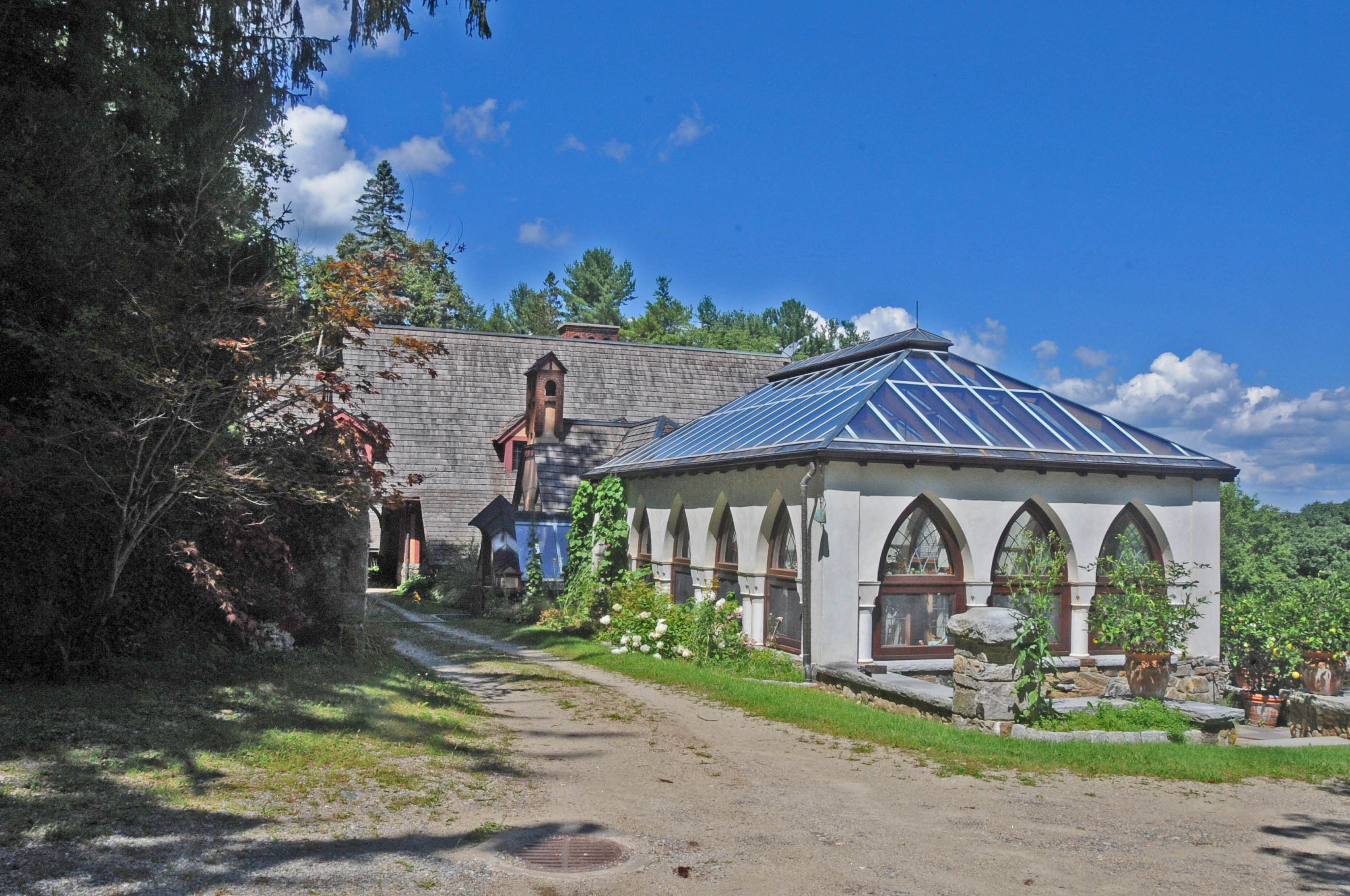

- Location within Connecticut Location within the United States
- Location: 310 Litchfield Road, Norfolk, Connecticut
- Coordinates: 41°58′33″N 73°11′46″W
- Area: 45 acres (18 ha)
- Built: 1908
- Architect: Taylor, Alfredo S.G.
- MPS: Taylor, Alfredo S. G., TR
- NRHP reference No.: 82004454
- Added to NRHP: August 2, 1982

Hillside is a historic house at 310 Litchfield Road in Norfolk, Connecticut. The house was built in 1908 for an heiress of the Remington Arms business fortune, and is one of the most spectacular designs of Alfredo S.G. Taylor, a prominent New York City architect who designed many summer properties in the community. The house was listed on the National Register of Historic Places in 1982.

== Description and history ==
Hillside is located south of the village center of Norfolk, on the east side of Litchfield Road. It is set on a lot of 45 acres (18 ha), most of which is wooded. The house occupies a ridge site with expansive views facing northwest, at the end of a winding drive at some remove from the road. It is a large Tudor Revival structure, with its basement and first floor built of fieldstone, and the upper level of half-timber and stucco. A central section is flanked by larger wing sections, each topped by a roof that has a gable section above a Craftsman-style jerkin-headed gable end. Its interior includes a large main hall with timbered ceiling 40 feet (12 m) in height, and a walkin fireplace and inglenook.

The house was built in 1908 for Helen Hartley Jenkins, who was heir to the Remington Arms fortune. It was designed by Alfredo S.G. Taylor, a New York City architect and a principal of the firm Levi and Taylor. Taylor summered in Norfolk, where he is credited with designing more than thirty buildings, many of them summer properties.

The property was renovated and added to at the turn of the twenty first by the talented artist and designer Arden Harriman Mason, using the designs of Richard Allen. Mason was the son of artists Frank Herbert Mason and Phyllis Harriman Mason and grandson of banker E. Roland Harriman.

== See also ==
- National Register of Historic Places listings in Litchfield County, Connecticut
