= Rectory and Church of the Immaculate Conception =

Historic church in Connecticut, United States

- U.S. National Register of Historic Places
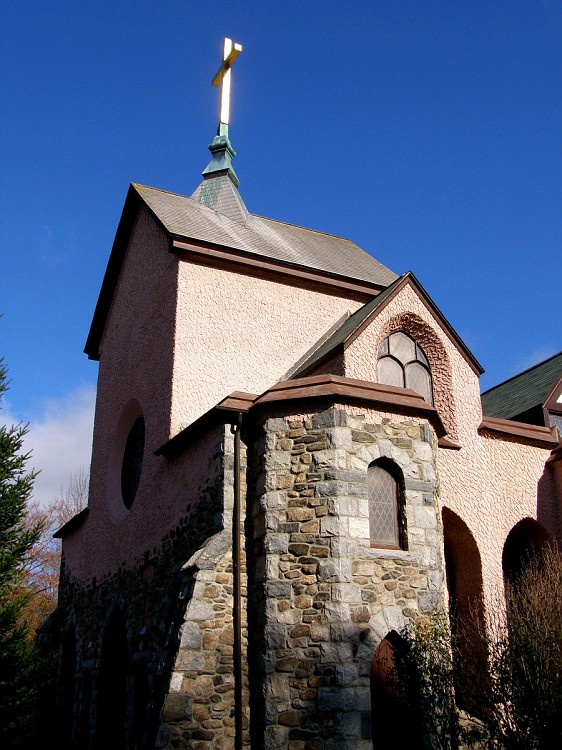

- Location within Connecticut Location within the United States
- Location: 4 North Street, Norfolk, Connecticut
- Coordinates: 41°59′40″N 73°12′7″W
- Area: 2 acres (0.81 ha)
- Built: 1924
- Architect: Taylor, Alfredo S.G.
- MPS: Taylor, Alfredo S. G., TR
- NRHP reference No.: 82004459
- Added to NRHP: August 2, 1982

The Rectory and Church of the Immaculate Conception is a historic Roman Catholic church complex at 4 North Street in Norfolk, Connecticut. The church and adjacent rectory are two 19th-century buildings that were extensively altered by architect Alfredo S. G. Taylor in 1925. The property was listed on the National Register of Historic Places in 1982 for its association with the architect. The church is part of a unified parish with St. Joseph Catholic Church in Canaan Village.

== Architecture ==
The Church of the Immaculate Conception stands on the northern edge of the village of Norfolk, on the east side of North Street (Connecticut Route 272) at its northern junction with United States Route 44. The main church building is a cruciform tall single-story building, which is basically a wood-frame structure finished in stucco and covered by a cross-gabled roof. The church was originally a somewhat typically Greek Revival mid-19th century New England country church in appearance, but is now fronted by a larger stuccoed tower with a rubblestone base that gradually transitions to stucco. The rectory stands immediately north of the church; it is a basically square two-story wood-frame structure with a hip roof, whose exterior has been finished in stucco to match the church.

The alterations of the original church building were designed by Alfredo S.G. Taylor, a New York City architect who summered in Norfolk for several decades in the early 20th century. Taylor is credited with more than 30 designs in Norfolk, including this work. It typifies Taylor's use of stone in many of his designs, with the stucco serving to give the building a somewhat Spanish Revival appearance. The design documents Taylor prepared also include drawings for an altar, one of the rare surviving examples of his interior design drawings. The altar he designed is not the one presently in use.

== See also ==
- National Register of Historic Places listings in Litchfield County, Connecticut
