= Laura M. Thurston =

American poet

- Born: Laura M. Hawley; December 20, 1812; Norfolk, Connecticut, U.S.
- Died: July 21, 1842 (aged 29); New Albany, Indiana, U.S.
- Occupations: poet; educator
- Spouse: Franklin Thurston (m. 1839)
- Writing career
- Pen name: "Viola"
- Language: English

Laura M. Thurston (née, Hawley; pen name, Viola; December 20, 1812 – July 21, 1842) was an American poet and educator. A prolific writer, most of her works were originally published in the Louisville Journal, and in William D. Gallagher's Hesperian. Among Indiana's early poets, she was a contemporary of Amanda Ruter Dufour, while among Kentucky poets, she was a friend of Amelia B. Coppuck Welby.

== Biography ==
Laura M. Hawley was born in Norfolk, Connecticut, December 20, 1812. She was the daughter of Earl P. Hawley, and Irene (Frisbie) Hawley.

Her parents being in moderate circumstances, her early advantages for education were such only as were afforded by the common district school. When she became older, however, she found means to enter John P. Brace's Hartford Female Seminary, where she continued her studies with unusual diligence and success, and secured the marked esteem of the principal and teachers.

After leaving Brace's Seminary, she was for a few years engaged as a teacher in New Milford, Connecticut, and Philadelphia, Pennsylvania, and subsequently became an assistant in Brace's Seminary. Here she remained until 1837, when, upon Brace's recommendation, she left Connecticut to take charge of the Academy at New Albany, Indiana.

In 1839, she married Franklin Thurston, a merchant of New Albany, at which time she resigned her position as school principal. She was at this time a frequent contributor to the western papers and periodicals, usually over the signature of "Viola", and soon won for herself the reputation of being one of the best women writers in the west. But in the midst of her growing fame, she died in New Albany on July 21, 1842.
