= Haystack Mountain (Connecticut) =

Mountain in Connecticut, United States

Haystack Mountain State Park
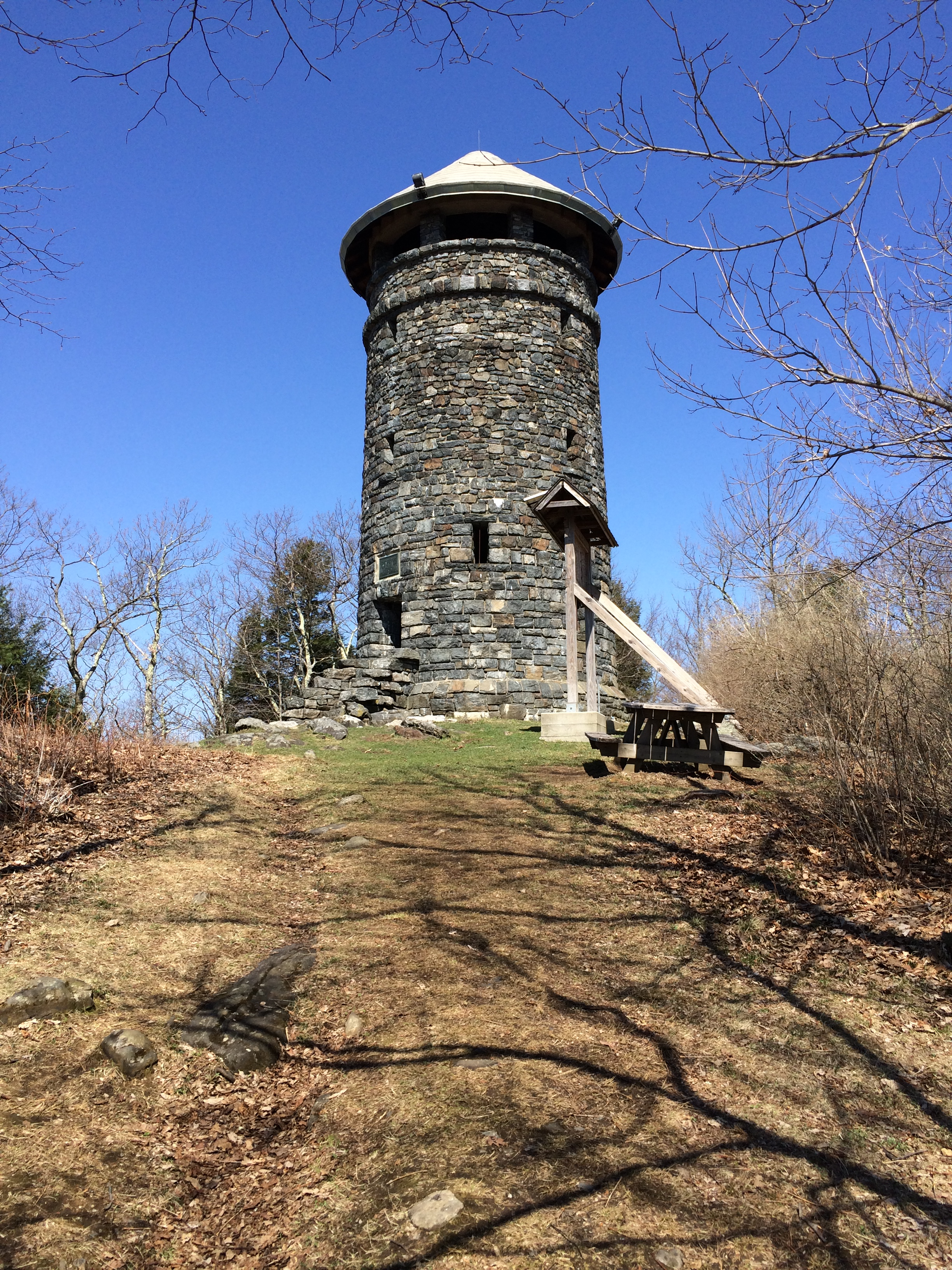
- Observation tower atop Haystack Mountain

- Location within Connecticut Location within the United States
- Location: Norfolk, Connecticut, United States
- Coordinates: 42°0′17″N 73°12′30″W
- Area: 292 acres (118 ha)
- Elevation: 1,663 ft (507 m)
- Designation: Connecticut state park
- Established: 1917
- Administrator: Connecticut Department of Energy and Environmental Protection
- Website: Haystack Mountain State Park

Haystack Mountain is a 1,680-foot-high (510 m) mountain topped with an observation tower that is the chief features of Haystack Mountain State Park, a 354-acre public recreation area in the town of Norfolk, Connecticut.

The 50-foot-tall (15 m) Haystack Mountain Tower, built in 1929 and listed on the National Register of Historic Places, sits upon it. The tower provides a view over the town of Norfolk and the neighboring town of Canaan.

Common forms of wildlife found on the mountain include raccoons, bears, deer, coyotes, opossums, bobcats, skunks and foxes. The dominant plant life include mountain laurel (the state plant), pine trees and maples.
