= Norfolk Country Club =

- Norfolk Country Club House
- U.S. National Register of Historic Places
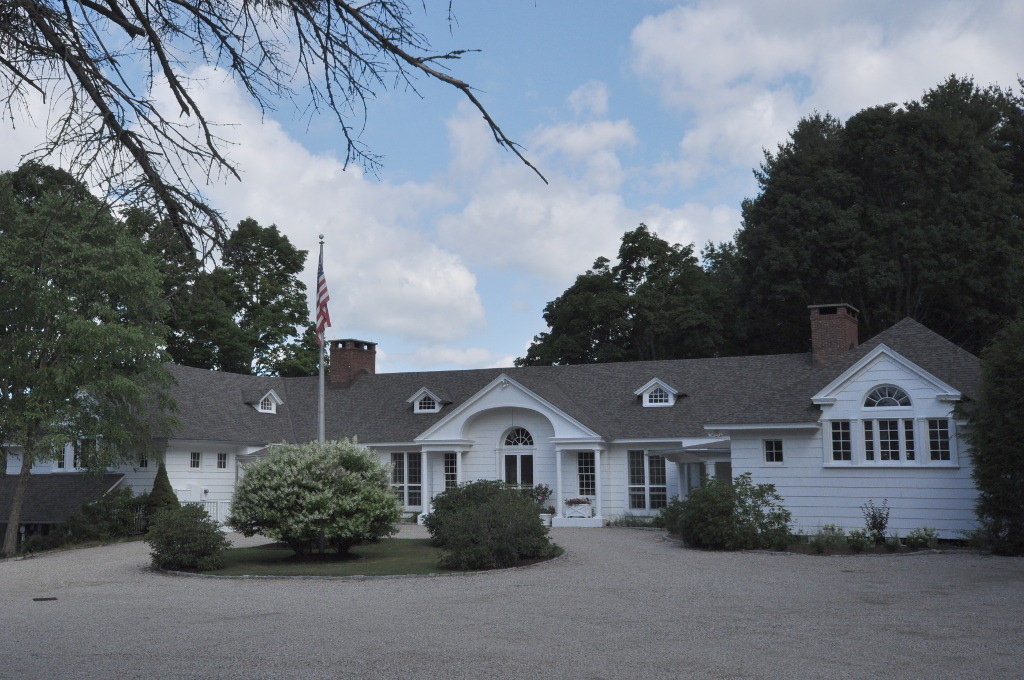

- Location within Connecticut Location within the United States
- Location: 50 Golf Drive, Norfolk, Connecticut
- Coordinates: 41°59′0″N 73°12′57″W
- Area: 1 acre (0.40 ha)
- Built: 1915
- Architect: Taylor, Alfredo S.G.
- Architectural style: Georgian Revival
- MPS: Taylor, Alfredo S. G., TR
- NRHP reference No.: 82004458
- Added to NRHP: August 2, 1982

The Norfolk Country Club is a private country club at 50 Golf Drive in Norfolk, Connecticut. Founded in the 1910s, it features a nine-hole golf course designed by A.W. Tillinghast, and a clubhouse designed by Alfredo S.G. Taylor that is listed on the National Register of Historic Places. Activities at the club include dining and social events, golf, and tennis.

== Setting ==
The Norfolk Country Club is located southwest of the village center of Norfolk, a summer resort community in the northwestern hills of Connecticut. The club is set on the west side of Golf Drive, on a roughly L-shaped parcel of 36 acres (15 ha). The clubhouse is located adjacent to Golf Drive, as are the tennis courts, with the golf course occupying most of its property. The course was designed by A.W. Tillinghast and went into service in 1928.

== Clubhouse ==
The clubhouse is a U-shaped wood frame structure with Georgian Revival design. The open mouth of the U faces south toward the main parking area, and its western facade looks over the golf course, with a band of windows providing a view. Two brick chimneys rise near the bends in the U. Small gabled dormers adorn the roof faces on the inside of the U. The main entrance is in the center of the U, sheltered by a projecting gabled portico, which is supported by round columns and has a segmented arch at its center. The ends of the U legs have gabled ends with Palladian windows. The clubhouse was built in 1915-17 to a design by Alfredo S.G. Taylor, a New York City architect who summered in Norfolk, and is credited with more than thirty commissions in the community.

== See also ==
- National Register of Historic Places listings in Litchfield County, Connecticut
