= Haystack Mountain Tower =

Park in Connecticut, United States

Haystack Mountain State Park
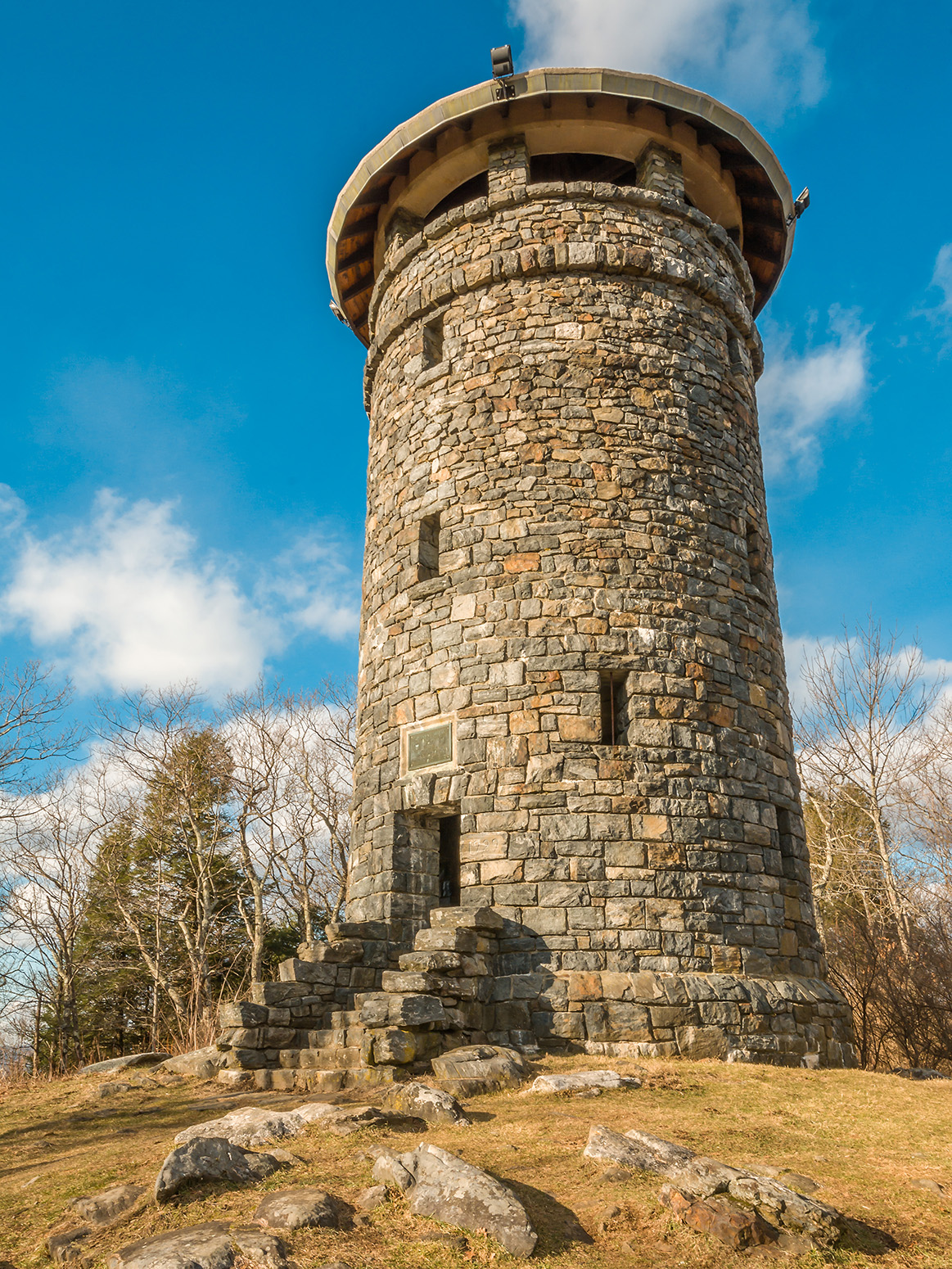

- Location within Connecticut Location within the United States
- Location: Norfolk, Connecticut, United States
- Coordinates: 42°00′16″N 73°12′29″W
- Area: 292 acres (118 ha)
- Elevation: 1,680 ft (510 m)
- Administrator: Connecticut Department of Energy and Environmental Protection
- Designation: Connecticut state park
- Website: Official website
- Haystack Mountain Tower
- U.S. National Register of Historic Places
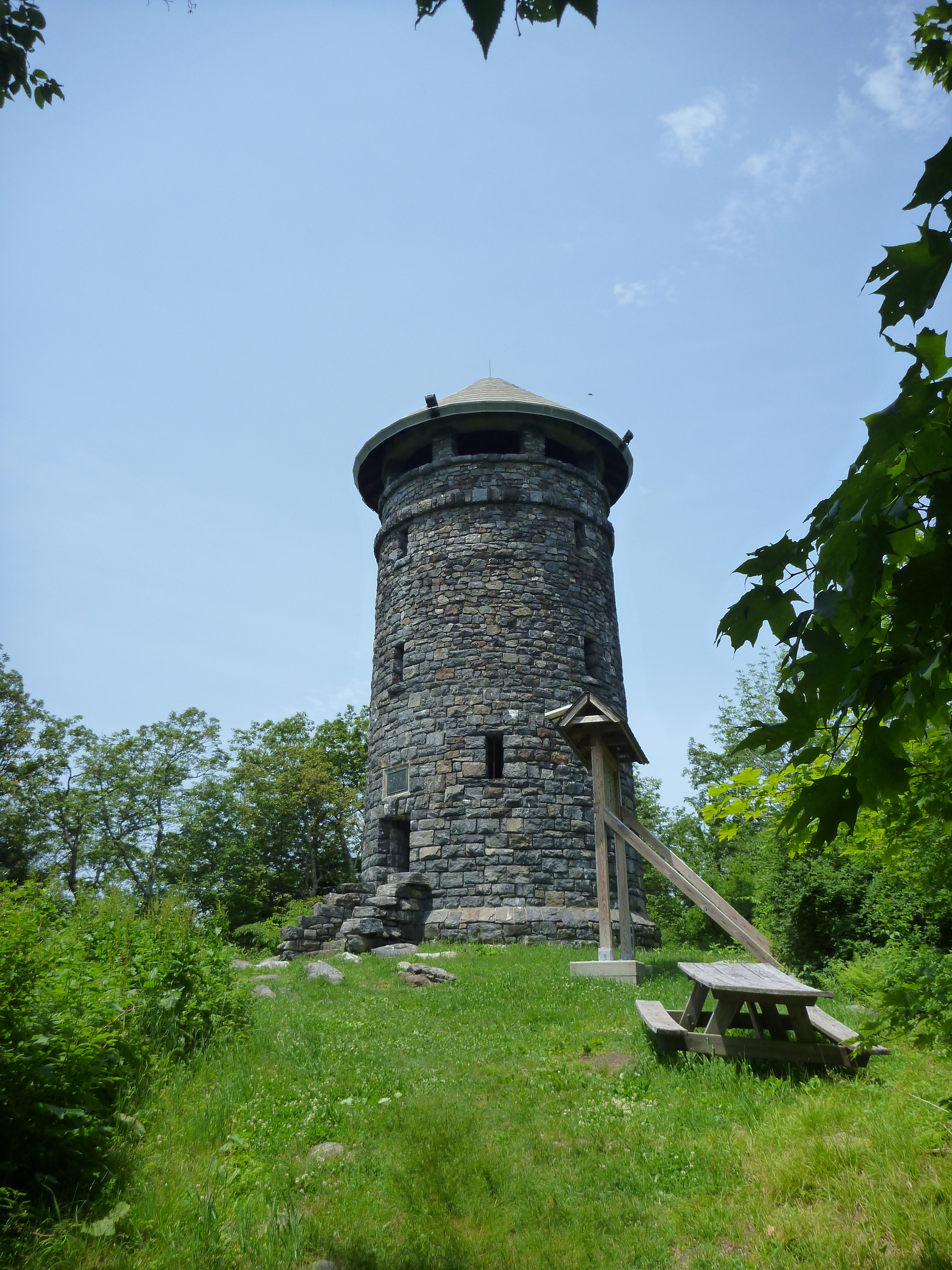
- Location: 43 North Street, Norfolk, Connecticut
- Area: 1 acre (0.40 ha)
- Built: 1929
- Architect: Rossiter & Muller
- Architectural style: Late 19th and 20th Century Revivals, Jacobean Revival
- NRHP reference No.: 93001244
- Added to NRHP: December 2, 1993

Haystack Mountain Tower is a stone observation tower at the summit of 1,680-foot (510 m) Haystack Mountain and the chief feature of Haystack Mountain State Park, a public recreation area in Norfolk, Connecticut. Built in 1929, the tower and the land on which it stands were donated by Ellen Battell Stoeckel. The tower provides views of three states and Long Island Sound. It was listed on the National Register of Historic Places in 1993.

== Description and history ==
Haystack Mountain State Park is located just north of the village center of Norfolk, with its main access road, Stoeckel Drive, beginning on Connecticut Route 272. The 1.3 mile long paved road ends in a small parking lot at the base of summit of Haystack Mountain, where the tower stands. It is 50 feet (15 m) in height and 22 feet (6.7 m) in diameter, and is built primarily of dark grey granite that was quarried at the site. The stone is randomly laid, with deeply recessed mortaring. The interior has concrete steps leading upward to two intermediate landings, with a metal stairway leading from the second landing up to a concrete observation platform, which is set under a conical roof. The elevation of the second landing is indicated on the exterior by a stone string course. The observation area has eight openings providing views in all directions. With clear weather, areas in New York, Massachusetts, and Connecticut are visible, with views as far south as Long Island Sound possible.

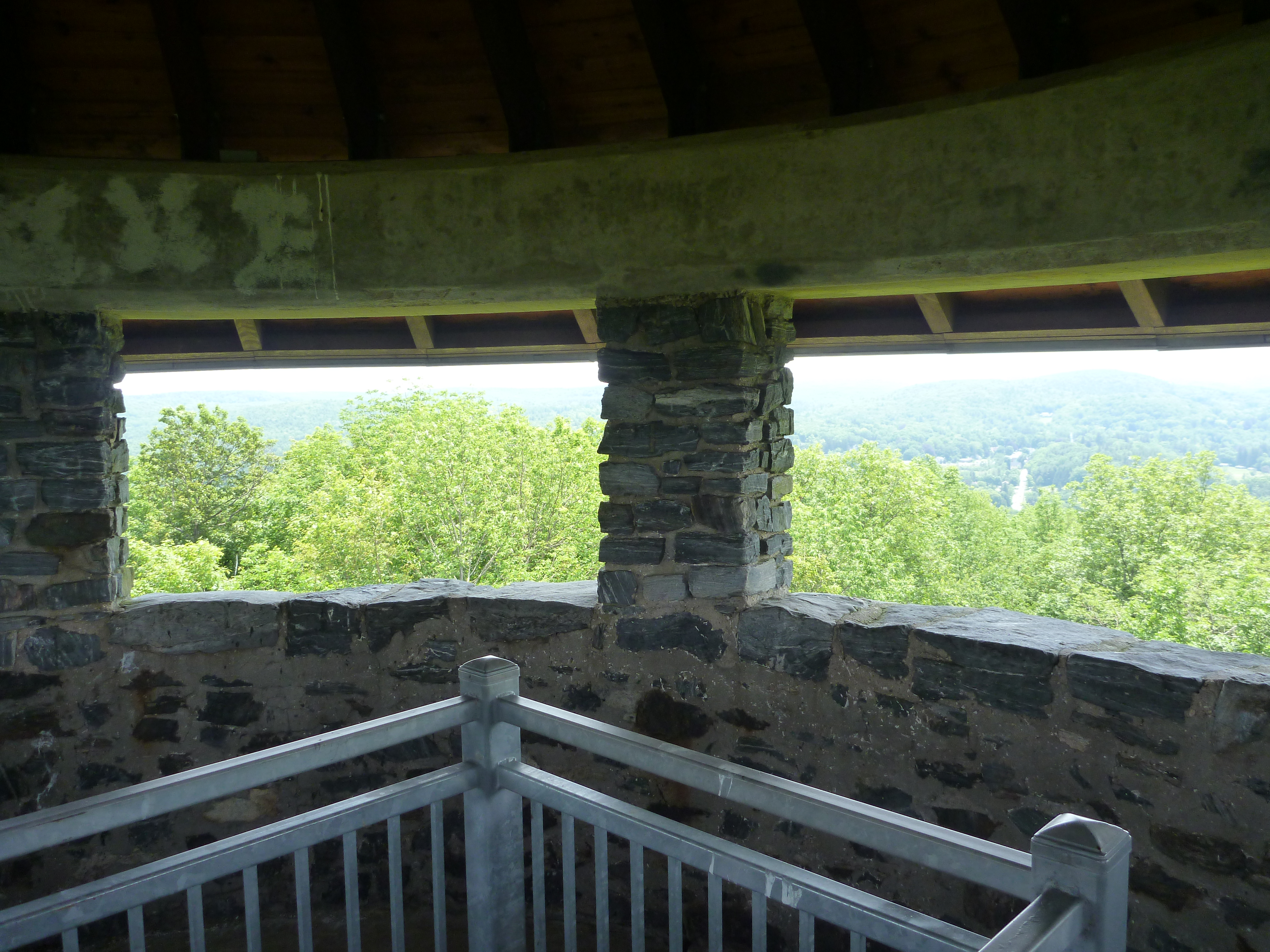
Inside the tower

The tower was designed by Ehrick K. Rossiter of Rossiter & Muller, and is a significant local example of medieval Tudor Revival architecture. It was built in 1929 and was listed on the National Register of Historic Places in 1993. It cost approximately $50,000 and was donated by Mrs. Ellen Battell Stoeckel, in memory of her husband, Carl Stoeckel. Mrs. Stoeckel's donation also included the initial tracts of land that make up the state park.

== Activities and amenities ==
The state park offers opportunities for hiking, picnicking, and cross-country skiing.

== See also ==
- National Register of Historic Places listings in Litchfield County, Connecticut
