= Low House (Norfolk, Connecticut) =

Historic house in Connecticut, United States

- U.S. National Register of Historic Places
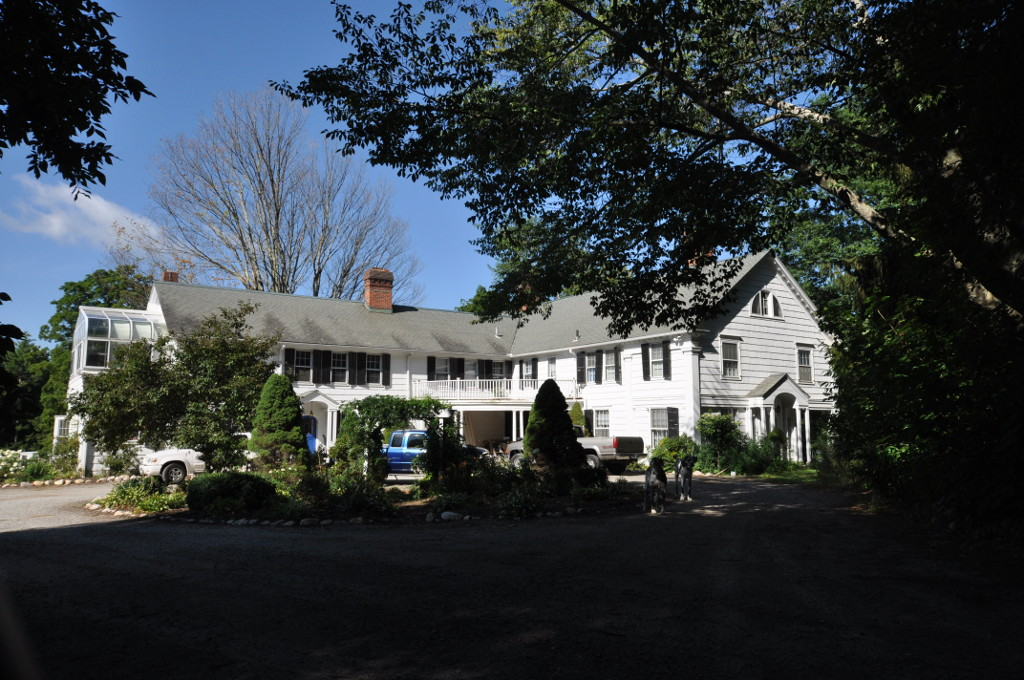

- Location within Connecticut Location within the United States
- Location: Laurel Way Extension, Norfolk, Connecticut
- Coordinates: 41°59′6″N 73°11′8″W
- Area: 22 acres (8.9 ha)
- Built: 1920
- Architect: Taylor & Levi
- Architectural style: Colonial Revival, Georgian Revival
- MPS: Taylor, Alfredo S. G., TR
- NRHP reference No.: 84001067
- Added to NRHP: February 17, 1984

The Low House is a historic house on Laurel Way Extension in Norfolk, Connecticut. Built in 1920, it is a local example of Georgian Revival architecture, designed by the New York architect Alfredo S.G. Taylor. It was listed on the National Register of Historic Places in 1984, for its association with the architect.

== Description and history ==
The Low House stands in a small residential area east of Norfolk's village center, down a private lane extending south from Laurel Way Extension. It consists of two rectangular 2 1/2-story wood-frame structures in the Georgian style, joined at right angles at one corner. Each section is covered by a gabled roof and is finished in wooden shingles. The facades are adorned with pilasters at regular intervals, and there are modillion blocks in the eaves. A single-story porch in the shape of a circle segment is located at the crook of the L, supported by paired round columns. Another open porch extends behind the western section.

The house was built in 1920 for the Low family, who were friends with the Nobles who lived next door. It was designed by Alfredo S.G. Taylor, a New York City architect and a principal of the firm Levi and Taylor. Taylor summered in Norfolk, where he is credited with designing more than thirty buildings, many of them summer properties. Taylor was known to the Nobles, and designed their house as well. Both houses are finely detailed examples of Taylor's application of the Georgian Revival to modern housing demands.

== See also ==
- National Register of Historic Places listings in Litchfield County, Connecticut
