= Rockwell House (Norfolk, Connecticut) =

Historic house in Connecticut, United States

- U.S. National Register of Historic Places
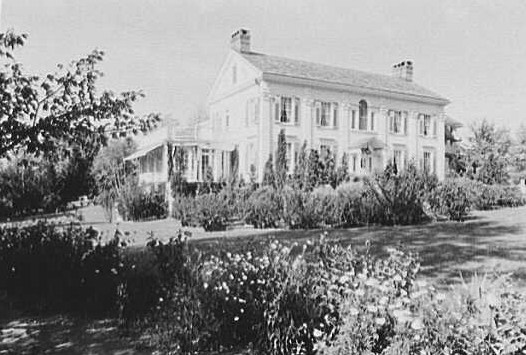
- Rockwell House in 1930

- Location within Connecticut Location within the United States
- Location: Laurel Way, Norfolk, Connecticut
- Coordinates: 41°59′36″N 73°11′33″W
- Area: 5 acres (2.0 ha)
- Built: 1928
- Architect: Taylor, Alfredo S.G.
- Architectural style: Adamesque
- MPS: Taylor, Alfredo S. G., TR
- NRHP reference No.: 82004460
- Added to NRHP: August 2, 1982

The Frederick W. Rockwell House is a historic house on the West Side of Laurel Way in Norfolk, Connecticut. Built in 1927 to a design by Alfredo S.G. Taylor, it is a finely detailed example of Adamesque Federal Revival architecture. The house was listed on the National Register of Historic Places in 1982 for its association with the architect.

== Description and history ==
The Rockwell House stands in a residential area northeast of Norfolk's central village, on the southwest side of Laurel Way just east of its junction with Maple Avenue. Its main block is a 2 1/2-story wood-frame structure, oriented facing south, five bays wide, with a slate roof. The main facade's bays are separated by two-story pilasters, which are also found at the corners. A full entablature extends above the pilasters just below the roof line. The main entrance is centered, with a Palladian window above. Its features are in a strongly Adamesque variant of the Federal Revival. It includes a number of Taylor quirks, including a dumbwaiter for hauling firewood. A gambrel-roofed servant wing extends north from the main block.

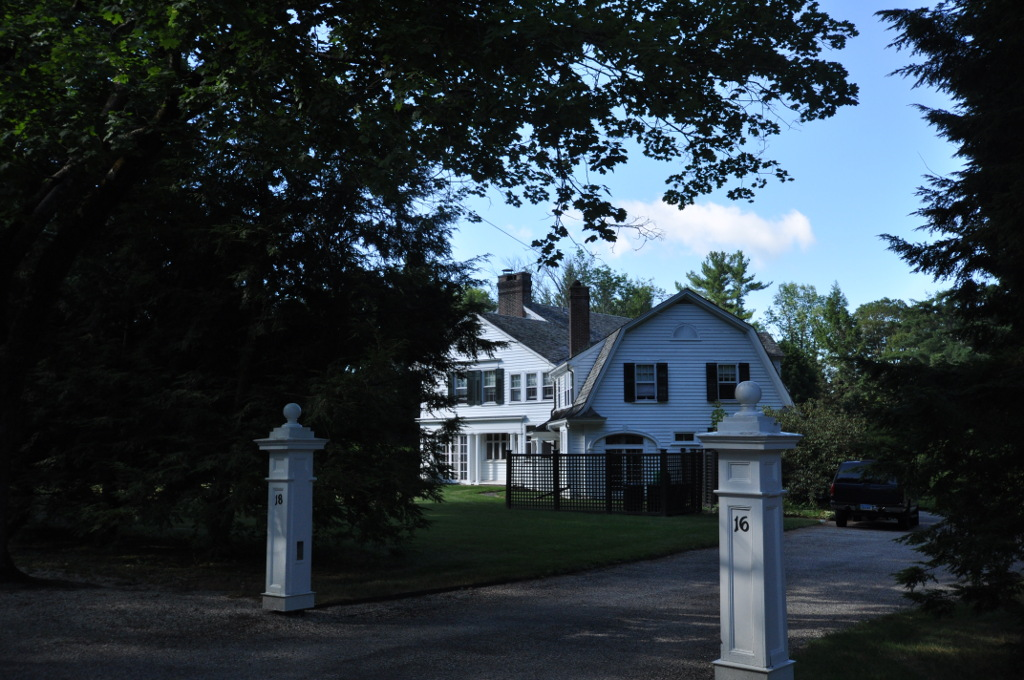
The house in 2016

The house was designed by architect Alfredo S.G. Taylor, a New York City architect who spent many summers in Norfolk. This house is one of more than 30 buildings commissioned from Taylor in the town. It is one of the most academically correct of his Norfolk designs, although it exhibits a number of characteristic flourishes, including the use of elliptical arches.

== See also ==
- National Register of Historic Places listings in Litchfield County, Connecticut
