= Blackberry River Inn =

Historic house in Connecticut, United States

- Moseley House-Farm
- U.S. National Register of Historic Places
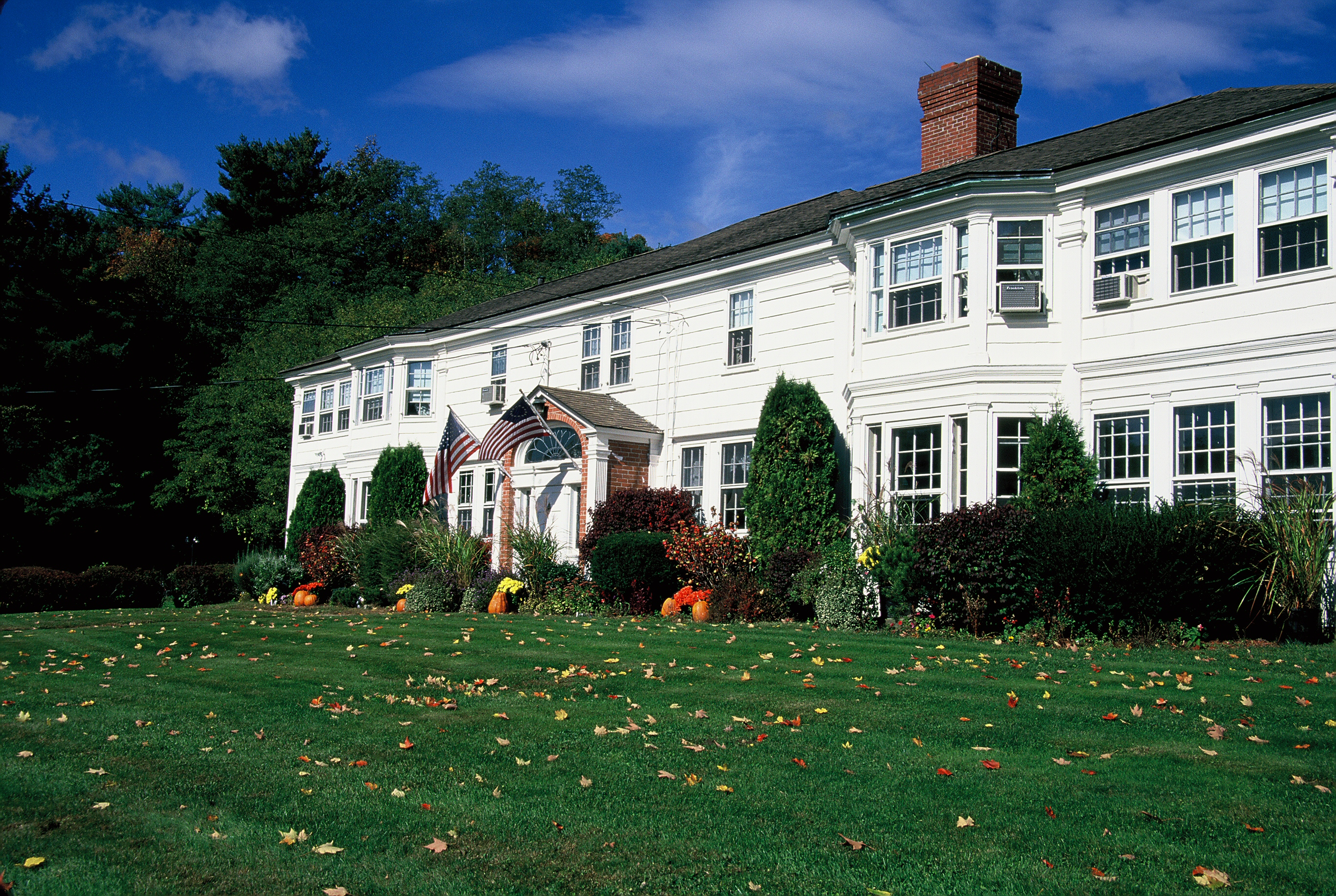
- Front facade

- Location within Connecticut Location within the United States
- Location: 538 Greenwoods Road, Norfolk and North Canaan, Connecticut
- Coordinates: 42°0′23″N 73°14′29″W
- Area: 9 acres (3.6 ha)
- Built: 1763
- Architect: Taylor & Levi
- Architectural style: Colonial Revival, Georgian Revival architecture
- MPS: Taylor, Alfredo S. G., TR
- NRHP reference No.: 84001077
- Added to NRHP: February 17, 1984

The Blackberry River Inn (historically known as the Moseley House-Farm) is a colonial mansion at 538 Greenwoods Road West (United States Route 44) in Norfolk, Connecticut. Constructed in 1763, the mansion was listed on the National Register of Historic Places under its historic name in 1984.

== History ==
The first parts of what is known as Blackberry River Inn today were erected in 1763. It was extensively renovated in the 1920s according to designs of architect Alfredo S.G. Taylor, an architect from New York City who summered in Norfolk. Taylor designed a large number of works in Norfolk, and the alterations to this house were among the more ambitious of his renovation projects, leaving little indication of the original appearance. Distinctive in this example are his use of semi-elliptical arches, and the absence of a Palladian window, a feature he commonly included in renovations.

Seth H. Moseley (born October 16, 1881, in New Haven) who also owned the Collingwood Hotel in New York, NY (known as Hotel Metro today and located at 43-49 West 35th Street) was the owner of the property until his death on Dec 7, 1938. Up until 1939, the property was used as a farm and known as Blackberry River Farm. After the death of Mr. Moseley, Dorothea and James Schwarzhaupt bought the property and transformed it into an inn.

== After 1970 ==
On July 19, 1971 the owners Dorothea and James Schwarzhaupt sold the inn to a local corporation which modernized the property and among other changes added the swimming pool.

It was listed on the National Register of Historic Places in 1984. The listed property included 9 acres (3.6 ha) in Norfolk and 1 acre (0.40 ha) in North Canaan. The current owners acquired the property on June 21, 1993. Today Blackberry River Inn is operated as a bed and breakfast.

== See also ==
- National Register of Historic Places listings in Litchfield County, Connecticut
