= World War I Memorial (Norfolk, Connecticut) =

- U.S. National Register of Historic Places
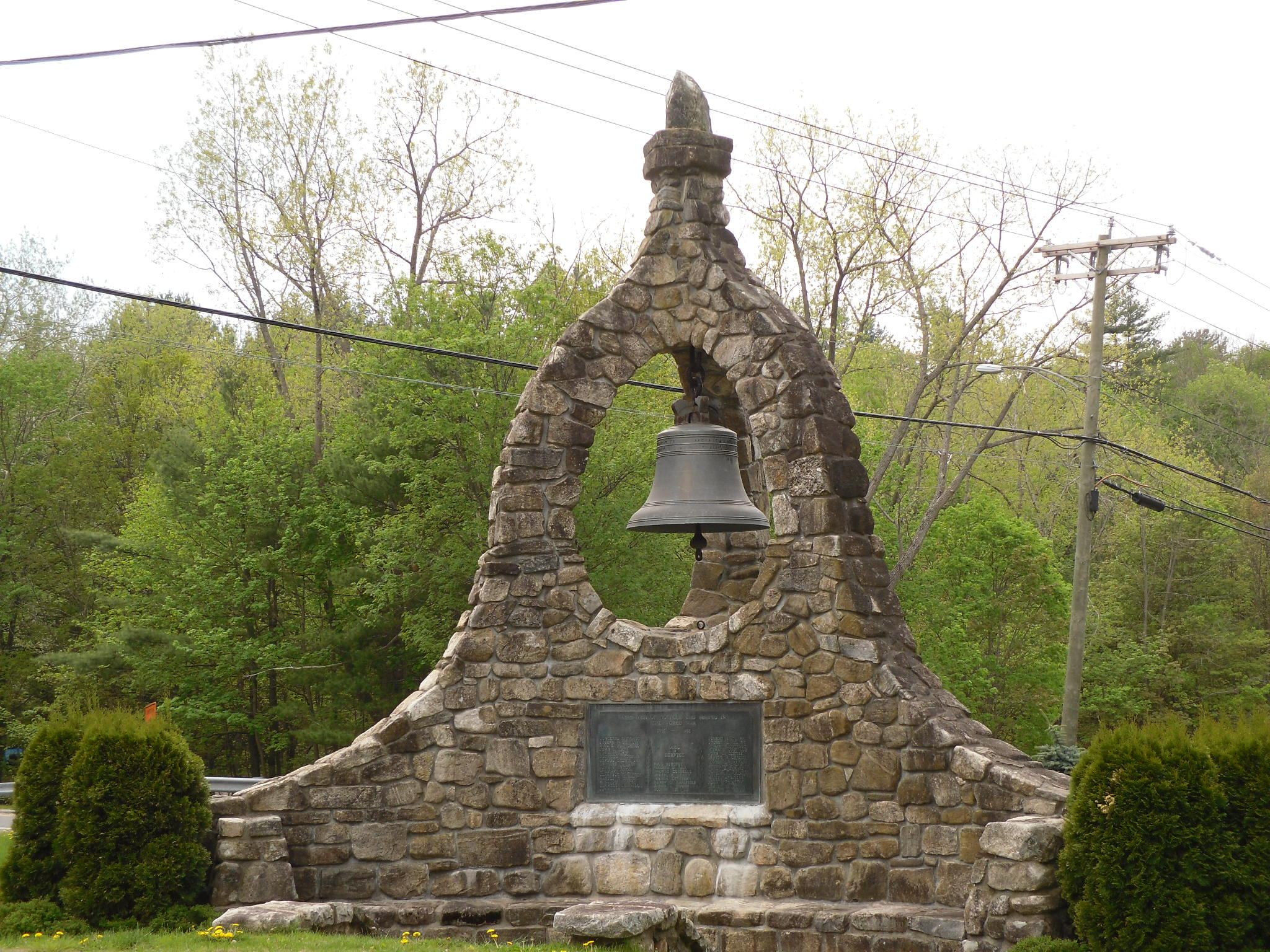

- Location within Connecticut Location within the United States
- Location: Greenwoods Road West and North Streets, Norfolk, Connecticut
- Coordinates: 41°59′40″N 73°12′10″W
- Area: 0.1 acres (0.040 ha)
- Built: 1921
- Architect: Taylor, Alfredo, S. G.
- Architectural style: Rustic
- MPS: Taylor, Alfredo S. G., TR
- NRHP reference No.: 84001106
- Added to NRHP: February 17, 1984

The World War I Memorial of Norfolk, Connecticut stands at the corner of Greenwoods Road West and North Street in the town's village center. The Rustic style memorial was built in 1921 to a design by New York City architect Alfredo S.G. Taylor. It was added to the National Register of Historic Places in 1984 for its association with the architect.

== Description and history ==
Norfolk's World War I Memorial stands in a triangular grassy area at the junction of Greenwoods Road West and North Street, near the northern end of the village center. The monument itself is a triangular structure built out of ashlar granite, standing about 15 feet (4.6 m) high. Each of its three legs rises in a bellcast shape to a common peak, beneath which hangs a replica of the Liberty Bell. Bronze tablets commemorating the town's World War I soldiers are placed on each of the monument's curved triangular faces, just above stone bench projections.

The memorial was designed by Alfredo S.G. Taylor, an architect based in New York City who spent many summers in Norfolk. He is credited with more than thirty commissions in the community, including public and commercial buildings as well as many private residences. The memorial was dedicated in 1921. It is stylistically in keeping with Taylor's previous uses of stone and rustic styling. In giving him the commission, the town laid down four requirements:

1. It should be large enough to express the forces of war
2. It should avoid the need for a sculpture
3. It should be made of local materials
4. It should be simple enough to be constructed by the relatives of the war dead

== See also ==
- National Register of Historic Places listings in Litchfield County, Connecticut
