= Gould House (Norfolk, Connecticut) =

Historic house in Connecticut, United States

- U.S. National Register of Historic Places
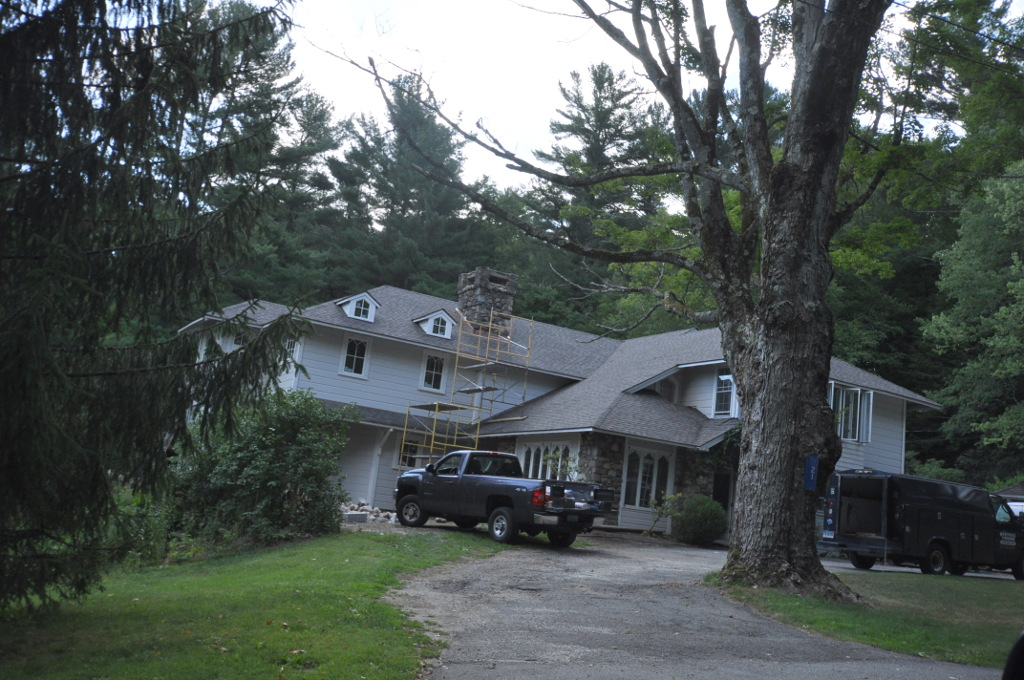

- Location within Connecticut Location within the United States
- Location: Golf Drive, Norfolk, Connecticut
- Coordinates: 41°59′8″N 73°12′57″W
- Area: 1 acre (0.40 ha)
- Built: 1915
- Architect: Taylor, Alfredo S.G.
- MPS: Taylor, Alfredo S. G., TR
- NRHP reference No.: 82004452
- Added to NRHP: August 2, 1982

The Gould House is a historic house on Golf Drive in Norfolk, Connecticut. It was built in 1915 to a design by Alfredo S.G. Taylor, a prominent New York City architect who summered in Norfolk. The house was listed on the National Register of Historic Places in 1982 for its association with the architect.

== Description and history ==
The Gould House stands in a rural residential area southwest of Norfolk's village center, on the east side of Golf Drive just north of the Norfolk Country Club. It is a two-story wood-frame structure, set on a sloping lot. The house's most distinguishing feature is its unusual roof configuration. It is basically a broad gabled roof, which extends down to the first floor on the left side, and then wraps across the front between the first and second levels. Above this is a hip-roofed projection, giving that portion the appearance of a gable-on-hip configuration. A projecting hip-roofed section projects to the left further back, giving the overall house massing an L shape. The ground floor is finished in broad clapboards, while the upper levels are shingled. Fieldstone posts provide some visual differentiation on the first floor.

The house was built in 1915 to a design by Alfredo S.G. Taylor, a prominent New York architect in the firm of Taylor and Levi. Taylor spent his summers in Norfolk, and designed more than thirty buildings and structures in and around the community, some for quite high-profile client.

== See also ==
- National Register of Historic Places listings in Litchfield County, Connecticut
