= Campbell Falls State Park Reserve =

State park in Connecticut, United States

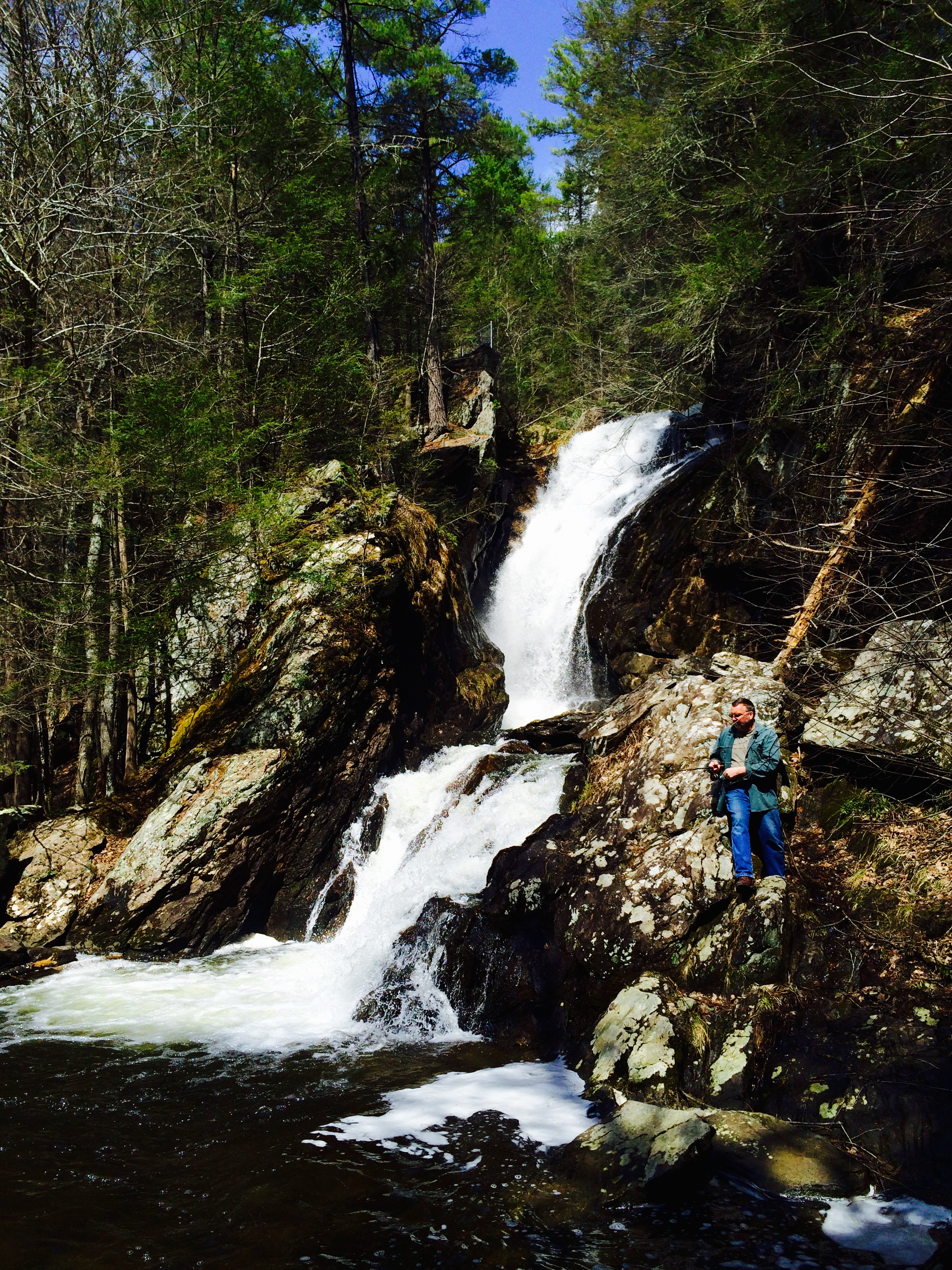
- Campbell Falls

- Location within Connecticut Location within the United States
- Interactive map of Campbell Falls State Park Reserve
- Location: Norfolk, Connecticut, United States
- Coordinates: 42°02′45″N 73°13′58″W
- Area: 102 acres (41 ha)
- Elevation: 1,024 ft (312 m)
- Established: 1923
- Administrator: Connecticut Department of Energy and Environmental Protection
- Designation: Connecticut state park
- Website: Official website

Campbell Falls State Park Reserve is an undeveloped, public recreation area and nature preserve located in the town of Norfolk, Connecticut. The 102-acre (41 ha) state park offers hiking, stream fishing, and views of the park's namesake waterfall which cascades nearly 100 feet (30 m) on the Whiting River just north of the Connecticut/Massachusetts state line. Legislation passed in 1923 and 1924 provided for the joint management of the park after the land was donated to the two states by the White Memorial Foundation. A stone monument within the park marks the border between the states.
