= Dennis Hill State Park =

State park in Litchfield County, Connecticut

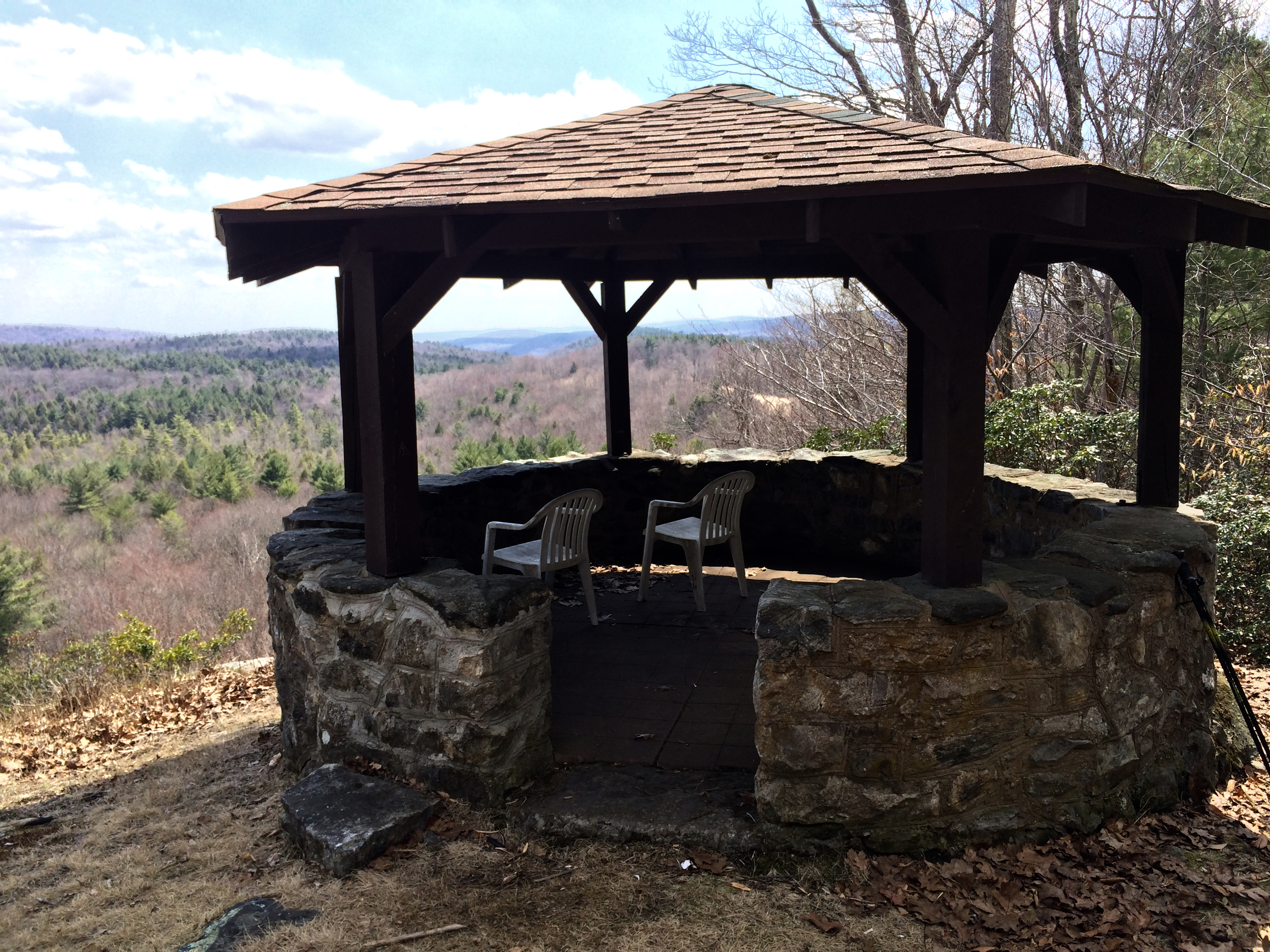
- Picnic pavilion overlooking the park's southeast perimeter

- Location within Connecticut Location within the United States
- Location: Norfolk, Connecticut, United States
- Coordinates: 41°56′55″N 73°11′56″W
- Area: 240 acres (97 ha)
- Elevation: 1,631 ft (497 m)
- Established: 1935
- Administrator: Connecticut Department of Energy and Environmental Protection
- Designation: Connecticut state park
- Website: Official website
- Tamarack Lodge Bungalow
- U.S. National Register of Historic Places
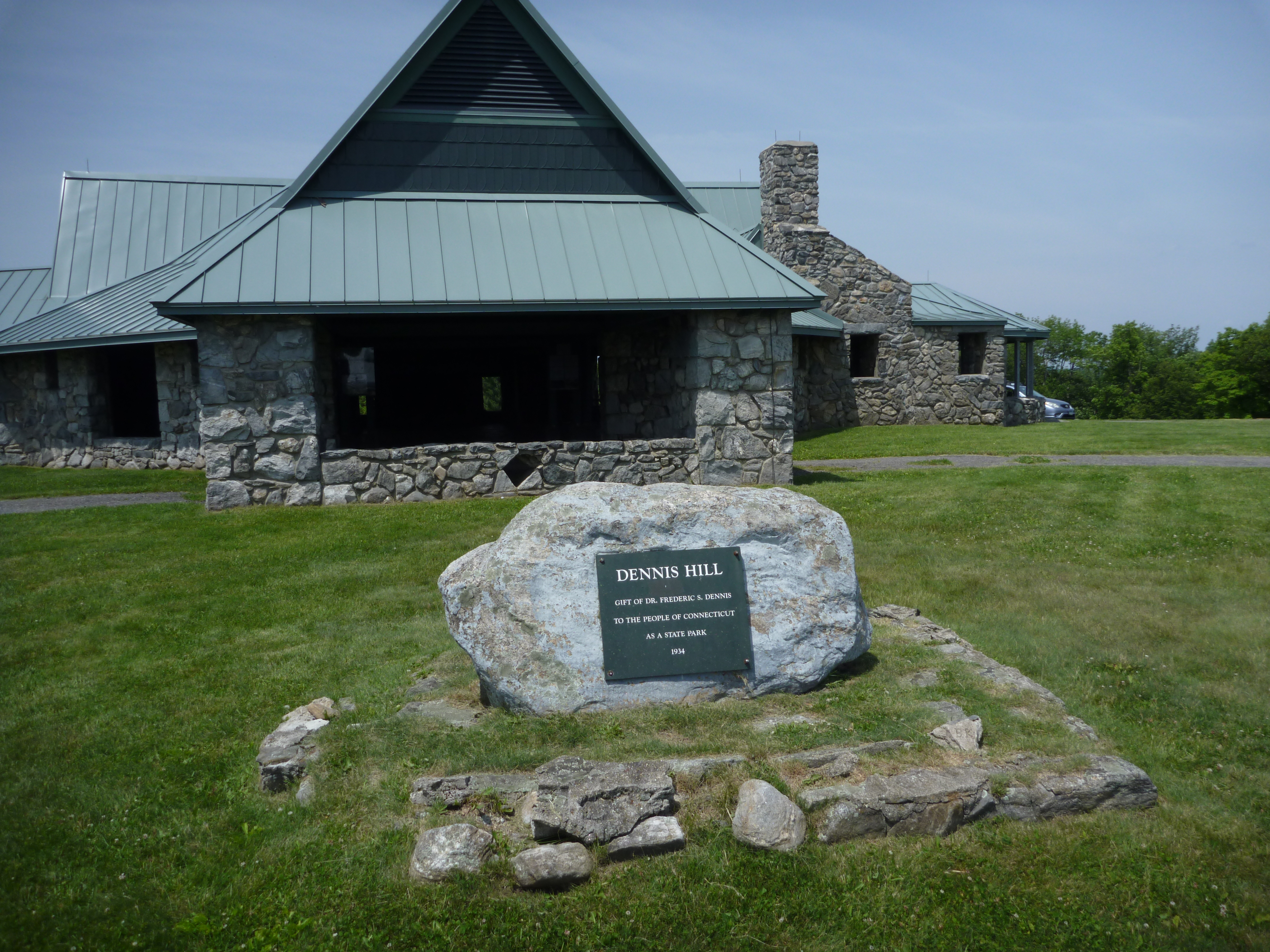
- Tamarack Bungalow on Dennis Hill
- Location: Dennis Hill State Park, Norfolk, Connecticut
- Area: 5 acres (2.0 ha)
- Built: 1909
- Architect: Alfredo S.G. Taylor
- NRHP reference No.: 77001499
- Added to NRHP: September 16, 1977

Dennis Hill State Park is a public recreation area located in the town of Norfolk, Connecticut, that was once the estate of Dr. Frederick Shepard Dennis. The state park offers hiking, picnicking, and scenic views. It is administered by the Connecticut Department of Energy and Environmental Protection.

== Features ==
The park is located in southern Norfolk, with its main access road off Connecticut Route 272. The road provides access to a picnic area, and a parking area further up the hill, from which there is access to hiking trails and the summit road. Dennis Hill stands at an elevation of 1,627 feet (496 m). The cleared summit area provides expansive views of the surrounding hills, and includes small pavilions and a large bungalow-style structure.

The bungalow, originally called the Tamarack Lodge Bungalow, is a stone building with a standing seam metal roof. Originally built as a summer lodge providing residential space, its interior has largely been stripped of original features and its windows have been removed. The loft areas on the upper level surrounding the main room were probably intended as sleeping space. The building, a significant example of local summer estate architecture, is listed on the National Register of Historic Places.

== History ==
The 240 acres (97 ha) that make up Dennis Hill State Park were once the estate of Frederic S. Dennis (1850-1934). Dennis was a successful New York City doctor who summered in Norfolk for many years. He called his estate "Tamarac," and in 1908 retained architect Alfredo S.G. Taylor to design the bungalow at the summit of Dennis Hill. Here he hosted numerous luminaries of the day, including steel magnate Andrew Carnegie, President William Howard Taft, and conductor Walter Damrosch. Dennis gifted his estate to the state in 1935.

== See also ==
- National Register of Historic Places listings in Litchfield County, Connecticut
