= Alfredo S. G. Taylor =

American architect

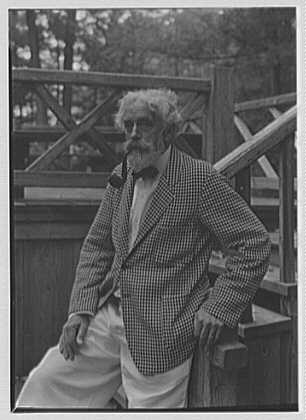
- Alfredo S. G. Taylor at Holbrook Camp II, 1936
- Born: 1872
- Died: 1947 (aged 74–75)
- Education: Harvard College (BA); Columbia University (BS)
- Occupation: Architect
- Practice: Taylor & Levi

Alfredo S. G. Taylor (1872–1947) was an architect, of the New York firm Taylor & Levi, which he co-founded with Julian Clarence Levi.

He was educated at Harvard College, class of 1894, and received his B.S. from Columbia Graduate School of Architecture, Planning and Preservation in 1897.

Many of his works are listed on the U.S. National Register of Historic Places. At least two, the Starling W. Childs House and the Frederick W. Rockwell House, both in Norfolk, Connecticut, were documented in the U.S. Historic American Buildings Survey.

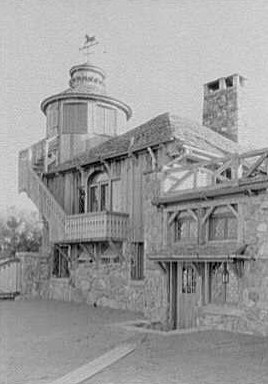
"Sport house" of Starling Childs, Norfolk, Connecticut, in 1930

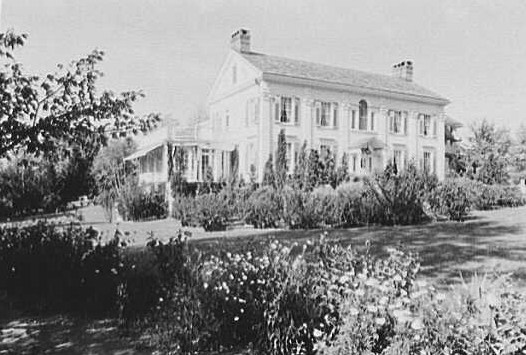
Frederick W. Rockwell House

Hillside (Norfolk, Connecticut), was designed by Taylor for an heiress of the Remington Arms business fortune, and was built in 1908. It is one of his more "spectacular" houses.

Taylor was the designer of over thirty buildings in Norfolk, Connecticut, in a wide variety of styles, in the four decades before the Second World War. He designed a lavish summer pavilion in Norfolk's Dennis Hill State Park, of which only remnants survive.

== Work ==
- Starling Childs Camp, Doolittle Lake, Norfolk, CT (Taylor, Alfredo S. G.), NRHP-listed
- Gould House, Golf Dr., Norfolk, CT (Taylor, Alfredo S. G.), NRHP-listed
- Hillside, Litchfield Rd., Norfolk, CT (Taylor, Alfredo S. G.), NRHP-listed
- Mead Camp, Doolittle Lake, Norfolk, CT (Taylor, Alfredo S. G.), NRHP-listed
- Moss Hill, Litchfield Rd., Norfolk, CT (Taylor, Alfredo S. G.), NRHP-listed
- Norfolk Country Club House, Golf Dr., Norfolk, CT (Taylor, Alfredo S. G.), NRHP-listed
- Rectory and Church of the Immaculate Conception, North St., Norfolk, CT (Taylor, Alfredo S. G.), NRHP-listed
- Rockwell House, Laurel Way, W., Norfolk, CT (Taylor, Alfredo S. G.), NRHP-listed
- John Shepard House, Shepard Park Rd., Norfolk, CT (Taylor, Alfredo S. G.), NRHP-listed
- Robbins Stoeckel House, Litchfield Rd., Norfolk, CT (Taylor, Alfredo S. G.), NRHP-listed
- World War I Memorial, Greenwoods Rd. West and North Sts., Norfolk, CT (Taylor, Alfredo, S. G.), NRHP-listed
- Low House (Norfolk, Connecticut), Highfield Rd., Norfolk, CT (Taylor & Levi), NRHP-listed
- Moseley House-Farm, Greenwoods Rd., Norfolk, CT (Taylor & Levi), NRHP-listed
- Mulville House, Mountain Rd., Norfolk, CT (Taylor & Levi), NRHP-listed
- Noble House (Norfolk, Connecticut), Highfield Rd., Norfolk, CT (Taylor & Levi), NRHP-listed
- Norfolk Downs Shelter, Gold Rd., Norfolk, CT (Taylor & Levi), NRHP-listed
- Sports Building, Windrow Rd., Norfolk, CT (Taylor & Levi), NRHP-listed
- Tom Thumb House, Windrow Rd., Norfolk, CT (Taylor & Levi), NRHP-listed
