= Norfolk, Connecticut =

- Town
- Town of Norfolk
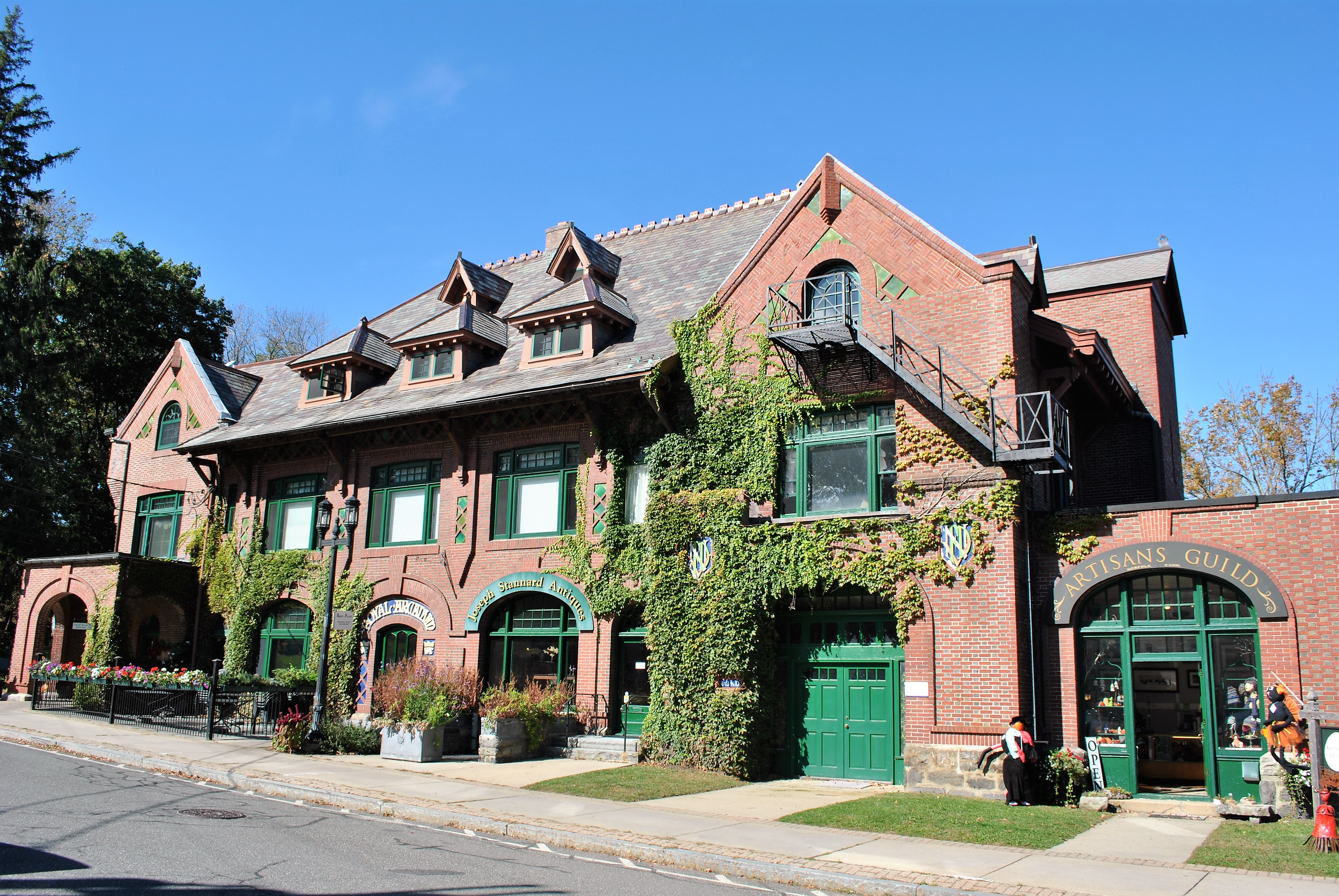
- Shops in Downtown Norfolk

- Seal

- Coordinates: 41°59′01″N 73°11′47″W
- Country: United States
- U.S. state: Connecticut
- County: Litchfield
- Region: Northwest Hills
- Incorporated: 1758

Government
  - Type: Selectman-town meeting
  - First selectman: Matthew T. Riiska (D)
  - Selectman: Susan M. Dyer (D)
  - Selectman: Alexandra (Sandy) Evans (R)

Area
  - Total: 46.4 sq mi (120.2 km^{2})
  - Land: 45.3 sq mi (117.4 km^{2})
  - Water: 1.1 sq mi (2.9 km^{2})
- Elevation: 1,230 ft (375 m)

Population (2020)
  - Total: 1,588
  - Density: 35/sq mi (13.5/km^{2})
- Time zone: UTC-5 (Eastern)
  - Summer (DST): UTC-4 (Eastern)
- ZIP code: 06058
- Area codes: 860/959
- FIPS code: 09-53470
- GNIS feature ID: 0213476
- Website: www.norfolkct.org

Norfolk is a town in Litchfield County, Connecticut, United States. The population was 1,588 at the 2020 census. The town is part of the Northwest Hills Planning Region. The urban center of the town is the Norfolk census-designated place, with a population of 553 at the 2010 census.

Norfolk is the home of the Norfolk Chamber Music Festival, an annual chamber music concert series hosted by the Yale School of Music. The festival takes place in the Music Shed, a performance hall located on the Ellen Battell Stoeckel estate to the west of the village green.

Norfolk has important examples of regional architecture, including the Village Hall (now Infinity Hall, a shingled 1880s Arts-and-Crafts confection, with an opera house upstairs and storefronts at street level); the Norfolk Library (a shingle-style structure, designed by George Keller, c. 1888/1889); and over thirty buildings, in a wide variety of styles, designed by Alfredo S. G. Taylor (of the New York firm Taylor & Levi) in the four decades before the Second World War.

== History ==
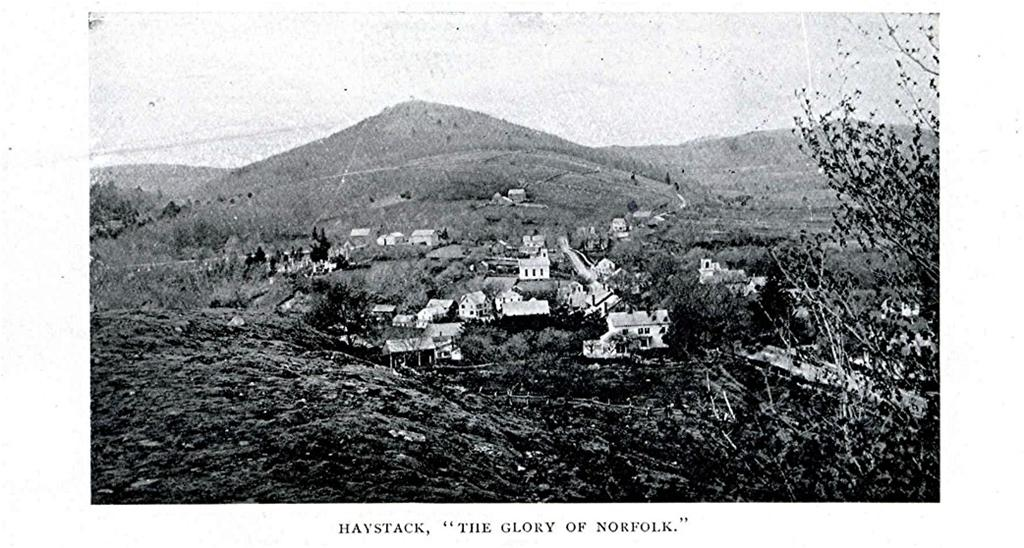
Norfolk in 1897

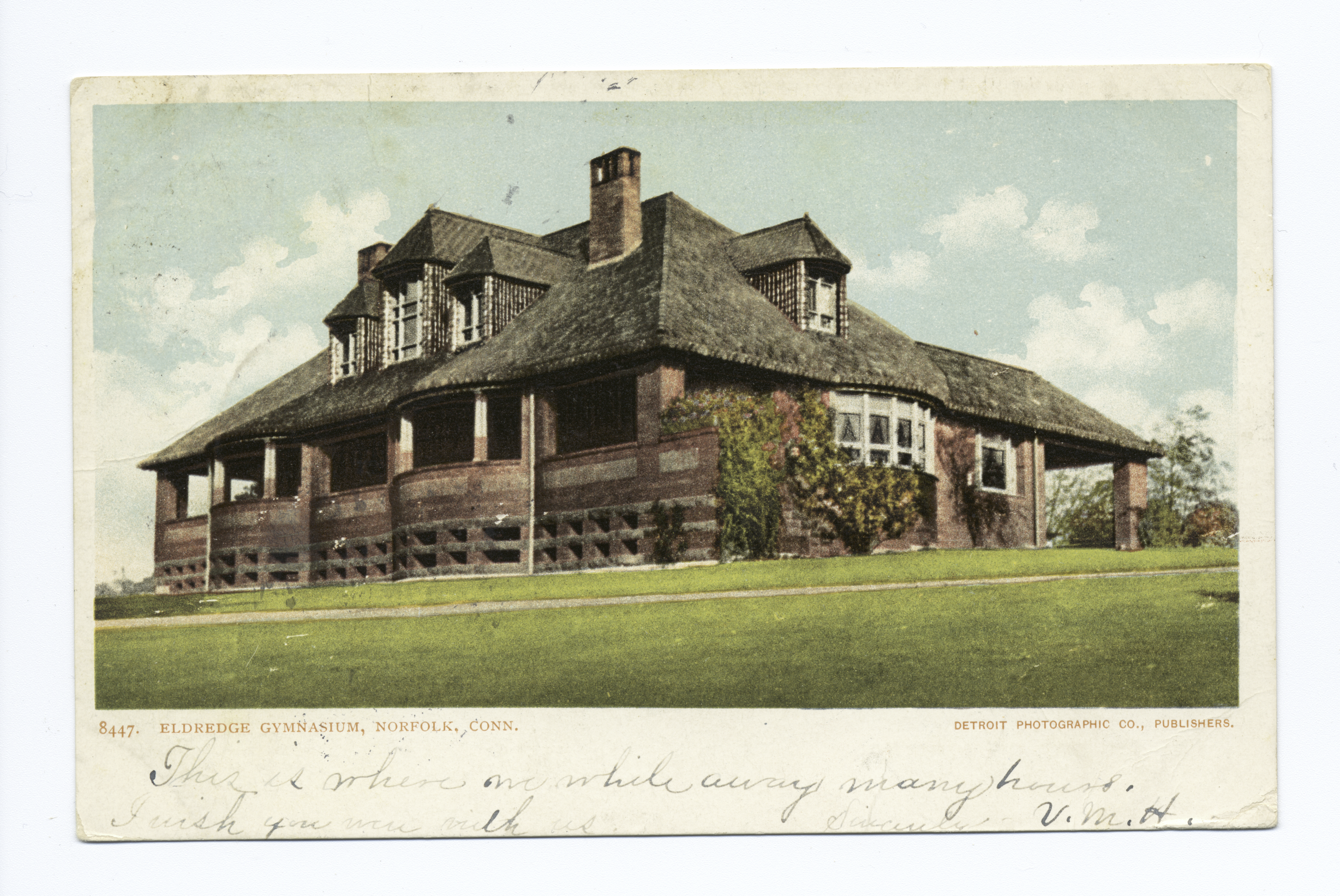
Eldredge Gymnasium in early 20th century postcard, now Town Hall

Norfolk incorporated as a town in 1758. Although the town was named after Norfolk in England, the name of the town may be pronounced various ways by residents.

The Norfolk Historic District includes the historic center of the village of Norfolk.

== Geography ==
According to the United States Census Bureau, the town has a total area of 46.4 square miles (120.2 km^{2}), of which 45.3 square miles (117.4 km^{2}) are land and 1.1 square miles (2.9 km^{2}), or 2.38%, are water. The town is located in the Litchfield Hills portion of the Appalachian mountain range. Norfolk's elevation is 1,230 feet (370 m) above sea level, and the town is sometimes called "the Icebox of Connecticut" for its severe winters and particularly cool summers.

The town is bordered on the west by Canaan and North Canaan, Connecticut; on the north by New Marlborough and Sandisfield, Massachusetts; on the east by Colebrook and Winchester, Connecticut; and on the south by Goshen, Connecticut.

=== Principal communities ===
- Norfolk Center
- North Norfolk
- South Norfolk
- West Norfolk

=== State parks ===
Norfolk is home to three state parks: Dennis Hill State Park, which includes the remnants of a lavish summer pavilion designed by Alfredo Taylor; Haystack Mountain State Park, with a stone tower at the mountain's summit; and Campbell Falls State Park Reserve, with an approximately 100-foot (30 m) natural waterfall.

== Climate ==
According to the Köppen Climate Classification system, Norfolk has a humid continental climate, abbreviated "Dfb" on climate maps. This climatic region is typified by large seasonal temperature differences, with warm to hot (and often humid) summers and cold (sometimes severely cold) winters. On February 16, 1943, the temperature fell to −37 °F (−38 °C), the lowest temperature ever recorded in Connecticut.

Climate data for Norfolk, Connecticut, 1991–2020 normals, extremes 1942–present
Month	Jan	Feb	Mar	Apr	May	Jun	Jul	Aug	Sep	Oct	Nov	Dec	Year
Record high °F (°C)	62 (17)	70 (21)	81 (27)	89 (32)	90 (32)	93 (34)	94 (34)	98 (37)	93 (34)	81 (27)	76 (24)	67 (19)	98 (37)
Mean maximum °F (°C)	52.6 (11.4)	52.0 (11.1)	61.9 (16.6)	77.7 (25.4)	84.0 (28.9)	86.6 (30.3)	88.3 (31.3)	86.6 (30.3)	82.6 (28.1)	72.9 (22.7)	64.7 (18.2)	55.2 (12.9)	90.0 (32.2)
Mean daily maximum °F (°C)	29.8 (−1.2)	32.3 (0.2)	40.4 (4.7)	54.0 (12.2)	65.3 (18.5)	73.4 (23.0)	78.4 (25.8)	76.4 (24.7)	69.0 (20.6)	56.5 (13.6)	44.8 (7.1)	34.6 (1.4)	54.6 (12.5)
Daily mean °F (°C)	21.9 (−5.6)	23.9 (−4.5)	31.6 (−0.2)	44.0 (6.7)	55.3 (12.9)	64.0 (17.8)	69.0 (20.6)	67.3 (19.6)	60.0 (15.6)	48.1 (8.9)	37.5 (3.1)	27.9 (−2.3)	45.9 (7.7)
Mean daily minimum °F (°C)	14.1 (−9.9)	15.4 (−9.2)	22.8 (−5.1)	34.0 (1.1)	45.4 (7.4)	54.5 (12.5)	59.5 (15.3)	58.1 (14.5)	50.9 (10.5)	39.7 (4.3)	30.2 (−1.0)	21.1 (−6.1)	37.1 (2.9)
Mean minimum °F (°C)	−5.7 (−20.9)	−2.0 (−18.9)	4.7 (−15.2)	22.0 (−5.6)	31.6 (−0.2)	41.5 (5.3)	49.8 (9.9)	47.1 (8.4)	36.8 (2.7)	26.6 (−3.0)	15.1 (−9.4)	4.5 (−15.3)	−8.0 (−22.2)
Record low °F (°C)	−22 (−30)	−37 (−38)	−11 (−24)	6 (−14)	24 (−4)	32 (0)	41 (5)	35 (2)	26 (−3)	17 (−8)	3 (−16)	−23 (−31)	−37 (−38)
Average precipitation inches (mm)	3.97 (101)	3.33 (85)	4.21 (107)	3.93 (100)	4.13 (105)	4.96 (126)	4.77 (121)	4.67 (119)	4.90 (124)	5.14 (131)	4.07 (103)	4.86 (123)	52.94 (1,345)
Average snowfall inches (cm)	17.8 (45)	17.5 (44)	14.9 (38)	3.9 (9.9)	0.0 (0.0)	0.0 (0.0)	0.0 (0.0)	0.0 (0.0)	0.0 (0.0)	1.4 (3.6)	4.4 (11)	15.0 (38)	74.9 (189.5)
Average extreme snow depth inches (cm)	11.8 (30)	15.4 (39)	15.8 (40)	5.8 (15)	0.0 (0.0)	0.0 (0.0)	0.0 (0.0)	0.0 (0.0)	0.0 (0.0)	1.1 (2.8)	3.3 (8.4)	9.8 (25)	21.4 (54)
Average precipitation days (≥ 0.01 in)	13.1	11.6	12.4	12.7	14.1	13.0	11.8	11.4	10.4	12.2	11.4	13.8	147.9
Average snowy days (≥ 0.1 in)	9.5	8.8	6.8	2.2	0.1	0.0	0.0	0.0	0.0	0.3	2.8	7.7	38.2
Source 1: NOAA
Source 2: National Weather Service

== Demographics ==
Historical population
Census	Pop.	Note	%±
1820	1,422		—
1850	1,643		—
1860	1,803		9.7%
1870	1,641		−9.0%
1880	1,418		−13.6%
1890	1,546		9.0%
1900	1,614		4.4%
1910	1,541		−4.5%
1920	1,229		−20.2%
1930	1,298		5.6%
1940	1,333		2.7%
1950	1,572		17.9%
1960	1,827		16.2%
1970	2,073		13.5%
1980	2,156		4.0%
1990	2,060		−4.5%
2000	1,660		−19.4%
2010	1,709		3.0%
2020	1,588		−7.1%
U.S. Decennial Census

As of the census of 2000, there were 1,660 people, 676 households, and 461 families residing in the town. The population density was 36.6 inhabitants per square mile (14.1/km^{2}). There were 871 housing units at an average density of 19.2 per square mile (7.4/km^{2}). The racial makeup of the town was 97.11% White, 0.48% African American, 0.24% Native American, 0.54% Asian, 0.60% from other races, and 1.02% from two or more races. Hispanic or Latino of any race were 0.96% of the population.

There were 676 households, out of which 28.0% had children under the age of 18 living with them, 58.3% were married couples living together, 6.5% had a female householder with no husband present, and 31.7% were non-families. 24.6% of all households were made up of individuals, and 10.4% had someone living alone who was 65 years of age or older. The average household size was 2.44 and the average family size was 2.92.

In the town, the population was spread out, with 23.7% under the age of 18, 4.3% from 18 to 24, 29.2% from 25 to 44, 29.0% from 45 to 64, and 13.8% who were 65 years of age or older. The median age was 41 years. For every 100 females, there were 96.4 males. For every 100 females age 18 and over, there were 97.0 males.

The median income for a household in the town was $58,906, and the median income for a family was $67,500. Males had a median income of $41,654 versus $36,442 for females. The per capita income for the town was $34,020. About 1.8% of families and 4.1% of the population were below the poverty line, including 4.3% of those under age 18 and 6.2% of those age 65 or over.

== Education ==
Norfolk is a member of Regional School District 7, which also includes, Barkhamsted, Colebrook, and New Hartford. Public school students attend Botelle Elementary School for grades K–6, Northwestern Middle School for grades 7–8, and Northwestern Regional High School for grades 9–12.

== Transportation ==
The main thoroughfares of the town are U.S. Route 44 (going east–west, also known as Greenwoods Road) and Connecticut Route 272 (going north–south, with 272N also known as North Street and 272S also known as Litchfield Road). US 44 leads west 7 miles (11 km) to North Canaan and southeast 10 miles (16 km) to Winsted, while CT 272 leads south 15 miles (24 km) to Torrington.

== Notable locations ==
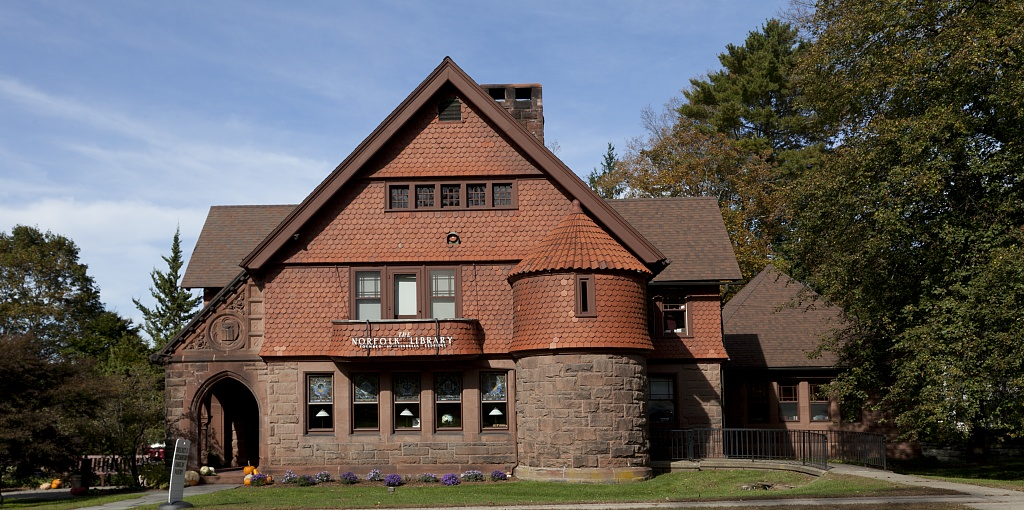
Norfolk Public Library (1888–1889), George Keller, architect

- Blackberry River Inn, built in 1763 and listed on the National Register of Historic Places
- Gould House, listed on the National Register of Historic Places
- Haystack Mountain Tower, built in 1929 and listed on the National Register of Historic Places in 1993
- Hillside, listed on the National Register of Historic Places
- Infinity Hall, an 1883 opera house and concert hall
- Low House, listed on the National Register of Historic Places
- Manor House Inn, also known at the Alders Estate, a restored 1898 Tudor Revival estate oriented around restorative travel, operating as an inn and cultural retreat for artists, musicians, and intellectuals drawn to the Litchfield Hills.
- Norfolk Library, built in 1888–89, a contributing property in Norfolk Historic District
- Rectory and Church of the Immaculate Conception, built in 1924 and added to the National Register of Historic Places in 1982
- Rockwell House, listed on the National Register of Historic Places
- Tom Thumb House, listed on the National Register of Historic Places
- World War I Memorial, listed on the National Register of Historic Places

== Notable people, past and present ==
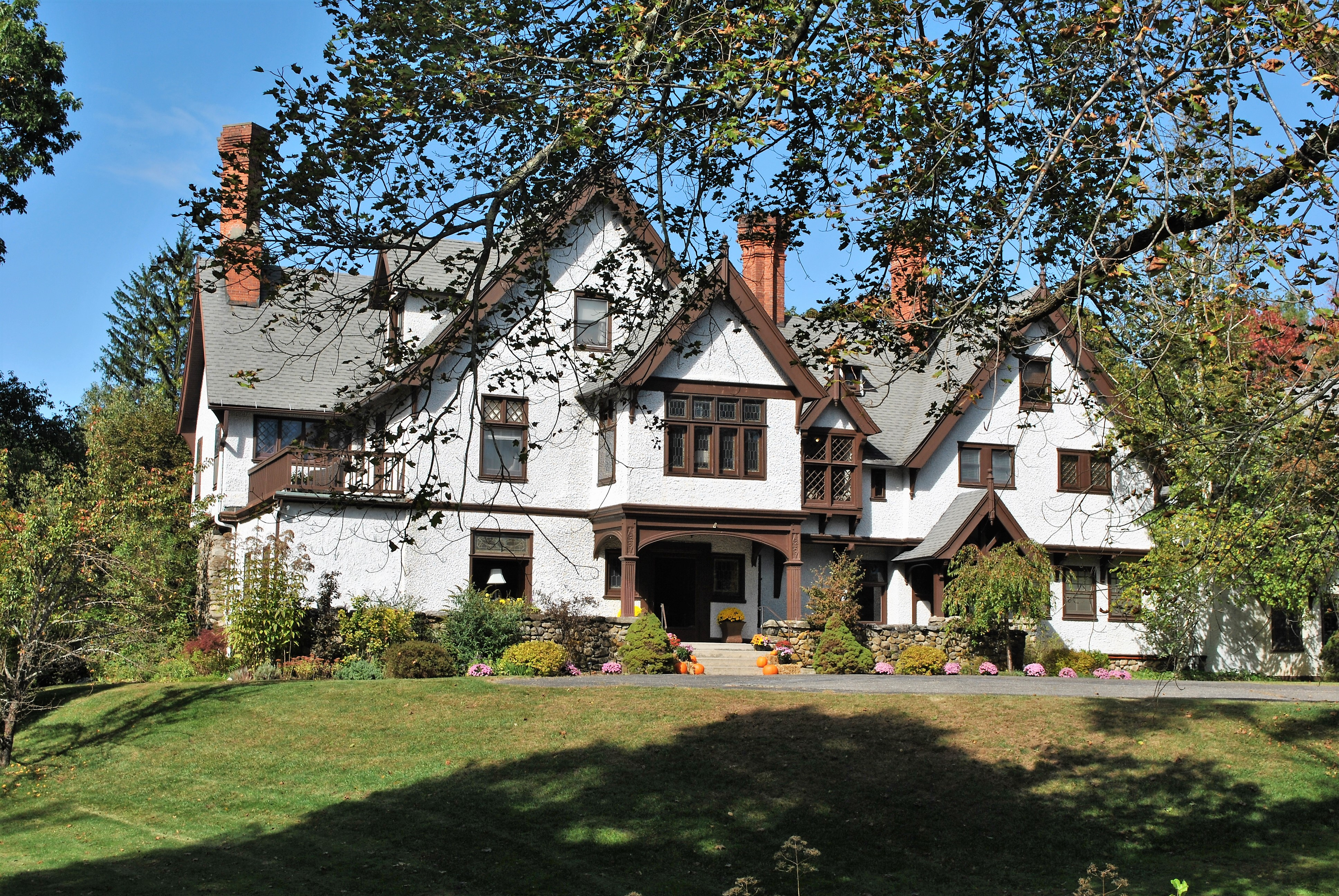
The Alders, built in 1898, designed by Ehrick Rossiter

- Hayden Carruth (1921–2008), published a book of "Norfolk Poems" in 1962
- Joseph Emerson (1821–1900), minister and theologian
- Anne Garrels (1951–2022), NPR foreign correspondent
- Brendan Gill (1914–1997), critic and writer for The New Yorker magazine
- James Laughlin (1914–1997), publisher
- Marie Hartig Kendall (1854–1943), photographer
- Barbara Spofford Morgan (1887–1971), educator, essayist on religion and a specialist in mental testing
- Michael I. Pupin (1858–1935), inventor
- Laura M. Hawley Thurston (1812–1842), poet, teacher
- William Henry Welch (1850–1934), founding dean of the Johns Hopkins University School of Medicine
- William Windom (1827–1891), US senator and United States Secretary of the Treasury
- Emily Adams Bode Aujla, founder and creative director of Bode (fashion brand).

== Nearby Attractions ==
- Haystack Mountain State Park, a public recreation area with hiking trails and a 1,716-foot-high mountain topped with an observation tower
- Campbell Falls State Park, an undeveloped, public recreation area and nature preserve
- Infinity Hall, an American performing arts venue
- Husky Meadows Farm, an organic farm offering CSA (Community-supported agriculture) subscriptions and culinary farm stays
- Norfolk Chamber Music Festival, believed to be the oldest active summer music festival in North America and now managed by the Yale University School of Music

== Bibliography ==
- A. Havemeyer & R. Dance, Alfredo Taylor in Norfolk (Norfolk: Norfolk Hist. Soc., 2005)
- A. Havemeyer & R. Dance, The Magnificent Battells (Norfolk: Norfolk Hist. Soc., 2006)
- T.W. Crissey, History of Norfolk, Litchfield County, Connecticut (Everett, MA: Massachusetts Pub. Co., 1900)
- A.V. Waldecker [ed.], Norfolk, Connecticut 1900–1975 (Norfolk: Norfolk Bicen. Comm., 1976)
