= Chuck Aleksinas =

American basketball player (born 1959)

Personal information
- Born: February 26, 1959 (age 67) Litchfield, Connecticut, U.S.
- Listed height: 6 ft 11 in (2.11 m)
- Listed weight: 260 lb (118 kg)

Career information
- High school: Wamogo (Litchfield, Connecticut)
- College: Kentucky (1977–1979); UConn (1980–1982)
- NBA draft: 1982: 4th round, 76th overall pick
- Drafted by: Chicago Bulls
- Playing career: 1983–1990
- Position: Center
- Number: 50

Career history
- 1983–1984: Estudiantes de Madrid
- 1984–1985: Golden State Warriors
- 1985–1986: Zaragoza
- 1986–1987: OAR Ferrol
- 1987–1990: Gorizia

Career highlights
- NCAA champion (1978); Second-team All-Big East (1981)
- Stats at NBA.com
- Stats at Basketball Reference

Charles John Aleksinas (born February 26, 1959) is an American former professional basketball player. He started his college basketball career for the Kentucky Wildcats and won an NCAA championship as a freshman in 1978. Aleksinas transferred to the UConn Huskies after his sophomore season and was a second-team All-Big East Conference selection in 1981. He was picked in the fourth round of the 1982 NBA draft by the Chicago Bulls but started his career in Spain during the 1983–84 season where he earned the nickname "Asesino" ("assassin" in Spanish) because of his rough play. Aleksinas signed with the Golden State Warriors of the National Basketball Association (NBA) and played for them during the 1984–85 season. He finished his career in Spain and Italy where he played for five seasons.

== High school career ==
Aleksinas was born in Litchfield, Connecticut, and attended Wamogo Regional High School. He averaged 27 points and 14 rebounds per game as a junior on the basketball team. As a senior during the 1976–77 season, Aleksinas averaged 40.1 points, 19 rebounds and 5 blocks per game. He led his team to a 16–8 record and the semifinals of the Class S state semifinals where they lost to Rod Foster and St. Thomas Aquinas High School.

Aleksinas scored 1,916 points during his high school career without playing his freshman year. It is the second highest scoring total of all time in the Berkshire League behind the 2,191 points set by Dave Vigeant of Litchfield High School.

Aleksinas' games during his senior season were frequently attended by college coaches and he estimates that he received between 30 and 40 recruitments letters daily. On April 24, 1977, he committed to play for the Kentucky Wildcats. Upon his recruitment, Wildcats head coach Joe B. Hall claimed Aleksinas "may be the best post prospect we have seen in several years" and "the strongest player we have seen since, before and after Darryl Dawkins."

== College career ==
Aleksinas played behind Mike Phillips and Rick Robey at center during his freshman season with the Wildcats. He appeared in 28 games and averaged 3.5 points and 2.1 rebounds. The Wildcats won the 1978 NCAA Division I basketball tournament.

Aleksinas moved to the starting line-up during his sophomore season and started all 13 games he played. He scored a career-high 20 points against the Syracuse Orange on December 23, 1978. On January 21, 1979, Aleksinas failed to show for practice and it was revealed that team officials had not heard from for two days. Aleksinas was reached at his parents' home in Kentucky by the Hartford Courant and he announced that he had quit the team. Aleksinas felt like he was not being utilised to his best advantage and he had "different philosophies" to head coach Hall. He had been averaging 11.5 points and 6.1 rebounds per game when he left.

On September 7, 1979, it was announced that Aleksinas would transfer to play for the UConn Huskies. He sat out the 1979–80 season as a transfer student. Standing at 6 ft 11 in (2.11 m), Aleksinas was the tallest player in Huskies history. He averaged 12.9 points and 6.1 rebounds per game over his two seasons with the Huskies. Aleksinas was selected to the All-Big East Conference second-team in 1981.

== Professional career ==
Aleksinas was selected by the Chicago Bulls as the 76th overall pick of the 1982 NBA draft. He was released by the Bulls and instead tried to join a team in Europe. Aleksinas started his career with Estudiantes de Madrid during the 1983–84 season where he played alongside Terry Stotts. During a game, Aleksinas collided with an opposition player who suffered a 20-stitch cut in his hand and then knocked down another player by hitting him in the face with his elbow. The crowd started chanting "asesino" which Aleksinas mistook as his own name until he was informed by a teammate that they were calling him the Spanish word for assassin.

On September 21, 1984, Aleksinas signed with the Golden State Warriors of the National Basketball Association (NBA). He played as a reserve during the 1984–85 season.

Aleksinas returned to Spain where he played for Zaragoza in 1985–86 and OAR Ferrol in 1986–87. He finished his career with a stint in Italy.

== Personal life ==
Aleksinas lives in his hometown of Morris, Connecticut, in the same house where he was raised. He operates his own business that specializes in selling rare auto parts.

Aleksinas is of Lithuanian descent. Lithuanian authorities attempted to secure Aleksinas for the national team in 1992 but were denied by FIBA because he did not have a Lithuanian citizenship for at least three years.

== Career statistics ==
Legend
GP	Games played	GS	Games started	MPG	Minutes per game
FG%	Field goal percentage	3P%	3-point field goal percentage	FT%	Free throw percentage
RPG	Rebounds per game	APG	Assists per game	SPG	Steals per game
BPG	Blocks per game	PPG	Points per game	**Bold**	Career high

=== NBA ===
==== Regular season ====
Year	Team	GP	GS	MPG	FG%	3P%	FT%	RPG	APG	SPG	BPG	PPG
1984–85	Golden State	74	4	15.1	.478	.000	.733	3.6	.5	.5	.2	5.1
