= Litchfield High School (Litchfield, Connecticut) =

Location
- 14 Plumb Hill Road; Litchfield, Connecticut 06759; United States
- Coordinates: 41°44′35″N 73°12′25″W

Information
- Type: High school
- Closed: 2024
- School district: Litchfield Public Schools
- CEEB code: 070355
- Dean: Ben Storrs
- Principal: Michael Pascento
- Enrollment: 236 (2020–2021)
- Colors: Blue and White
- Athletics conference: Berkshire League
- Mascot: Cowboy

Litchfield High School was a high school in Litchfield, Connecticut, United States. It was a part of Litchfield Public Schools.

Litchfield High formerly enrolled students from Bantam, Northfield, East Litchfield, and Litchfield. The school gym, designed by Marcel Breuer, is currently featured on the Smithsonian's website for its unique architecture.

On June 29, 2022, Wamogo Regional High School and Litchfield voted to merge their school systems, creating a new Region 20 under the name Lakeview High School. The Litchfield High School building became known as Plumb Hill Middle School (Grades 6-8) as part of Regional School District 20 on July 1, 2024.

== Academics ==
At Litchfield High School, students had access to a comprehensive curriculum that included Advanced Placement courses in literature, calculus, biology, U.S. history, and statistics. The school offered a range of electives including art, music, agriculture, and foreign language.

== Athletics ==
Litchfield High School offered a variety of competitive sports programs for its students. These included soccer, cross country, golf, basketball, track and field, baseball, softball, and tennis. The school was a member of the Berkshire League, and its athletic teams competed against other local high schools in the region.

Wins in CIAC State Championships
| Sport | Class | Year(s) |
|---|---|---|
| Basketball (boys) | C-D | 1925, 1926 |
| Basketball (boys) | S | 1959, 1965 |
| Cross country (girls) | S | 1979, 1992, 1993, 1994, 1995, 1996, 2001, 2002 |
| Field hockey | S | 1996 |
| Soccer (boys) | S | 1963 |
| Tennis (boys) | S | 2018, 2019 |
| Track and field (indoor, boys) | S | 1977, 1979 |
| Track and field (outdoor, girls) | S | 1979, 1980, 1981, 1983 |

== Notable alumni ==
Litchfield High School has produced multiple notable alumni, including:

- BenDeLaCreme: a drag queen, burlesque performer, and comedian who competed on season six of RuPaul's Drag Race and season three of RuPaul's Drag Race All Stars, attended for two years but graduated from a different institution.
