= Northfield, Connecticut =

Rural community in Litchfield, Connecticut, United States

- Unincorporated village
- Welcome sign, Northfield CT

- Location in Connecticut Location in the United States
- Coordinates: 41°41′41.35″N 73°6′38.40″W
- Country: United States
- U.S. state: Connecticut
- County: Litchfield
- Town: Litchfield

Northfield is an unincorporated village in the town of Litchfield, Litchfield County, Connecticut, United States.

The village of Northfield is located in the southeastern corner of Litchfield. Northfield shares an undefined northern boundary with the rest of Litchfield proper; this boundary is roughly coterminous with that of the Northfield Fire District. The village is bordered on the east by the town of Harwinton, on the south by the town of Thomaston, and on the west by the town of Morris. As of the 2010 Census, 1,378 residents reside in the village of Northfield. As part of the town of Litchfield, students in Northfield attend Litchfield Public Schools.

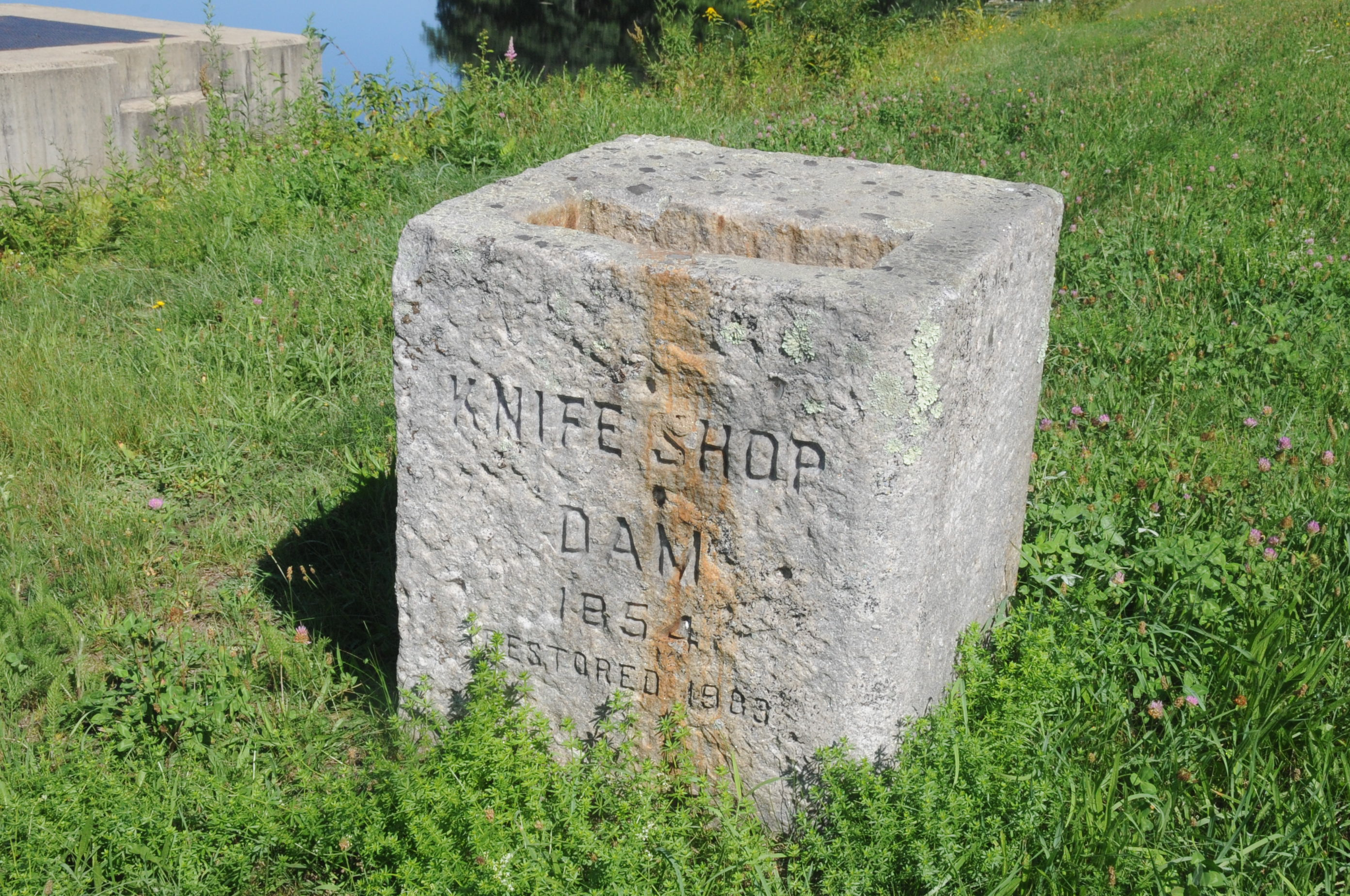
Knife Shop Dam Marker

It is the home of the former Northfield Knife Company, which was founded in 1858 and ceased operations in 1926. The factory was based directly across the street from what is known as Knife Shop Dam. The foundations of the original knife factory still remain, and were listed on the National Register of Historic Places in 1997. Both Northfield Pond and the Knife Shop Dam are part of Humaston Brook State Park. This undeveloped 141 acre state park provides visitors with both hiking and fishing opportunities.

== Notable people ==
- J. Howard Catlin, who in partnership with his brother Franklin built the Northfield Knife Company into one of the most popular knife makers in the world.
- Albert M. Turner, who was the first secretary of the Connecticut Park and Forest Commission, serving in that capacity from 1914 to 1941. He directed the initial acquisition and development program for state parks and forests, establishing the framework of the system as it is known today. Of particular significance were his untiring efforts to secure and develop three shoreline state parks, Sherwood Island, Hammonasset, and Rocky Neck.
- William L. Gilbert, one of the foremost clockmakers of 19th-century Connecticut and a Northfield native.

== Northfield Center ==
The village of Northfield has its own Postal Zip Code, 06778, but has no operating Post Office. The Gilbert Library is located at 38 Main Street. The library was founded by the estate of William L. Gilbert.

Northfield is serviced by a Volunteer Fire Department, the Northfield Volunteer Fire Company, which was chartered in 1938 and resides on Knife Shop Road. The Northfield Volunteer Fire Company has 37 active members, responding to more than 250 emergency calls per year. With its previous location on Main Street, the Northfield Volunteer Fire Department moved to its current location in the 2010s.

== Education and Recreational Sites ==
The Litchfield Montessori School is located on Knife Shop Road, in the building that once housed the Northfield Elementary School. The Litchfield Montessori School was founded in 1972, and moved to its current location in 1979. This school serves children between the ages of 1½ and 12 years of age. There is a public basketball court that borders the school which is very popular with local residents. Multiple outdoor recreational facilities reside within or partially in Northfield, including Humaston Brook State Park, Nystrom's Pond, and Northfield Brook Lake. The residents of Northfield attend Litchfield Public Schools and Lakeview High School (Connecticut).
