= Arthur B. Rickerby =

American photographer

Arthur B. Rickerby (March 15, 1921 – 1972) was an American photographer whose most famous works are his sports photography, especially his color photography essays, and his photographs of the Kennedy administration. His work is most noted for its realism and pioneering use of the 35 mm camera and the early zoom lens.

Rickerby was born on March 15, 1921, in New York City, and died in 1972 at the age of 51 in Danbury, Connecticut. He attended Duke University and worked as a photojournalist. He was married three times, most recently to Wanda A. Rickerby, and had three children: Arthur Jr., Bradford, and David.

== Life ==
=== Youth ===
Arthur B. Rickerby was born in 1921 in Manhattan, New York. His father died when Rickerby was only a toddler. He grew up in the Bronx and attended DeWitt Clinton High School, where he took up photography in the hopes of pleasing his botany teacher, who was the faculty leader of the club. The photography club was where he developed his affinity for the art.

After high school, Rickerby attended Duke University, majoring in political science and government. To help pay his way through school, he took photographs of Duke's victorious sports teams and sold them to local papers. Rickerby's photographs were picked up by ACME publishing (later UPI) for their national coverage of Duke University sports, which started his career.

=== Navy ===
After graduating from Duke, Rickerby joined the US Navy, serving as Lieutenant, Senior Grade, in Captain Edward Steichen's Navy photography unit in World War II. He covered many major events in the Pacific, including "airstrikes on Tokyo and ... the invasions of Iwo Jima and Okinawa". He also photographed the Japanese surrender aboard the USS Missouri. As characterized by his later work, he often shot intimate experiences such as at-sea burials and the lives of Japanese prisoners of war in Guam. Rickerby was promoted to Captain before he left the Navy.

=== Career ===
When he returned to civilian life, Rickerby was invited by ACME/UPI to join its staff. Here he covered China's, Japan's, and Germany's post-war redevelopment, among other projects, which included sports events. It was at this time that he began his use of the 35 mm camera and an early version of the zoom lens, taking arguably his most famous photograph in 1956, that of Don Larsen, of the Yankees, in his record-breaking no-hitter World Series game. Later, Rickerby had a chance to host a "Photography Tour of the Orient" in 1958 for Pan American while on vacation from UPI.

In 1959, Rickerby decided to leave UPI to explore different opportunities as a freelance photographer. His photographs appeared in such notable publications as Sports Illustrated, Sport, and Look, among others. In the 1960s, his photographs appeared in the series "The Face of America" in the Saturday Evening Post.

LIFE magazine hired Rickerby in 1961 to cover the Kennedy administration. Rickerby photographed John F. Kennedy and Robert F. Kennedy in the Oval Office and covered Jacqueline Kennedy's public life, which included her historic trip to India and Pakistan. On the day John F. Kennedy was assassinated, Rickerby rode in the President's motorcade. His most famous photograph from the day of the assassination is of the vice president's limousine outside Parkland Hospital; inside the open limousine, Lady Bird Johnson’s abandoned bouquet of roses lay scattered. Rickerby was later assigned to photograph John F. Kennedy's funeral.

Although LIFE brought him on to cover the Kennedy administration, he continued to cover sporting events, including the Olympics. Rickerby was particularly renowned for his Yankees photographs and his color essays on football. He was also assigned diverse projects such as Queen Elizabeth II's tour of Canada, Nikita Khrushchev's tour across the United States, the Boston Strangler scare, and the trials of Jimmy Hoffa. Five of his photographs made LIFE magazine's cover, including a two-page pullout cover showcasing his color essay "Pro football mayhem: Green Bay Packers and Cleveland Browns"; this color essay became one of his most famous works.

In 1972, LIFE magazine ceased weekly publication and Rickerby was taken off staff and made a contract photographer. Between 1973 and 1977, LIFE published sporadically, averaging two issues a year. In 1978, it began monthly publication. In the 1970s, Rickerby continued to shoot contract assignments for LIFE while freelancing for other publications. His last assignments for LIFE magazine were color coverage of Willie Mays's transition from the San Francisco Giants to the New York Mets on May 26, 1972, and photographs of Doug Rader with the Houston Astros on June 16, 1972. Arthur B. Rickerby died in August 1972.

=== Non-photographic contributions ===
In the 1960s, Arthur B. Rickerby moved to Bethel, Connecticut, and became an active member of and advocate for his community. Rickerby was well known in his town not only for his photography, but also his work on the ABC for Proper Zoning Committee, to which he was elected in November 1971. He was also co-founder and chairman of the Fairfield-Litchfield Environmental Council (FLEC). Both these committees were dedicated to protecting the town's environment, health and esthetic. At various times he was also a member of the Bethel Hills Civic Association and the American Field Service. Dedicated to his town, Rickerby led a successful fight against constructing a 71-mile power line through the Bethel area, which led to the foundation of the Connecticut State Power Facilities Evaluation Council. The extent of his contributions to his community can be seen in the Arthur Rickerby Memorial Award, which was given at the Housatonic Valley Regional High School in Falls Village by the Environmental Commission on behalf of the Ecology League, Inc.

=== Death ===
Arthur B. Rickerby died from pancreatitis in 1972. Despite his extensive photojournalism and good reputation at the time of his death, his work was lost in the vacuum of LIFE magazine's collapse. According to Rickerby's widow, Wanda A. Rickerby, most of the LIFE photographers attended his funeral and the largest flower arrangement was from Teamsters' Union Local No. 5 of Baton Rouge, whose business agent was a key witness against Jimmy Hoffa in the trials that Rickerby covered.

== Contributions and influence ==
Quick to embrace new technologies, Arthur B. Rickerby managed to take his most famous photograph by pioneering the use of the 35 mm camera and early zoom lens. These innovations helped Rickerby pursue his esthetic of up-close and personal photography. His dedication to a more flexible camera and the pursuit of a more natural photojournalism garnered him a nomination for a Pulitzer Prize.

== Awards ==
- Headliner awards:
  - 1952 – Best news feature picture
  - 1958 – Best sports photographer
- National Press Photographers Association Contest at the University of Missouri
  - 1957 First prize in the News Portfolio Division
- White House Press Photographers Prize
  - 1967 picture of Senator Everett Dirksen
- 21st annual Pictures of the Year Competition NPFA
  - 1964 – Certificate of Merit for Superior Achievement
- Pictures of the Year competition at the University of Missouri School of Journalism
  - 1966 Magazine Sports, first place

Rickerby also received a Certification of Recognition from the National Urban League for "photographic excellence for his participation in America’s Many Faces – a search for photographs designed to show the Multi-racial character of America". In 1957, he earned a Pulitzer Prize nomination for 35 mm pioneering and use of the early zoom lens, in particular the photo of Don Larsen pitching the only perfect game in World Series history with the scoreboard in the background.

== Works ==
=== Notable photographs ===
Overall, Rickerby is most famous for his sports photography, especially his color essays, and his portraits of the Kennedy administration. The most famous photograph he published was that of Yankees pitcher Don Larsen pitching the first-ever perfect World series game. His most famous color essay was "the Violence of the Pros" for LIFE magazine.

=== Photographic exhibits ===
- Mid 1960s - One of ten photographers featured in the Baltimore Museum of Art show "Man in Sport"
- One summer - "Rickerby Retrospective" in the National Museum of American History
- 1990 - An exhibit at Pitt's University Art Gallery, Frick Fine Arts Building
- 1992 - "The UPI and LIFE Years, 1941-1971: The Photography of Arthur B. Rickerby" exhibit at the International Center of Photography
- One of his photographs of John F. Kennedy and Robert F. Kennedy is part of the Smithsonian National Portrait Gallery's "Adopt a Portrait" program.
- His photograph of Don Larsen's perfect game hangs in one of the United States Embassies.
- One of his photographs of Carl Yastrzemski hangs in the National Baseball Hall of Fame and Museum

== Notes ==
Information on awards was largely gleaned from the photographer's own papers, including copies of the awards themselves.
