= Bantam, Connecticut =

- Borough
- Borough of Bantam
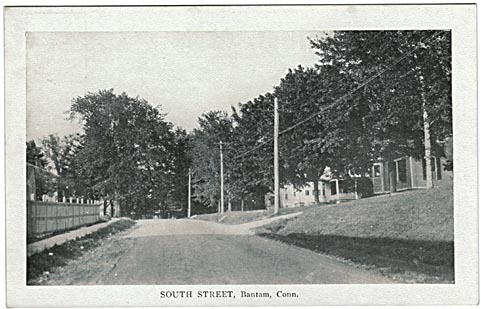
- South Street, about 1910 (postcard picture)

- Location in Litchfield County, Connecticut
- Coordinates: 41°43′24″N 73°14′26″W
- Country: United States
- U.S. state: Connecticut
- County: Litchfield
- Region: Northwest Hills
- Town: Litchfield

Area
  - Total: 1.01 sq mi (2.62 km^{2})
  - Land: 1.01 sq mi (2.62 km^{2})
  - Water: 0 sq mi (0.00 km^{2})
- Elevation: 922 ft (281 m)

Population (2020)
  - Total: 720
  - Density: 719.6/sq mi (277.82/km^{2})
- Time zone: UTC-5 (Eastern (EST))
  - Summer (DST): UTC-4 (EDT)
- ZIP code: 06750
- Area code: 860
- FIPS code: 09-02690
- GNIS feature ID: 0205245
- Website: bantamct.org

Bantam is a borough in Litchfield County, Connecticut, United States. The population was 720 at the 2020 census. It is part of the town of Litchfield.

On July 10, 1989, many of the buildings in Bantam were heavily damaged by a tornado that ripped through Litchfield and New Haven Counties. The storm also caused considerable damage to the Litchfield County town of Thomaston, and to the New Haven County towns of Waterbury, Hamden and North Haven.

== Geography ==
According to the United States Census Bureau, the borough has a total area of 1.0 square mile (2.6 km^{2}), all land.

=== Climate ===
This climatic region is typified by large seasonal temperature differences, with warm to hot (and often humid) summers and cold (sometimes severely cold) winters. According to the Köppen Climate Classification system, Bantam has a humid continental climate, abbreviated "Dfb" on climate maps.

== Demographics ==
Historical population
Census	Pop.	Note	%±
1920	608		—
1930	545		−10.4%
1940	564		3.5%
1950	940		66.7%
1960	833		−11.4%
1970	881		5.8%
1980	860		−2.4%
1990	757		−12.0%
2000	802		5.9%
2010	759		−5.4%
2020	720		−5.1%
U.S. Decennial Census

As of the 2010 census Bantam had a population of 759. The racial composition of the population was 96.6% white, 1.2% black or African American, 0.3% from other races and 1.8% from two or more races. 3.3% of the population was Hispanic or Latino of any race.

At the 2000 census there were 802 people, 364 households, and 202 families residing in the borough. The population density was 793.4 inhabitants per square mile (306.3/km^{2}). There were 376 housing units at an average density of 372.0 per square mile (143.6/km^{2}). The racial makeup of the borough was 96.01% White, 0.37% African American, 0.50% Native American, 0.75% Asian, 0.87% from other races, and 1.50% from two or more races. Hispanic or Latino of any race were 2.00%.

Of the 364 households, 28.0% had children under the age of 18 living with them, 44.2% were married couples living together, 6.9% had a female householder with no husband present, and 44.5% were non-families. 40.1% of households were one person, and 25.0% were one person aged 65 or older. The average household size was 2.20 and the average family size was 3.04.

In the borough the population was spread out, with 25.8% under the age of 18, 3.0% from 18 to 24, 28.8% from 25 to 44, 22.1% from 45 to 64, and 20.3% 65 or older. The median age was 42 years. For every 100 females, there were 83.9 males. For every 100 females age 18 and over, there were 84.8 males.

The median household income was $32,167 and the median family income was $50,938. Males had a median income of $42,000 versus $30,385 for females. The per capita income for the borough was $18,442. About 3.1% of families and 5.4% of the population were below the poverty line, including 3.1% of those under age 18 and 10.3% of those age 65 or over.

Common ancestries reported were: Irish (21.1%), Italian (14.5%), German (14.0%), English (13.1%), French Canadian (10.1%), French (9.7%).

== Education ==
Residents are zoned to Litchfield Public Schools and Lakeview High School (Connecticut).
