= John Lamb (right-handed pitcher) =

American baseball player (born 1946)

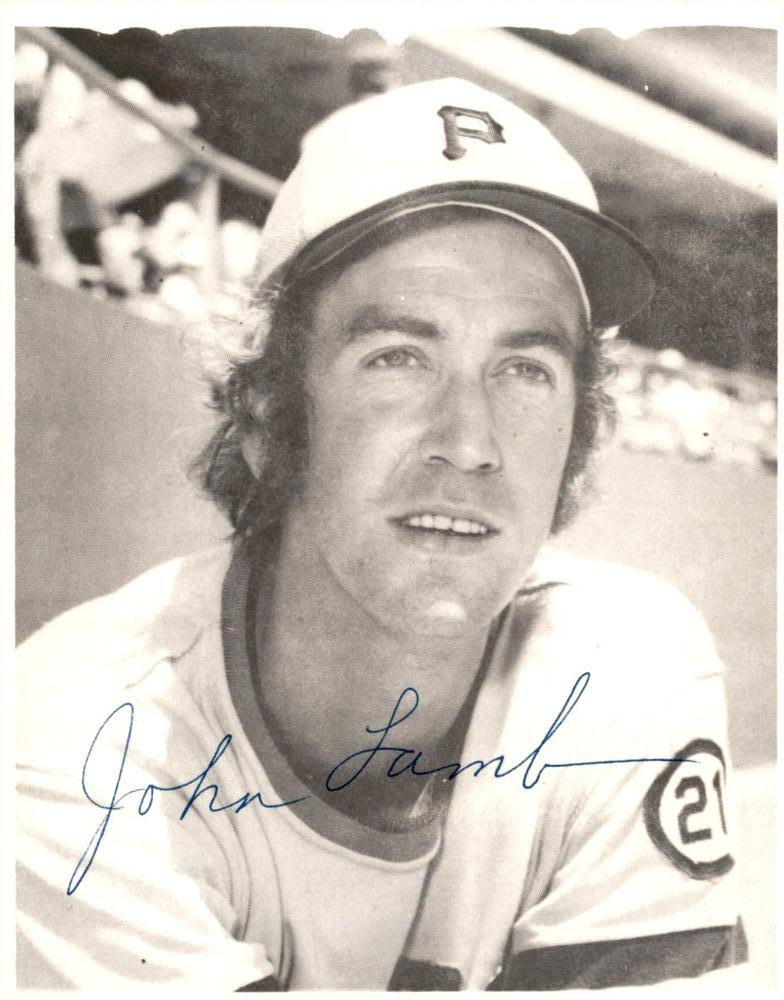
- Relief pitcher
- Born: July 20, 1946 (age 80); Sharon, Connecticut, U.S.
- Batted: Right Threw: Right

MLB debut
- August 12, 1970, for the Pittsburgh Pirates

Last MLB appearance
- September 21, 1973, for the Pittsburgh Pirates

MLB statistics
- Win–loss record: 0–2
- Earned run average: 4.07
- Strikeouts: 36
- Stats at Baseball Reference

Teams
- Pittsburgh Pirates (1970–1971, 1973)

John Andrew Lamb (born July 20, 1946) is an American former professional baseball player and right-handed pitcher who appeared in portions of three seasons in Major League Baseball between 1970 and 1973 as a member of the Pittsburgh Pirates. Born in Sharon, Connecticut, he was listed as 6 feet 3 inches (1.91 m) tall and 180 pounds (82 kg).

Lamb graduated from Housatonic Valley Regional High School — also the alma mater of star Pirates' right-hander and brother-in-law Steve Blass — in 1964. He then entered the Pirates' farm system. In 1969, he enjoyed a breakout season with Salem of the Class-A Carolina League, appearing in 50 games, all in relief, and posting an 11–4 won–lost record and 18 saves, with a sparkling 1.95 earned run average. He followed that campaign with another strong year in 1970, with a combined 6–2 record, 15 saves, and 1.17 earned run average in 39 games in Double-A and Triple-A. He was brought up to Pittsburgh in August for his MLB debut.

When Lamb was recalled, the Pirates were involved in a three-team scramble for the National League East Division championship. Lamb worked in 23 games out of the Bucco bullpen, losing his only decision (September 17 against the Philadelphia Phillies) but collecting three saves. His earned run average was as low as 1.54 through his first 16 outings and 191/3 innings pitched, but he faltered toward the end of the season and finished with a 2.78 ERA. The Pirates captured the division title, but Lamb did not appear in the 1970 National League Championship Series, won by the Cincinnati Reds in three straight games.

In 1971, the Pirates ran the table, winning their division, the National League pennant and the 1971 World Series. Lamb, however, spent most of the year in Triple-A, where he won eight games and saved 11 more for the Charleston Charlies of the International League. He was brought back to Pittsburgh in September as rosters expanded and hurled two scoreless relief appearances, but was not on the Pirates' postseason roster. Lamb then spent all of 1972 with Charleston, and struggled to a 5–9 record and a poor 4.96 ERA. But he turned things around in 1973, winning all six decisions with 12 saves and a 1.66 ERA in 31 games for Charleston, earning one last promotion to the Pirates in midsummer. However, he was largely ineffective, posting two more saves but being tagged with his second MLB loss and putting up a 6.07 earned run average. He ended his professional career with Charleston in 1974, his eleventh straight year in the Pirate organization. All told, Lamb worked in 47 MLB games, all in relief, and allowed 63 hits and 24 bases on balls in 661/3 innings of work, with a career ERA of 4.07. He was credited with five saves.

As of 2020, Lamb was still active in youth baseball, serving as pitching coach for Amenia, New York, High School, and assisting in pitching clinics there.
