= Terryville High School =

High school in Connecticut, US

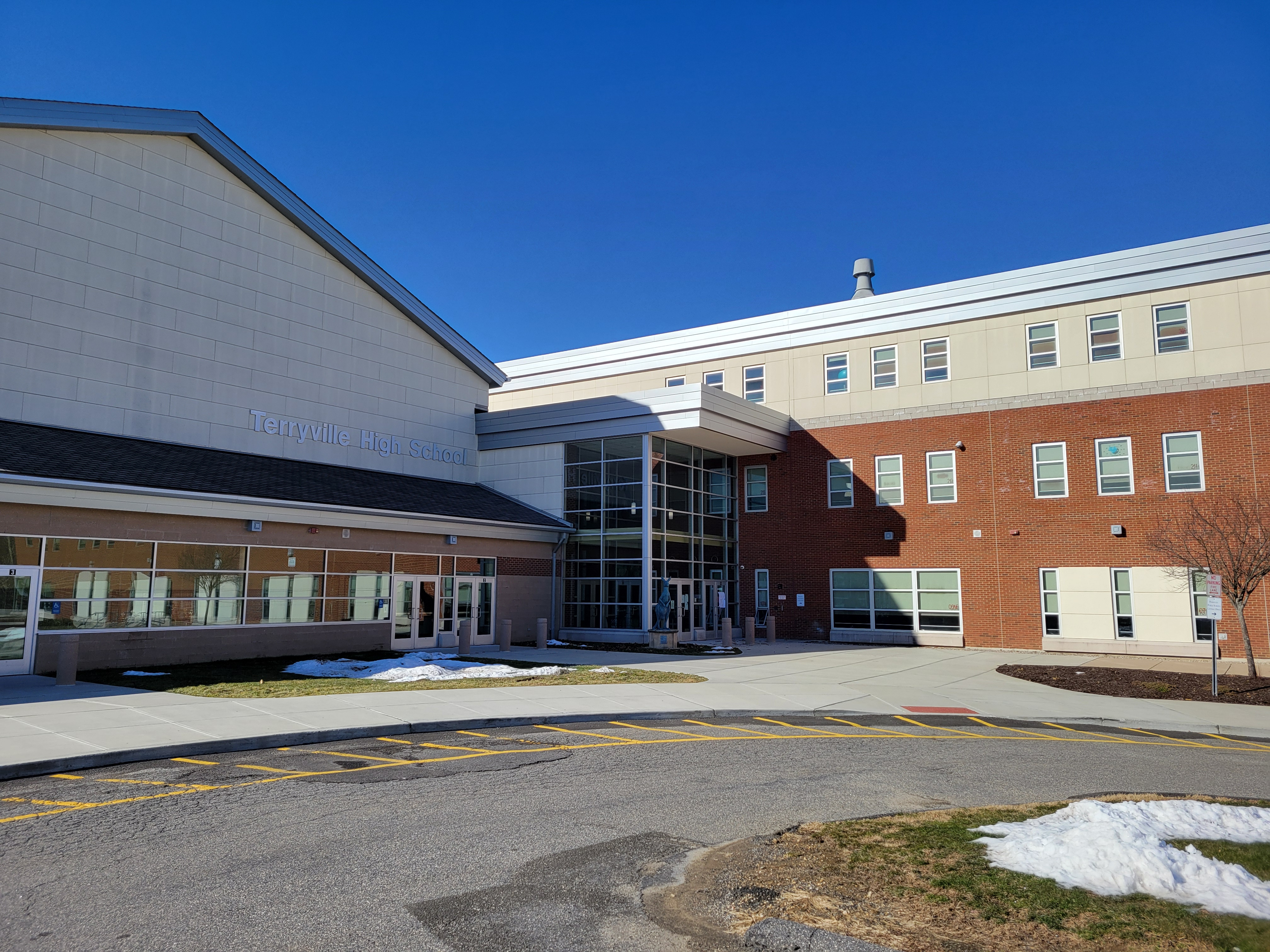

Location
- 33 North Harwinton Avenue; Terryville, Connecticut 06787; United States
- Coordinates: 41°41′22″N 73°01′56″W

Information
- Type: High school
- CEEB code: 070770
- Principal: Michael Hults
- Teaching staff: 32.20 (FTE)
- Grades: 9-12
- Enrollment: 370 (2023–2024)
- Student to teacher ratio: 11.49
- Colors: Black and Orange
- Athletics conference: Berkshire League
- Mascot: Kangaroos
- Website: Official website

Terryville High School is a public high school that serves students living in Plymouth, Terryville, and Pequabuck, Connecticut. It is located at 33 North Harwinton Avenue in Terryville, Connecticut. It is the only school in town to offer grades 9−12. Originally located at former Prospect St School then, located at the site of what is now Eli Terry Jr. Middle School, a new Terryville High School building was completed and opened in January 2008.

== Sports ==
Terryville High School has a wide variety of athletic activities; school sports include baseball, softball, boys' and girls' basketball, boys' and girls' soccer, cross country, tennis, volleyball, track and field, golf, and wrestling.

Its gymnasium is adorned with banners representing many years of athletic achievements. Historic sports moments for Terryville include six state basketball championships. Art Hamm coached the team to Connecticut state high school basketball championship victories in 1983 and 1984.

Wins in CIAC State Championships
Sport	Class	Year(s)
Baseball	S	1955
Basketball (boys)	D	1928
Basketball (boys)	S	1936, 1954, 1983, 1984, 1995
Cross country (boys)	S	1985
Softball	S	2010
