= Litchfield County Jail =

Former prison in Connecticut, United States

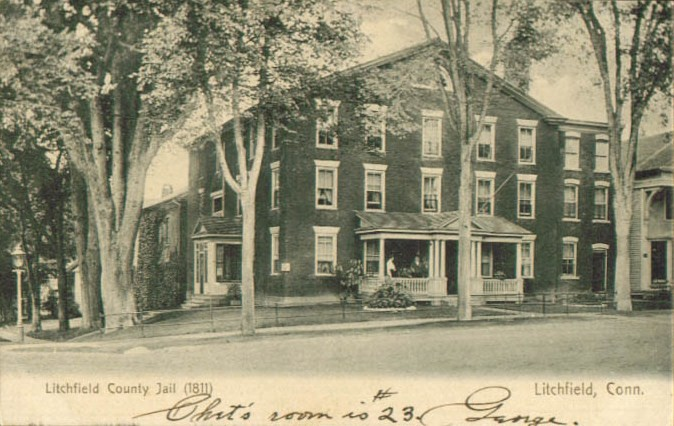
Litchfield County Jail, 1907

The 1812 Litchfield County Jail is a former correctional facility in Litchfield, Connecticut. It is the town's oldest public building and a former jail.

== History ==
The facility, controlled by the Connecticut state government, historically held inmates convicted of minor offenses, and it had a capacity of 120 prisoners. Bill Ryan of The New York Times wrote that Litchfield Jail "is part of the lore of Litchfield" and that "For generations, the reputation of the jail was that of a country club of penal institutions where the living was positively easy." The first portion of the building was constructed in 1812 with subsequent additions in 1846 and 1890. The jail was originally operated by Litchfield County when Litchfield was the county seat of government. After 1960, when Connecticut dissolved county governance, the jail property was absorbed and operated by the State of Connecticut.

The prison held British people during the War of 1812. In the early 20th century an addition was built joining Litchfield Jail to the First National Bank of Litchfield, an 1816 structure.

In a period before the 1990s, the state began allowing many prisoners into the facility, and it reached capacity. A prisoner escaped the prison, stabbed a guard, and held a man from the State of New York as a hostage, so the state government removed the violent prisoners and made it a drug treatment center for male inmates in 1992. The prisoner capacity was reduced to 30. Governor of Connecticut Lowell P. Weicker Jr. ordered the facility closed for financial reasons in 1993.

It was converted into the McAuliffe Manor, a substance abuse treatment center for women operated by Naugatuck Valley HELP Inc., holding women who were convicted of drug-related crimes who would have otherwise been sent to Connecticut state prisons. In 2009 the contract between Naugatuck Valley HELP Inc. and the state expired, leading to the closure of McAuliffe Manor.

In 2010, the state government made the jail property available for purchase. The Town of Litchfield refused multiple offers to take the former jail for free on the grounds of the costs and potential risks of owning the facility. In 2013 the state government sold the facility for $130,000 to Russell Barton, a businessperson and real estate investor from the area.

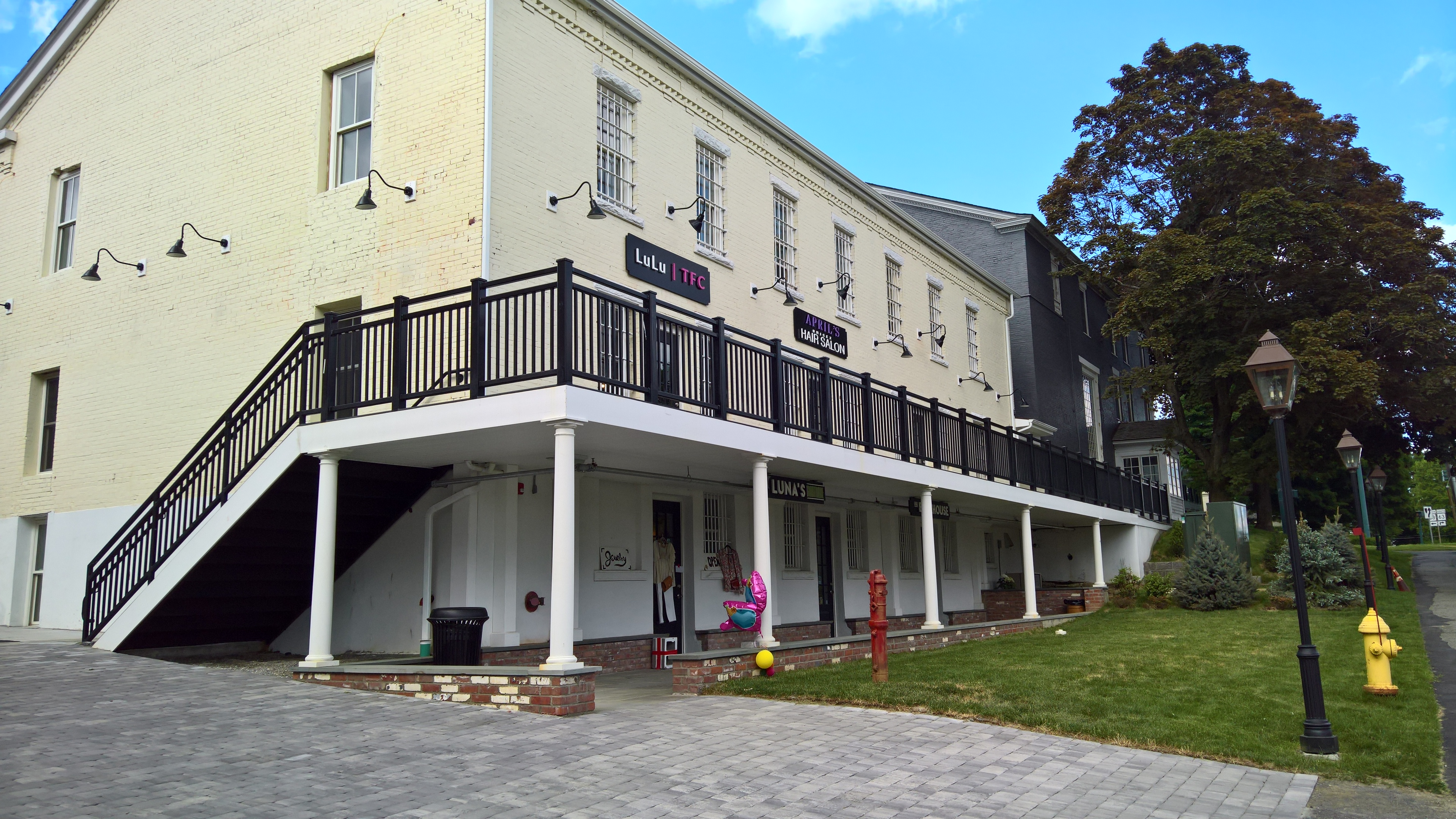
Elevated walkway on south side. Architect: Milton Gregory Grew, AIA

Russell Barton commissioned architect Milton Gregory Grew, AIA of Woodbury, CT to design the rehabilitation and adaptive reuse of the building. While there was much discussion among town residents as to what would be the most appropriate reuse of the building, Barton and Grew determined that a mix of residential and business uses would be most appropriate, allowing new residents to live in the center of town and enhance the variety of businesses around the Litchfield Green. The exterior design was to be a controversial matter because a jail is not built to attract visitors. Barton, his partners, and architect Milton Gregory Grew, AIA attended many meetings with the Borough of Litchfield Historic District Commission reviewing design proposals. The Historic District Commission eventually approved Grew's design for an elevated walkway and ground level terrace to allow pedestrian access to the building on the side facing the Green. In addition, Grew added exterior stairs and walkway and a detached elevator to the rear courtyard to provide greater access to all portions of the building, including accessibility for the disabled. Barton, Grew and the development team also made presentations and received approvals from the Litchfield Zoning Board of Appeals and Planning and Zoning Commission for the proposed uses, site development and building modifications. As construction came to a close in late 2018, the building had been converted to four luxury residential apartments, two financial advisory firms, a bakery, several boutiques, and a popular restaurant.

== Note ==
- Content originally posted in Litchfield, Connecticut
