= Thomaston High School =

Location
- 185 Branch Road; Thomaston, Connecticut 06787; United States
- Coordinates: 41°39′33″N 73°05′45″W

Information
- Type: High school
- Motto: "Live to learn, learn to live"
- CEEB code: 070775
- Principal: Cristina Kingsbury
- Faculty: 30
- Grades: 7-12
- Enrollment: 295 (2023-2024)
- Colors: Gold and brown
- Athletics conference: Berkshire League
- Mascot: The Golden Bear
- Yearbook: The Owl
- Website: ths.thomastonschools.org

Thomaston High School is a public school for grades 7 through 12 in Thomaston, Connecticut. The school has an enrollment of about 350 students.

== Athletics ==
=== Accomplishments ===
The Thomaston High School boys' cross country team has won the Berkshire League Title 8 times (1972, 1973, 2000, 2004, 2005, 2006, 2007, and 2008). They have won Connecticut Class S State Championship title 5 times (1973, 2000, 2005, 2006, 2007). The team has recorded wins at multiple state invitationals such as the Windham, Coginchaug, and Nonnewaug invites while going undefeated several seasons. The team has also accomplished a new Berkshire League Record with 59 straight wins. The girls' cross country team has recorded multiple 10–0 seasons, with their latest in 2011. The girls' team has begun having its own success in the Berkshire League, winning five straight league titles (2007, 2008, 2009, 2010, and 2011). In 2010, they won their first Class S State Championship and, at the State Open a week later, qualified for the New England Championship in Thetford, Vermont, where they completed their season with an 8th-place finish. The girls' team repeated this feat in 2011, winning the Class S State Championship over Immaculate High School while simultaneously qualifying for the New England Championship in North Scituate, Rhode Island, where they finished 13th.

Wins in CIAC State Championships
Sport	Class	Year(s)
Baseball	S	2008
Basketball (boys)	S	1962, 1990, 1991
Basketball (girls)	S	1993, 2014, 2015, 2022
Cross country (boys)	S	1973, 2000, 2005, 2006, 2007, 2025
Cross country (girls)	S	2010, 2011, 2019
Field hockey	S	2015
Softball	S	2014

== Controversy ==
The school was in the news in 1998 when it expelled a student caught smoking marijuana off school grounds. The case raised issues concerning the extent that schools can police students' lives. The expulsion was appealed to Connecticut State Supreme Court, which ruled that students could be expelled if their off site behavior "markedly interrupts or severely impedes the day-to-day operation of the school." The student was reinstated and filed a lawsuit against Thomaston after graduation.
