= Humaston Brook State Park =

State park in Litchfield County, Connecticut

- Location within Connecticut Location within the United States
- Location: Litchfield, Connecticut, United States
- Coordinates: 41°42′04″N 73°06′25″W
- Area: 147 acres (59 ha)
- Elevation: 686 ft (209 m)
- Established: 1920
- Administrator: Connecticut Department of Energy and Environmental Protection
- Designation: Connecticut state park
- Website: Official website
- Northfield Knife Company Site
- U.S. National Register of Historic Places
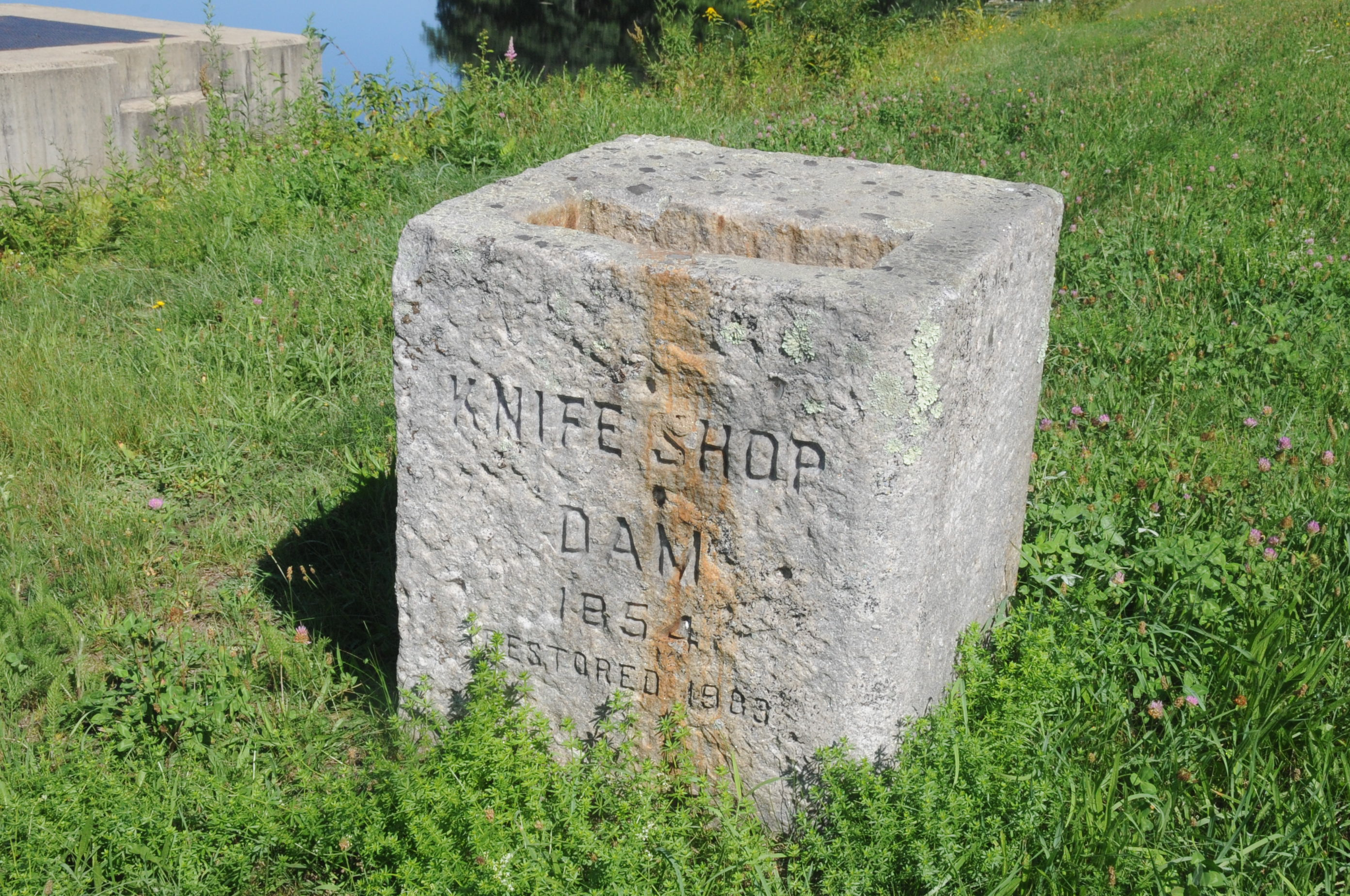
- Marker at the dam
- Location: Knife Shop Road, Litchfield, Connecticut
- Area: less than one acre
- Built: 1858
- NRHP reference No.: 97000275
- Added to NRHP: April 8, 1997

Humaston Brook State Park is an under-developed day use state park located in the village of Northfield, Connecticut. It preserves a stretch of Humaston Brook, a tributary of the Naugatuck River. Its major feature is Northfield Pond, created by damming in the 19th century. It is commonly known by residents as Knife Shop Pond. It also includes the foundations of the former Northfield Knife Company located along the banks of the brook below the dam, which was the location of one of Litchfield's largest 19th-century employers. Activities in the park include hiking and fishing.

== Setting and features ==
Humaston Brook State Park is located in southern Litchfield, just east of the cluster of buildings making up the village of Northfield at the junction of Knife Shop Road and Route 254. The park's lands extend north from Knife Shop Road nearly to Richards Road Extension, and south from Knife Shop Road to include a gorge on Humaston Brook. Knife Shop Road crosses Humaston Brook on a bridge just south of the dam at the southern end of Northfield Pond, and there is a parking area extending a short way on Newton Road on the east side of the pond just north of Knife Shop Road. A third parcel of parkland is located east of Newton Road, between Hopkins and Knife Shop Roads.

A hiking trail provides access to the cascades and factory ruins south of Knife Shop Road.

== History ==
Humaston Brook was dammed in 1854 to provide water power to a carriage manufacturer. J. Howard Catlin purchased the factory and its water rights in 1858 with his brother Franklin as a site for their knife company. The company became one of the nation's leading manufacturers of knives, its wares displayed at various world fairs between 1876 and 1901. The Catlins sold the company in 1919. The state acquired the property in 1926. A one-acre site encompassing the knife factory remains was listed on the National Register of Historic Places in 1997.

Preservation of the site as a state park began with the acquisition of a seven-acre tract in 1920, the purchase being made with the assistance of the White Memorial Foundation and Northfield resident Henry Peck.
