= Rhone American Cemetery and Memorial =

ABMC cemetery in Alpes-Côte d'Azur, France

- American Battle Monuments Commission
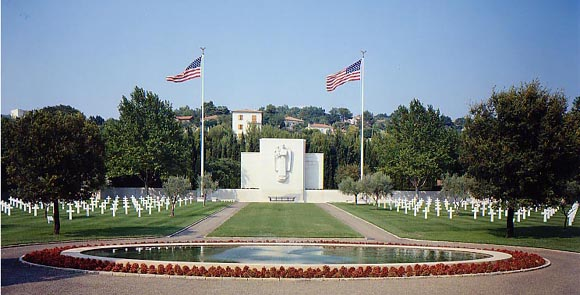
- View of headstones and memorial
- Used for those deceased 1944–1946
- Established: August 1944 (completed 1956)
- Location: 43°32′12″N 6°28′24″E near Draguignan, Var, France
- Designed by: Henry J. Toombs, Atlanta (Monument); A. F. Brinckerhoff, New York (Landscaping)
- Total burials: 861
- Unknowns: 62
- Commemorated: 294

Burials by nation
- United States: 861

Burials by war
- World War II: 861

Rhone American Cemetery and Memorial is a Second World War American military war grave cemetery, located within the city of Draguignan, 42 km (26 mi) north of Saint-Tropez, in Southern France. The cemetery, named for the Rhone river where most of those interred fought and died, was dedicated in 1956, and contains 858 American war dead and covers 12.5 acres (5.1 ha). It is administered by the American Battle Monuments Commission.

== History ==
Those interred died mostly in the summer of 1944 during Operation Dragoon, the Allied invasion of southern France from the Mediterranean, which followed the Allied invasion of Normandy. This operation was designed to open a second beachhead and Allied combat zone in France, threatening the Axis units confronting the Normandy combat zone, and thus to accelerate the Allied drive into Western Europe. Those interred were mainly part of the U.S. Seventh Army, in particular the US 45th Infantry Division, the US 36th Infantry Division, and the US 3rd Infantry Division.

== Layout ==
The cemetery, created 19 August 1944, has headstones arranged in straight lines, divided into four plots, and grouped around an oval pool. Small gardens are placed at each end of the cemetery which is overlooked by a chapel. Within the chapel are decorative mosaics, murals (by Austin M. Purves Jr.) and sculptured figures. Between the chapel and the graves, a bronze relief map details US military operations in the region. On a wall of the terrace, 294 names of those missing in action are inscribed (rosettes mark those since recovered and identified).
