= Berkshire League =

High school athletic conference in Connecticut, US

- Conference: CIAC
- No. of teams: 8
- Region: Litchfield County

The Berkshire League is a 8-team athletic conference of high schools, located in Litchfield County, Connecticut.

The Berkshire League is a member of the Connecticut Interscholastic Athletic Conference (CIAC).

== Teams ==
The Berkshire League is made up of eight member schools from around Litchfield County. The schools tend to be smaller regional schools and the league encompasses all public schools from the county with the exception of New Milford High School, Torrington High School and Watertown High School.

Lewis S. Mills High School was a member until the 2019-2020 season, when they decided to join the Central Connecticut Conference due to concerns about declining enrollment and sports-participation at the other schools.

Litchfield High School and Wamogo Regional High School merged following the culmination of the 2023-2024 school year.

=== Coop sports ===
For football, a majority of the Berkshire leagues schools compete as co-ops to field a team. Northwest United consists of Nonnewaug, Oliver Wolcott Technical, Shepaug and Lakeview high schools. Gilbert, Northwestern, and Housatonic compete as GNH, an acronym for the three member schools.

In ice hockey, Shepaug Valley, Nonnewaug and Thomaston compete as a co-op. Housatonic Regional, Northwestern, Torrington and Lakeview compete as the other co-op.

== Berkshire League Member Schools ==
| School name | Location | Nickname | Colors | Rival |
|---|---|---|---|---|
| Gilbert School | Winsted, Connecticut | Yellow Jackets | | Housatonic Valley Regional High School & Northwestern Regional High School |
| Housatonic Valley Regional High School | Canaan, Connecticut | Mountaineers | | Gilbert School |
| Lakeview High School | Litchfield, Connecticut | Bobcats | | N/A |
| Nonnewaug High School | Woodbury, Connecticut | Chiefs | | Shepaug Valley School |
| Northwestern Regional High School | Winsted, Connecticut | Highlanders | | Gilbert School |
| Shepaug Valley School | Washington, Connecticut | Spartans | | Nonnewaug High School |
| Terryville High School | Plymouth, Connecticut | Kangaroos | | Thomaston High School |
| Thomaston High School | Thomaston, Connecticut | Golden Bears | | Terryville High School |

=== Former members ===
| School | Location | Nickname | Colors | Conference/Status |
|---|---|---|---|---|
| Lewis S. Mills High School | Burlington, Connecticut | Spartans | | Central Connecticut Conference |
| Litchfield High School | Litchfield, Connecticut | Cowboys | | Merged to form Lakeview High School |
| Wamogo Regional High School | Litchfield, Connecticut | Warriors | | Merged to form Lakeview High School |

== Sports ==
The Berkshire League offers varsity sports in three seasons: fall, winter, and spring.

Fall sports

- Girls' volleyball
- Boys' soccer
- Girls' soccer
- Boys' cross country
- Girls' cross country
- Girls' Field Hockey

Winter sports

- Boys' basketball
- Girls' basketball
- Girls' swimming
- Boys' swimming

Spring sports

- Baseball
- Softball
- Boys' outdoor track
- Girls' outdoor track
- Boys' tennis
- Girls' tennis
- Golf

== Notable alumni ==
Evan Scribner

Dominic Dao

Dimmy Tonovan

Daniel Dieck

Hunter Martocchio

Hans Hilpertshauser
