= Housatonic Valley Regional High School =

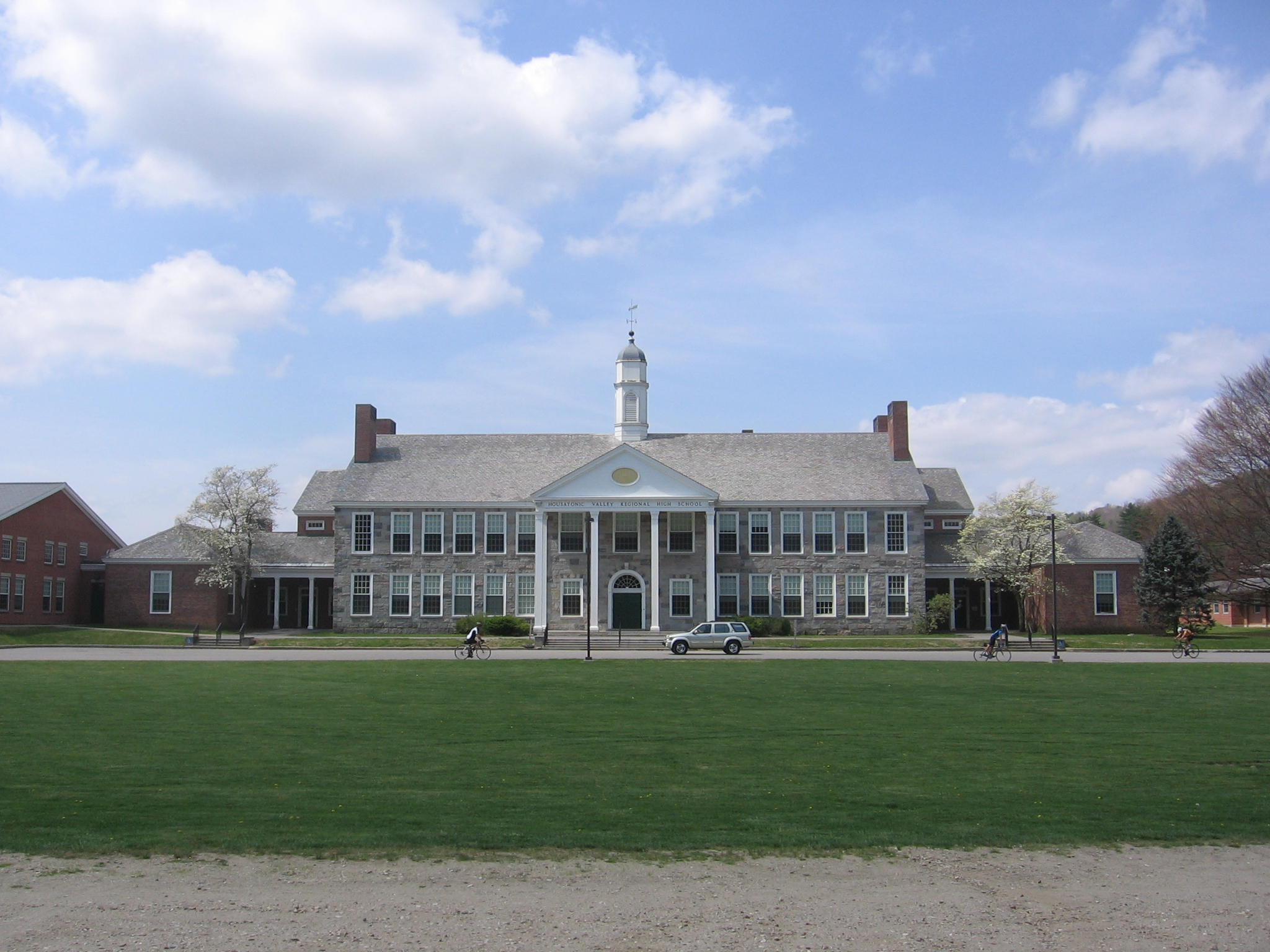
- Cyclists in front of school, April 21, 2012

Location
- 246 Warren Turnpike Road; Falls Village, Connecticut 06031; United States; 41°56′15″N 73°21′34″W

Information
- Other name: HVRHS
- Type: Public high school
- Established: 1939 (87 years ago)
- School district: Regional School District 1
- CEEB code: 070205
- NCES School ID: 090360000766
- Principal: Ian Strever
- Teaching staff: 36.20 (on an FTE basis)
- Grades: 9–12
- Enrollment: 308 (2023-2024)
- Student to teacher ratio: 8.51
- Colors: Blue and Gold
- Athletics conference: Berkshire League
- Mascot: Mountaineer
- Nickname: Mountaineers
- Publication: The Acorn
- Newspaper: The Northwest Corner
- Yearbook: The White Oak
- Website: www.hvrhs.org

Housatonic Valley Regional High School (HVRHS) is a public high school in Falls Village, Connecticut, United States. The high school serves the six towns of the Region 1 School District, comprising the towns of Canaan, Cornwall, Kent, North Canaan, Salisbury and Sharon. It was established in 1939 as a result of a special act of the Connecticut General Assembly in 1937. It is the first regional high school in New England.

== History ==
Prior to the opening of Housatonic Valley Regional High School, four of the six towns it currently serves each had its own high school. In the 1920s, William Teague, the state's rural supervisor of schools, suggested that Connecticut's sprawling Northwest Corner consolidate its public schools. In 1937, the Connecticut General Assembly authorized the formation of the first regional school district in the state (hence the name of the new district, "Regional School District Number One"). The newly formed board of education purchased the 75-acre (300,000 m^{2}) former Lorch farm at the junction of the Salmon Kill and the Housatonic River near the Canaan-Salisbury town line for $8,000. The school was subsequently constructed on that site, opening in the fall of 1939.

In 2001, the school facility expanded; adding a new agricultural education center, library, and updated science labs. The school facility includes one gymnasium, an auditorium, a cafeteria and dozens of classrooms. The school sat under the shadow of a white oak, from which the yearbook The White Oak takes its name. The historic White Oak was so badly damaged in a storm on Monday, July 5, 2004, shortly after the arrival of previous principal Gretchen Foster, that it was taken down. The School also has two other courtyards: the Sophomore Courtyard located near the cafeteria, and the Faculty Courtyard (formerly Freshman courtyard). In 2007, HVRHS became the North American Champions of the Canon Envirothon competition.

In early 2008, a plan was unveiled to renovate the former Clarke B. Wood Agricultural Center on campus. Part of that building, closed in 2001 after construction of a new Agriculture Center, has been turned into the artgarage, an afterschool activity center. The main part of that building was renovated into the Mahoney-Hewat Science and Technology Center, containing areas for extended curriculum activities needing more space than in the school's science laboratories and includes permanent space for the high school's robotics team (FIRST # 716), electric vehicle construction, a conference room with space for the Alumni Association activities, a business office for the 21st Century organization and various displays and supplies. The renovations were completed late 2012 and will serve not only high school students but all the CT Region One School District schools and students.

== Curriculum ==
In addition to the standard high school curricula, the school offers a variety of elective classes including drawing, color and design, painting, photography, pottery, sculpture, wood technology, metal technology, drafting, and a wide array of courses in agriculture.

== Athletics ==
Housatonic supports a large number of sports in comparison to other schools in its league. Housatonic has earned three state championships; Girls Track (1985 and 1988) and Division IX Golf (2007). Its notable alumni to continue on to professional sports careers are John Lamb and Steve Blass, both Major League Baseball pitchers for the Pittsburgh Pirates. Blass was drafted out of HVRHS, and pitched in the 1971 World Series. He is currently a sportscaster for the Pirates.

The Housatonic mascot is The Mountaineer. The school's colors are royal blue and gold, and it is a member of the Berkshire League (it is a member of the Pequot Uncas for football). The school has the following sports:

=== Boys' sports ===
Fall

- Football-first year of 11 man football was 1953 and that team was undefeated
- Soccer (Berkshire League Champions 2005, Berkshire League Runners-up 2010, 2011, 2012)
- Cross-Country

Winter

- Basketball
- Hockey
- Swimming
- Wrestling
- Alpine Skiing

Spring

- Baseball
- Track and Field
- Tennis
- Lacrosse
- Golf

=== Girls' sports ===
Fall

- Soccer (Class S Runners-up 2014)
- Cross Country (Class S Runners-up 2016, Berkshire League Runners-up 2015, 2016)
- Volleyball (Berkshire League Champions 2007)
- Field Hockey

Winter

- Basketball (Berkshire League Champions 2007-08)
- Swimming
- Alpine Skiing (CHAMPS 2007-08)

Spring

- Softball
- Track (Berkshire League Runner-ups 2016)
- Tennis
- Lacrosse
- Golf

Wins in CIAC State Championships
Sport	Class	Year(s)
Golf (boys)	IV	2007
Track and field (outdoor, girls)	S	1985, 1988

== Notable alumni ==
- Steve Blass, former MLB player
- James J. Casey, politician
- Ron Garney, comic book artist
- John Lamb, former MLB player
- Jim Lawson, comic book artist
- Peter Reilly, charged in 1973 at then 18 with the murder of his mother, Barbara Gibbons, whose case became the subject of both the 1976 true crime novel, A Death in Canaan, and the 1978 made for television movie named for and about it.
