= Austin M. Purves Jr. =

Austin Purves
- Born: December 31, 1900; Philadelphia, Pennsylvania
- Died: March 15, 1977 (aged 76)
- Known for: Painting, mosaics, sculpture, fresco, arts educator

Austin Montgomery Purves Jr. (December 31, 1900 – March 15, 1977) was an American artist and educator. His works include painting, mosaic, fresco, and sculpture.

Among his most notable works were the mural decoration of the World War II Rhone American Cemetery and Memorial in Draguignan, France; bas reliefs for the SS America, the SS United States, and Grace Line ships Santa Rosa and Santa Paula; mosaic work located in the East Apse of the National Shrine of the Immaculate Conception in Washington, DC.; the decorative map in the Boston Federal Reserve Bank; and the spandrel sculpture on the barracks at the United States Military Academy, West Point, New York.

== Life ==
The Queen of Hearts, 1912. Maxfield Parrish, a friend of the Purves family, encouraged Austin in his artwork. Purves created The Queen of Hearts when he was 12 years old.

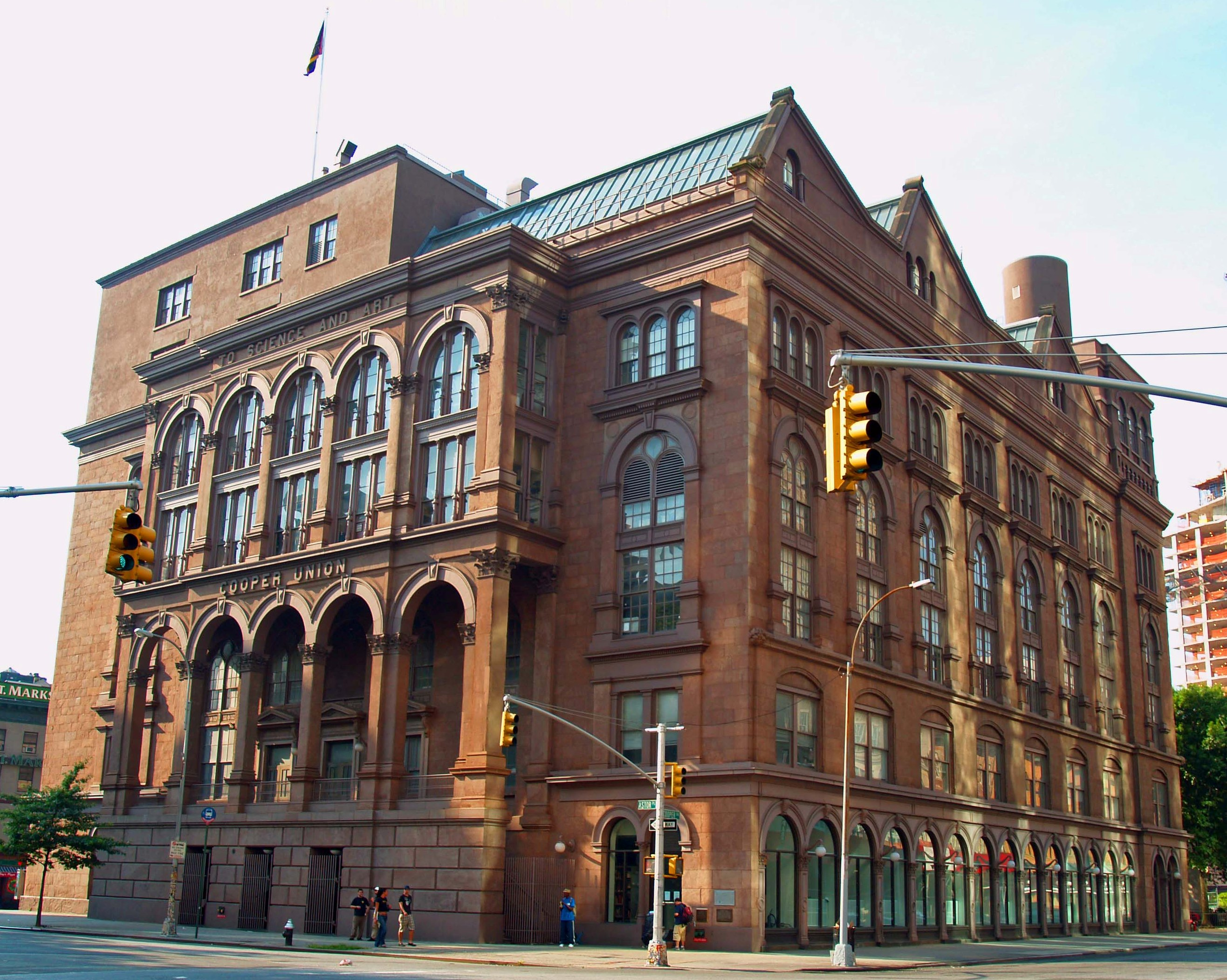
Cooper Union in New York where Austin Purves was director from 1931 to 1938

Purves was born on December 31, 1900, in Philadelphia, Pennsylvania, the son of Austin M. Purves Sr., a financier and patron of the arts, and Betsey Preston Coleman Purves. He graduated from the Germantown Friends School in 1918. He wanted to be an artist from early childhood, later studying art at the Pennsylvania Academy of Fine Arts and the Julian Academy in Paris, France. He studied fresco painting at the American Conservatory in Fontainebleau, France, and traveled in Scandinavia, France, and Italy, studying frescos in churches and municipal buildings. He received an award from the Department of Beaux Arts of France and an honorable mention from the Architectural League of New York for frescoes that he painted in a 13th-century church in Montarlot, France.

Returning to the United States after his studies, he married and lived in New York, where he had a studio on the Lower East Side. He married his second cousin, Ellen Tybout Wood. Though her family was originally from Delaware, she grew up on Long Island. During his early married life, he worked for the design department at R. H. Macy's for a year and then found work painting murals for private homes.

He became the director of the Day and Night Schools at Cooper Union from 1931 to 1938, remaining for seven years. The 1934 Jubilee Issue of the Cooper Union Yearbook held this dedication: "To Austin Purves Jr., Art Director of The Cooper Union, this Jubilee Issue of The Cable is respectfully dedicated as an appreciation of his distinguished service to the Institution, and with gratitude for his kindly helpfulness in the preparation of this volume." He continued to paint for private customers. He did several illuminations of prayers and painted an alms box for a church in Philadelphia.

Purves's parents were friends of Maxfield Parrish and collected his work. Parrish became an artistic mentor to Purves at an early age. A correspondence started between the two artists when Purves was eleven years old and continued until Parrish was 90.

The family moved to East Litchfield, Connecticut, in 1936 as a result of Purves' friendship with Ernest Howe, a student at Yale School of Art, where Purves taught in the summer during the 1930s. Ernest Howe offered Purves a place to stay in Litchfield during the summer months. Later, Purves purchased a house on Wheeler Road in East Litchfield and built a studio in a converted barn behind his house. He hired young art students to help with large jobs. The house initially had no electricity or central heating.

== Work ==
Mosaic mural in the chapel of the memorial building at Rhone American Cemetery

In the 1930s, Purves was commissioned to do architectural paintings for the Folger Shakespeare Library in Washington, DC. From 1931 to 1932, he was one of thirteen American artists invited to contribute a mural painting to hang in the Capitol at the Smithsonian Museum for George Washington’s bicentennial celebration. His mural, "The Building of Fort Necessity," measured 22’ x 13’. For the 1939 World's Fair in Flushing, New York, he painted the exterior panels of the Temple of Religion, depicting various aspects of several religions. During World War II, he worked full-time for Civilian Defense, traveling around the state from his office at the Armory in Hartford, where he was the chairman and secretary of the State Blackout Committee. During that time, the Hartford Circus Fire occurred, from which he later drew paintings for his brother.

After the war, he resumed full-time work on various art projects. He created 265 aluminum wall sculptures representing the birds and flowers of all 48 states for the stairwells of the famed luxury passenger liner SS United States, which launched in 1952. Other work for this ship included a large aluminum eagle insignia for the first class grand staircase and an etched glass backdrop in the bar. In later years, he did aluminum bas-reliefs as well as mosaic panels adorned with ancient South American motifs for the Santa Rosa of Grace Lines. His decorative work on the ships SS America, SS United States, and Grace Line ships Santa Rosa and Santa Paula, spanned the years 1939–1959. The interior decorators for the ships also hired him as a consultant for the overall decorative design. He taught art at Bennington College part-time while working on interior decoration for the SS America.

From 1948 to 1955, Purves designed and executed mosaics for the chapel for the American Battle Monument Commission in Draguignan, France, where 861 Americans are buried. They died in the campaign in southern France, Operation Dragoon, launched on August 15, 1944, which assisted the Normandy operations. He made a mosaic column for Colgate University and designed a granite bas relief for a Boston bank (1950–1953). He painted the reredos for St. Paul's Church in Duluth, Minnesota, and another for a Lutheran church in Fort Wayne, Indiana. He painted a mural for Philip Staats' house in Litchfield, and all four walls of Margaret Howe Crapo's dining room in East Litchfield. In the early 1960s, he created a large mosaic work located in the East Apse of the Basilica of the National Shrine of the Immaculate Conception in Washington, D.C. His last commission (1959–1961) was for West Point Academy, where he designed granite spandrels for three buildings and stone sculptures for three additional buildings.

== Civic and volunteer contributions ==
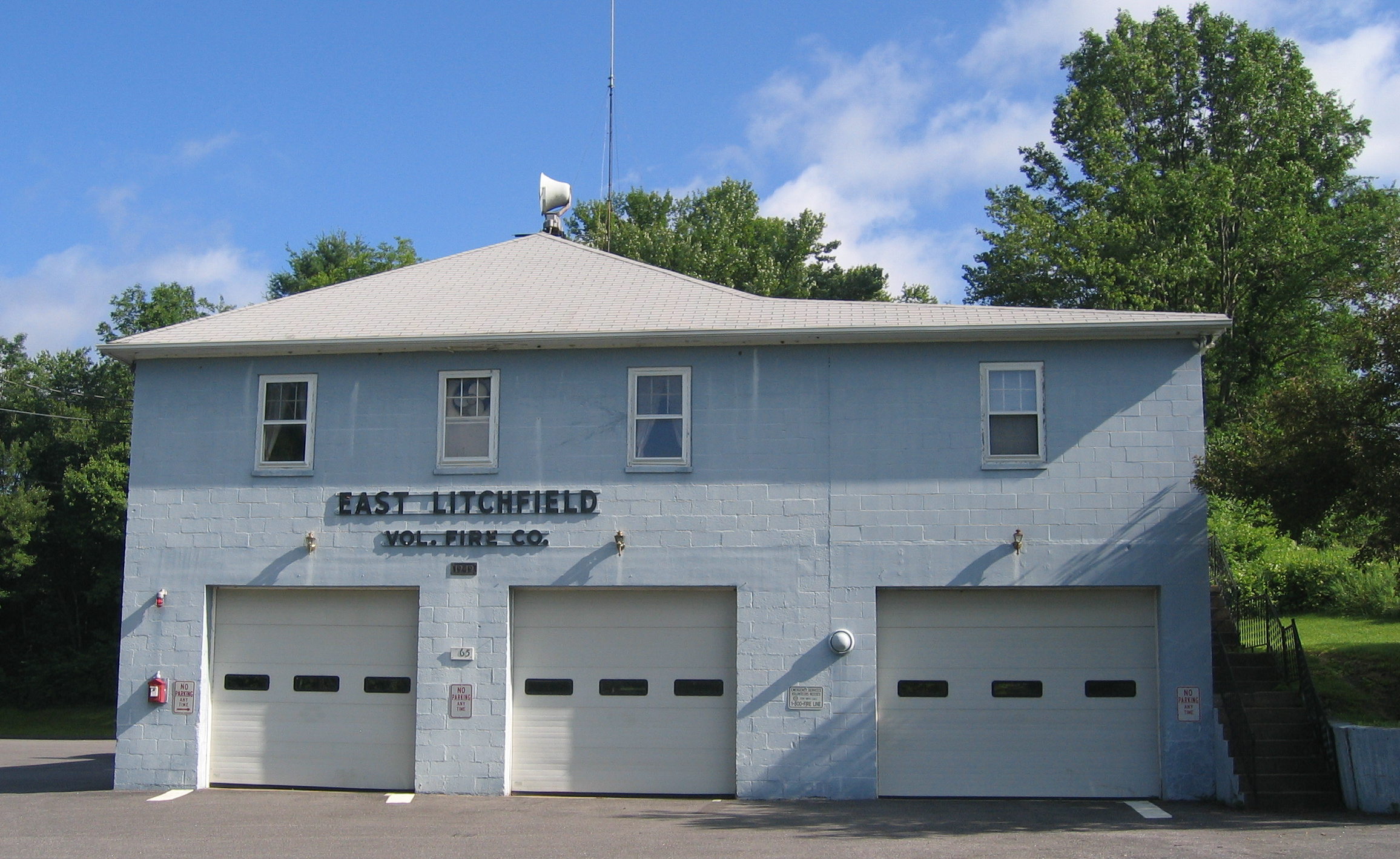
East Litchfield Volunteer Fire Company where Austin Purves served many years as Commissioner

Purves acted as Vice President of the Architectural League of New York and was President of the National Society of Mural Painters (1952–1953). He continued his association with the Cooper Union Art School by serving as a member of the Advisory Council, and he served for many years as a Trustee of the Hartford Art School, University of Hartford. During his 40 years in Litchfield, Connecticut, he was active with St. Michael's Church, serving as a vestryman and warden, teaching Sunday school, singing in the choir, and serving on the building committee for a new church house. He took great interest and pride in the East Litchfield Volunteer Fire Department, which he helped found and build. He served as the East Litchfield Fire Department’s commissioner for many years and designed its logo. He was a director of the Litchfield Chapter of the American Red Cross and a president of the Litchfield Parent-Teacher's Association.

== Memorial ==
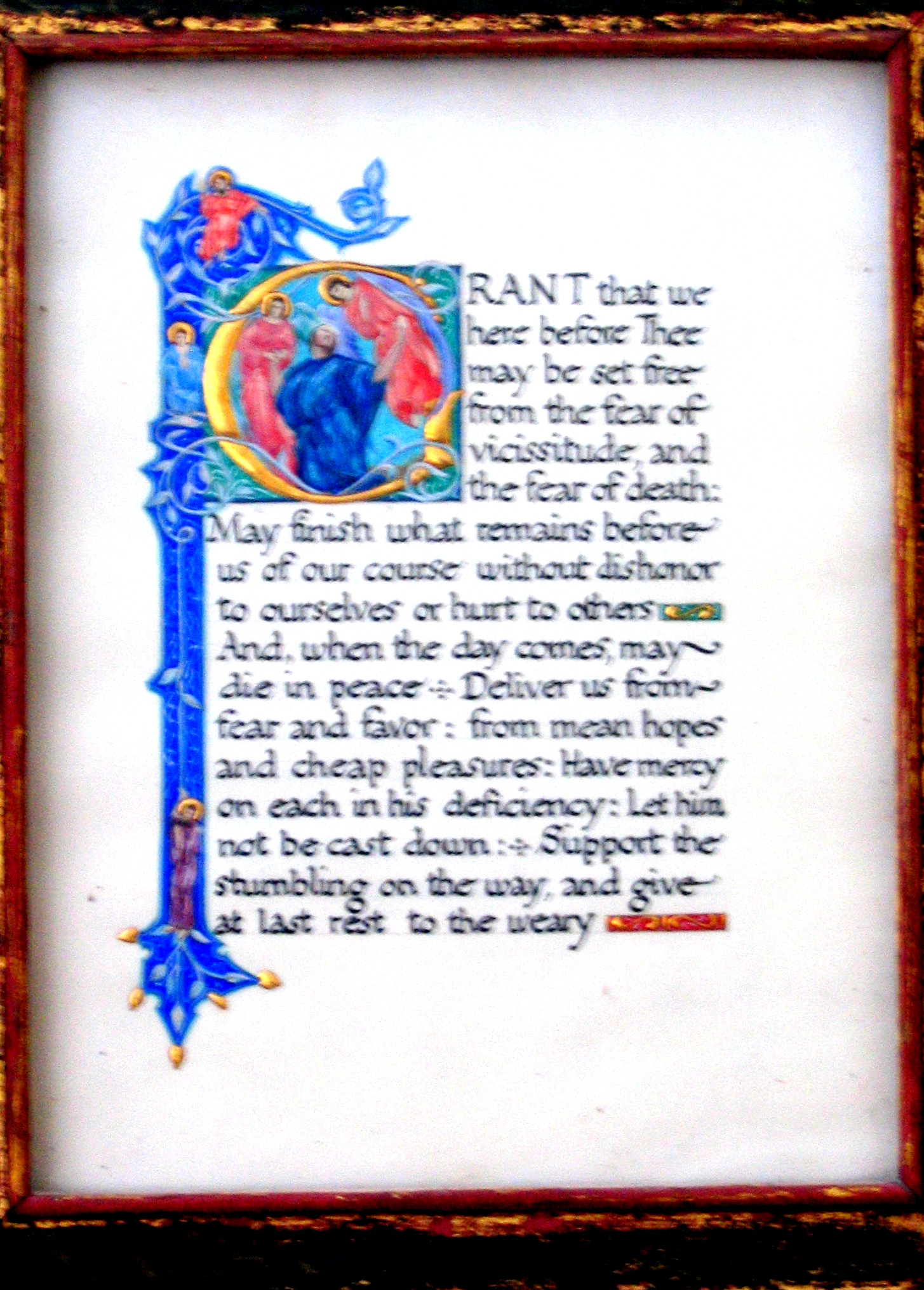
Illuminated prayer by Austin Purves

Purves was a member of the Century Club of New York. One of its members, Goodwin Cooke, wrote of him in the Century Club Association's magazine, Century Memorials:

Much of Austin's work was religious in nature; he was a scholar in the field of religious art and he was, unostentatiously, a profound Christian. He was in fact a well-rounded gentleman, versed in all branches and periods of painting, an eclectic and retentive reader, and had he not been a painter might well have become a musician. He was never stuffy, or bashful and indeed he cultivated a charming informality of manner. He was a delightful talker and he loved to listen as well—particularly to the young, with whom he had an engaging way and whom he never talked down to or patronized. His studio in East Litchfield was a center for a great number of aspiring painters and mosaicists.

Purves died on March 15, 1977, in Litchfield, Connecticut, where he and his wife, Ellen Wood Purves had made their home for 40 years and raised their children, Joan, Ellen, and Oliver.

== See also ==
- Operation Dragoon
- National Society of Mural Painters
