= East Litchfield Village, Connecticut =

Village in Connecticut, United States

Coordinates: 41°45′43″N 73°07′06″W

East Litchfield is an unincorporated village in the town of Litchfield, Litchfield County, Connecticut, United States.

The village of East Litchfield sits at the crossroads of the highways that connect Waterbury and Torrington; Hartford and Litchfield and the Naugatuck River that connects communities from Bridgeport to Winsted. East Litchfield, like Bantam, Milton and Northfield are parts of the town of Litchfield and have been since the town was settled in 1721.

Over 3,000 years ago Native Americans found East Litchfield to be a hunting ground rich with wild game. They used the outcroppings of soapstone to make various vessels for food and drink. The area was also rich with quartz that was used for arrowheads and centuries later sent to Massachusetts for sandpaper production.

When Europeans settled in the area, it became a community of farmers and mill workers. Naugatuck Valley Railroad built a depot in 1849 and extended the train to Winsted. The mills along the Naugatuck River were able to load their freight and passengers could disembark at East Litchfield and get a stage coach to Litchfield center, where they could take their summer retreats. Harwinton Fair attendees would take the train to and from East Litchfield where they would catch the shuttle to the Fair Grounds.

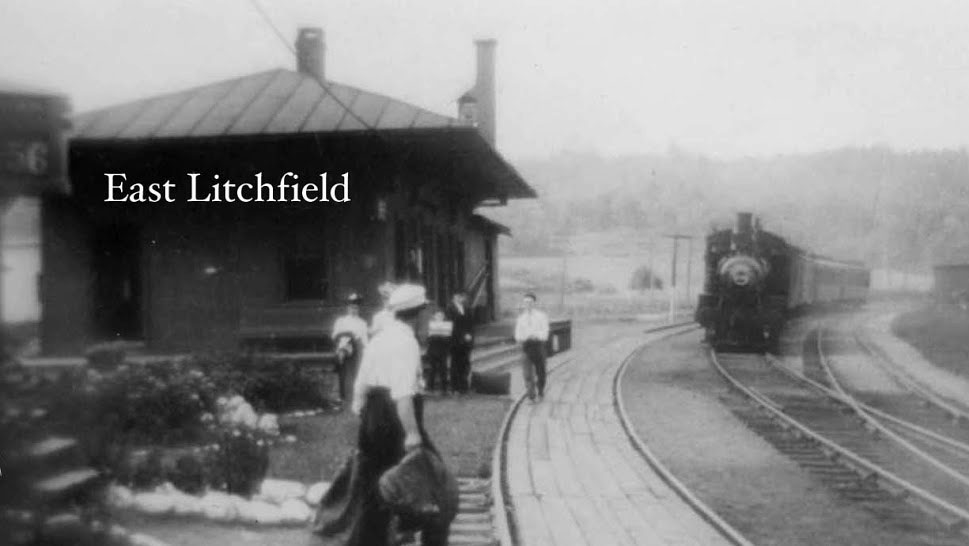
In 1849 the Naugatuck Valley Railroad extended their rails to Winsted, Connecticut. A depot was built in East Litchfield. Passengers could ride all the way to New York City without changing trains.

Along the banks of the Naugatuck River in East Litchfield were many mills; the Paige and Dains Paper Mill and Baldwin's Saw Mill were two of those. Ice was harvested from the Naugatuck River and stored in an icehouse built by the railroad company.

After the establishment of the depot, East Litchfield had a hotel and restaurant (Scovill House), a post office, blacksmith shop, harness shop, livery service to Litchfield center, Ferncliff Farm with a store and cheese factory, Mrs. Mark's variety store across from the depot, a chapel, one-room schoolhouse, icehouses, a baseball field, lumber mill, grist mill, cider mill, and a paper factory.

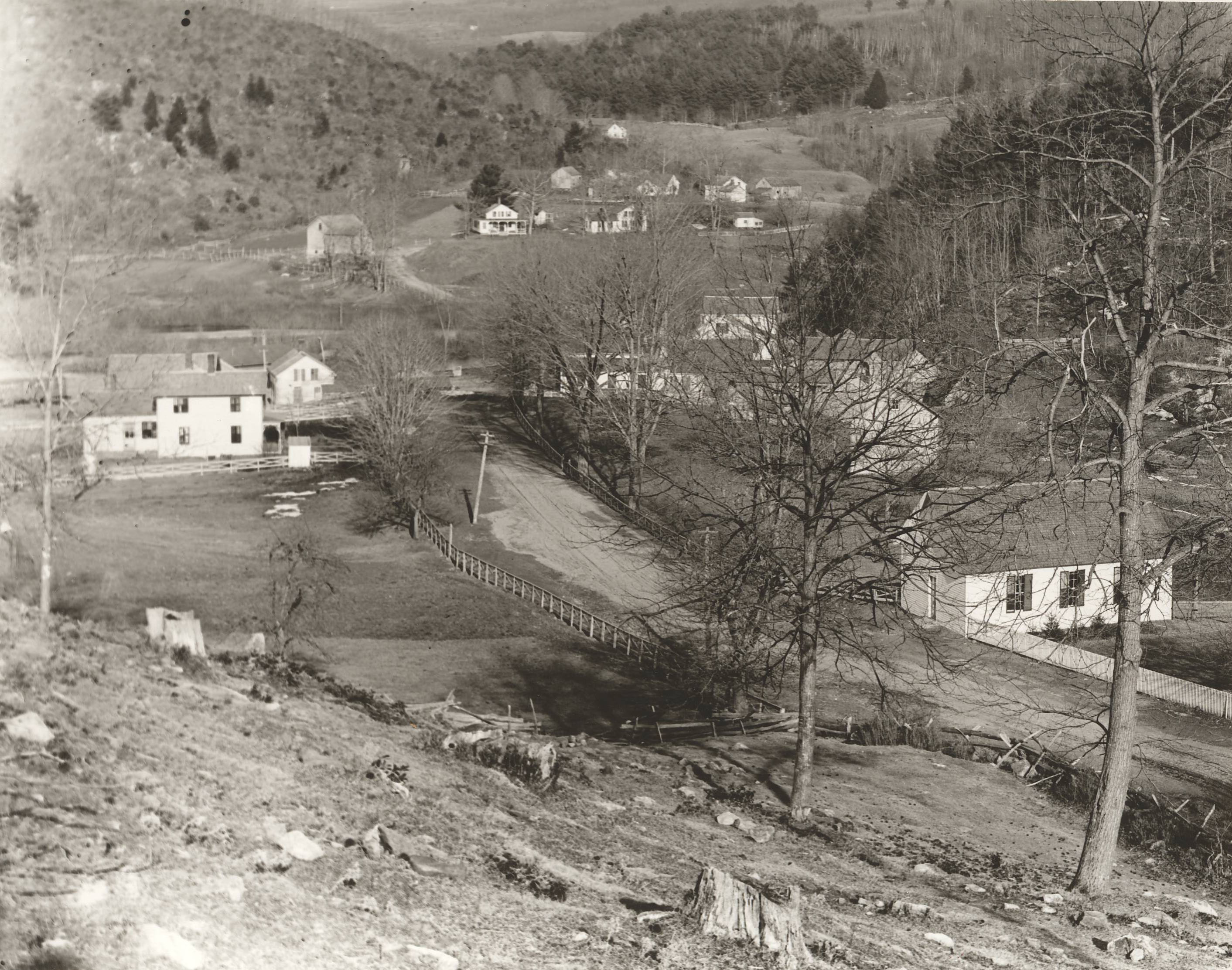
This photograph from the late 1800s shows the village of East Litchfield with Harwinton in the background.

All of the above-mentioned business establishments disappeared after the depot closed; the chapel is still there and just a few of the original village homes remain.

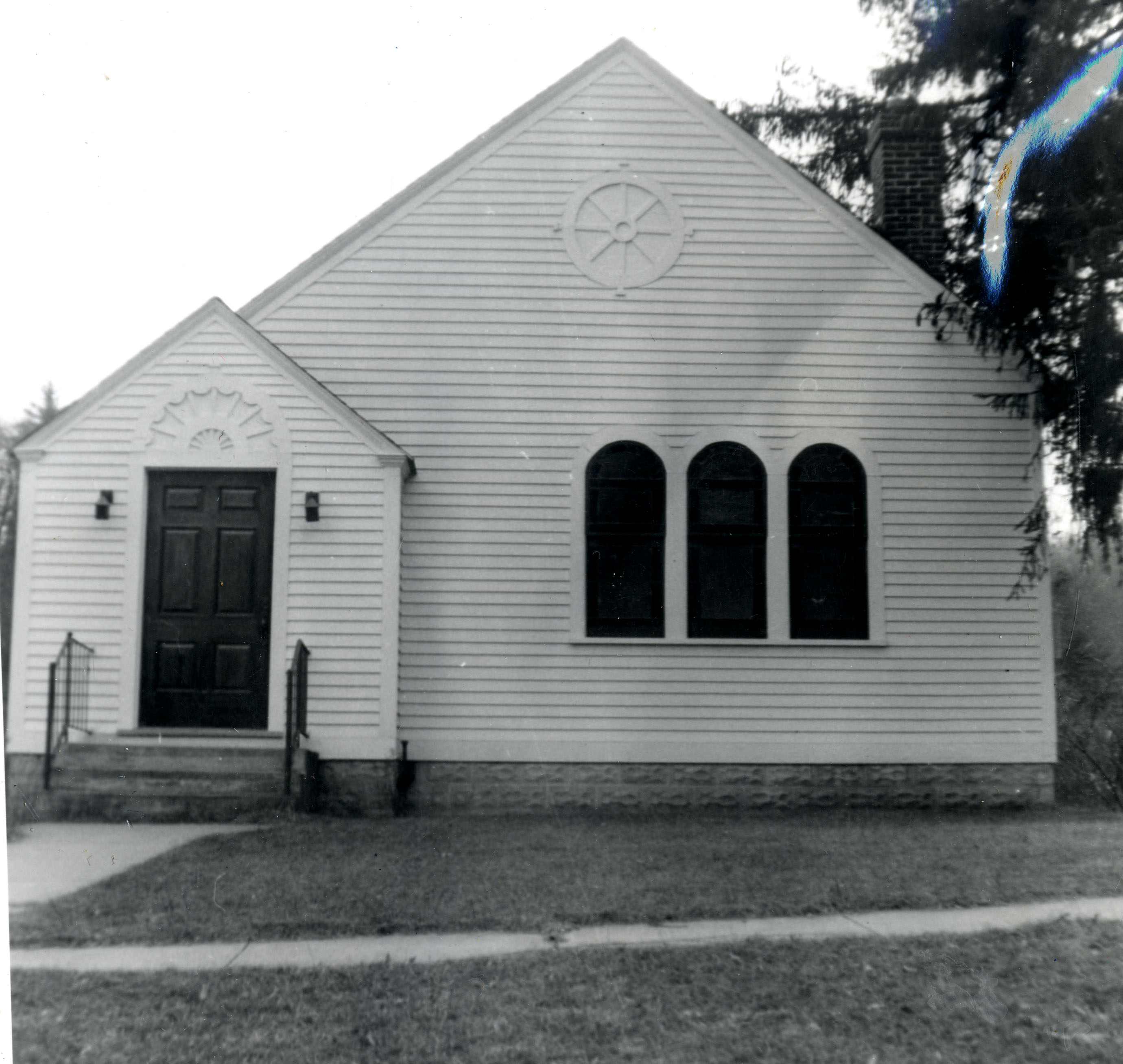
The East Litchfield Chapel was built by local residents in 1868. It still stands today.

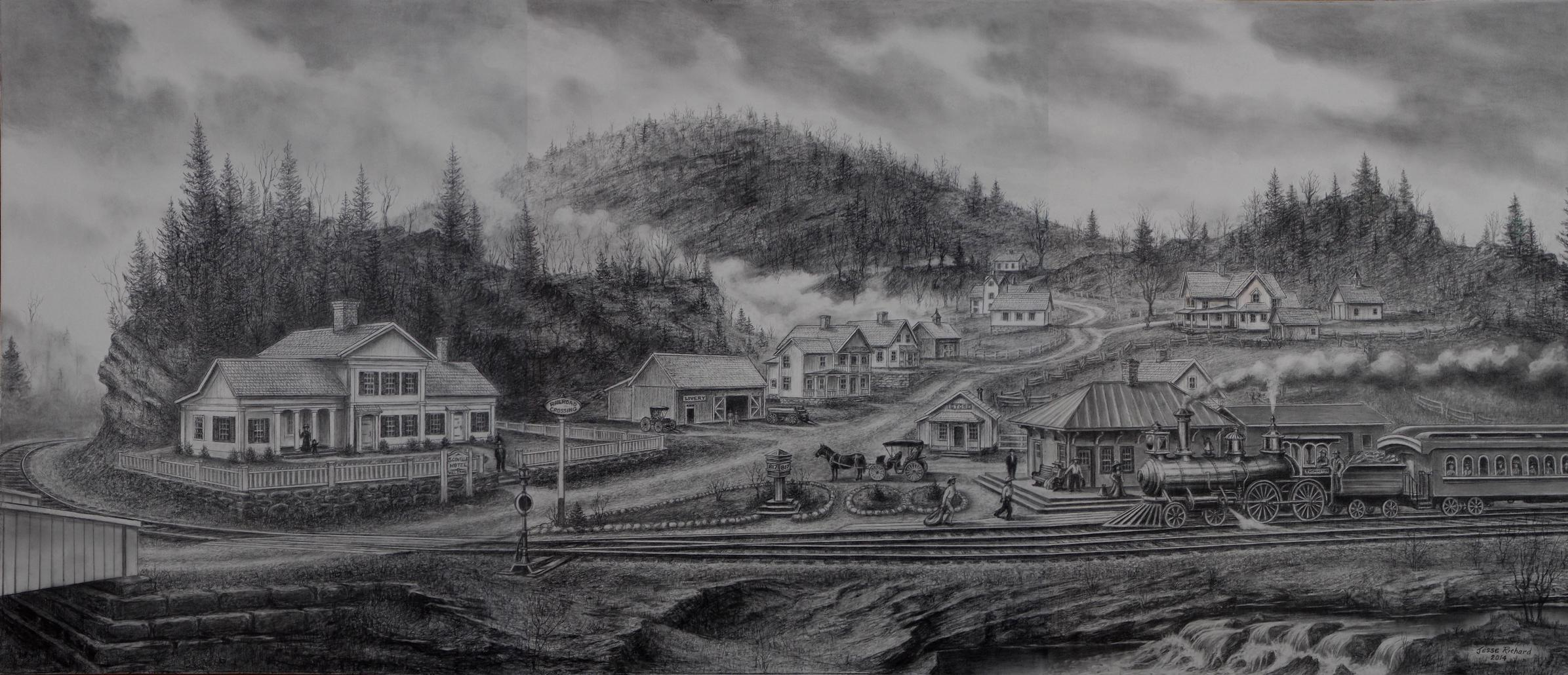
Illustration of the East Litchfield village circa 1880. There are no known photos in existence showing the depot from this perspective. This illustration was created by East Litchfield resident and artist Jesse Richard by referencing several old photos of the area.

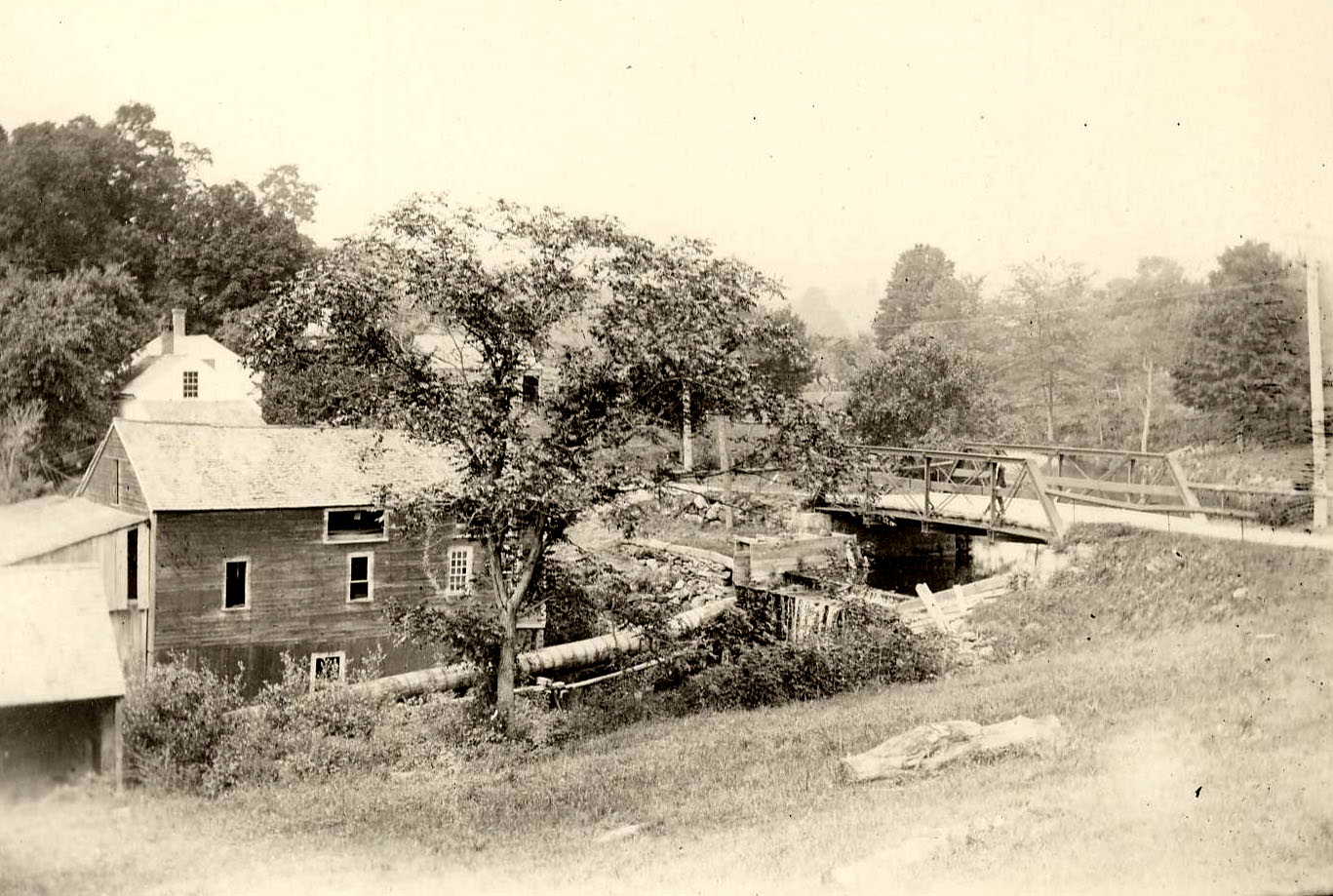
1900. There was a grist mill and a cider mill on Spruce Brook. In this image the bridge is on East Litchfield Road.

== Notable person ==
Town of Litchfield artist Austin Purves was a long time resident of East Litchfield.

== Transportation ==
The Naugatuck Railroad ran from Bridgeport to Winsted and in 1849 established a depot in East Litchfield.
