= Litchfield Public Schools =

School district in Connecticut, United States

Litchfield Public Schools is the school district of Litchfield, Connecticut.

== Schools ==
- Litchfield High School
- Litchfield Middle School
- Litchfield Intermediate School
- Center School
  - It opened as a grade 1-12 school in 1925. Before it was built, the Berkshire Hawkhurst Hotel occupied its site.
