= Lakeview High School (Connecticut) =

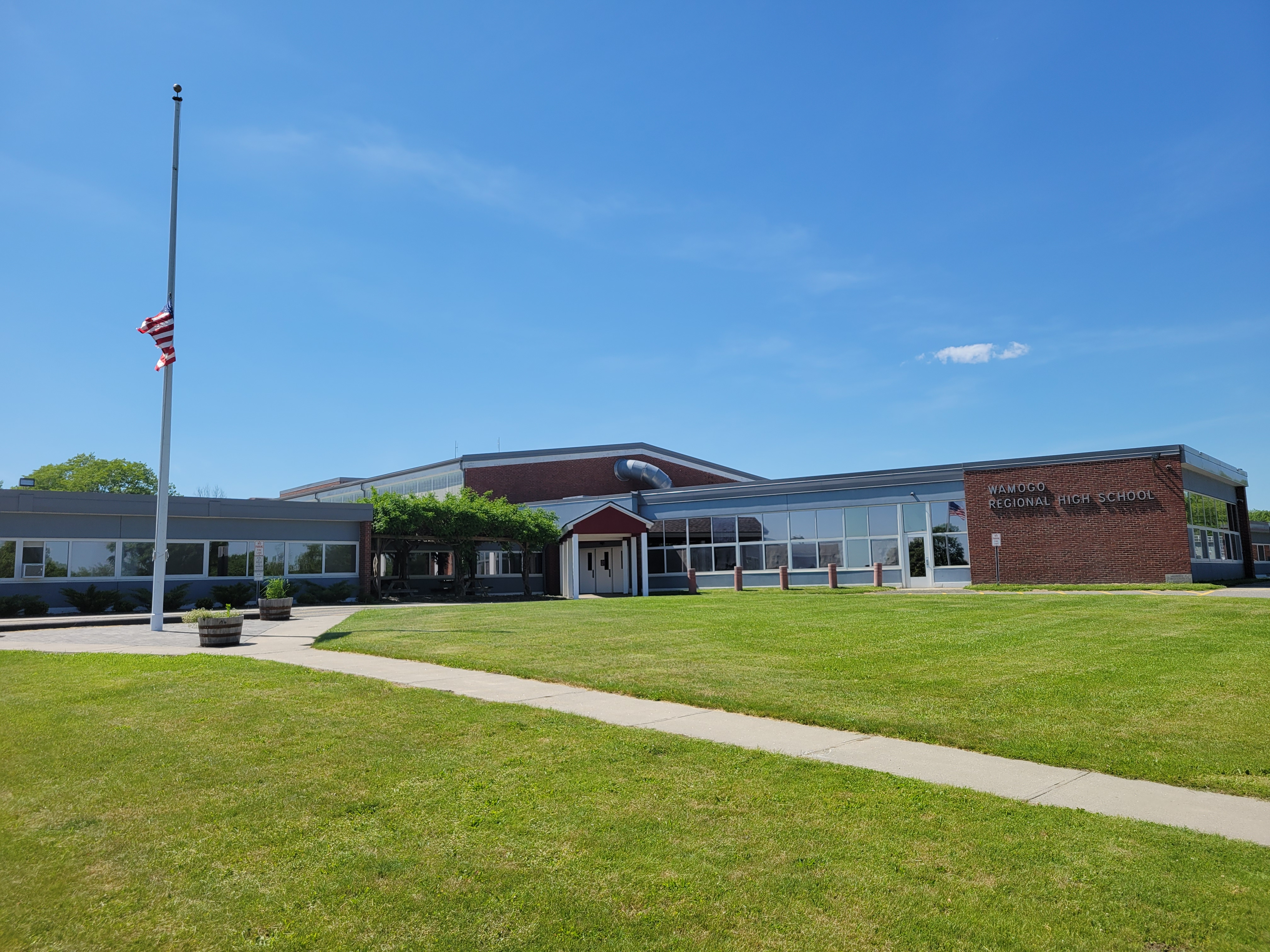
- Wamogo Regional High School

Location
- 98 Wamogo Road; Litchfield, Connecticut 06759; United States; 41°43′40″N 73°13′32″W

Information
- School type: Public, secondary school
- Founded: 1955 (71 years ago)
- Status: Open
- CEEB code: 070360
- Principal: Michael Valerio
- Grades: 7-12
- Enrollment: 379 (2021-22)
- Language: English
- Colors: Teal and White
- Athletics conference: Berkshire League
- Nickname: Bobcats
- Rival: Litchfield
- Website: www.rsd20.org/o/lakeviewhs

Lakeview High School, formerly Wamogo Regional High School is a public school in Litchfield, Connecticut. It serves grades 9 through 12. It is the public high school for the surrounding towns of Litchfield, Morris, Warren, and Goshen. Additionally, students from the towns of Torrington, Terryville, Plymouth, Harwinton, Burlington, and Thomaston can attend if they applied to the Agriculture Education Program for high school students only. Wamogo Regional Middle School was located in the same facility and served grades 7 through 12.

Wamogo was founded in 1955. Its name was a portmanteau stemming from the towns Warren, Morris, and Goshen, where the 'Wa' is for Warren, the 'mo' is for Morris, and the 'go' is for Goshen.

== History ==
=== Creation ===
For many years the people of Warren, Morris and Goshen had felt the need for a new high school. The school in Morris had become overcrowded. Warren and Goshen had no high schools of their own; their students attended various high schools in neighboring communities. Faced with an increasing student population, the citizens of these three communities were determined to provide more adequate educational facilities for their children.

On April 2, 1952, the temporary Regional Planning Committee had its first meeting. After ten months of intensive investigation and study, they made their recommendations. Those who served on this committee were Herbert Gubleman, Harry Moore, Roger Lyman and Arthur Wistrom from Goshen; George Angevine, William Hopkins, Harriet Tanner and Willis Tanner from Warren; David Benjamin, Brainerd Peck, Robert Skilton and Sherman Ives from Morris. Ernest O. Nybakken, Chief of the Bureau of Rural Services, State Department of Education, gave them valuable assistance.

One year later, on February 15, 1953, Goshen, Morris, and Warren voted to set up a regional high school district near the geographical center of the three towns. In June, the three towns elected their board members. Those elected were: Ruth W. Birmingham, George B. Angevine, Sherman K. Ives, Guido LaGrotta, David F. Benjamin, Frank J. Conlon, Roger T. Lyman, Carol Schilo, Robert H. Towne.

The members of the Board of Education, assisted by Dr. Charles Hapgood, supervisor of the district, gave their time and experience in facing the numerous problems that faced them. By December of that year, the site had been purchased, Nichols and Butterfield had been selected as architects, and the grading of the land begun. Shortly before Christmas, Goshen, Morris and Warren overwhelmingly approved a bond issue in the principal sum of $710,000.00. The building contract was given to the New England General Contracting Company. Mr. Russell Fitz was elected as principal of the school in February, 1954. On September 9, 1954, the cornerstone of the new Regional High School No. 6 was laid. The names of the three communities were combined to form the name of the new school–WAMOGO (Warren, Morris, Goshen).

On August 28, 1955, ten days before the school term was due to open, the building was completed and open to public inspection. Approximately 800 persons came to view, and to admire. On September 7, 1955, Wamogo Regional High School had its opening day.

The school was officially dedicated on December 18, 1955, at an impressive ceremony with Governor Abraham Ribicoff serving as the main speaker.

The school had its first senior graduating class in 1956. There were 20 students, consisting of both girls and boys.

=== Principals ===
The following individuals served as principals of Wamogo Regional High School from its creation until the merger:

No.	Image	Principal of Wamogo Regional High School	Term
1		Russell Andrew Fitz	February, 1954–1959
2		Nelson Sylvas Morin	1959–1966
3		James Milton Eisenhaure	1966–1971
4		Haywood Perry Cavarly Jr.	1971–1983
5		Vincent Luke Ferrandino	1983–1985
6		Leroy "Roy" Wagner Conklin	1985–February, 1991
7		Allen J. Fossbender	1991–1997
8		Janet Ann Garagliano	1997–July 29, 2005
9		Marvin "Muff" Maskovsky	July 29, 2005–July 1, 2006
10		Craig D. Drezek	July 1, 2006–March 1, 2008
11		Anthony T. Hibbert	March 1, 2008–July 1, 2008
12		Keith F. Rafaniello	July 1, 2008–August 7, 2008
13		Andrew Mozelak	August 7, 2008–July 1, 2009
14		William Egan	July 1, 2009–July 1, 2015
15		Jody Lambert	July 1, 2015–June 3, 2016
16		Pamela Lazaroski	June 3, 2016–September 19, 2016
17		Jaime Rivera	September 19, 2016–April 6, 2017
18		Pamela Lazaroski	April 6, 2017–July 17, 2017
19		Sabin Loveland	July 17, 2017–July 1, 2024

The following individuals served as principals of Lakeview High School following the merger:

No.	Principal of Lakeview High School	Term
1	Michael Valerio	July 1, 2024–present

== Merger ==
On June 29, 2022, Warren, Morris, Goshen and Litchfield High School voted to merge their school systems, creating a new Region 20. The Wamogo building now serves as the high school for the new region, following the merge in 2024. The sports programs were also merged, with Wamogo losing the "Warriors" branding. The new school mascot became a bobcat.

Although 'Wamogo' remains the name of the school's agricultural program, the high school now goes under the name of Lakeview High School.

== Athletics ==
Wins in CIAC State Championships (as Wamogo)
Sport	Class	Year(s)
Basketball (girls)	S	1995
Cross country (girls)	S	1978

== Notable alumni ==
Notable people who have attended Wamogo include former NBA star Chuck Aleksinas and flat track motorcycle racer Kenny Coolbeth.
