= Litchfield, Connecticut =

- Town
- Commercial blocks on West Street

- Seal
- Motto(s): Unitas Sub Lege (Latin) "Unity Under the Law"
- Interactive map of Litchfield, Connecticut
- Location within Connecticut Location within the United States
- Coordinates: 41°44′50″N 73°11′23″W
- Country: United States
- U.S. state: Connecticut
- County: Litchfield
- Region: Northwest Hills
- Incorporated: 1719

Government
  - Type: Selectman-town meeting
  - First Selectman: Denise Raap (D)
  - Selectmen: JodiAnn Tenney (D); Christine Harding (R); Jonathan E. Torrant (R); Jeffrey J. Zullo (D)

Area
  - Total: 56.8 sq mi (147.1 km^{2})
  - Land: 56.1 sq mi (145.3 km^{2})
  - Water: 0.69 sq mi (1.8 km^{2})
- Elevation: 1,079 ft (329 m)

Population (2020)
  - Total: 8,192
  - Density: 146/sq mi (56.4/km^{2})
- Time zone: UTC−05:00 (EST)
  - Summer (DST): UTC−04:00 (EDT)
- ZIP Code: 06750 [Bantam], 06759 [Litchfield], 06778 [Northfield]
- Area codes: 860/959
- FIPS code: 09-43370
- GNIS feature ID: 0213452
- Website: www.townoflitchfieldct.gov

Litchfield is a town in and former county seat of Litchfield County, Connecticut, United States. The population was 8,192 at the 2020 census. The town is part of the Northwest Hills Planning Region. The boroughs of Bantam and Litchfield are located within the town. There are also three unincorporated villages: East Litchfield, Milton, and Northfield. Northfield, located in the southeastern corner of Litchfield, is home to a high percentage of the Litchfield population.

== History ==
Originally called Bantam township, Litchfield incorporated in 1719. The town derives its name from Lichfield, in England.

In 1751 it became the county seat of Litchfield County, and at the same time the borough of Litchfield (incorporated in 1879) was laid out. From 1776 to 1780, two depots for military stores and a workshop for the Continental army were maintained in Litchfield. A leaden statue of George III, erected on the Bowling Green in New York City in 1770, was torn down by citizens on July 9, 1776, cut up and then taken to Litchfield, where, in the house of Oliver Wolcott, it was melted into bullets for the Continental Army by Wolcott's daughter and sister.

During the American Revolution, several prominent Loyalists were held prisoner in the town, including William Franklin, son of Benjamin Franklin, and David Mathews, Mayor of New York City.

In 1784, the first law school in the United States, the so-named Litchfield Law School, was established by judge and legal scholar Tapping Reeve. Prior to its establishment, Reeve had accepted several legal apprentices since he had settled there in 1773, but saw such demand for his expertise that he formally opened the one-room school within a decade. During the school's fifty-year history it would accept more than 1,100 students, including Aaron Burr, Jr., Horace Mann, and Levi Woodbury, the first justice of the US Supreme Court to attend law school.

Litchfield was also home to a pioneering institution of young women's education, the Litchfield Female Academy, founded in 1792 by Sarah Pierce.

The Litchfield Historical Society, located in the center of town, contains a wide variety of items with historical importance to the town.

== Geography ==
Located southwest of Torrington, Litchfield also includes part of Bantam Lake. According to the United States Census Bureau, the town has a total area of 56.8 square miles (147.1 km^{2}), of which 56.1 square miles (145.2 km^{2}) is land and 0.7 square mile (1.9 km^{2}) (1.3%) is water.

Litchfield is about 95 mi (153 km) from Central Park in New York, approximately 50 mi (80 km) from the Hudson River Valley, and about 40 mi (64 km) from the nearest sea coast, on Long Island Sound.

=== Principal communities ===
- Bantam (borough)
- East Litchfield (unincorporated village)
- Litchfield (borough / town center)
- Milton (unincorporated village)
- Northfield (unincorporated village)

== Demographics ==
Historical population
Census	Pop.	Note	%±
1790	20,342		—
1800	4,285		−78.9%
1810	4,639		8.3%
1820	4,610		−0.6%
1830	4,456		−3.3%
1840	4,038		−9.4%
1850	3,953		−2.1%
1860	3,200		−19.0%
1870	3,113		−2.7%
1880	3,410		9.5%
1890	3,304		−3.1%
1900	3,214		−2.7%
1910	3,005		−6.5%
1920	3,180		5.8%
1930	3,574		12.4%
1940	4,029		12.7%
1950	4,964		23.2%
1960	6,264		26.2%
1970	7,399		18.1%
1980	7,605		2.8%
1990	8,365		10.0%
2000	8,316		−0.6%
2010	8,466		1.8%
2020	8,192		−3.2%
U.S. Decennial Census

As of the census of 2000, there were 8,316 people, 3,310 households, and 2,303 families residing in the town. The population density was 148.4 inhabitants per square mile (57.3/km^{2}). There were 3,629 housing units at an average density of 64.7 per square mile (25.0/km^{2}). The racial makeup of the town was 96.99% White, 0.75% Black or African American, 0.23% Native American, 0.47% Asian, 0.01% Pacific Islander, 0.46% from other races, and 1.09% from two or more races. Hispanic or Latino of any race were 1.56% of the population.

There were 3,310 households, out of which 31.2% had children under the age of 18 living with them, 59.9% were married couples living together, 7.2% had a female householder with no husband present, and 30.4% were non-families. 26.5% of all households were made up of individuals, and 13.2% had someone living alone who was 65 years of age or older. The average household size was 2.45 and the average family size was 2.98.

In the town, the population was spread out, with 25.2% under the age of 18, 3.6% from 18 to 24, 25.6% from 25 to 44, 28.6% from 45 to 64, and 17.0% who were 65 years of age or older. The median age was 43 years. For every 100 females, there were 92.5 males. For every 100 females age 18 and over, there were 90.3 males.

The median income for a household in the town was $58,418, and the median income for a family was $70,594. Males had a median income of $50,284 versus $31,787 for females. The per capita income for the town was $30,096. About 2.8% of families and 4.0% of the population were below the poverty line, including 2.6% of those under age 18 and 5.2% of those age 65 or over.

Voter registration and party enrollment as of October 31, 2023
Party	Active voters	Inactive voters	Total voters	Percentage
Democratic	1,865	143	2,008	30.61%
Republican	1,893	109	2,002	30.51%
Unaffiliated	2,226	193	2,419	36.88%
Minor Parties	119	12	131	2.00%
Total	6,103	457	6,560	100%

== Government and infrastructure ==
Litchfield has a Town Meeting form of government, with a three member Board of Selectment. The current first selectman is Denise Raap, a Democrat first elected in 2021.

Litchfield does not have a police force, but is covered by a Resident Trooper from the Connecticut State Police. The town has four volunteer fire stations.

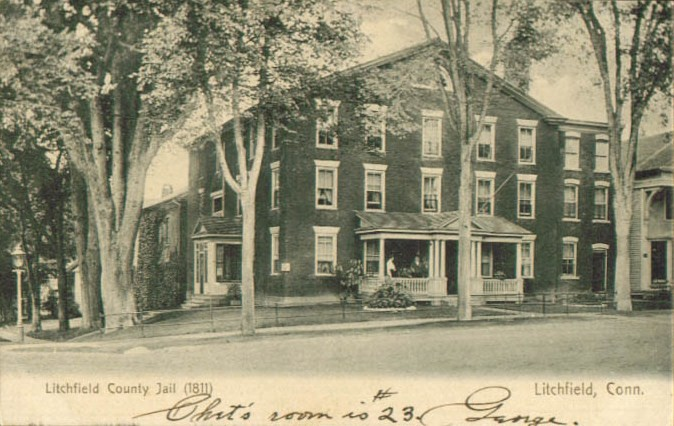
Litchfield County Jail, 1907

The 1812 Litchfield County Jail, the town's oldest public building, is in Litchfield. While controlled by the Connecticut state government, the facility historically held inmates convicted of minor offenses. Governor of Connecticut Lowell P. Weicker Jr. ordered the facility closed for financial reasons in 1993. It was converted into the McAuliffe Manor, a substance abuse treatment center for women operated by Naugatuck Valley HELP Inc., but in 2009 the contract between Naugatuck Valley HELP Inc. and the state expired, leading to the closure of McAuliffe Manor. The building was revamped and now hosts small shops alongside a popular restaurant that maintains inside the original cell bars as a nod to the building’s former life.

== Transportation ==
U.S. Route 202 is the main east-west road connecting Bantam and Litchfield center to the city of Torrington and New Milford, Connecticut. Route 63 runs north-south through the town center. The Route 8 expressway runs along the town line with Harwinton. It can be accessed from the town center via Route 118. The town is also served by buses from the Northwestern Connecticut Transit District connecting to the city of Torrington. The Shepaug Valley Railroad opened a Litchfield terminal in 1872, but passenger service ended in 1930 and freight service in 1948.

== Education ==
Litchfield Public Schools operates public schools. Lakeview High School is the area high school. Students may also attend Oliver Wolcott Technical School, located in Torrington.

Litchfield Center School hosts children in grades K–3, with a Pre-K program available. Students then move on to Litchfield Intermediate School, where they will remain through sixth grade. Students then finish their Litchfield Public School career at Lakeview High School.

Litchfield is also home to Forman School, a private boarding school for students in grades 9–12/PG with learning differences such as ADD/ADHD and dyslexia.

== Notable people ==
- Andrew Adams, political leader during and after the Revolutionary War
- Josephine Cables Aldrich (1843–1917), spiritualist, Theosophist, editor, and publisher
- Ethan Allen, one of the founders of Vermont
- Catharine Beecher, educator
- Henry Ward Beecher, Congregationalist clergyman
- Lyman Beecher, Presbyterian minister
- BenDeLaCreme, drag queen
- Mary Charlotte Ward Granniss Webster Billings, writer, evangelist, and missionary
- Charles F. Brooker, state politician and business executive
- Solyman Brown, creator of the first dental school
- Adelaide Deming, painter
- Nell Dorr, photographer
- Dick Ebersol, television executive
- Caroline Fitzgerald (1865–1911), poet
- Eugene Fodor, travel writer
- Jerome Fuller, chief justice of Minnesota Territorial Supreme Court, 1851–1852
- Elizabeth Gilbert, author of Eat, Pray, Love
- Jane Grant, writer
- F. Norton Goddard, Republican politician
- Benjamin Hanks (1755–1824), goldsmith and instrument maker
- Uriel Holmes, US congressman
- Isabella Beecher Hooker, women's suffrage activist
- Susan Saint James, actress
- Daniel Albion "Jumping Jack" Jones (1860–1936), professional baseball pitcher
- Madeleine L'Engle, author
- Thomas McKnight, painter
- Charles B. McVay III, US naval officer
- Phineas Miner, US congressman
- Joseph Robert Morris, entrepreneur, investor, mayor of Houston, Texas; born and raised in Milton
- Samuel S. Phelps, US senator from Vermont
- John Pierce Jr., Paymaster-General of the United States Army
- Sarah Pierce, teacher, educator and founder of the Litchfield Female Academy
- John Pierpoint, Chief Justice of the Vermont Supreme Court
- Robert Pierpoint, Lieutenant Governor of Vermont
- Austin M. Purves Jr., 20th century artist and educator
- Tapping Reeve, lawyer, judge, and law educator
- Mary Livingston Ripley, horticulturist, entomologist, and photographer
- Richard Skinner, governor of Vermont
- Roger Skinner, judge of the United States District Court for the Northern District of New York
- Charles Smith, Arizona lawman and friend of Wyatt Earp
- Elihu Hubbard Smith, physician and man of letters, one of the Hartford Wits
- Harriet Beecher Stowe, abolitionist and author
- Benjamin Tallmadge, American military officer during the Revolutionary War
- Frederick A. Tallmadge, lawyer and New York politician
- Frank Livingston Underwood (1844–1918), banker, copper magnate, railroad founder
- Emily Noyes Vanderpoel (1842–1939), painter, writer, philanthropist
- Louis Fenn Wadsworth (1825–1908), early baseball pioneer
- Paul Winter, saxophonist
- Oliver Wolcott Sr., signer of the U.S. Declaration of Independence
- Oliver Wolcott Jr., US Secretary of the Treasury, 24th governor of Connecticut

== On the National Register of Historic Places ==
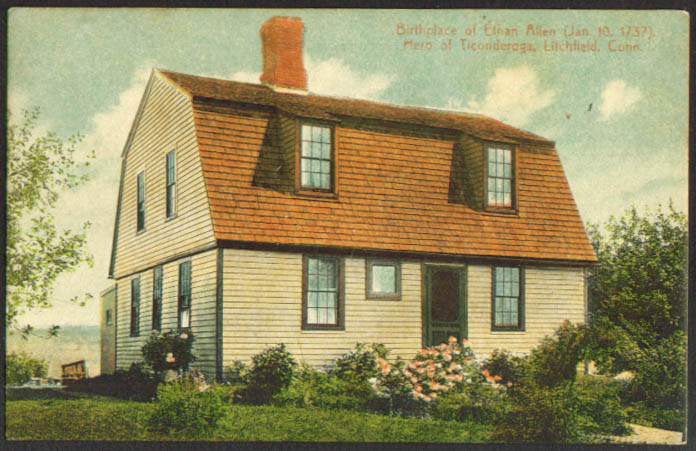
Ethan Allen birthplace in Litchfield

- Capt. William Bull Tavern – CT 202 (added July 30, 1983)
- Henry B. Bissell House – 202 Maple Street (added October 7, 1990)
- J. Howard Catlin House – 14 Knife Shop Road (added September 6, 1993) (Since demolished)
- Litchfield Historic District – Roughly both sides of North and South Streets between Gallows Lane and Prospect Street (added December 24, 1968)
- Milton Center Historic District (added March 14, 1978)
- Humaston Brook State Park (added May 8, 1997)
- Oliver Wolcott House – South Street (added December 11, 1971)
- Rye House – 122–132 Old Mount Tom Road (added September 10, 2000)
- Tapping Reeve House and Law School – South Street (added November 15, 1966)
- Topsmead – 25 and 46 Chase Road (added December 19, 1993)

== See also ==
- List of newspapers in Connecticut#Litchfield
- Litchfield Law School
- White Memorial Foundation
- White Memorial Conservation Center
