= Lawrence House =

Lawrence House may refer to:

in Canada

- Lawrence House Museum, Maitland, Nova Scotia

in the United Kingdom

- Lawrence House, Cornwall, England
- Lawrence House, Tremadog, Caernarfonshire, Wales, birthplace and home of T. E. Lawrence

in the United States (by state then city)

- Abner Elliot England-Guy Hidden Lawrence House, Phoenix, Arizona, listed on the National Register of Historic Places (NRHP) in Maricopa County
- Isaac Lawrence House, Canaan, Connecticut, listed on the NRHP in Litchfield County
- Lawrence (Seaford, Delaware), listed on the NRHP in Sussex County
- Lawrence House (Baltimore, Maryland)
- Lawrence Model Lodging Houses, Boston, Massachusetts, listed on the NRHP in Suffolk County
- Albree-Hall-Lawrence House, Medford, Massachusetts, listed on the NRHP in Middlesex County
- William Lawrence House (Taunton, Massachusetts), listed on the NRHP in Bristol County
- Phineas Lawrence House, Waltham, Massachusetts, listed on the NRHP in Middlesex County
- Lawrence Opera House, Lawrence, Nebraska, listed on the NRHP in Nuckolls County
- Lawrence Farm, Troy, New Hampshire, listed on the NRHP in Cheshire County
- Pearson-How, Cooper, and Lawrence Houses, Burlington, New Jersey, listed on the NRHP in Burlington County
- Lawrence Mansion, Hamburg, New Jersey, listed on the NRHP in Burlington County
- Hunter-Lawrence-Jessup House, Woodbury, New Jersey, listed on the NRHP in Gloucester County
- Calvin Wray Lawrence House, Apex, North Carolina, listed on the NRHP in Wake County
- John P. Lawrence Plantation, Grissom, North Carolina, listed on the NRHP in Wake County
- D. H. Lawrence Ranch, San Cristobal, New Mexico, listed as D. H. Lawrence Ranch Historic District on the NRHP in Taos County
- Dr. Elmo N. Lawrence House, Raleigh, North Carolina, listed on the NRHP in Wake County
- Duke-Lawrence House, Rich Square, North Carolina, listed on the NRHP in Northampton County
- William Lawrence House (Bellefontaine, Ohio), listed on the NRHP in Logan County
- G. E. Lawrence House, Lufkin, Texas, listed on the NRHP in Angelina County
- Stephen Decatur Lawrence Farmstead, Mesquite, Texas, listed on the NRHP in Dallas County
- Lawrence House (Victoria, Texas), listed on the NRHP in Victoria County
- Amos Lawrence House, Manchester, Vermont, listed on the NRHP in Bennington County
- Frank Lawrence House, Basham, Virginia, listed on the NRHP listings in Montgomery County

== See also ==
- William Lawrence House (disambiguation)
