= Isaac Lawrence House =

Historic house in Connecticut, United States

- U.S. National Register of Historic Places
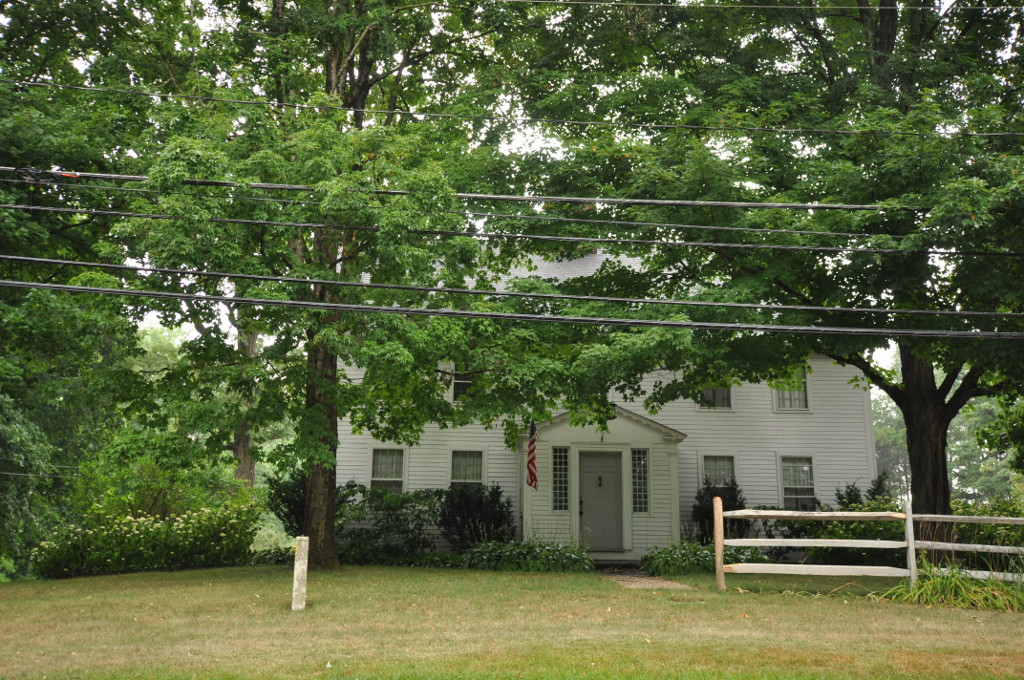

- Location within Connecticut Location within the United States
- Location: Elm Street, North Canaan, Connecticut
- Coordinates: 42°1′23″N 73°19′33″W
- Area: 6.5 acres (2.6 ha)
- Built: 1751
- Architectural style: Mixed (more Than 2 Styles From Different Periods)
- NRHP reference No.: 83001270
- Added to NRHP: March 10, 1983

The Isaac Lawrence House is a historic house on Elm Street in the Canaan Village of North Canaan, Connecticut. Built about 1751 by one of the town's first settlers, the house has served as a residence and tavern, serving customers on the adjacent travel route. The property is also of archaeological significance, with historical artifacts dating to the 18th century. It was listed on the National Register of Historic Places in 1983.

== Description and history ==
The Isaac Lawrence House is located just south of the village center of Canaan (not to be confused with the town of Canaan further south), on the west side of Elm Street (United States Route 7) just north of its crossing of the Blackberry River. It is a 2 1/2-story wood-frame structure, with a side-gable roof, central chimney, and clapboarded exterior. The front facade faces east to the street, and is symmetrical, with a central entrance sheltered by a gable-roofed enclosed vestibule. The interior follows a center chimney plan, with the entry area including a winding paneled staircase, and parlors to either side of the chimney. The original kitchen extends behind the chimney, with a large fireplace and beehive oven. These rooms and others retain original woodwork.

North Canaan, originally part of the town of Canaan, was settled in the 1730s. Isaac Lawrence was among the first wave of settlers, and built this house in 1751. In addition to farming, Lawrence operated a tavern out of the house, where many local meetings were held. The opening of the Hartford-Albany Turnpike (United States Route 44, just to the north) in 1800 brought the tavern increased business. As of the property's 1983 listing on the National Register, it was still in the hands of Lawrence's descendants. Archaeological excavations conducted on the property in 1979 and 1980 established the presence of well-stratified historic artifacts from the period of initial settlement.

== See also ==
- National Register of Historic Places listings in Litchfield County, Connecticut
