= Whiting River (Connecticut) =

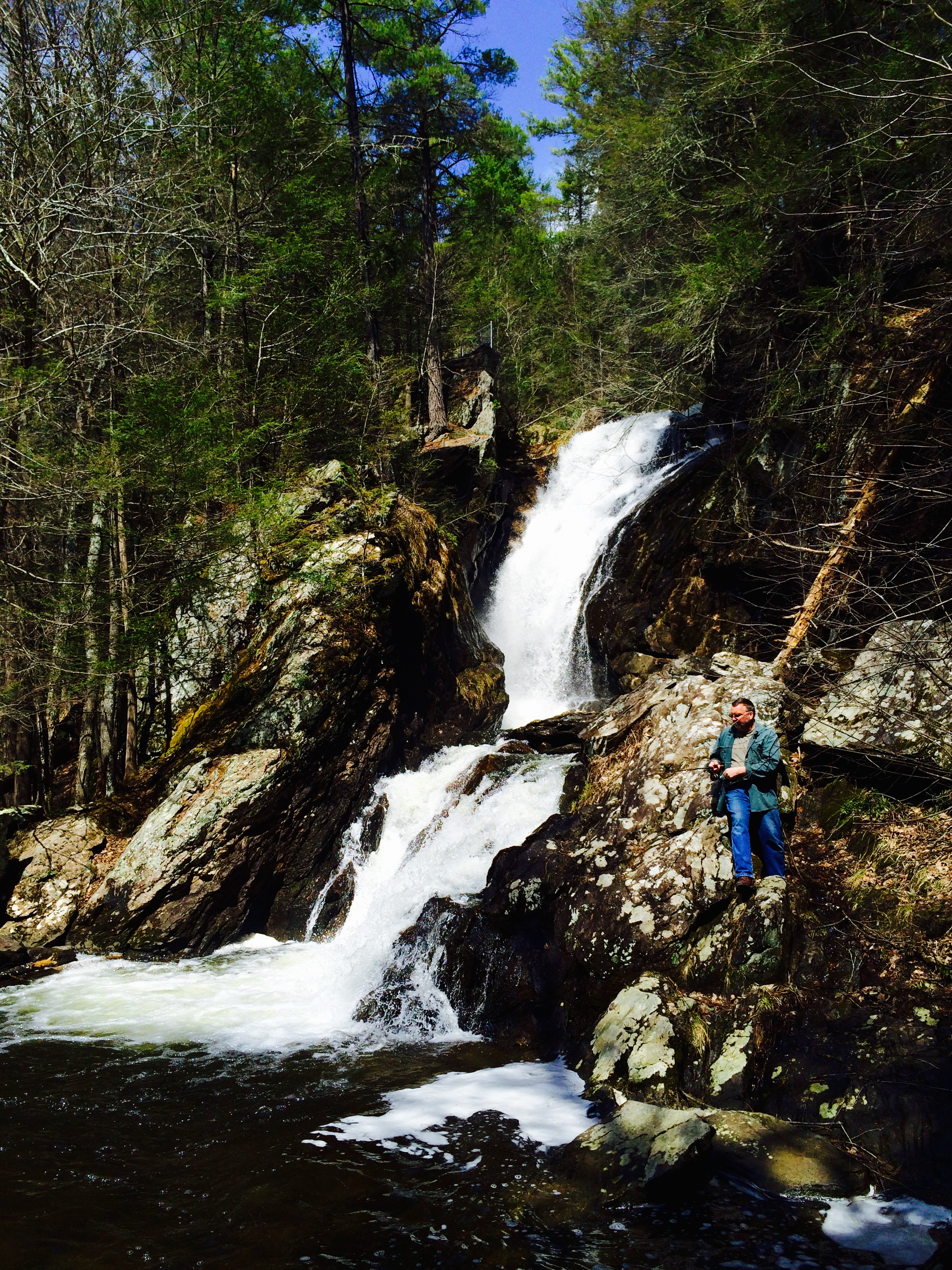
- Campbell Falls on the Whiting River The Whiting River's source (in Massachusetts) and mouth (in Connecticut)

Location
- Country: United States
- States: Massachusetts, Connecticut
- Towns: New Marlborough, Massachusetts, North Canaan, Connecticut

Physical characteristics
- Source: Thousand Acre Swamp
  - location: New Marlborough, Massachusetts
  - coordinates: (42°04′00″N 73°12′40″W)
  - elevation: 1,388 ft (423 m)
- Mouth: Blackberry River
  - location: North Canaan, Connecticut
  - coordinates: (42°00′40″N 73°16′26″W)
  - elevation: 748 ft (228 m)
- Length: 7 mi (11 km)
- Basin size: 12,464.23 acres (5,044.09 ha)
- Width
  - maximum: 50 feet (15 m)
- Depth
  - maximum: 5 feet (1.5 m)

Basin features
- River system: Housatonic
- Tributaries
  - right: Ginger Creek

The Whiting River is a southward-flowing stream located in Massachusetts and the far northwest corner of Connecticut in the United States. The river runs for seven miles from its source at the Thousand Acre Swamp in New Marlborough before emptying into the Blackberry River in North Canaan. The river follows a curving southwesterly course for four miles in Massachusetts, passing over 100-foot-high Campbell Falls at Campbell Falls State Park Reserve, where it is joined by the northwest-flowing Ginger Creek. It flows south for 2.78 miles from the state line north of Canaan Valley to its mouth on the Blackberry River in Connecticut.

== Watershed ==
The Whiting River drains marshy areas of the southern part of New Marlborough. The river's watershed includes Wolf Swamp, Thousand Acre Swamp, East Indies Pond, and Hay Meadow Pond. Two man-made lakes, Cookson Pond and Windemere Lake, also discharge into the Whiting River in Massachusetts.
