= South Canaan Congregational Church =

Historic church in Connecticut, United States

- U.S. National Register of Historic Places
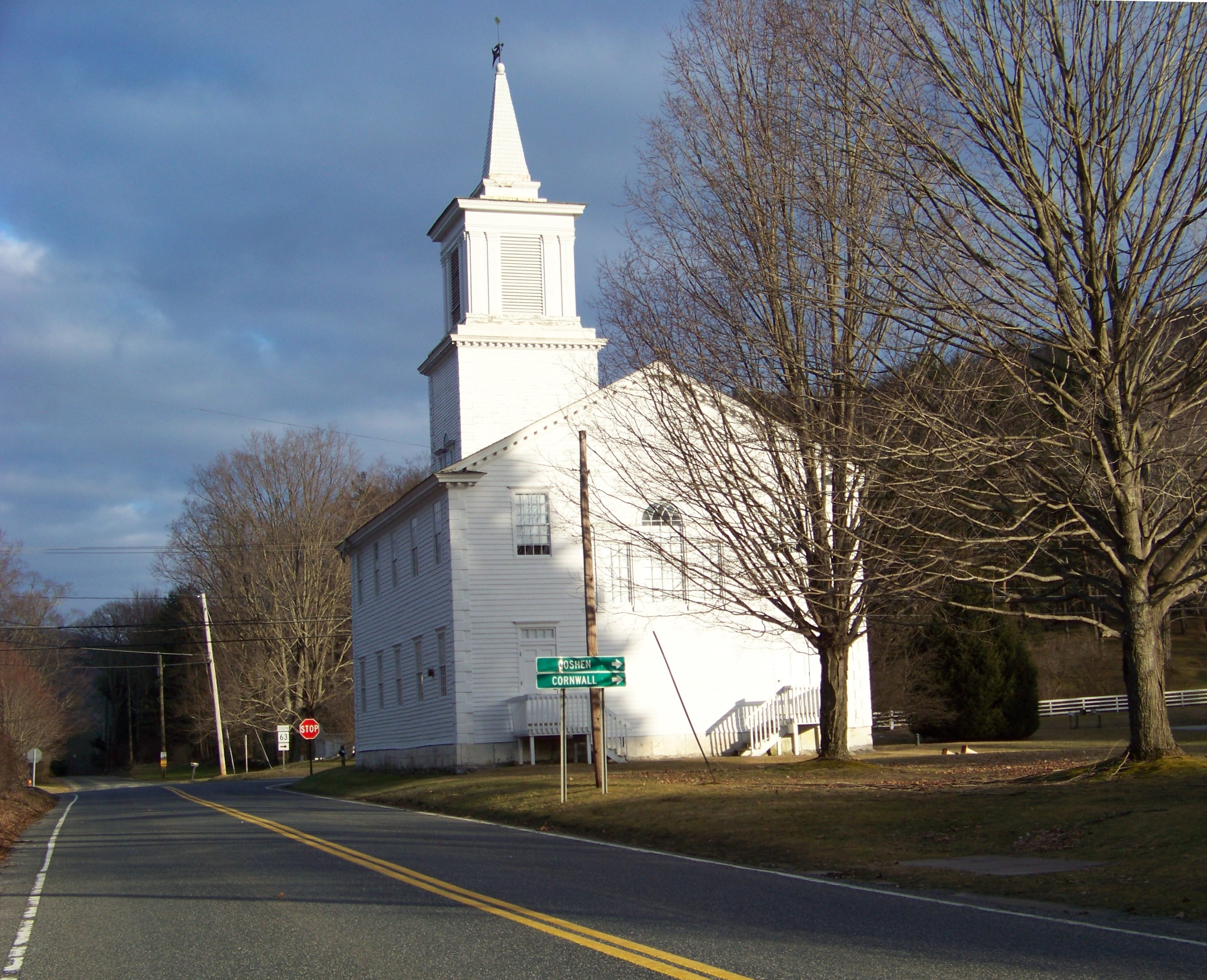

- Location within Connecticut Location within the United States
- Location: CT 63 and Barnes Road, Canaan, Connecticut
- Coordinates: 41°57′42″N 73°20′7″W
- Area: 0.8 acres (0.32 ha)
- Built: 1804
- Architect: Dutton, Thomas
- Architectural style: Federal
- NRHP reference No.: 83001272
- Added to NRHP: March 16, 1983

The South Canaan Congregational Church is a historic Congregational church building at Connecticut Route 63 and Barnes Road in the town of Canaan, Connecticut. Built in 1804, it is a remarkably well-preserved example of early Federal period church architecture. It was listed on the National Register of Historic Places in 1983.

== Description and history ==
The South Canaan Congregational Church is located in central western Canaan, at the southwest corner of Barnes Road and CT 63. It is a two-story wood-frame structure, with a gabled roof, clapboarded exterior, and stone foundation. A two-stage square tower rises from the roof ridge, including a belfry stage and octagonal spire. The main roof eave and first tower stage cornice are decorated with modillion blocks, and the building corners have wooden quoin blocks. The front facade is three bays wide, with a project center entrance bay topped by a pedimented gable. The entrance is framed by pilasters and a pedimented gable, and is topped by a Palladian window; Palladian windows are also found on the first stage of the tower, and at the building rear above the pulpit. The interior retains the original early 19th-century layout, and a wealth of high-quality Federal decorative woodwork.

The South Canaan Church is one of three Connecticut churches modeled after a church in Pittsfield, Massachusetts, that was built in 1793 according to a design by Charles Bulfinch. As such, it is a representative of the first generation of architecturally stylish church buildings, built between 1790 and 1810, that were replacing the earlier plain-style meetinghouses. At the time of its construction, the church's site in South Canaan was the approximate geographic center of the town of Canaan, which was then a farming community and included the area that later became the town of North Canaan. In later decades of the 19th century, South Canaan was eclipsed in importance by the new manufacturing centers of Falls Village and East Canaan and the railroad-junction community of Canaan village.

As of 1982, the building was no longer used as a church but was preserved by a local historical society.

== See also ==
- National Register of Historic Places listings in Litchfield County, Connecticut
