= Beckley Furnace Industrial Monument =

Industrial heritage site in North Canaan, Connecticut

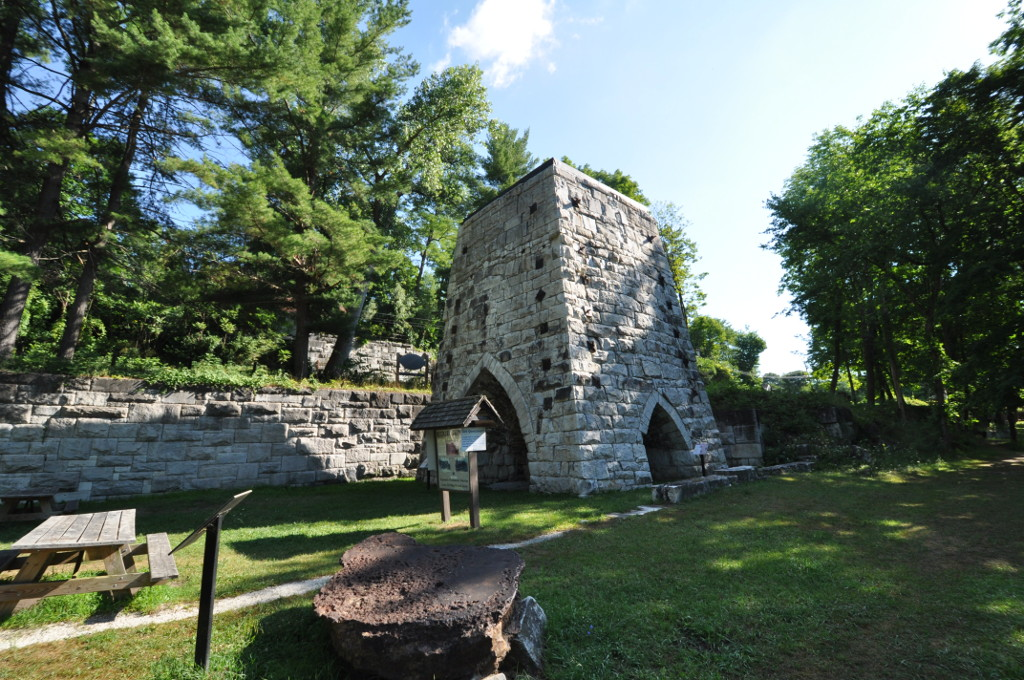

- Location within Connecticut Location within the United States
- Location: North Canaan, Connecticut, United States
- Coordinates: 42°0′39″N 73°17′34″W
- Area: 12 acres (4.9 ha)
- Designation: Connecticut state park
- Established: 1946
- Administrator: Connecticut Department of Energy and Environmental Protection
- Website: Beckley Furnace Industrial Monument
- Beckley Furnace
- U.S. National Register of Historic Places
- Area: 7 acres (2.8 ha)
- Built: 1847
- Built by: John Beckley and William Pierce
- NRHP reference No.: 78002847
- Added to NRHP: February 14, 1978

The Beckley Furnace Industrial Monument is a state-owned historic site preserving a 19th-century iron-making blast furnace on the north bank of the Blackberry River in the town of North Canaan, Connecticut. The site became a 12-acre (4.9 ha) state park in 1946; it was added to the National Register of Historic Places in 1978.

== Description ==
The Beckley Furnace stands in what is now a rural area of central North Canaan, on the south side of Lower Road just west of its junction with Furnace Hill Road. The site spans the Blackberry River, with the main blast furnace and its developed features on the north bank. The main furnace is a large stone structure, 40 feet (12 m) tall and 30 feet (9.1 m) per side at the base, gradually sloping to 20 feet (6.1 m) at the top. It is set near the road, which runs at a high elevation above a stone retaining wall. About 100 yards (91 m) upriver is the dam, a stone structure with a penstock providing access to a turbine chamber. Further downstream are the remnants of two more dams and furnaces, and there are large piles of slag mounded on the south side of the river. No longer extant are wood-frame buildings that would have been needed to support the operations of the furnace.

== History ==
The furnace was built for the production of pig iron by John Adam Beckley in 1847 and continued in operation until 1919. It was the second of three working blast furnaces built at the site; a fourth furnace was under construction in the early years of the 20th century but was never put in operation. The works successfully adapted to changing conditions, but was unable to compete on scale, and closed in the early 1920s. The stack was restored by the state in 1999. The dam built on the Blackberry River to provide power for the furnace and other industrial operations was repaired by the state in 2010.

== Activities and amenities ==
The state park offers picnicking and pond fishing. Tours of the furnace are offered periodically by Friends of Beckley Furnace.

== See also ==
- National Register of Historic Places listings in Litchfield County, Connecticut
