= James Mars =

American slave narrative author

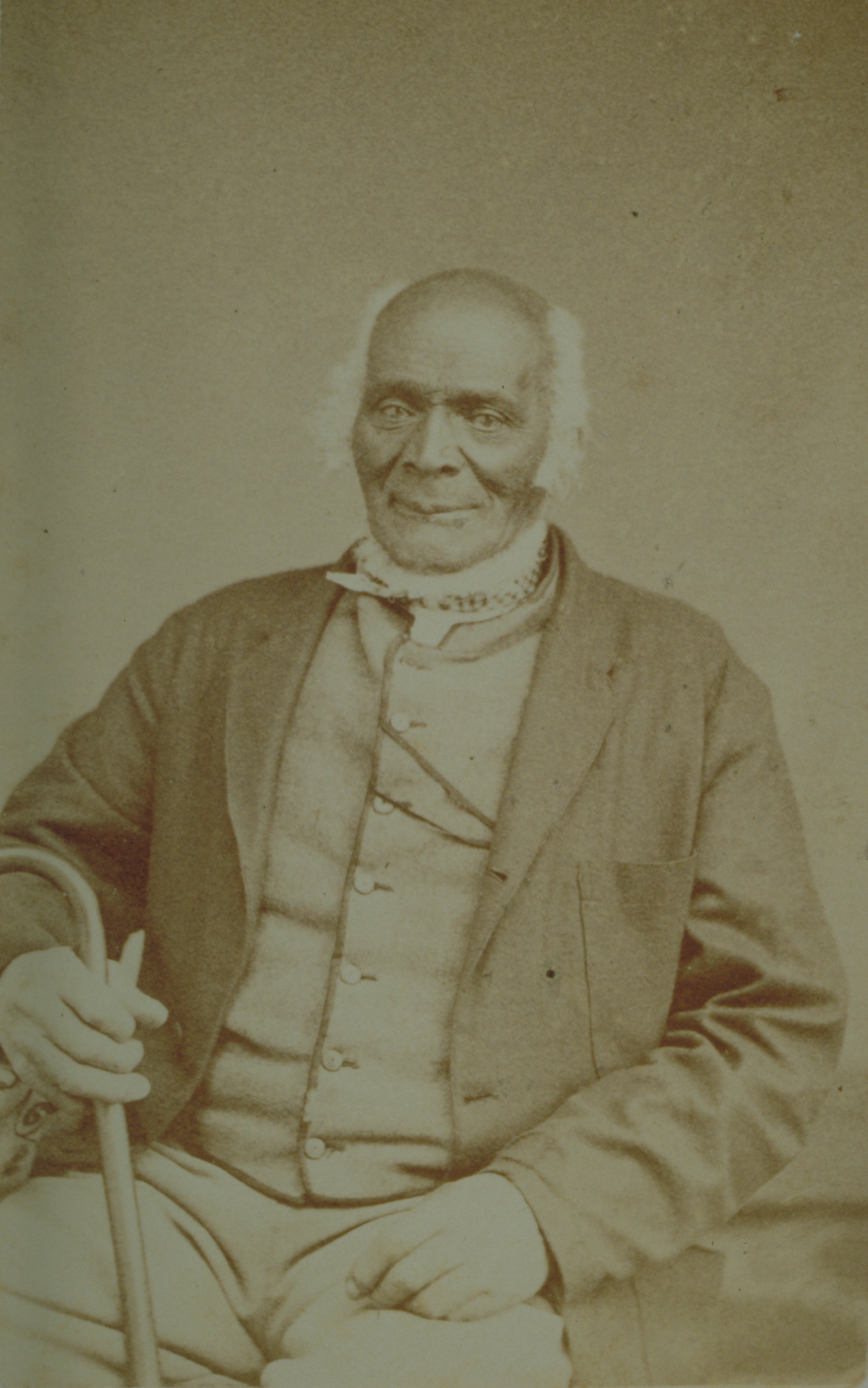
- Mars in 1870
- Born: March 3, 1790; Canaan, Connecticut, US
- Died: May 27, 1880 (aged 90); Ashley Falls, Massachusetts, US
- Writing career
- Language: English
- Subjects: Autobiography, slave narrative
- Notable works: A Life of James Mars, a Slave Born and Sold in Connecticut

James Mars (March 3, 1790 – May 27, 1880) was an American slave narrative author and political activist. Born into slavery in Canaan, Connecticut, he gained his freedom in 1811. In 1864, he published his memoir A Life of James Mars, a Slave Born and Sold in Connecticut, Written by Himself—a notable example of the slave narrative genre. His grave is a stop on the Connecticut Freedom Trail. In 2021, Governor Ned Lamont declared May 1 to be James Mars Day in Connecticut.

== Early life and emancipation ==
Mars was born into slavery in Canaan, Connecticut. His parents, Jupiter and Fanny Mars, were enslaved persons who were owned by the Reverend Amos Thompson, Canaan's Congregational minister, and by Thompson's Virginia-born wife. Jupiter Mars fought in the American Revolution. James's sister, Elizabeth, would spend 34 years as a missionary in Liberia.

In 1784, Connecticut had enacted a gradual emancipation law that freed any enslaved person born in the state on or after March 1, 1784, once the person reached a given age (in Mars's case, the age of 25). However, Thompson attempted to bypass the emancipation law by moving to Virginia, a slave state, and forcing James and his brother, sister, and parents to accompany him. The Mars family instead fled to neighboring Norfolk, Connecticut, and took refuge with white abolitionists, who kept them hidden and safe, moving from place to place, while Thompson and his agents attempted to recapture the fugitives.

By September 1798, Thompson struck a deal with the Mars family through intermediaries. As part of the deal, James Mars and his brother agreed to work as slaves in Norfolk until they turned 25. Their parents and sister would be manumitted immediately. James's new captor, a man named Munger, proved a harsh taskmaster. In 1811, Mars paid $90 (~$1,742 in 2025) to buy out his remaining years of servitude. He later reconciled with his captors and cared for the ailing Mr. Munger and his daughter until both died.

== Activist years ==
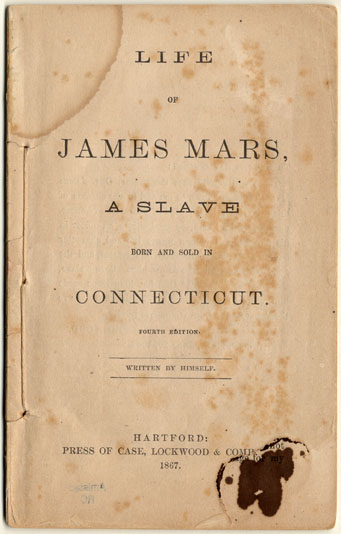
Cover of the autobiography of James Mars

Mars became a leader in New England's freedmen community and in African American reform movements for temperance and enfranchisement. During the 1830s, he worked in a dry goods store in Hartford, Connecticut, where he helped found the Talcott Street Church, in which he served as deacon alongside minister James W. C. Pennington. Mars was a principal in the 1837 landmark case Jackson v. Bulloch, in which the Connecticut Supreme Court freed a fugitive enslaved woman, Nancy Jackson, after she had lived two years in Connecticut with her Georgia captor, James Bulloch. Mars also raised funds for the legal defense of the passengers of La Amistad. By 1840, he was serving on the board of the mostly white Connecticut Anti-Slavery Society.

== Later life ==
Mars married in the early 1830s. By the time they departed Hartford, he and his wife had had eight children, one of whom died in infancy. Circa 1845, the family moved to Pittsfield, Massachusetts, where he lived for twenty years, purchased land, farmed, and continued to participate in Black reform and antislavery movements. Three of his sons fought for the Union in the Civil War.

As an impoverished elderly man, Mars returned to Norfolk and published The Life of James Mars: A Slave Bought and Sold in Connecticut (Hartford: Case, Lockwood & Company, 1864). The pamphlet-length book went through at least six editions, including a 1868 edition that included more details of his later life. Mars explained that he wrote his memoirs because "some told me that they did not know that slavery was ever allowed in Connecticut, and some affirm that it never did exist in the State."

In August 1879, Mars was granted a pension by the State of Connecticut. He died less than a year later in Ashley Falls, Massachusetts. He was interred in the Center Cemetery in Norfolk.
