= Dean's Ravine Falls =

Waterfall in Connecticut

Coordinates: 41°55′10″N 73°20′39″W

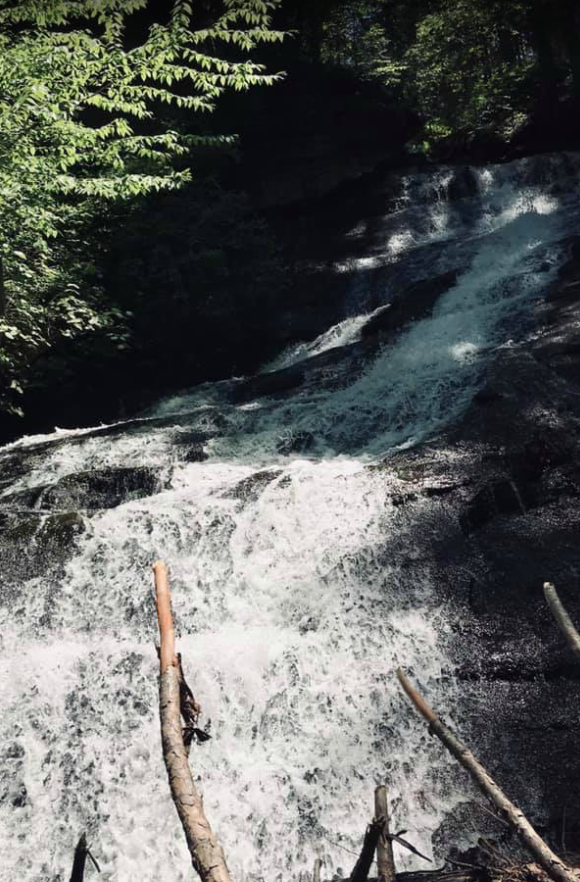
Front view of Dean's Ravine Falls

Dean's Ravine Falls is a 50-foot-tall (15 m) waterfall formed along Reed Brook in Canaan, Connecticut. The falls were once a "must-see" spot along the 2,180-mile-long Appalachian Trail, until the trail was rerouted west of the Housatonic River through Sharon, Connecticut in the early 1980s. Today, it can be accessed via The Mohawk Trail from a parking area located at the intersection of Music Mountain Road and Cream Hill Road.

== See also ==
- List of waterfalls
