= Canaan Pine Grove Association Camp Meeting =

- U.S. National Register of Historic Places
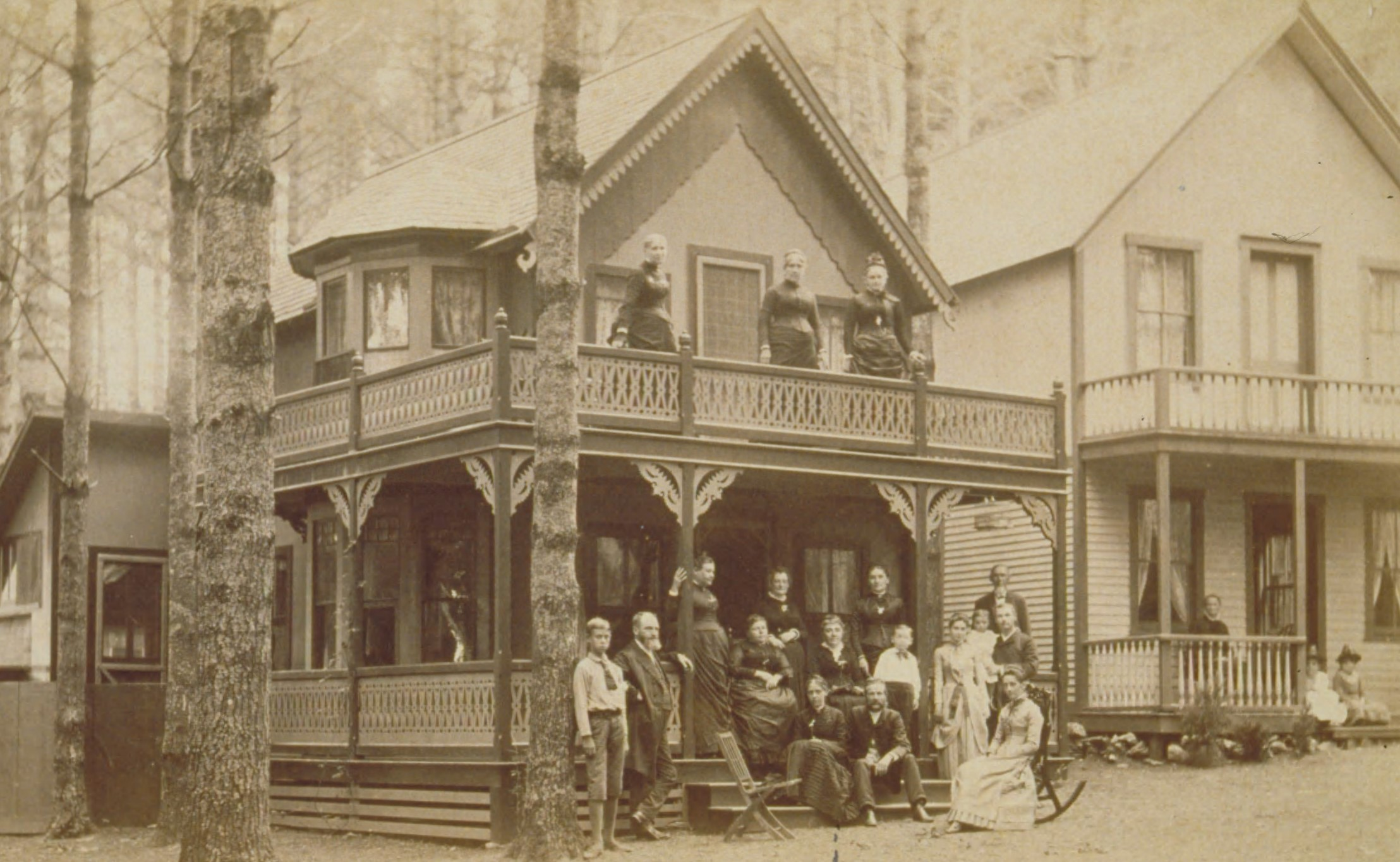
- Location: Address Restricted, Canaan, Connecticut
- Area: 67 acres (27 ha)
- Built: 1871
- Architectural style: Victorian, Vernacular, Gothic Revival
- NRHP reference No.: 100006592
- Added to NRHP: May 20, 2021

The Canaan Pine Grove Association Camp Meeting, otherwise known as Pine Grove, is a historic campground located in Canaan, Connecticut, established in 1871 as part of the Methodist camp meeting movement at the time. The property was laid out in accordance with the plans of larger but similar associations at Ocean Grove & Sea Cliff, containing 55 cottages, a chapel, and a community house. It was listed on the National Register of Historic Places in 2021.

== Description and history ==
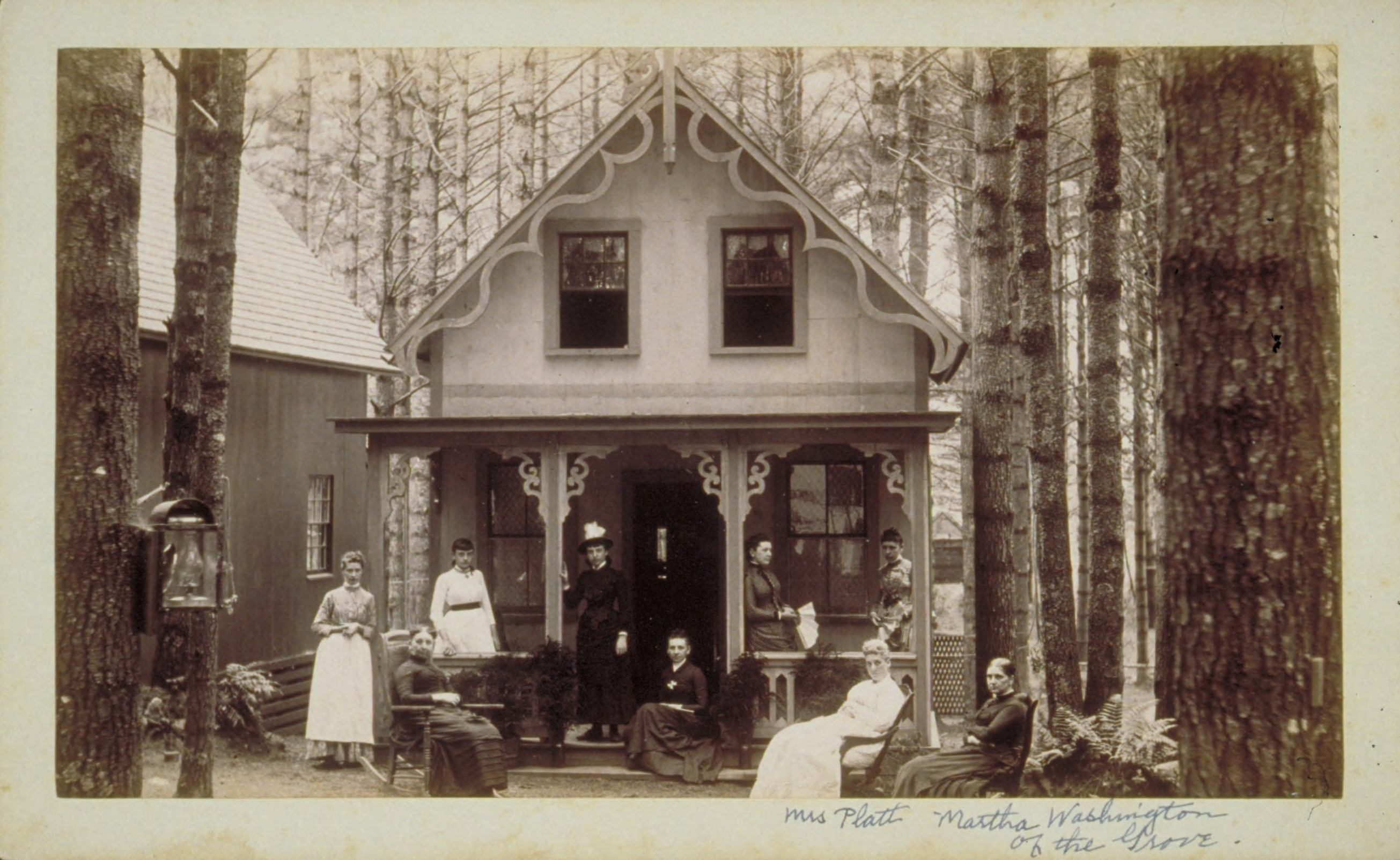
Gothic Revival architecture, typical of the cottages at Pine Grove

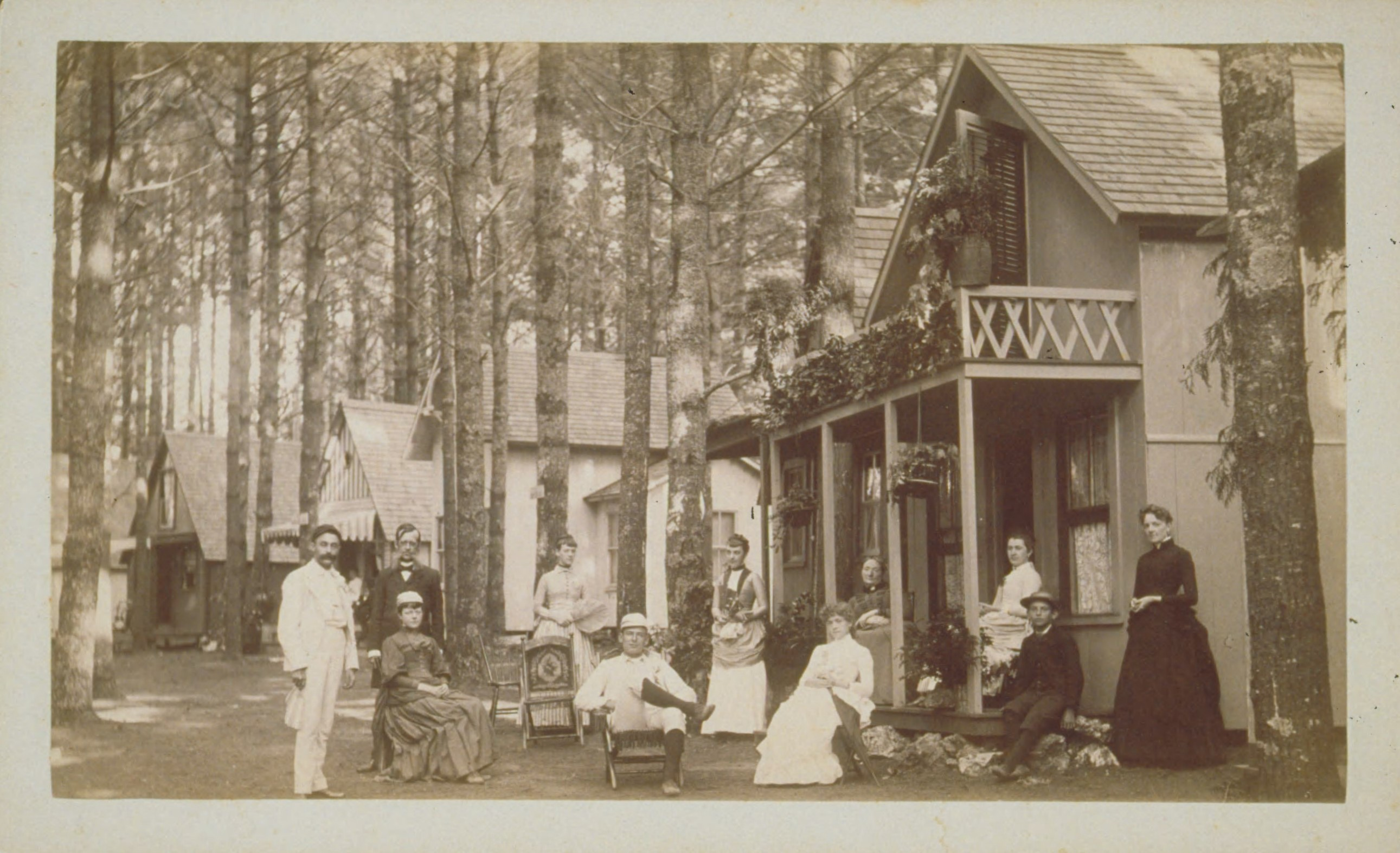
Other Victorian cottages in the pines

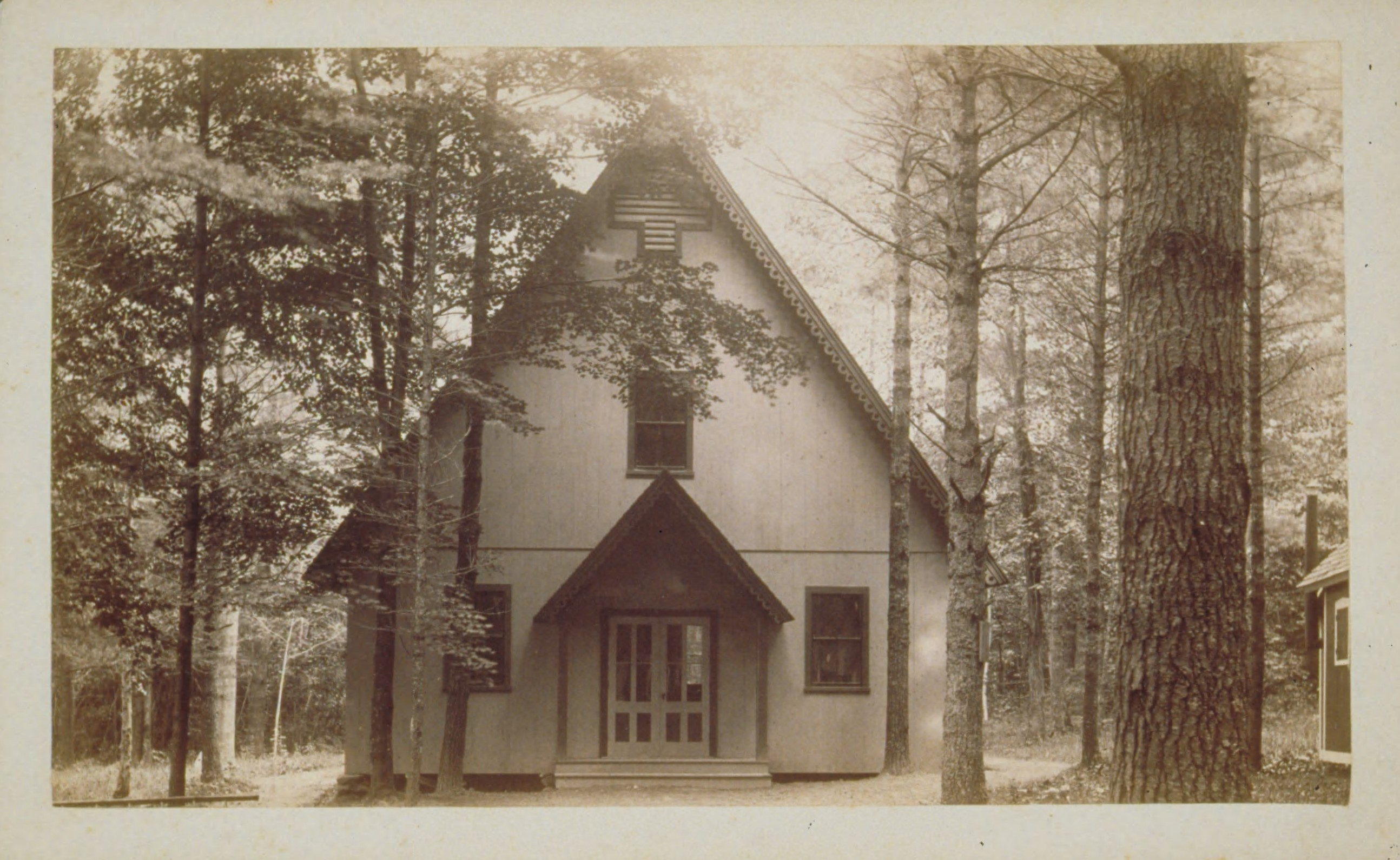
The Chapel at Pine Grove

Following a wave of Methodism sweeping through regions of New York and New England, the Pine Grove campground became a mecca for faithful pilgrims. It began in the summer of 1860, when the Poughkeepsie district of the Church held a modest week-long camping retreat, in which attendees pitched tents on what was then rented picnic grounds.

However, attendance grew steadily in the years following its official establishment in 1871. By the late 1870s-early 1880s, there were as many as 10,000 guests at Pine Grove, coming from as far away as Hartford, New Haven and New York City. A seasonal railroad station on the Housatonic R.R. was established to facilitate travel for the high volume of visitors. By this time, an ample collection of Victorian cottages had been built on the property, along with a lodging house, called the Mountain View Inn.

Approaching the twentieth century, Pine Grove had become a notable Chautauqua.
