= William Lawrence House =

William Lawrence House may refer to:

- William Lawrence House (Taunton, Massachusetts), listed on the NRHP in Taunton, Massachusetts
- William Lawrence House (Bellefontaine, Ohio), listed on the NRHP in Ohio
