= Cyrus Prindle =

American abolitionist (1800–1885)

Cyrus Prindle (April 11, 1800 – December 1, 1885) also written as Cyrus Pringle, was an American abolitionist, Methodist Episcopal minister, writer, and one of the founders of the Wesleyan Church. He was born in Canaan, Connecticut, and entered the New York conference in 1821. An abolitionist in principle, he was removed from important appointments to the poorest, and in 1843 with others he seceded from the Methodist Episcopal Church and founded the Wesleyan Church. When the movement had accomplished its purpose, with about 100 others of his ministerial associates, he returned to the Methodist Church.

Prindle published the book, Sinfulness of American Slavery (1841), where he denounced enslavement and servitude. He died on December 1, 1885, in Cleveland, Ohio.
