= Canaan Union Depot =

- Union Depot
- U.S. National Register of Historic Places
- U.S. Historic district – Contributing property
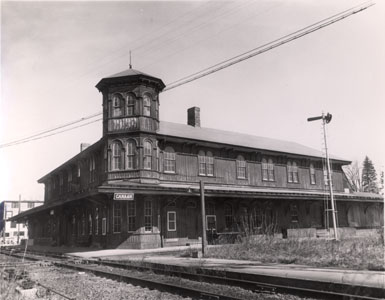
- The Union Depot during its working life.
- Interactive map of Union Depot
- Location: North Canaan, Connecticut
- Coordinates: 42°1′34″N 73°19′46″W
- Built: 1872
- Architect: G. H. Bundy
- Architectural style: Gothic
- Part of: Canaan Village Historic District (ID90001800)
- NRHP reference No.: 72001317

Significant dates
- Added to NRHP: April 26, 1972
- Designated CP: December 13, 1990

The Canaan Union Depot, also known as the Union Depot, is located in Canaan Village, in the town of North Canaan, Connecticut, and is a former union station. It was built in 1872 at the junction of the Housatonic Railroad and the Connecticut Western Railroad which was acquired by the Central New England Railway.

== Architecture ==
The station was located at the level junction between the two rail lines, making an almost right angle at 85 degrees right at the crossover. The angle of the building has a 3-story tower, at the top of which sat the electric telegraph operator. The two 90-foot (27-meter) wings of the building were occupied by the two railroad companies. The first floor of the station had a large restaurant that was especially important before the development of the dining car. Eventually, both the Central New England and the Housatonic Railroad became a part of the New York, New Haven and Hartford Railroad. The New Haven was later merged into the Penn Central Transportation.

== Decline ==
The station had been a junction and transfer point for passengers shifting from north-south NYNHH trains (Berkshire Division) to east-west CNE trains (mainline: Campbell Hall to Springfield and Hartford). Passenger service on the CNE line through the station ended in 1927 when the NYNHH acquired the CNE.

The station was no longer used for passenger service after 1971 when the Penn Central ended its unnamed successor to the Berkshire train, and regular freight service on the line ended in 1974. The station then became a retail location, with a restaurant in the southeastern wing. When the railroad was reopened as the new Housatonic Railroad in 1980, the station was not repurchased, though the new company did maintain offices there for many years.

The station was added to the National Register of Historic Places in 1972, and was also included in the Canaan Village Historic District in 1990.

More than half of the station — namely the southeast half — was destroyed by arson late in the evening of October 12, 2001. The Connecticut Railroad Historical Association purchased what was left in 2003, and the organization began to restore it. Part of the building shell and the tower were restored, but work then stalled for more than a decade due to red tape required to get grant money, and negotiations with the Housatonic Rail Road over safety issues. The project got back on track in 2014. The town of North Canann solicited bids for "Rehabilitation of the Union Deport Railroad Station" in August 2015.

== Rebirth ==
In December 2018, the Great Falls Brewing Company opened in the refurbished depot. The brewery closed at the end of 2024.

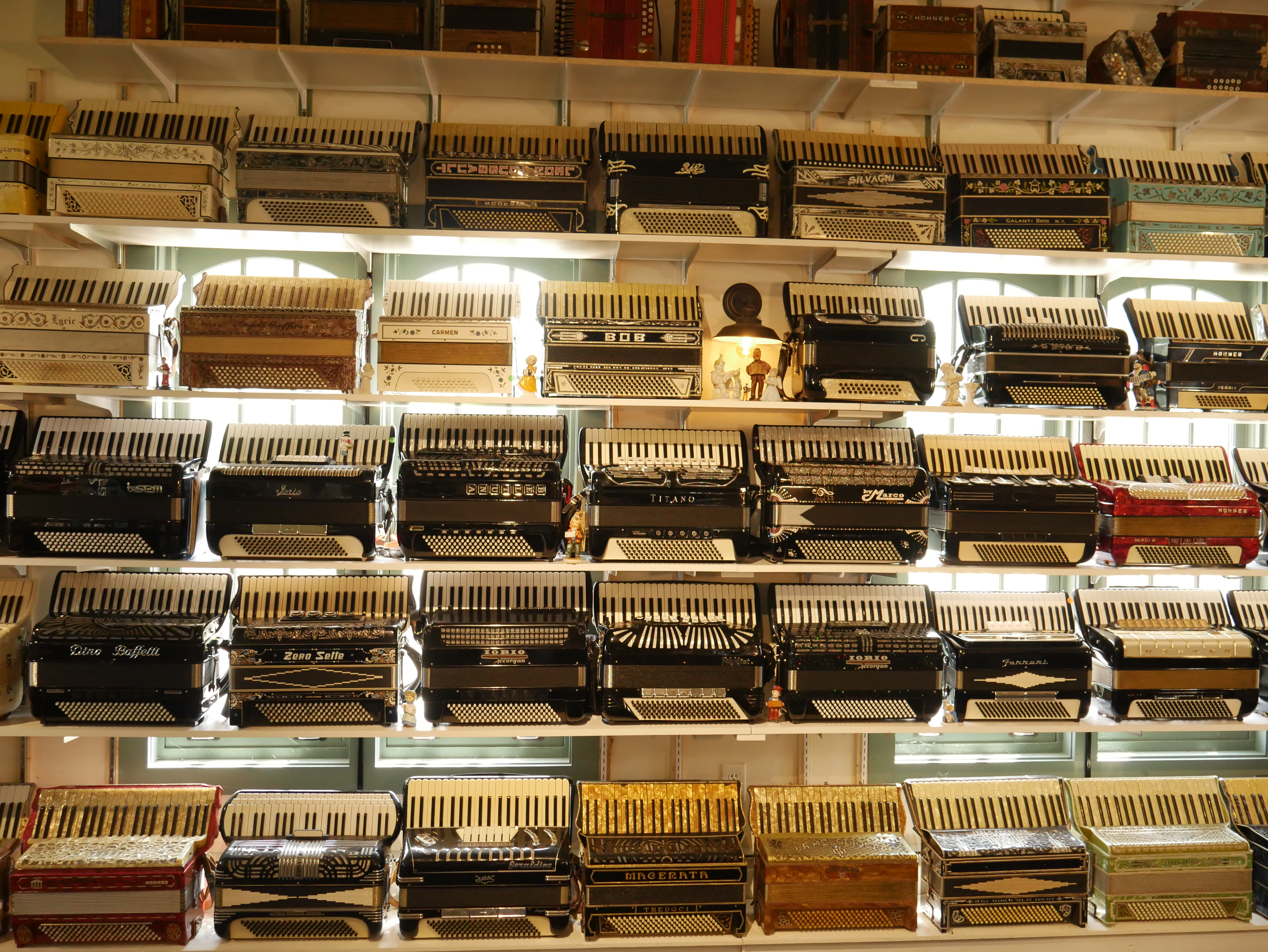
Piano accordions and button accordions on display at the New England Accordion Connection and Museum

In July 2021, the New England Accordion Connection & Museum Company moved to the refurbished station. Paul Ramunni, the owner and founder of the museum, originally created the collection in a house on his property in North Canaan in 2011. Between 1984 and 2002, Ramunni owned part of the station as housing for his CPA business, and he sold it after the 2001 fire. Ramunni offers tours, lessons, and even performs for his visitors. The collection of over 400 accordions is the largest privately owned collection of accordions in the world.

== See also ==
- National Register of Historic Places listings in Litchfield County, Connecticut
