= Canaan (village), Connecticut =

- Canaan Village Historic District
- U.S. National Register of Historic Places
- U.S. Historic district
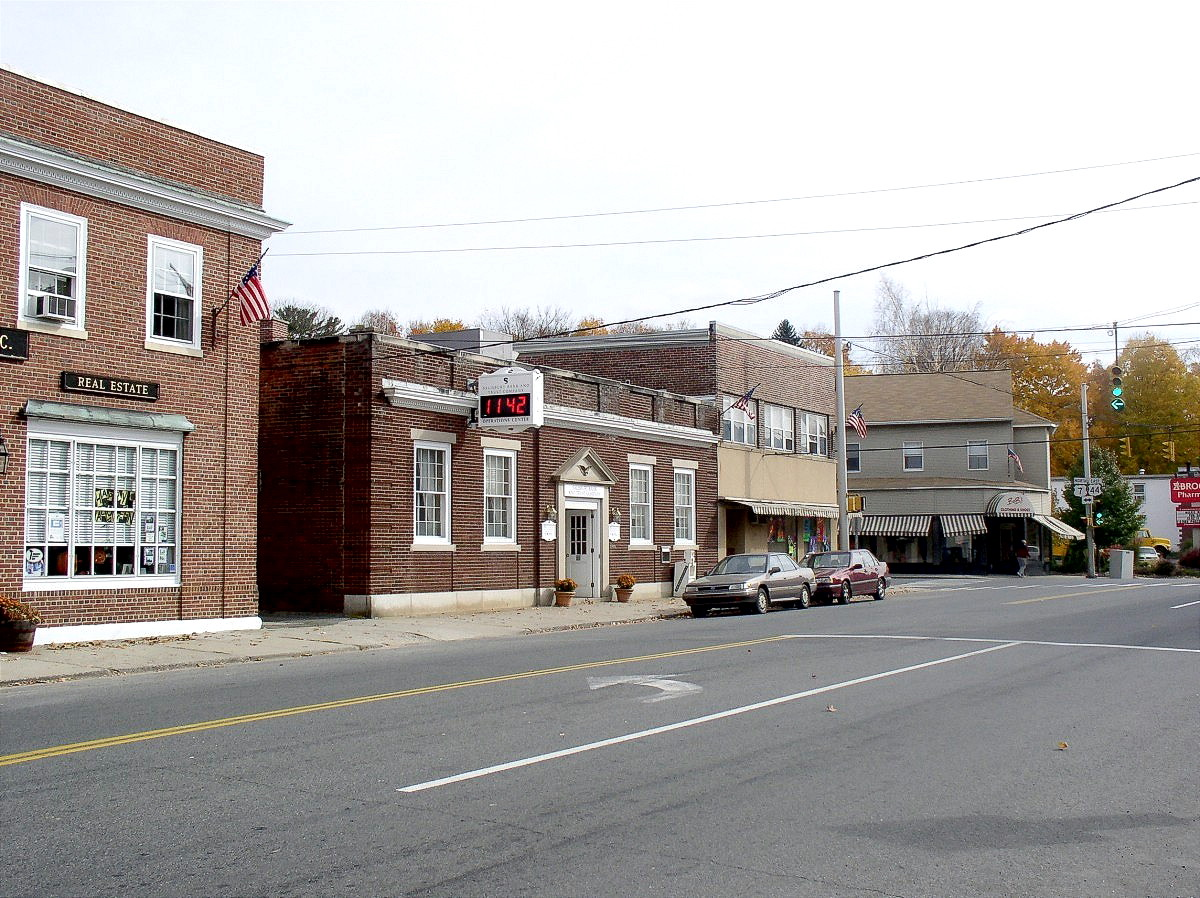
- Main Street

- Location within Connecticut Location within the United States
- Location: Roughly bounded by West Main, Bragg & Orchard Streets & Granite Avenue, North Canaan, Connecticut
- Coordinates: 42°1′44″N 73°19′52″W
- Area: 93 acres (38 ha)
- Built: 1872
- Architect: Lorrain, E.R.
- Architectural style: Colonial Revival, Queen Anne, Vernacular Picturesque
- NRHP reference No.: 90001800
- Added to NRHP: December 13, 1990

Canaan, Connecticut
- Census-designated place
- Location in Litchfield County, Connecticut
- Country: United States
- State: Connecticut
- Town: North Canaan

Area
  - Total: 1.75 sq mi (4.52 km^{2})
  - Land: 1.75 sq mi (4.52 km^{2})
  - Water: 0 sq mi (0.0 km^{2})
- Elevation: 679 ft (207 m)

Population (2010)
  - Total: 1,212
  - Density: 695/sq mi (268.4/km^{2})
- Time zone: UTC-5 (EST)
  - Summer (DST): UTC-4 (EDT)
- ZIP Code: 06018
- Area code: 860
- FIPS code: 09-10870
- GNIS feature ID: 2378340

Canaan is a village and census-designated place (CDP) within the town of North Canaan in Litchfield County, Connecticut, United States. Formerly known as Canaan Depot, the village is more commonly known as Canaan Village to distinguish it from the town of Canaan located to the south of North Canaan. The Canaan Village Historic District is listed on the National Register of Historic Places. As of the 2010 census, the CDP had a population of 1,212, out of a total population of 3,315 in the town of North Canaan.

The historic district comprises about 93 acres (380,000 m^{2}), covering the central business district and surrounding residences of the village that preserve the period from the mid-19th to early 20th centuries. Canaan village developed as a regional commercial center, first by the construction of the north–south Housatonic Railroad, and then by the arrival of the east–west Connecticut Western Railroad. This junction made the village a major transit point for bringing the area's commercial goods to market. The district includes the Canaan Union Depot, built in 1872 to serve the two railroads.

The Canaan Fire Company was established in 1911.

== Geography ==
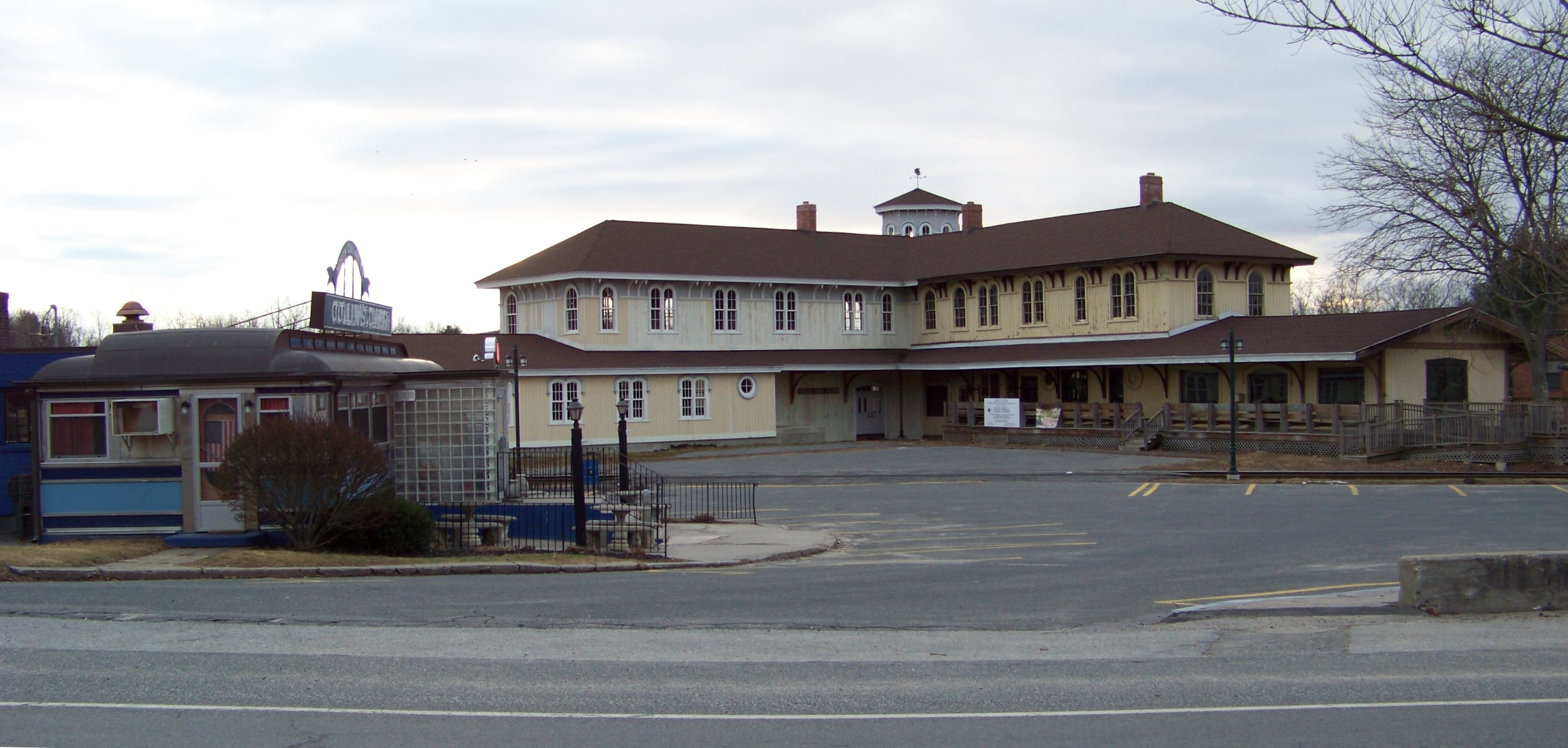
The Collin's diner, on the National Register of Historic Places, and Canaan Depot building (since refurbished and used as a brewery).

Canaan village is in the northwestern corner of the town of North Canaan. The CDP is bordered to the west, across the Housatonic River, by the town of Sheffield, and to the north by the town of Sheffield in Berkshire County, Massachusetts. The Blackberry River, a tributary of the Housatonic, forms the southern edge of the CDP. The eastern border of the CDP follows (from north to south) U.S. Route 7 (Ashley Falls Road), North Elm Street, Granger Lane, Daisy Hill Road, Lime Kiln Road, East Main Street (U.S. Route 44), and Elm Street (US 7 south) to the Blackberry River.

According to the United States Census Bureau, the CDP has a total area of 1.7 square miles (4.5 km^{2}), all land.

== Demographics ==
As of the census of 2000, there were 1,288 people, 597 households, and 337 families residing in the CDP. The population density was 289.1 people/km^{2} (749 people/mi^{2}). There were 622 housing units at an average density of 139.6 units/km^{2} (362 units/mi^{2}). The racial makeup of the CDP was 95.96% White, 1.48% Black or African American, 0.16% Native American, 0.39% Asian, 0.00% Pacific Islander, 0.78% from other races, and 1.24% from two or more races. 4.11% of the population were Hispanic or Latino of any race.

There were 597 households, out of which 27.3% had children under the age of 18 living with them, 40.5% were married couples living together, 12.7% had a female householder with no husband present, and 43.4% were non-families. 38.7% of all households were made up of individuals, and 19.1% had someone living alone who was 65 years of age or older. The average household size was 2.16 and the average family size was 2.89.

In the CDP the population was spread out, with 22.5% under the age of 18, 7.3% from 18 to 24, 28.3% from 25 to 44, 21.8% from 45 to 64, and 20.0% who were 65 years of age or older. The median age was 40 years. For every 100 females, there were 87.8 males. For every 100 females age 18 and over, there were 81.5 males.

The median income for a household in the CDP was $30,438, and the median income for a family was $44,000. Males had a median income of $31,861 versus $23,375 for females. The per capita income for the CDP was $18,816. 6.7% of the population and 5.2% of families were below the poverty line. 3.5% of those under the age of 18 and 6.2% of those 65 and older were living below the poverty line.

== Education ==
It is in the North Canaan School District.

== See also ==
- National Register of Historic Places listings in Litchfield County, Connecticut
