= Dr. Elmo N. Lawrence House =

Historic house in North Carolina, United States

- U.S. National Register of Historic Places
- Location within North Carolina Location within the United States
- Location: 2121 Lake Wheeler Rd., Raleigh, North Carolina
- Coordinates: 35°45′9″N 78°40′5″W
- Area: 2.6 acres (1.1 ha)
- Built: c. 1922
- Architectural style: Bungalow/craftsman
- MPS: Wake County MPS
- NRHP reference No.: 05000320
- Added to NRHP: April 20, 2005

Dr. Elmo N. Lawrence House is a historic home located near Raleigh, Wake County, North Carolina. It was built about 1922, and is a 1 1/2-story, five-bay, Bungalow / American Craftsman-style dwelling built of concrete block and coated in cement stucco. It has a side-gable roof with shed dormers. Also on the property is a contributing garage.

It was listed on the National Register of Historic Places in 2005.
