= Phineas Lawrence House =

Historic house in Massachusetts, United States

- U.S. National Register of Historic Places
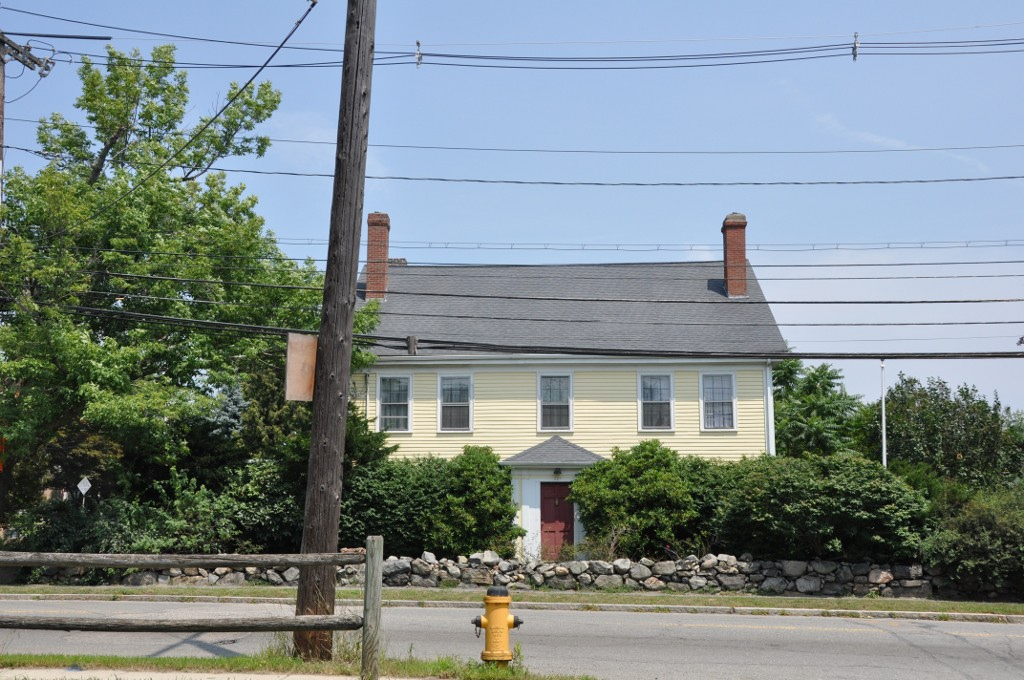

- Location within Massachusetts Location within the United States
- Location: 257 Trapelo Rd., Waltham, Massachusetts
- Coordinates: 42°23′43″N 71°12′25″W
- Built: 1810
- Architectural style: Federal
- NRHP reference No.: 87001397
- Added to NRHP: August 20, 1987

The Phineas Lawrence House is a historic house at 257 Trapelo Road in Waltham, Massachusetts. The 2 1/2-story wood-frame house was built c. 1807-08 by Phineas Lawrence, member of the locally prominent Lawrence family, who had owned land in the northeastern part of Waltham since the 17th century. The house is a well-preserved example of Federal styling. The Lawrence properties were extensive, and included land that was used for the nearby Metropolitan State Hospital.

The house was listed on the National Register of Historic Places in 1987.

== See also ==
- National Register of Historic Places listings in Waltham, Massachusetts
