= Blackberry River =

Blackberry River (Alternately, Blackburn River, Blackbury River, and other names)
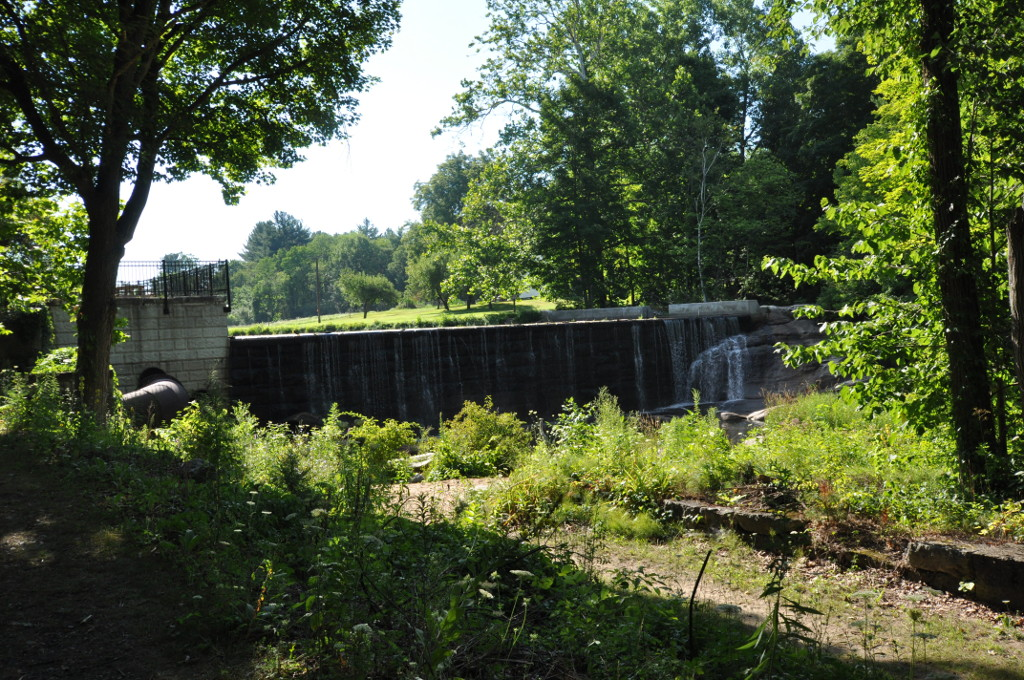
- Blackberry River dam at Beckley Iron Furnace Beginning and end of Blackberry River in Connecticut

Location
- Country: United States
- State: Connecticut
- County: Litchfield
- Towns: Norfolk, North Canaan

Physical characteristics
- Source: Confluence of Wood Creek and Spaulding Brook
  - location: Norfolk
  - coordinates: (41°59′38″N 73°12′10″W)
  - elevation: 1,130 ft (340 m)
- Mouth: Housatonic River
  - location: North Canaan
  - coordinates: (42°01′58″N 73°20′50″W)
  - elevation: 643 ft (196 m)
- Length: 9.64 mi (15.51 km)
- Basin size: 17,341.03 acres (7,017.67 ha)
- Width
  - maximum: 55 feet (17 m)
- Depth
  - maximum: 8 feet (2.4 m)

Basin features
- River system: Housatonic
- Tributaries
  - left: Whiting River
  - right: Dunning Brook, Roaring Brook

The Blackberry River is a westward-flowing river located entirely in the far northwest corner of the U.S. state of Connecticut. The river runs for nine miles (14 km) through the towns of Norfolk and North Canaan, where it empties into the Housatonic River. The river provided waterpower for industrial purposes from the early 1700s through the first part of the 20th century.

== Watershed ==
The river's watershed covers approximately 17,341 acres (7,018 ha) in the Connecticut towns of Canaan, North Canaan and Norfolk, as well as a portion of New Marlborough, Massachusetts.

== Historic sites ==
The river passes the historic Moseley House-Farm, a colonial mansion dating from 1763 in Norfolk, and the Beckley Furnace Industrial Monument in North Canaan.
