= William Lawrence House (Bellefontaine, Ohio) =

Historic house in Ohio, United States

- U.S. National Register of Historic Places
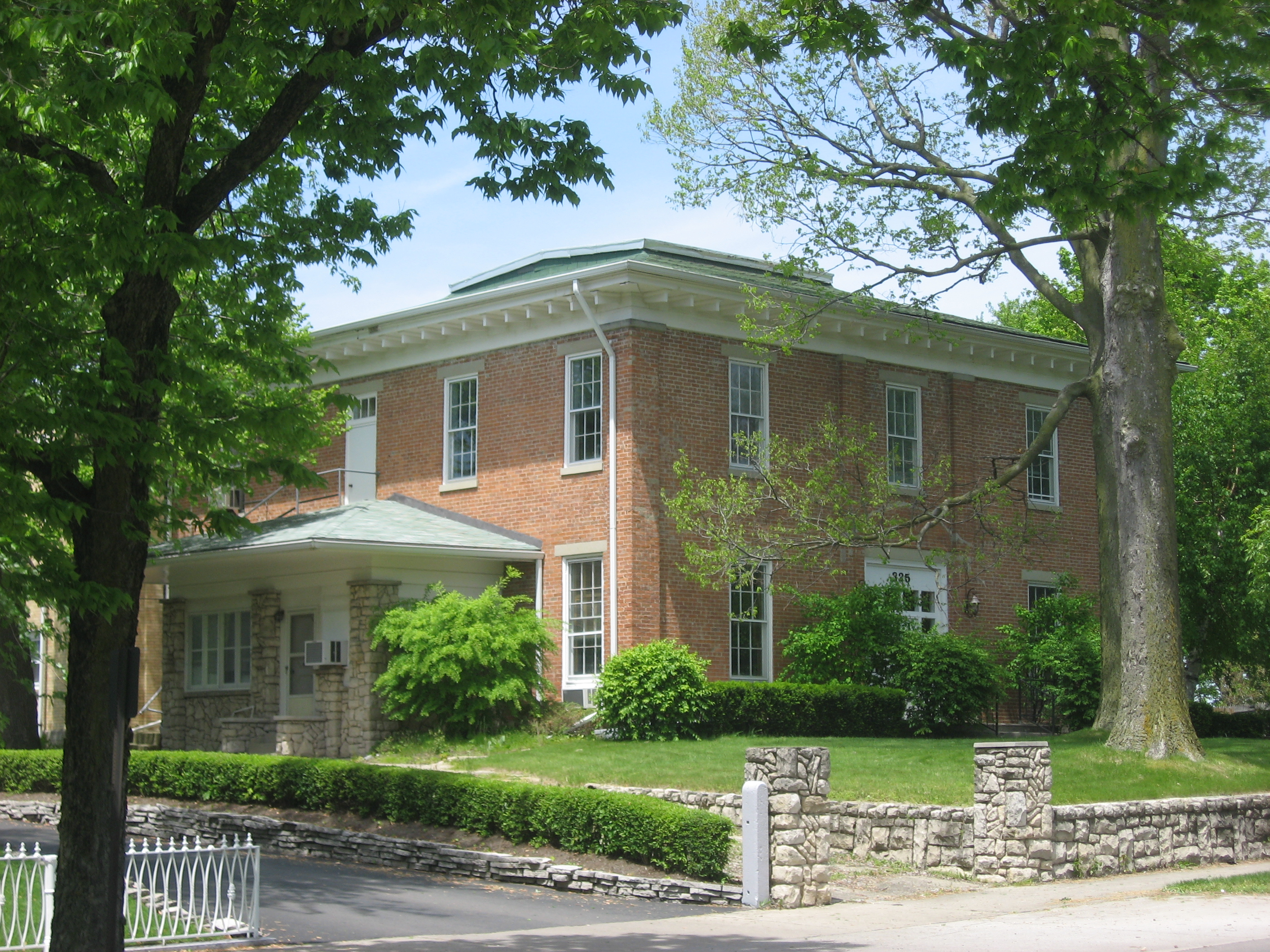
- Front and side of the Lawrence House

- Location within Ohio Location within the United States
- Location: 325 N. Main St., Bellefontaine, Ohio
- Coordinates: 40°21′55″N 83°45′35″W
- Area: 0.6 acres (0.24 ha)
- Built: 1860
- Architectural style: Italianate
- NRHP reference No.: 79001884
- Added to NRHP: August 24, 1979

The William Lawrence House is a historic house in Bellefontaine, Ohio, United States. Located along Main Street (U.S. Route 68) north of the city's downtown, it is historically significant as the home of William Lawrence, a prominent U.S. Representative during the late nineteenth century.

== Structure ==
The house is a square two-story structure, measuring approximately 50 feet (15 m) on each side, and topped with a hip roof; its brick walls rest on a stone foundation with a basement. At the time of construction, the house included multiple chimneys, but with one exception these have all been removed. Other changes since the time of construction have included the replacement of multiple doors and the addition of a wing in the rear and a small stone porch on the southern side. With the exception of the removal of shutters from the windows, the Main Street front of the house differs little from its state when built. Inside, many original features remain, including walnut panelling and two cherry fireplaces. The most prominent original feature is the spiral staircase, which climbs from the first floor to a skylight above the second floor. Lawrence's original dining room and kitchen were damaged by a fire; soon after new owners purchased the house in 1947, the rooms were completely reworked and converted into a storage room for the rear wing.

== Home of a politician ==
=== Construction ===
The Lawrence House was built circa 1860 in a modified version of the Italianate style. While the exact date of construction is unknown, its terminus ante quem is 1861: in this year, a member of the Lawrence family incised initials and the date into a windowsill.

=== Life of Lawrence ===
Born in Mount Pleasant in eastern Ohio in 1819, Lawrence was trained as a lawyer and moved to Logan County in 1841, where he lived for most of the rest of his life. During his years in Bellefontaine, he served in various county offices, was elected to both houses of the Ohio General Assembly, served six terms in the United States House of Representatives, and was appointed to the office of First Comptroller of the Treasury. Lawrence was known professionally as an expert on land law; he was the primary lawyer on behalf of Great Plains farmers who won nearly 1,000,000 acres (400,000 ha) of land in a prominent lawsuit against railroad companies. As a leading member of Logan County society, he served on the board of trustees of Geneva College in Northwood from 1851 to 1854. In his private life, he was deeply interested in agriculture; after his death, his estate included multiple farms.

Lawrence purchased from P.S. Powell a lot at the intersection of Main Street and High Avenue in Bellefontaine in 1852; here he built his house approximately eight years later. He owned the property until 1897, when he conveyed it to his family; however, he continued to live there until his death two years later.

== After Lawrence ==
Lawrence's widow Caroline sold the house to a Dr. W.W. Hamer in 1901; in it, Hamer operated Bellefontaine's first hospital. Later owners included a family who lived in the house, the Howard Kerr American Legion Post, and B.O. Beatty, the owner of a car dealership. After owning the house for only a short while, Beatty sold it to the recently founded Calvary Baptist Church, which quickly began to remodel the property. Two years of renovation included the addition of the rear wing, which was used as a sanctuary, and the removal of the kitchen and dining room that had been burned while the house was used by the American Legion; the rest of the house was used as offices and Sunday School classrooms. Members of the church first worshipped at the property on March 6, 1949.

After growing membership forced Calvary Baptist to build a new house of worship in 1972, the house remained vacant until it was bought by a partnership of lawyers. The law office remains in the house today; the rear addition has been converted into offices that are used by other businesses.

In 1979, the William Lawrence House was listed on the National Register of Historic Places. While its high degree of preservation was seen as significant, the house was added to the Register primarily for its association with Lawrence.
