= William Lawrence House (Taunton, Massachusetts) =

Historic house in Massachusetts, United States

- U.S. National Register of Historic Places
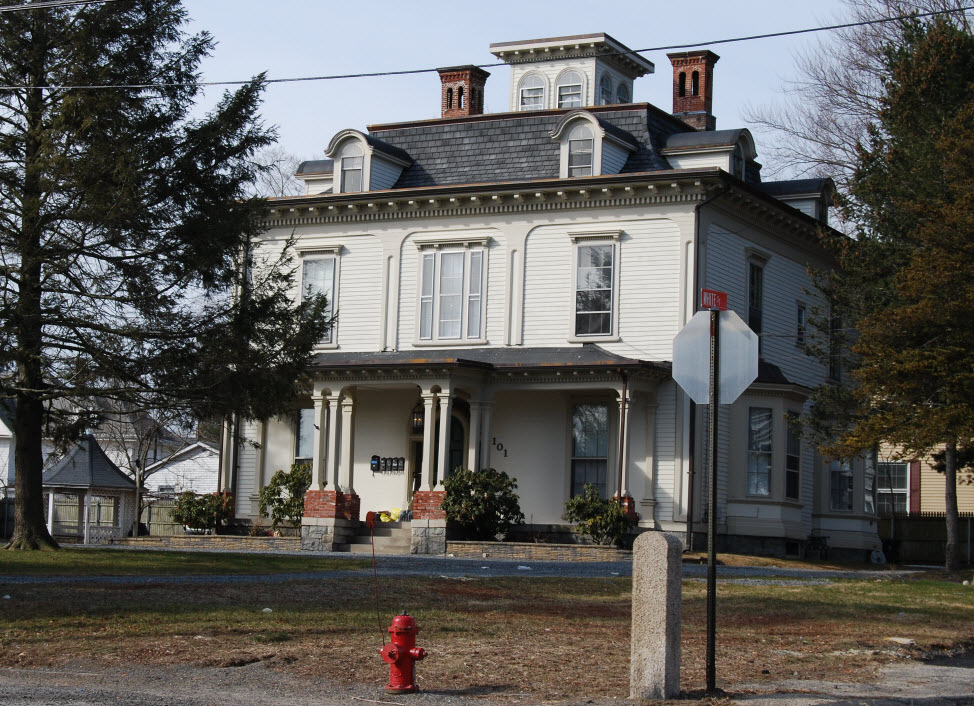
- 101 Somerset Avenue

- Location within Massachusetts Location within the United States
- Location: Taunton, Massachusetts
- Coordinates: 41°53′36″N 71°5′36″W
- Built: 1860
- Architect: Abel Burt
- Architectural style: Second Empire, Italianate
- MPS: Taunton MRA
- NRHP reference No.: 85001531
- Added to NRHP: July 10, 1985

The William Lawrence House is a historic house at 101 Somerset Avenue in Taunton, Massachusetts. It was built in 1860 by local carpenter Abel Burt for William Lawrence, a salesman. It is a two-story roughly square wood-frame structure, with a mansard roof topped by a cupola. The main entrance is set in a round-arch opening with a transom window, and its front porch features chamfered posts. The house contains a unique mix of Italianate elements, such as its square plan, large cupola and bracketed eaves, combined with Second Empire elements such as its unusual Mansard roof with ogee curve sides and pronounced dormers.

The house was added to the National Register of Historic Places in 1985.

== See also ==
- National Register of Historic Places listings in Taunton, Massachusetts
