= Canaan, Connecticut =

- Town
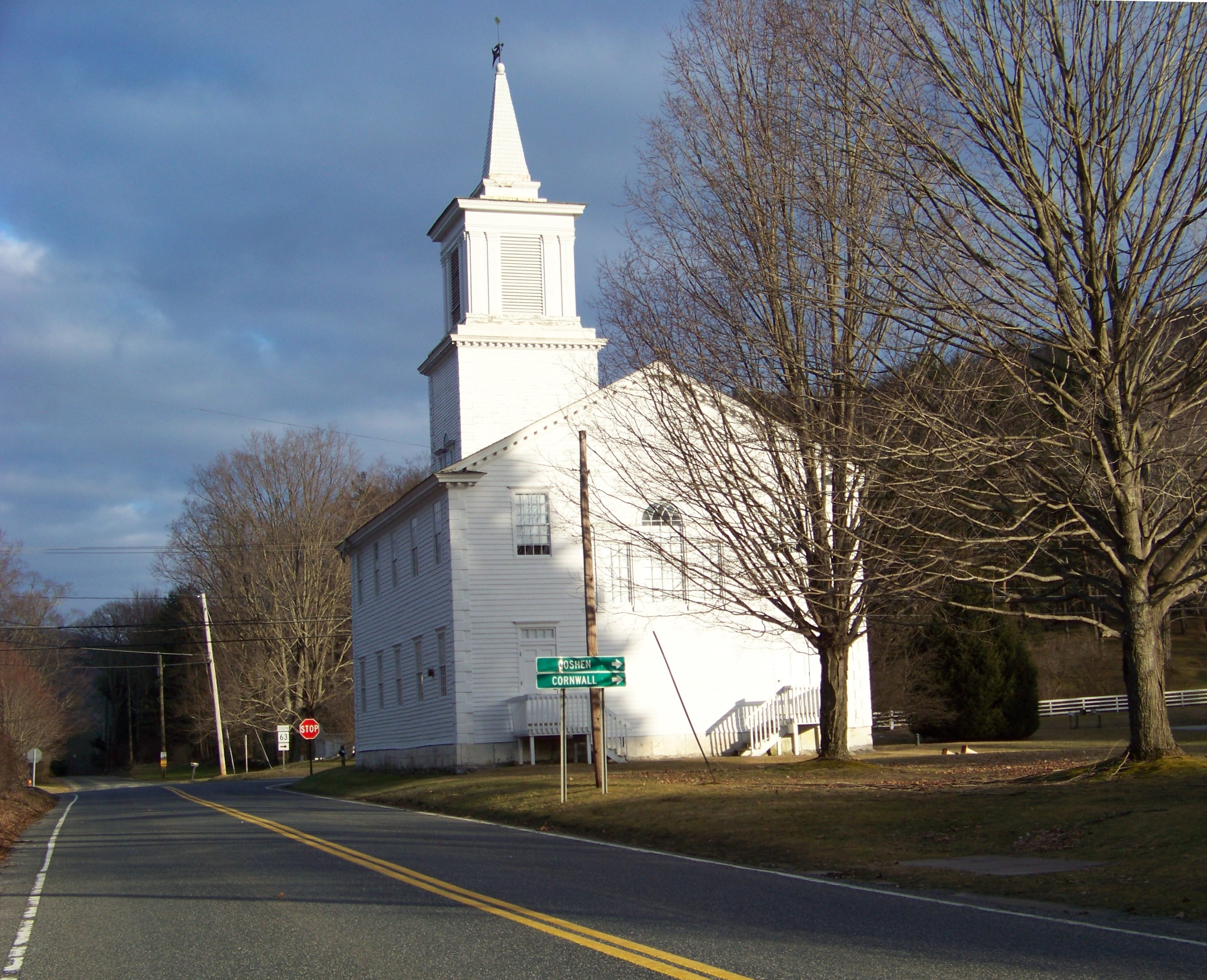
- South Canaan Congregational Church

- Seal
- Interactive map of Canaan, Connecticut
- Coordinates: 41°57′42″N 73°18′30″W
- Country: United States
- U.S. state: Connecticut
- County: Litchfield
- Region: Northwest Hills
- Incorporated: 1739

Government
  - Type: Selectman-town meeting
  - First Selectman: Henry Todd (R)
  - Selectmen: David Barger (D); Greg Marlowe (R)

Area
  - Total: 33.24 sq mi (86.08 km^{2})
  - Land: 32.91 sq mi (85.24 km^{2})
  - Water: 0.32 sq mi (0.84 km^{2})
- Elevation: 660 ft (200 m)

Population (2020)
  - Total: 1,080
  - Density: 32.8/sq mi (12.7/km^{2})
- Time zone: UTC−5 (EST)
  - Summer (DST): UTC−4 (EDT)
- ZIP code: 06031
- Area codes: 860/959
- FIPS code: 09-10940
- GNIS feature ID: 0213402
- Website: www.canaanfallsvillage.org

Canaan is a town in Litchfield County, Connecticut, United States. The population was 1,080 at the 2020 census, down from 1,234 at the 2010 census. The town is part of the Northwest Hills Planning Region. The town of Canaan is often referred to locally by the name of its principal settlement, Falls Village.

== Geography ==
Canaan is in northwestern Litchfield County; it is bordered to the north by the town of North Canaan, to the east by Norfolk, to the south by Cornwall, and to the west, across the Housatonic River, by Salisbury. It is 17 miles (27 km) northwest of Torrington, 46 miles (74 km) north of Danbury, and 17 miles (27 km) south of Great Barrington, Massachusetts.

According to the United States Census Bureau, the town of Canaan has a total area of 33.2 square miles (86.1 km^{2}), of which 32.9 square miles (85.2 km^{2}) are land and 0.3 square miles (0.8 km^{2}), or 0.97%, are water.

=== Principal communities ===
- Falls Village (town center)
- Huntsville
- Lower City
- South Canaan

== History ==
The town was incorporated in 1739. The name "Canaan" is derived from the Hebrew name for a Semitic-speaking civilization and region of the Southern Levant. It was founded in 1739, eight years after the unrelated settlement (in today's Fairfield County, Connecticut) of New Canaan.

== Demographics ==
Historical population
Census	Pop.	Note	%±
1820	2,332		—
1850	2,627		—
1860	1,408		−46.4%
1870	1,257		−10.7%
1880	1,157		−8.0%
1890	970		−16.2%
1900	820		−15.5%
1910	702		−14.4%
1920	561		−20.1%
1930	565		0.7%
1940	555		−1.8%
1950	708		27.6%
1960	790		11.6%
1970	931		17.8%
1980	1,002		7.6%
1990	1,057		5.5%
2000	1,081		2.3%
2010	1,234		14.2%
2020	1,080		−12.5%
U.S. Decennial Census

As of the census of 2000, there were 1,081 people, 445 households, and 298 families residing in the town. The population density was 32.8 inhabitants per square mile (12.7/km^{2}). There were 610 housing units at an average density of 18.5 per square mile (7.1/km^{2}). The racial makeup of the town was 97.04% White, 1.48% Black or African American, 0.19% Asian, 0.09% Pacific Islander, 0.37% from other races, and 0.83% from two or more races. Hispanic or Latino people of any race were 0.37% of the population.

There were 445 households, out of which 30.3% had children under the age of 18 living with them, 57.8% were married couples living together, 7.2% had a female householder with no husband present, and 33.0% were non-families. 27.6% of all households were made up of individuals, and 10.6% had someone living alone who was 65 years of age or older. The average household size was 2.43 and the average family size was 2.97.

In the town, the population was spread out, with 23.6% under the age of 18, 5.9% from 18 to 24, 27.5% from 25 to 44, 28.8% from 45 to 64, and 14.2% who were 65 years of age or older. The median age was 42 years. For every 100 females, there were 95.1 males. For every 100 females age 18 and over, there were 98.6 males.

The median income for a household in the town was $54,688, and the median income for a family was $62,500. Males had a median income of $40,438 versus $29,219 for females. The per capita income for the town was $35,841. About 3.0% of families and 4.7% of the population were below the poverty line, including 5.6% of those under age 18 and 3.8% of those age 65 or over.

Voter registration and party enrollment as of October 29, 2019
Party	Active voters	Inactive voters	Total voters	Percentage
Republican	150	26	176	21.86%
Democratic	297	20	317	39.38%
Unaffiliated	258	50	308	38.26%
Minor Parties	4	0	4	0.50%
Total	709	96	805	100%

Presidential Election Results
Year	Democratic	Republican	Third Parties
2020	66.7% 437	31.9% 209	1.4% 9
2016	60.3% 357	34.3% 203	5.4% 32
2012	63.4% 384	34.7% 210	1.9% 12
2008	67.7% 429	29.8% 189	2.5% 16
2004	61.1% 378	35.4% 219	3.5% 22
2000	49.1% 288	35.9% 211	15.0% 88
1996	50.8% 302	30.3% 180	18.9% 112
1992	41.2% 237	33.4% 192	25.4% 146
1988	46.3% 241	52.6% 274	1.1% 6
1984	28.2% 151	71.0% 380	0.8% 4
1980	30.4% 153	54.6% 275	15.0% 76
1976	36.4% 170	61.2% 289	2.4% 8
1972	28.8% 146	70.6% 358	0.6% 3
1968	32.4% 140	64.4% 278	3.2% 14
1964	47.1% 202	52.9% 227	0.00% 0
1960	20.7% 89	79.3% 341	0.00% 0
1956	16.4% 68	83.6% 346	0.00% 0

== Education ==
Canaan is a member of Regional School District 1, which also includes the towns of Cornwall, Kent, North Canaan, Salisbury, and Sharon. Public school students attend Lee H. Kellogg School for grades K–8, and Housatonic Valley Regional High School for grades 9–12.

== Notable people ==
- Philo Belden, Wisconsin politician
- Steve Blass, former Major League Baseball pitcher and current broadcaster
- Major Felten, artist and illustrator
- James Mars, slave narrative author
- Judson Philips, author of mystery novels
- Cyrus Prindle, abolitionist and one of the founders of the Wesleyan Church
- Lemuel Roberts, Revolutionary War soldier and historian, born in Canaan in 1755
- Catherine Roraback, civil rights attorney
- Bates Turner, Vermont politician and jurist
- Elizur Wright, the "father of life insurance"

== Transportation ==
The town is served by U.S. Route 7, Route 63, and Route 126. US 7 leads north into Massachusetts and south to Danbury and Norwalk, while Route 63 leads southeast to Litchfield. Route 126 is a local road that passes through the center of Falls Village and runs north along the Housatonic River.

== Pictures ==
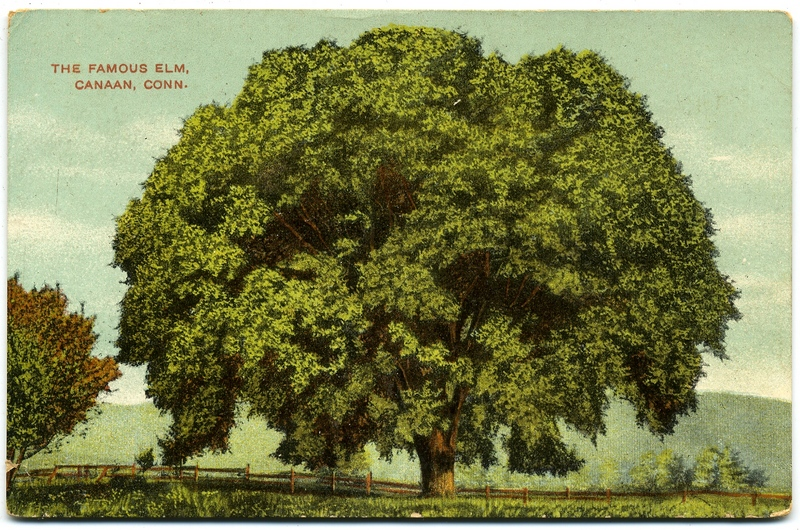
"The Famous Elm", c. 1910

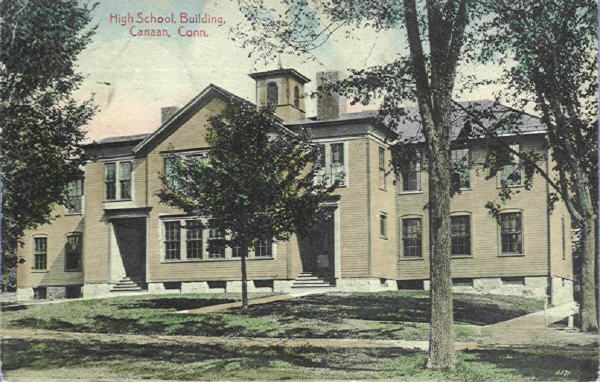
High school, 1910

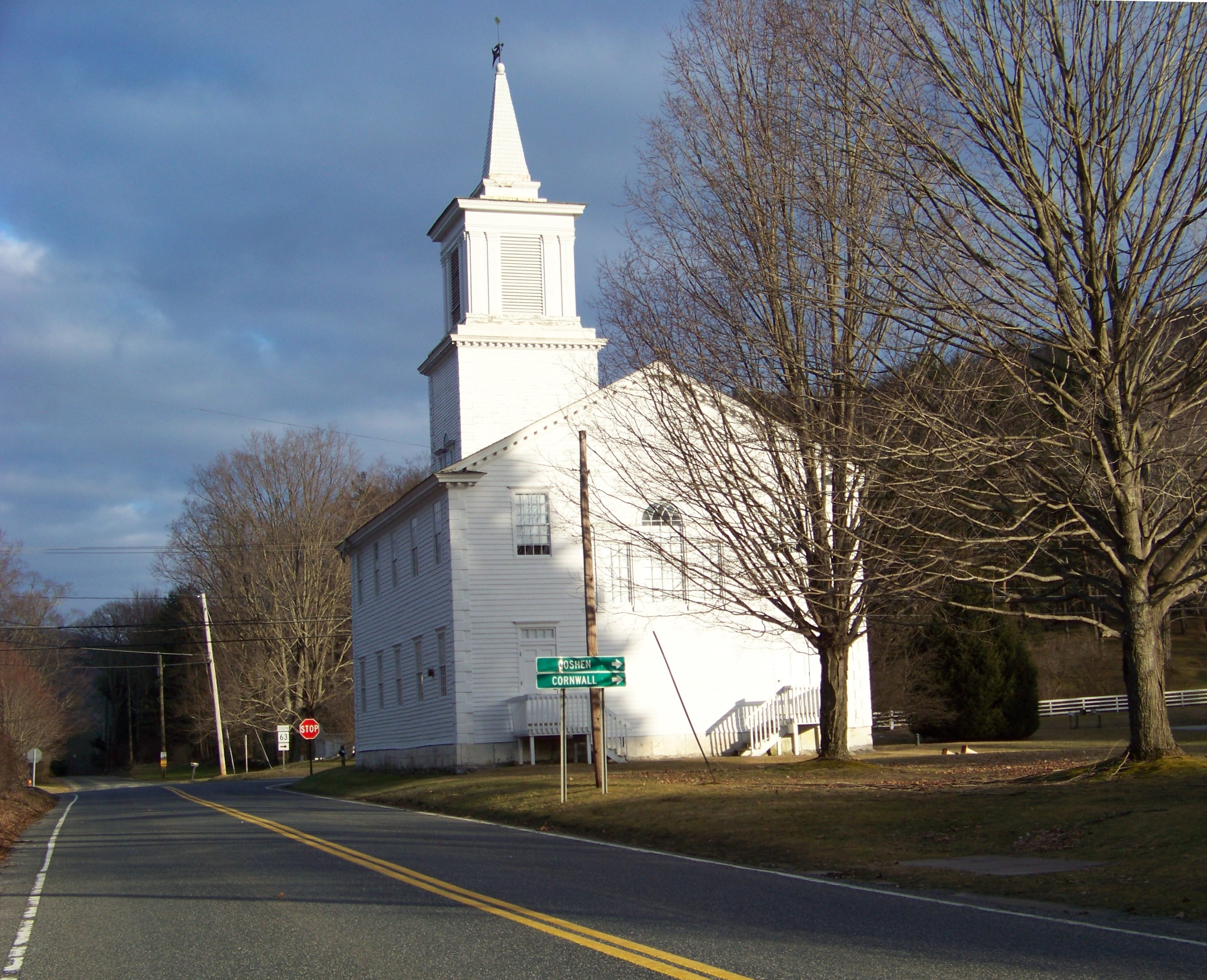
South Canaan Congregational Church
