= North Canaan, Connecticut =

- Town
- Town of North Canaan
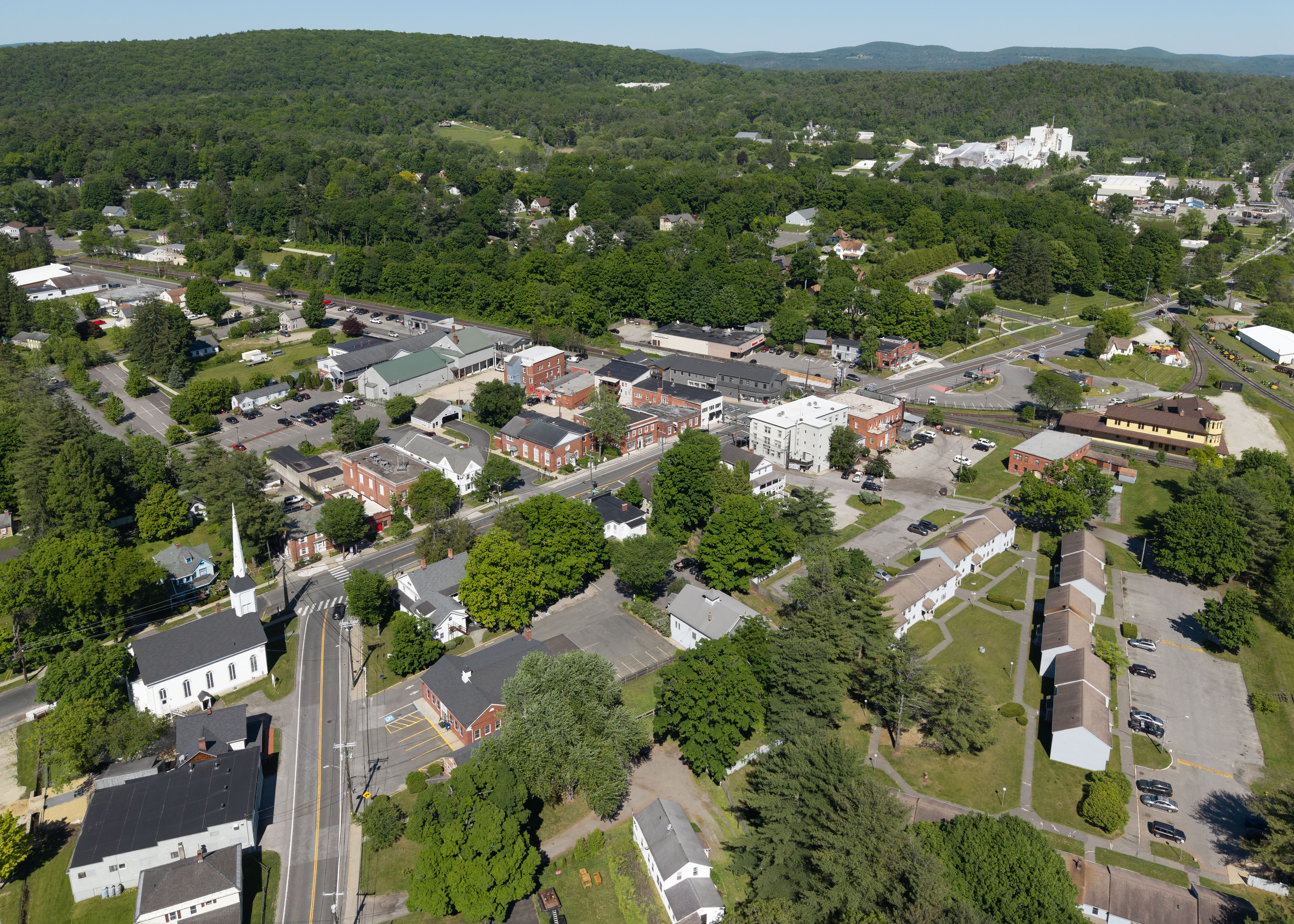
- Downtown (2026)

- Seal

- Coordinates: 42°01′21″N 73°17′27″W
- Country: United States
- U.S. state: Connecticut
- County: Litchfield
- Region: Northwest Hills
- Incorporated: 1858

Government
  - Type: Selectman-town meeting
  - First selectman: Brian Ohler
  - Selectman: Craig Whiting
  - Selectman: Christian P. Allyn

Area
  - Total: 19.5 sq mi (50.5 km^{2})
  - Land: 19.5 sq mi (50.4 km^{2})
  - Water: 0 sq mi (0.0 km^{2})
- Elevation: 823 ft (251 m)

Population (2020)
  - Total: 3,211
  - Density: 165/sq mi (63.7/km^{2})
- Time zone: UTC-5 (Eastern)
  - Summer (DST): UTC-4 (Eastern)
- ZIP codex: 06018, 06024
- Area codes: 860/959
- FIPS code: 09-54030
- GNIS feature ID: 0213478
- Website: www.northcanaan.org

North Canaan is a town in Litchfield County, Connecticut, United States. The population was 3,211 at the 2020 census. The town is part of the Northwest Hills Planning Region. The town center is still called "Canaan", being the main town center of the old town of Canaan prior to North Canaan splitting off as its own town.

== Geography ==
North Canaan is in northwestern Litchfield County and is bordered to the north by Berkshire County, Massachusetts. According to the United States Census Bureau, the town has a total area of 19.5 square miles (50.4 km^{2}), of which 0.01 square miles (0.02 km^{2}), or 0.03%, are water.

=== Principal communities ===
- Canaan village (not the same as the town of Canaan to the south)
- Canaan Valley
- East Canaan (has its own post office)
- Sodom
- East Sheffield

== Demographics ==
Historical population
Census	Pop.	Note	%±
1860	1,426		—
1870	1,695		18.9%
1880	1,537		−9.3%
1890	1,683		9.5%
1900	1,803		7.1%
1910	2,171		20.4%
1920	1,933		−11.0%
1930	2,287		18.3%
1940	2,304		0.7%
1950	2,647		14.9%
1960	2,836		7.1%
1970	3,045		7.4%
1980	3,185		4.6%
1990	3,284		3.1%
2000	3,350		2.0%
2010	3,315		−1.0%
2020	3,211		−3.1%
U.S. Decennial Census

As of the census of 2020, there were 3,211 people, 1,399 households, and 864 families residing in the town. The population density was 165 inhabitants per square mile (64/km^{2}). There were 1,444 housing units at an average density of 74.2 per square mile (28.6/km^{2}). The racial makeup of the town was 86.7% White, 1.1% African American, 0.3% Native American, 0.5% Asian, 4.9% from other races, and 6.5% from two or more races. Hispanic or Latino of any race were 8.3% of the population.

There were 1,399 households, out of which 30.0% had children under the age of 18 living with them, 50.4% were married couples living together, 9.9% had a female householder with no husband present, and 35.6% were non-families. 30.2% of all households were made up of individuals, and 13.9% had someone living alone who was 65 years of age or older. The average household size was 2.38 and the average family size was 2.98.

In the town, the population was spread out, with 23.3% under the age of 18, 6.7% from 18 to 24, 28.1% from 25 to 44, 22.9% from 45 to 64, and 19.0% who were 65 years of age or older. The median age was 40 years. For every 100 females, there were 92.6 males. For every 100 females age 18 and over, there were 89.1 males.

The median income for a household in the town was $39,020, and the median income for a family was $52,292. Males had a median income of $34,135 versus $23,705 for females. The per capita income for the town was $18,971. About 3.3% of families and 5.8% of the population were below the poverty line, including 3.1% of those under age 18 and 5.0% of those age 65 or over.

== Transportation ==
The main highways of the town are U.S. Route 7 (north-south) and U.S. Route 44 (east-west). US 7 leads north 13 miles (21 km) to Great Barrington, Massachusetts, and south 54 miles (87 km) to Danbury, while US 44 leads west 12 miles (19 km) to Millerton, New York, and east 42 miles (68 km) to Hartford, the capital of Connecticut.

The Housatonic Railroad north-south tracks run through the town on their Danbury, to Pittsfield, Massachusetts, line.

A private airfield, Triumph Air Field, is situated to the northwest of the village.

== Economy ==
Downtown Canaan Village is centered around the intersection of the former Central New England Railroad east-west tracks crossed with the active Housatonic Railroad north-south tracks. The village contains a variety of retail, restaurant, and other businesses.

The Canaan Union Depot building, a former railroad station built in 1872, is a prominent building in the downtown area. It was heavily damaged by an arson fire in 2001. From 2003 to 2018 it was restored by the Connecticut Railroad Historical Association. It is now the site of the Great Falls Brewing Company and the New England Accordion Connection and Museum Company.

East Canaan is known for its dairy farm operations and limestone mines. In 2016, East Canaan dairy farm, Freund's Farm, became the first farm in Connecticut to use robotic milking units for their dairy herd. The farm also produces CowPots™, a biodegradable plant pot made from composted cow manure.

== Education ==
North Canaan is a member of Regional School District 01, which also includes the towns of Canaan, Cornwall, Kent, Salisbury, and Sharon. Public school students attend North Canaan Elementary School from grades K–8 and Housatonic Valley Regional High School in Falls Village from grades 9–12.

== Notable people ==
- Steve Blass (born 1942), Major League Baseball pitcher for Pittsburgh Pirates
- Fidelia Bridges (1834-1923), artist of the late nineteenth century
