= Long Hill, Connecticut =

Long Hill, Connecticut may refer to:

- Long Hill, Groton, Connecticut
- Long Hill, Trumbull, Connecticut
- The Long Hill neighborhood of the city of Waterbury

== See also ==
- Long Hill (disambiguation)
