= Long Hill =

Long Hill may refer to:

== Places ==
=== Singapore ===
- Bukit Panjang (Long Hill), a residential town in Singapore

=== United Kingdom ===
- Long Hill, a section of the A5004 road, in Derbyshire, England

=== United States ===
- Long Hill, Groton, Connecticut
- Long Hill, Trumbull, Connecticut
- Long Hill (Wetipquin, Maryland), a house on the National Register of Historic Places
- Long Hill (Beverly, Massachusetts), a historic estate
- Long Hill Township, New Jersey
