= Stevenson Dam Hydroelectric Plant =

- U.S. National Register of Historic Places
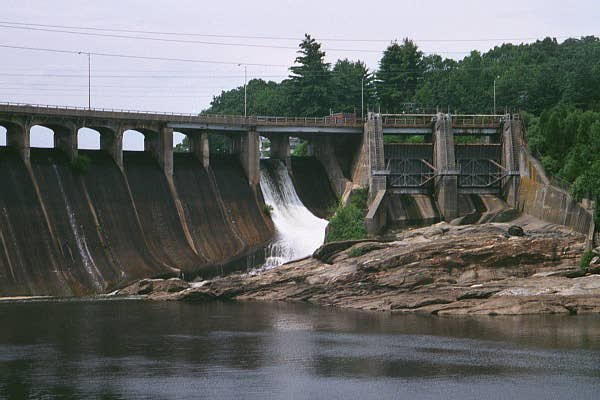
- Stevenson Dam

- Location within Connecticut Location within the United States
- Location: Housatonic River at Monroe and Oxford
- Coordinates: 41°23′3″N 73°10′16″W
- Area: 7.6 acres (3.1 ha)
- Built: 1917
- Architect: Birkinbine Engineering Office; et al.
- Architectural style: Classical Revival
- NRHP reference No.: 00001073
- Added to NRHP: September 29, 2000

The Stevenson Dam Hydroelectric Plant is a hydroelectric power plant located on the Housatonic River at the boundary between the towns of Monroe and Oxford, Connecticut. The Connecticut Light and Power Company began construction in 1917 (completed 1919) and FirstLight Power has since gained ownership. It was listed on the National Register of Historic Places in 2000 and is considered to have high hazard potential by the National Inventory of Dams. The site includes three contributing structures: the Stevenson Dam, the Stevenson Dam Bridge, and the Stevenson Powerhouse.

The Stevenson Dam Bridge, a reinforced concrete bridge that is integral with the dam, carries Route 34 across the river, making it unique among period dams in the eastern United States.

The Stevenson Powerhouse is a 160 ft by 80 ft building rising 131 ft in height. Its exterior includes "massive" pilasters. The hydroelectric plant began producing electricity in 1919 with 3 turbine/generator units, for a total of 19 MW. A fourth unit of 12 MW was added in 1936 and, with improvements over the years, the plant now produces a total of 28.9 MW of power. Bedrock characteristics required the powerhouse to be built on the Monroe side of the dam and it remains Monroe's biggest single-site taxpayer. The plant was covered in a Historic American Engineering Record (HAER) study, record CT-183.

Completion of the dam impounded the Housatonic River and created what came to be Lake Zoar, a lake with 27 miles of shoreline, and covering an area named "Pleasantvale" or "Pleasant Vale", which had been part of Oxford and Stevenson.

The Stevenson plant was developed by the Rocky River Power Company, founded in 1905 by J. Henry Roraback to produce hydroelectric power on a tributary of the Housatonic, with operating rights expanding to the entire Housatonic watershed in 1909. Roraback's company was a predecessor to the Connecticut Light and Power Company, now part of Eversource. The dam was the first high dam on the river. The project was designed by Birkinbine Engineering Office, Charles T. Main Associates of Boston, Massachusetts, and J.A.P Crisfield Co., and was built by C. W. Blakeslee Co., a local contractor.

A work camp, Camp Crisfield, was developed around the 800 men employed to work the site day and night, including a church, carpentry shops, and hospital.

An urban legend exists that asserts a worker fell into the cement as it was being poured and was never heard from again. This originates from a worker who signed in one day, and then never signed off.

== See also ==
- National Register of Historic Places listings in Fairfield County, Connecticut
- National Register of Historic Places listings in New Haven County, Connecticut
- List of bridges on the National Register of Historic Places in Connecticut
- Collection of photos of the Stevenson Dam under construction by Oxford Past
