= Connecticut Route 130 =

State highway in Fairfield County, Connecticut, US

Route 130
- Map of Fairfield County in southwestern Connecticut with Route 130 highlighted in red

Route information
- Maintained by CTDOT
- Length: 8.21 mi (13.21 km)
- Existed: 1992–present

Major junctions
- West end: US 1 in Fairfield
- Route 8 / Route 25 in Bridgeport; I-95 / Route 127 in Bridgeport
- East end: I-95 / US 1 / Route 110 in Stratford

Location
- Country: United States
- State: Connecticut
- Counties: Fairfield

Highway system
- Connecticut State Highway System; Interstate; US; State; SSR; SR; Scenic
← Route 128	→ Route 131

Route 130 is a state highway in southwestern Connecticut, running from Fairfield to Stratford, generally parallel to I-95.

== Route description ==
Route 130 begins at an intersection with US 1 in Fairfield and heads east into Bridgeport. In Bridgeport, it intersects I-95, then passes under Route 8 and I-95 twice without junctions before crossing into Stratford. In Stratford, it passes under I-95 again without a junction before intersecting I-95 a second and ending at another intersection with US 1.

Route 130 is designated the A.W. Penn Memorial Highway from the Fairfield-Bridgeport town line to State Street.

== History ==

In 1922, state roads were given number designations in New England for the first time. Modern Route 130 was originally part of New England Route 1. In 1927, the U.S. Highway system was created and New England Route 1 became part of U.S. Route 1 (US 1). In 1932, an alternate route of US 1 (US 1 Alt. was designated along North Avenue, Boston Avenue, and Barnum Avenue further inland (now modern US 1). In 1963, US 1A in the Bridgeport area was deleted and re-designated as US 1. The original US 1 alignment along Fairfield Avenue, State Street, and Stratford Avenue became unsigned state roads, with designations of SR 771 (Fairfield-Bridgeport) and SR 769 (Bridgeport-Stratford). In 1992, these were re-designated as modern Route 130.

== Major intersections ==
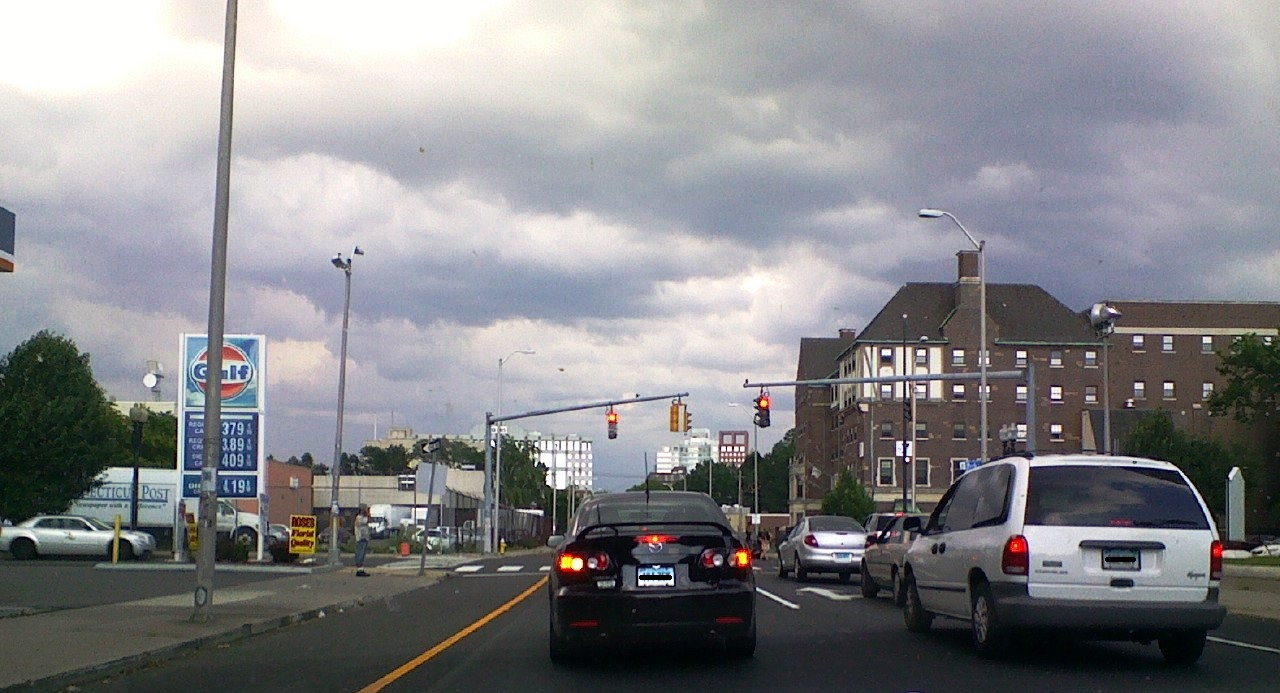
Route 130 as State Street at the intersection of Park Avenue in Bridgeport.

The entire route is in Fairfield County.

Location	mi	km	Destinations	Notes
Fairfield	0.00	0.00	US 1 to I-95 – Southport, Bridgeport	Western terminus; former Boston Post Road
Bridgeport	1.93	3.11	I-95 north – New Haven	Exit 27 on I-95 south
Bridgeport			Route 8 north / Route 25 north – Trumbull, Waterbury	Exit 1D on Route 8 south/Route 25 south
Bridgeport			Pequonnock River Bridge	
Bridgeport	4.18	6.73	I-95 south / Route 127 north	Southern terminus of Route 127; exit 29B on I-95 north
Bridgeport	4.65	7.48	I-95 – New Haven, New York City	Access via Seaview Avenue; exit 30 on I-95
Stratford	7.06	11.36	Route 113 – Sikorsky Memorial Airport	
Stratford	7.99	12.86	I-95 – New Haven, New York City	Exit 33 on I-95
Stratford	8.21	13.21	US 1 / Route 110 north – Stratford, Shelton, Waterbury, Milford, Devon	Eastern terminus; roundabout; southern terminus of Route 110
1.000 mi = 1.609 km; 1.000 km = 0.621 mi
