= Connecticut Route 127 =

State highway in Fairfield County, Connecticut, US

Route 127
- Map of Fairfield County in southwestern Connecticut with Route 127 highlighted in red

Route information
- Maintained by CTDOT
- Length: 6.80 mi (10.94 km)
- Existed: 1932–present

Major junctions
- South end: I-95 / Route 130 in Bridgeport
- Route 8 in Trumbull; Route 15 / Merritt Parkway in Trumbull; Route 25 in Trumbull
- North end: Route 111 in Trumbull

Location
- Country: United States
- State: Connecticut
- Counties: Fairfield

Highway system
- Connecticut State Highway System; Interstate; US; State; SSR; SR; Scenic
← Route 126	→ Route 128

Route 127 is a state highway in southwestern Connecticut, running entirely from Bridgeport to Trumbull. It serves as a minor arterial, connecting all four major freeways in the Bridgeport area.

== Route description ==
Route 127 begins at an intersection with Route 130 in southeastern Bridgeport and almost immediately intersects I-95. It then heads north, roughly parallel to the Pequonnock River and Route 8, into Trumbull. It intersects Route 8 just north of the Bridgeport-Trumbull town line and continues north, then turns northwest to intersect Route 15 (Merritt Parkway) and Route 25 in rapid succession. It then continues northwest to end at an intersection with Route 111 in Trumbull.

== History ==
White Plains Road was laid out to Pulpit Rock, in present-day Trumbull, in 1705. Route 127 was commissioned in 1932 and originally ran from US 1 to its current northern terminus. At an undetermined time before 1978, the southern terminus was truncated to the Huntington Turnpike (SR 730). It was extended south to US 1 in 1992, then further south to Route 130 in 1995.

== Junction list ==
The entire route is in Fairfield County.

Location	mi	km	Destinations	Notes
Bridgeport	0.00	0.00	Route 130 (Stratford Avenue)	Southern terminus
Bridgeport	0.10	0.16	I-95 south – New York City	Exit 29B on I-95 north
Bridgeport	1.40	2.25	US 1 (Boston Avenue)	
Bridgeport			Huntington Turnpike (SR 730 north)	
Trumbull	3.15	5.07	Route 8 north / Route 25 north to Route 15 south / Merritt Parkway south – Waterbury, Trumbull, Danbury	Access to Route 25 north via Old Town Road; exit 4 on Route 8 south and on Route 25 south
Trumbull	4.20	6.76	Route 15 north / Merritt Parkway north – New Haven	Exit 32B on Merritt Parkway south
Trumbull	4.87	7.84	Route 25 south – Bridgeport	Exit 5 on Route 25 north
Trumbull	6.80	10.94	Route 111 – Bridgeport, Stepney, Long Hill	Northern terminus
1.000 mi = 1.609 km; 1.000 km = 0.621 mi
