= Connecticut Route 110 =

State highway in Fairfield County, Connecticut, US

Route 110
- Map of Fairfield County in southwestern Connecticut with Route 110 highlighted in red

Route information
- Maintained by CTDOT
- Length: 15.95 mi (25.67 km)
- Existed: 1935 (extended 1952)–present

Major junctions
- South end: I-95 / US 1 / Route 130 in Stratford
- Route 15 / Merritt Parkway in Stratford; Route 8 in Shelton
- North end: Route 111 in Monroe

Location
- Country: United States
- State: Connecticut
- Counties: Fairfield

Highway system
- Connecticut State Highway System; Interstate; US; State; SSR; SR; Scenic
← Route 109	→ Route 111

Route 110 is a state highway in Connecticut running for 15.95 miles (25.67 km) from Interstate 95 (I-95) in Stratford to Route 111 in Monroe.

In Shelton, Route 110 is designated the Veterans Memorial Highway.

== Route description ==
Route 110 begins at an intersection with US 1 in Stratford and heads north along the west bank of the Housatonic River, There is an interchange with Route 15 (Merritt Parkway) before continuing into Shelton. In Shelton, it continues north along the Housatonic River, There is an interchange with Route 8, then turns northwest through the center of town and west to Monroe. In Monroe, Route 110 continues west to end at an intersection with Route 111.

== History ==
The road from Monroe to Shelton was designated as State Highway 173 in 1922. South of Shelton, most of the route following the west bank of the Housatonic River to Stratford was part of the original alignment of New England Route 8. The East Main Street portion in Stratford was Route 8A. Route 110 was commissioned in 1935, originally running from Route 111 in Monroe to Route 8 in Shelton. In 1952, Route 8 was moved west and the former section of Route 8, including the current Route 113, was reassigned to Route 110. Former Route 8A was renumbered to SR 708. In 1963, the section south of the current intersection with Route 113 was reassigned to Route 113 and the southernmost part of Route 110 was designated at its current route on East Main Street (former SR 708).

== Major intersections ==
The entire route is in Fairfield County.

Location	mi	km	Destinations	Notes
Stratford	0.00	0.00	I-95 / US 1 / Route 130 west – Stratford, Bridgeport, Airport, Devon, Milford	Southern terminus; roundabout; eastern terminus of Route 130; exit 33 on I-95
Stratford	1.30	2.09	Route 113 south (Main Street)	Northern terminus of Route 113
Stratford	3.35	5.39	Route 15 / Merritt Parkway – New Haven, New York City	Exit 36 on Merritt Parkway
Shelton	8.80	14.16	Route 8 north – Waterbury	Exit 12A on Route 8
Shelton	9.17	14.76	Route 108 south to Route 8 south – Huntington	Northern terminus of Route 108; access to Route 8 via SR 714
Shelton	9.23	14.85	Derby–Shelton Bridge (SR 712 east) to Route 34 – Derby	
Monroe	15.95	25.67	Route 111 – Long Hill, Monroe	Northern terminus; roundabout
1.000 mi = 1.609 km; 1.000 km = 0.621 mi
