= Stevenson Dam Bridge =

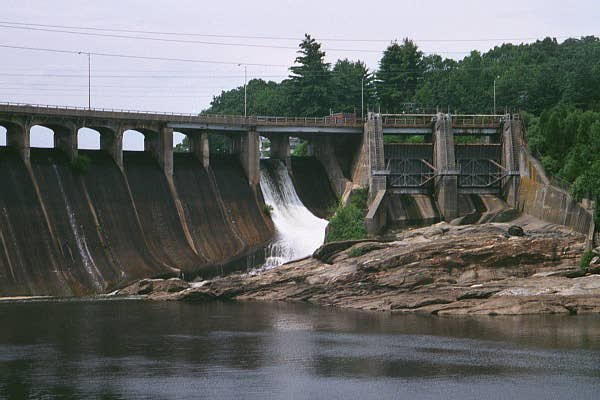
- Coordinates: 41°23′00″N 73°10′17″W
- Carries: 2 lanes of Route 34
- Crosses: Housatonic River
- Locale: Monroe and Oxford (Connecticut)
- Official name: Stevenson Dam Bridge
- Maintained by: Connecticut Department of Transportation (Owned by the Connecticut Light and Power Company)
- ID number: 1843

Characteristics
- Design: concrete arch
- Total length: 1213 ft
- Width: 42 ft

History
- Opened: 1919

Statistics
- Toll: None

The Stevenson Dam Bridge carries Connecticut Route 34 over the Housatonic River in the U.S. state of Connecticut, connecting the town of Monroe to the town of Oxford.

The Stevenson Dam Bridge sits on top of the Stevenson Dam, constructed by the Connecticut Light and Power Company. It is a concrete span featuring 24 arches. The current bridge was constructed in 1919 and is 1213 feet in length by 42 feet in width, featuring one lane in each direction for automotive traffic. It is the only highway bridge in Connecticut on a dam spillway. In 2009, the DOT estimated the dam carries approximately 10,300 vehicles per day.

It has been claimed to be one of two dams in the country with a public road over top, but this is false.

== History ==
A prior, one lane wooden suspension bridge known as "Zoar Bridge" existed just south of the confluence of the Halfway River with the Housatonic, at what is now the Monroe/Newtown town line, about 3/4 mile upstream from the dam/bridge current location. The supports for the old bridge were inundated with the construction of the dam. This bridge was not the predecessor to the current Derby-Shelton Bridge.

In the winter of 1875, a flood carried Zoar Bridge a mile down stream. In 1890, county commissioners ordered the removal of a toll house connected to the Oxford side of the bridge, as it was deemed a fire hazard.

== Renovations ==
- 1959 - New mercury vapor lights added, elimination of a sharp traffic approach.
- 1987 - 80 post tensioned anchor cables are installed to improve earthquake resiliency.
- 1979 - Widening project requires the bridge to be closed entirely to traffic for approximately six months.
- 2005 - The bridge was closed on five weekends in summer for repairs to the concrete decks.
- 2009 - A new bridge is planned for completion and has been bonded at $34 million.
