= Old Mine Park Archeological Site =

Archaeological site in Connecticut, United States

- Old Mine Park Archaeological Site
- U.S. National Register of Historic Places
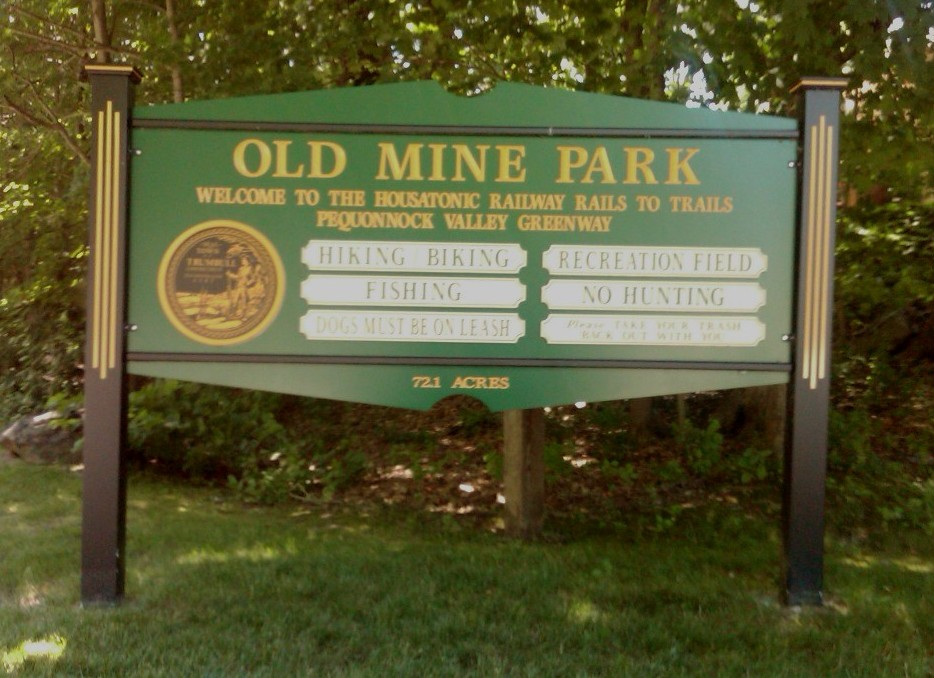
- Sign for Old Mine Park (Archeological Site)

- Location within Connecticut Location within the United States
- Location: Trumbull, Connecticut
- Coordinates: 41°17′17″N 73°13′35″W
- Area: 72.1 acres (29.2 ha)
- Built: 1757-1828
- NRHP reference No.: 90001807
- Added to NRHP: December 13, 1990

The Old Mine Park Archaeological Site is a historic site in the Long Hill section of Trumbull, Connecticut, United States. It was mined from 1828 to 1920 and during 1942-1946, and has been incorporated in a municipal park. It was added to the National Register of Historic Places in 1990.

== Historical significance ==
Hubbard Tungsten Mine at Long Hill The first mention of minerals at Saganawamps, or Old Mine Park, is found in the February 21, 1757 deed giving Howkins Nichols of Stratford a lease for 200 years of 5 acres (2.0 ha) "at a place commonly called Saganawam for obtaining ye ore or mineral substances."

Some time around 1818, Ephraim Lane took some samples of rocks he found at Saganawamps to Yale University Professor Benjamin Silliman for identification. Silliman reported, in his new American Journal of Science, that he had identified tungsten, tellurium, topaz and fluorite. Shortly after the articles were published, Ephraim Lane was making specimens available to collectors at a price and apparently to protect his supply of minerals, Lane acquired a lease to 4 acres (16,000 m^{2}) in Trumbull later to be known as "Shagamywamps the mine lot" in 1828 from Elijah Hawley. Lane then leased the land to Thomas R. Hubbard.

In 1837 the first (and at the time only) prismatic barite ore of tungsten in the United States was discovered at the mine. It was scientifically studied in 1887 by Adolph Gurlt of the University of Bonn. The area has previously been mined for copper, silver, lead and gold as well as limestone. The Hubbard Mine for tungsten was operated by the Rare Minerals Company from 1898 and later by the American Tungsten Mining and Milling Company, ceasing operations after a fire in 1916. Besides tungsten, the mine was also a source of beryl, opal, topaz, tourmaline and 60 other crystals and minerals in varying quantities.

Later on the site was demolished and a Home Depot was built nearby, many of the same crystals and minerals were found on this site. This site is closed for crystal and mineral mining

== Park ==
The Old Mine Park is a 72.1-acre (292,000 m^{2}) open space created in 1937 on the site of the mine. The park features:

- An 11-mile (18 km) loop trail for biking & hiking.
- Two Pavilions and Picnic Area
- Lavatory
- Pheobe Meadows multi-purpose field
- The Trumbull Counseling Center (121 Old Mine Road)
- A walking bridge over the Pequonnock River.

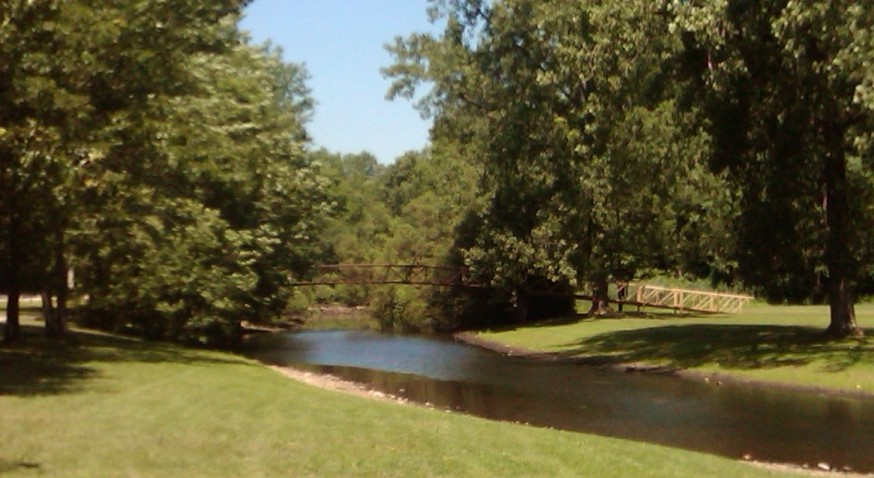
The walking bridge over Pequonnock River.

== See also ==
- National Register of Historic Places listings in Fairfield County, Connecticut
