= Merritt Parkway =

Parkway in Connecticut

Merritt Parkway
- Merritt Parkway highlighted in red

Route information
- Maintained by CTDOT
- Length: 37.67 mi (60.62 km)
- Existed: June 29, 1938–present
- Component highways: Route 15 entire length
- Tourist routes: Merritt Parkway
- Restrictions: No commercial vehicles

Major junctions
- South end: Hutchinson River Parkway at the New York state line
- US 7 in Norwalk; Route 25 in Trumbull; Route 8 / Route 108 in Trumbull
- North end: Route 15 / Wilbur Cross Parkway / Milford Parkway in Milford

Location
- Country: United States
- State: Connecticut
- Counties: Fairfield, New Haven

Highway system
- Connecticut State Highway System; Interstate; US; State; SSR; SR; Scenic
- Scenic Byways; National; National Forest; BLM; NPS
- Merritt Parkway
- U.S. National Register of Historic Places
- Architects: Connecticut Highway Department; et al.
- Architectural style: Colonial Revival, Classical Revival, Modern Movement
- NRHP reference No.: 91000410
- Added to NRHP: April 17, 1991

The Merritt Parkway (also known locally as "The Merritt") is a controlled-access parkway in Fairfield County, Connecticut, with a small section at the northern end in New Haven County. Designed for Connecticut's Gold Coast, the parkway is known for its scenic layout, its uniquely styled signage, and the architecturally elaborate overpasses along the route. As one of the first, oldest parkways in the United States, it is designated as a National Scenic Byway and is also listed in the National Register of Historic Places. Part of Route 15, it runs from the New York state line in Greenwich, where it continues the Hutchinson River Parkway, to exit 37 in Milford, where the Wilbur Cross Parkway begins. Facing bitter opposition, the project took six years to build in three different sections; the Connecticut Department of Transportation (CTDOT) constantly required additional funding because of the area's high property value. The parkway was named for U.S. Congressman Schuyler Merritt. In 2010, the National Trust for Historic Preservation called the Merritt Parkway one of "America's 11 Most Endangered Historic Places".

Trucks, buses, trailers, towed vehicles, and all vehicles 8 feet (2.4 m) tall or taller are not allowed on any part of the parkway due to its low bridges, narrow lanes, and tight curve radii.

The roadway signs of the Merritt feature a blue shield with white lettering, along with the foliage of Kalmia latifolia, commonly known as the mountain laurel, the state flower of Connecticut.

== Route description ==
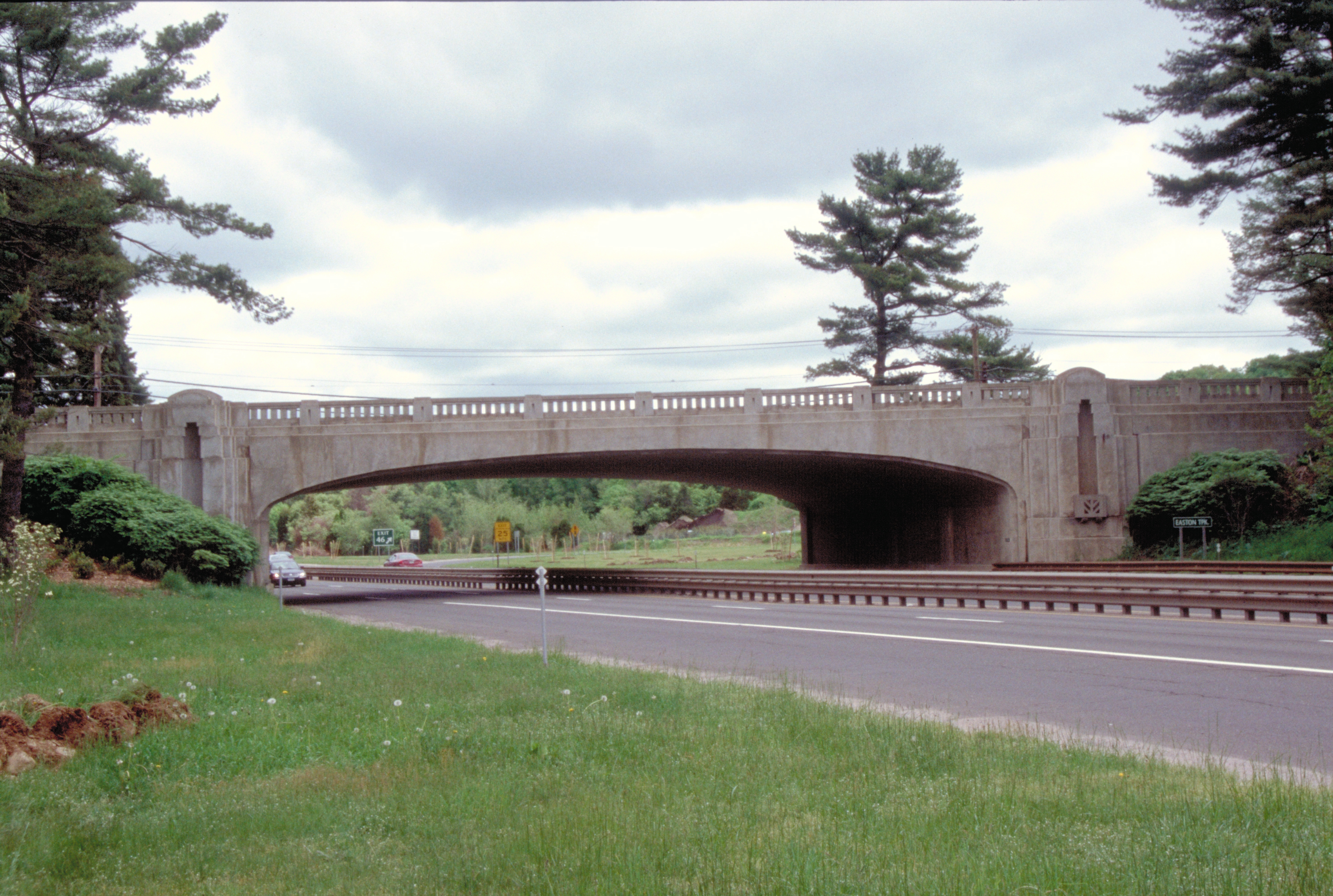
Route 59 (Easton Turnpike) bridge over the Merritt Parkway at exit 46 (now exit 28) in Fairfield

The Merritt is one of a handful of United States highways listed in the National Register of Historic Places. It is acknowledged for the beauty of the forest through which it passes, as well as the architectural design of its overpasses; at the time of its construction, each bridge was decorated in a unique fashion so that no two bridges on the parkway looked alike. Newer overpasses used at exit 16 for U.S. Route 7 (US 7), though, did not maintain this tradition, and as a result, exit 16 on the parkway is now spanned by several ordinary modern bridges constructed using undecorated concrete-on-steel I-beams.

The parkway has two lanes in each direction. Due to its age, it was originally constructed without the merge lanes, long on-ramps, and long off-ramps that are found on modern freeways. Some entrances have perilously short and/or sharp ramps; some entrances even have stop signs, with no merge lane whatsoever; this leads to some dangerous entrances onto the highway. Most have since been modernized, with the interchange of Route 111 in Trumbull featuring Connecticut's first single-point urban interchange (SPUI). The stretch of road between exit 21 in Westport and exit 27 in Fairfield is a very long stretch, roughly 5 1/2 miles (8.9 km) long without a single exit, referred to by local traffic reports as the "No Exit Zone" or "No Man's Land". An exit was planned in the middle of this stretch, but was never built because it would have connected to a northerly extension of the Sherwood Island Connector, which itself was never built to that point.

Vehicles 8 feet (2.4 m) tall or taller in height, weighing 8,000 pounds (3,600 kg) or more, towing a trailer, or having more than four wheels are not allowed on the parkway. Under extenuating circumstances, however, CTDOT may issue permits for oversized vehicles to use the parkway.

== History ==
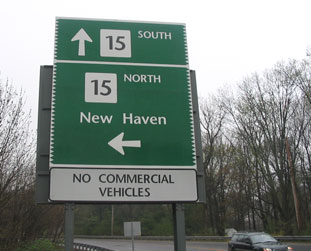
An entrance sign to the Merritt Parkway with the white-on-green and sawtooth border

The Merritt Parkway is one of the oldest scenic parkways in the United States. The portion from Greenwich to Norwalk was opened on June 29, 1938. The section from Norwalk to Trumbull was completed in November 1939, and in 1940, it was finished to the Housatonic River in Stratford. The parkway was named for U.S. Congressman Schuyler Merritt, who was instrumental in enacting legislation allowing the parkway to be built. The Merritt Parkway is the first leg of what later became modern Route 15. Built between 1934 and 1940, the Merritt Parkway runs for 37 miles (60 km) from the New York state line in Greenwich to the Housatonic River in Stratford. It was conceived as a way to alleviate congestion on the Boston Post Road (US 1) in Fairfield County.

After the parkway fully opened in 1940, travelers commonly stopped to picnic along the side of the road. The Merritt Parkway Advisory Commission (later the Merritt Parkway Advisory Committee) decided to ban horses and buggies, bicycles, pedestrians, billboards, and U-turns, while a system of horse trails along the parkway was developed, but later abandoned. To ease objections from county residents, who feared an influx of New Yorkers on their roads, in their towns, on their beaches, and through their forests, highway planners called on engineers, landscape architects, and architects to create a safe and aesthetically pleasing limited-access highway, one with exit and entrance ramps, but no intersections, that would not spoil the countryside. The bridges played a prominent role in the design. Architect George L. Dunkelberger designed them all. They reflected the popularity of the Art Deco style, with touches of neoclassical and modern design. Some of these bridges were constructed by the Works Progress Administration.

In 1948, the road was signed as part of Route 15. Originally, the road had the unsigned designation of Route 1A. Also around this time, exit numbers were posted on the road. In December 1949, a connection to the Wilber Cross Parkway was opened to traffic.

In 1955, exit 30 (not to be confused with the new exit 30), an at-grade intersection with Butternut Hollow Road that crossed traffic in both directions, was permanently closed. It had already been declared a safety hazard.

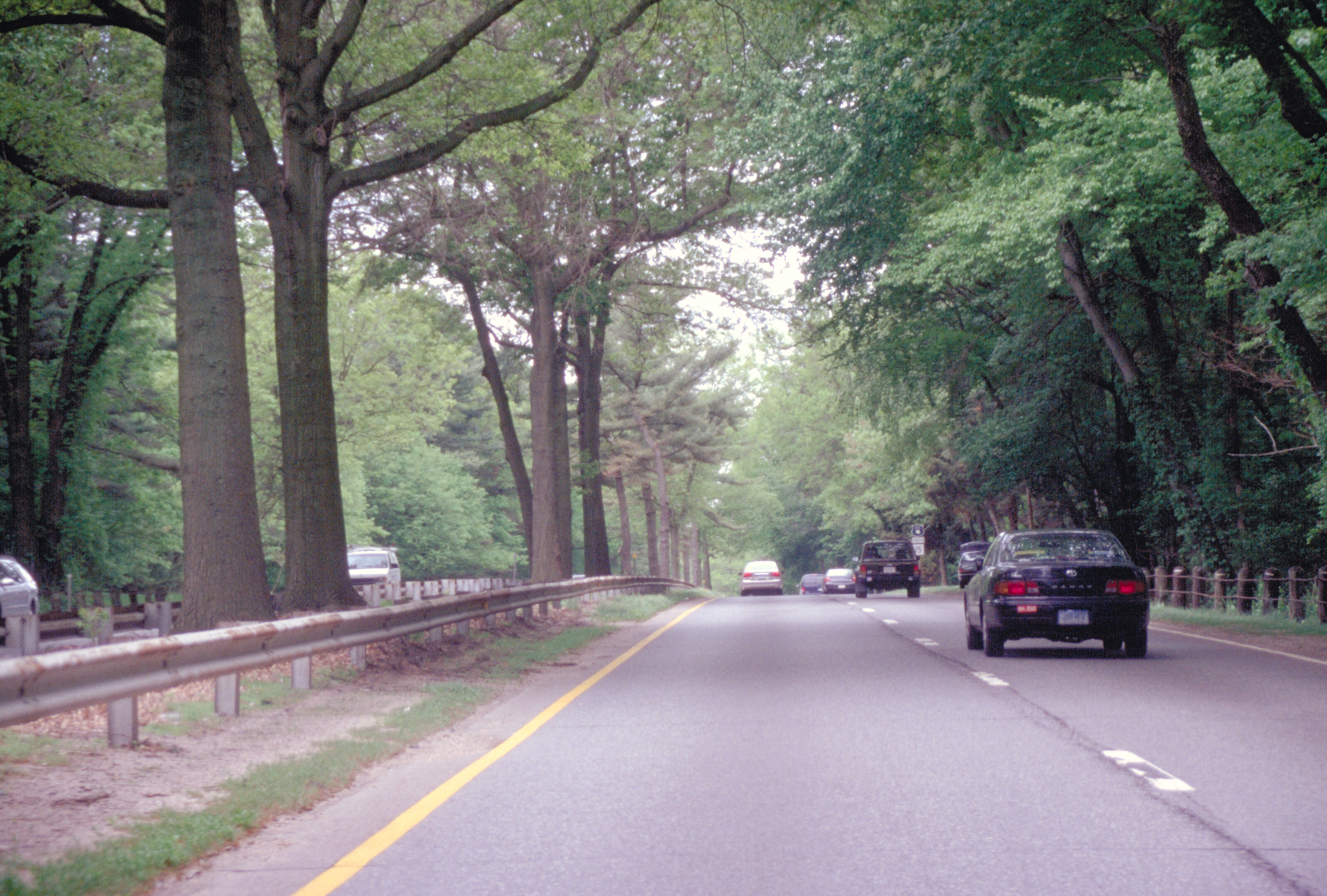
Tree canopy over the Merritt Parkway, and grassy median

In 1957, trees inside the median were cut down for the first time, and a median was installed on a treacherous curve that often got slippery when wet. These followed serious accidents caused by tree related crashes.

The road was initially maintained by the Merritt Parkway Commission, though in 1959, this was absorbed into CTDOT and renamed the Merritt Parkway Committee.

In the late 1960s, the segment of roadway from Stamford to Greenwich was reconstructed in order to make the roadway straighter.

In July 1976, the toll at the Greenwich Toll Plaza was increased from a nickel to 25 cents.

In the late 1970s, a project to replace the Huntington Turnpike exit as well as the original Route 8 exit with new ramps was undertaken. The old ramps were demolished by 1979; the new exits opened in 1983.

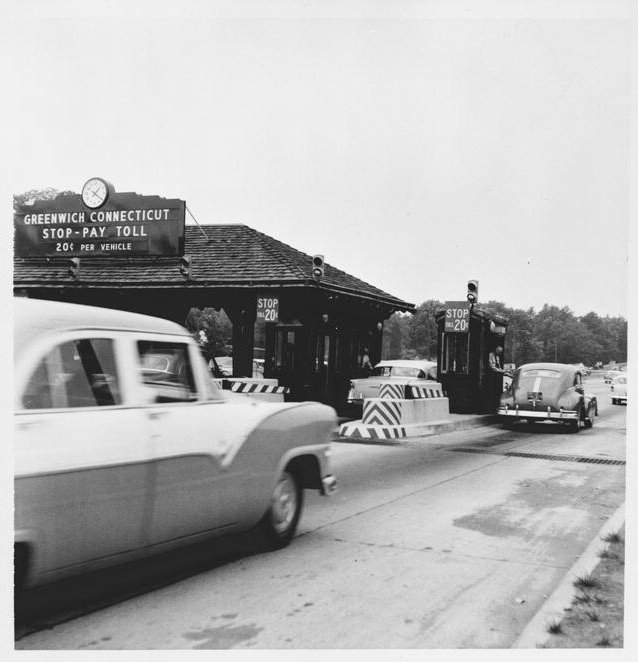
Toll booth in 1955

Tolls were eliminated at the Greenwich Toll Plaza on June 27, 1988, as part of a mandate that abolished tolls on all of Connecticut's roads. The toll plaza is preserved in Stratford's Boothe Memorial Park near exit 36, complete with still-flashing lights over each toll lane.

In 1992, a new interchange with US 7 was opened, which involved rebuilding another portion of roadway.

In 1999, a project to reconstruct exit 27 (old exit 44) and eliminate exit 45 was completed at the cost of $4.6 million. In addition, exit 36 (old exit 53) was reconstructed into a standard diamond interchange; it was originally a seven ramp configuration.

In April 2001, a complete reissuance of the parkway's signs was carried out, instituting a uniform white-on-green color scheme and a sawtooth border.

In 2004, a project to rebuild exit 30 from a standard diamond interchange into a single-point urban interchange (SPUI) was completed. Also as part of this project, a new overpass was built to replace the old one (it was not wide enough for a SPUI), though this new overpass replicated the aesthetics of the old one.

After years of environmental studies, CTDOT awarded an $87 million contract to Balfour Beatty Construction to build the replacement Igor I. Sikorsky Memorial Bridge in 2000. The southern half of the replacement bridge opened in 2003; the old bridge was demolished in 2004. In February 2004, the load unexpectedly shifted on a crane that was removing structural steel from the old bridge. The crane overturned and fell into the partially frozen Housatonic River, killing its operator. The remaining half of the bridge was completed in 2006, two years behind schedule. The new bridge has a concrete deck, with an asphalt surface, three lanes in each direction, full left and right shoulders, a sidewalk for pedestrians, wrought-iron railing, and aesthetic lighting. The bridge also includes a system of concrete fenders that protects the bridge piers from ship collisions, a feature that was absent from the original span.

Exits were originally numbered sequentially, not mileage-based, like most highways in Connecticut. However, the state is gradually transitioning to milepost-based exit numbers on most of its highways over the next few years. The Merritt Parkway's (and all of Route 15) transition from sequential exit numbers to mileage-based exit numbers was completed in 2025.

== Service plazas ==
Six rest areas/service plazas, featuring parking lots, gas stations, and convenience stores, were also built along the Merritt Parkway so that drivers would not have to exit to refuel. Pairs of plazas are located opposite each other on either side of the parkway in Fairfield (near exit 28), New Canaan (near exit 14), and Greenwich (just beyond the CT-NY state line). The northbound-side plaza in Greenwich also houses a Connecticut welcome center. The plazas were originally constructed during the parkway's days as a tolled highway, but remained even after the tolls were removed in 1988, making the parkway one of only a few toll-free highways with service plazas along its length. Between 2011 and 2015, all six of the service plazas (along with the four located further north along the Wilbur Cross Parkway) were completely renovated. The renovations preserved the original brick-and-stone façade of the buildings, but completely redesigned and modernized the interiors. The plazas now include more modern gas pumps, Alltown convenience stores, and a Dunkin' Donuts shop at each location; three of the Merritt's six plazas also include a Subway shop. Prior to the renovations, no fast-food service had previously been available at the plazas. The renovation project was completed during the summer of 2015, when the New Canaan plazas were reopened.

In 2013, electric-vehicle (EV) charging stations for Tesla automobiles were added to both the northbound and southbound Greenwich service plazas, with four Superchargers installed in each direction. In addition, charging for CHAdeMO-equipped EVs was added to the northbound Greenwich service plaza. The parking/charging stalls are some of the first in the U.S. to be designated "shared use"—EVs may use the stall for up to 45 minutes to charge, or internal-combustion engine vehicles may park for up to 15 minutes.

== Safety ==
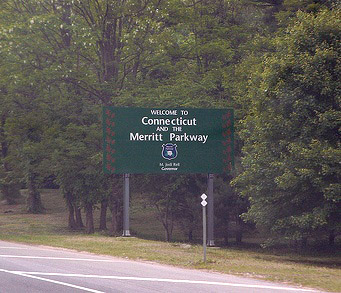
Welcome sign on the northbound side in Greenwich near exit 19B on the NY-CT state border.

One of the Merritt's aesthetic features is also a potential danger to its drivers. Trees that line either side of the parkway, and often in the center median, grow branches that cover the roadway, and occasionally fall during severe weather, or with natural aging. Stretches of the parkway also lack guardrails on the right shoulders, creating a risk of tree-impact accidents if cars veer off the pavement.

In 2007, after complaints were voiced about the danger of the trees along the parkway, state officials announced they would trim and eliminate some of them more aggressively. A large, seemingly healthy tree fell on a car near exit 21 in Westport in June 2007, killing a couple from Pelham, New York. On June 23, 2011, a driver was killed in Stamford when a tree fell onto his car.

A state study of fatalities on Connecticut highways showed that from 1985 to 1992, about 10 people died every three years in tree-related accidents, although no other state roadway averaged more than one in three years.

CTDOT commonly sends out work crews twice a year to drive along both sides of the parkway at 5 miles per hour (8.0 km/h) in search of decrepit trees. Trees that had been scheduled to be cut down in five to 10 years would be removed sooner. Some more trees also would be removed, as the shoulder of the parkway is being widened to 8 feet (2.4 m) to give drivers room to pull over.

Following the 2007 and 2011 incidents, the state became more aggressive in closing the parkway in times of severe weather. The parkway was closed during Tropical Storm Irene and the Halloween nor'easter in 2011, and Hurricane Sandy in 2012. With each of those storms, many trees and limbs fell across the parkway. After Sandy, the state began a large effort to remove unhealthy trees, and in the process created much wider clearances between the roadside and forest.

In addition to numerous trees along the Parkway, interchanges were originally designed with Right-in/right-out (RIRO) ramps with no acceleration or deceleration lanes. Crashes were common at Parkway onramps, as vehicles entering the Parkway would have to stop at the top of the ramp and wait for a break in traffic, then rapidly accelerate to meet highway speeds on the heavily-traveled roadway. The Connecticut Department of Transportation (CTDOT) has made progress in improving safety at interchanges by revising ramp configurations and adding acceleration/deceleration lanes, although a few of the original RIRO interchanges remain.

The Merritt Parkway Advisory Committee meets quarterly.

== Exit list ==
Exit numbers on the Merritt Parkway originally continued from the original sequential exits of the Hutchinson River Parkway, which ended at 27.

The Hutchinson River Parkway switched to a mileage-based system in 2021, and New York State's exit numbers endied at 19A. King Street (NY 120A), which travels along the state border, is served by exit 19B (formerly exit 27) on the Merritt Parkway and exit 19A on the Hutchinson River Parkway. Because additional interchanges had been added on the New York side, exit 19A on the Hutchinson River Parkway was numbered as exit 30.

CTDOT completed the transition from sequential exit numbers to mileage-based exit numbers on the Merritt Parkway in 2025.

County	Location	mi	km	Old exit	New exit	Destinations	Notes
Fairfield	Greenwich	0.00	0.00	—	–	Hutchinson River Parkway south – New York City Route 15 begins	Continuation into New York; southern terminus of Route 15
Fairfield	Greenwich	0.05	0.080	27	19B	NY 120A north (King Street) – Armonk, NY	Access to NY 120A south via Hutchinson Parkway exit 19A; Armonk not signed northbound; exit number corresponds to Hutchinson Parkway
Fairfield	Greenwich	3.39	5.46	28	3	Round Hill Road	To Greenwich Business District
Fairfield	Greenwich	4.16	6.69	29	4	Lake Avenue	
Fairfield	Greenwich			30	—	Butternut Hollow Road	Intersection closed 1955
Fairfield	Greenwich	5.71	9.19	31	5	North Street	To Greenwich Business District
Fairfield	Stamford	8.89	14.31	33	8	Den Road	Right-in/right-out connections only
Fairfield	Stamford	9.22	14.84	34	9	Route 104 (Long Ridge Road)	To Downtown Stamford and University of Connecticut Stamford Campus
Fairfield	Stamford	10.40	16.74	35	10	Route 137 (High Ridge Road)	
Fairfield	New Canaan	13.15	21.16	36	13	Route 106 (Old Stamford Road)	
Fairfield	New Canaan	13.89– 14.10	22.35– 22.69	37	14	Route 124 – New Canaan, Darien	
Fairfield	Norwalk	16.01	25.77	38	16	Route 123 (New Canaan Avenue)	To Norwalk Community College
Fairfield	Norwalk	16.87– 17.31	27.15– 27.86	39	16-17A	US 7 – Norwalk, Danbury	Northbound exit and southbound entrance; signed as exits 16 (US 7 south) and 17A (US 7 north); exit 3 on US 7; redesign in proposal stage
Fairfield	Norwalk	17.53– 17.63	28.21– 28.37	40	17	Main Avenue (SR 719) to US 7 – Norwalk, Danbury	Signed as exits 17A (US 7 south) and 17B (US 7 north) southbound, exits 17B (Main Avenue south) and 17C (Main Avenue north) northbound; signed for US 7 southbound, Main Avenue northbound
Fairfield	Westport	20.73	33.36	41	20	Route 33 – Westport, Wilton	
Fairfield	Westport	21.59	34.75	42	21	Route 57 (Route 136) – Westport, Weston	Route 136 not signed
Fairfield	Fairfield	26.95	43.37	44	27	Route 58 – Fairfield, Redding	To Fairfield Business District and Fairfield University
Fairfield	Fairfield	28.58	46.00	46	28	Route 59 – Fairfield, Easton	To West Campus of Sacred Heart University; access via SR 713/SR 726
Fairfield	Trumbull	29.31	47.17	47	29	Park Avenue	To University of Bridgeport and Sacred Heart University
Fairfield	Trumbull	30.37	48.88	48	30	Route 111 (Main Street)	Southern terminus of Route 111; single-point urban interchange
Fairfield	Trumbull	31.64– 32.69	50.92– 52.61	49	32A	Route 25 – Bridgeport, Danbury	No southbound access to Route 25 south; signed as exits 31 (Route 25 south) 32 (Route 25 north) northbound; exit 5 on Route 25
Fairfield	Trumbull	32.99	53.09	50	32B	Route 127 – Trumbull	Southbound exit and northbound entrance
Fairfield	Trumbull	33.51	53.93	51	33	Route 108 (Nichols Avenue)	Northbound exit and southbound entrance
Fairfield	Trumbull	33.77– 34.57	54.35– 55.64	52	34	Route 8 / Route 108 – Bridgeport, Waterbury	No northbound access to Route 8 south/Route 108; exits 5 and 6 on Route 8
Fairfield	Stratford	36.54	58.81	53	36	Route 110 – Stratford, Shelton	
Housatonic River		37.53	60.40	Igor I. Sikorsky Memorial Bridge			
New Haven	Milford	37.67	60.62	54	37	To I-95 / US 1 – Milford, New London	Access via Milford Parkway and exits 3A and 3B on Milford Parkway north
New Haven	Milford	37.67	60.62	–	–	Route 15 north (Wilbur Cross Parkway) – Hartford	Continuation north; northern end of Route 15 concurrency
1.000 mi = 1.609 km; 1.000 km = 0.621 mi: Concurrency terminus; Incomplete access

== In popular culture ==
- The Willem de Kooning oil-on-canvas painting Merritt Parkway (1959) is owned by the Detroit Institute of Arts.
- Lisa Seidenberg, a filmmaker from Westport, produced a documentary film, The Road Taken...The Merritt Parkway (2008).
- Dick Dodge depicted the Merritt Parkway as a Christmas tree on the December 1955 issue of Ford Times ("Christmas Tree Highway"), with the parkway in single-point perspective appearing as the tree decorated by the steady stream of headlights (white) and tail lights (red).

=== Images ===
Map (western segment)

Map (eastern segment)

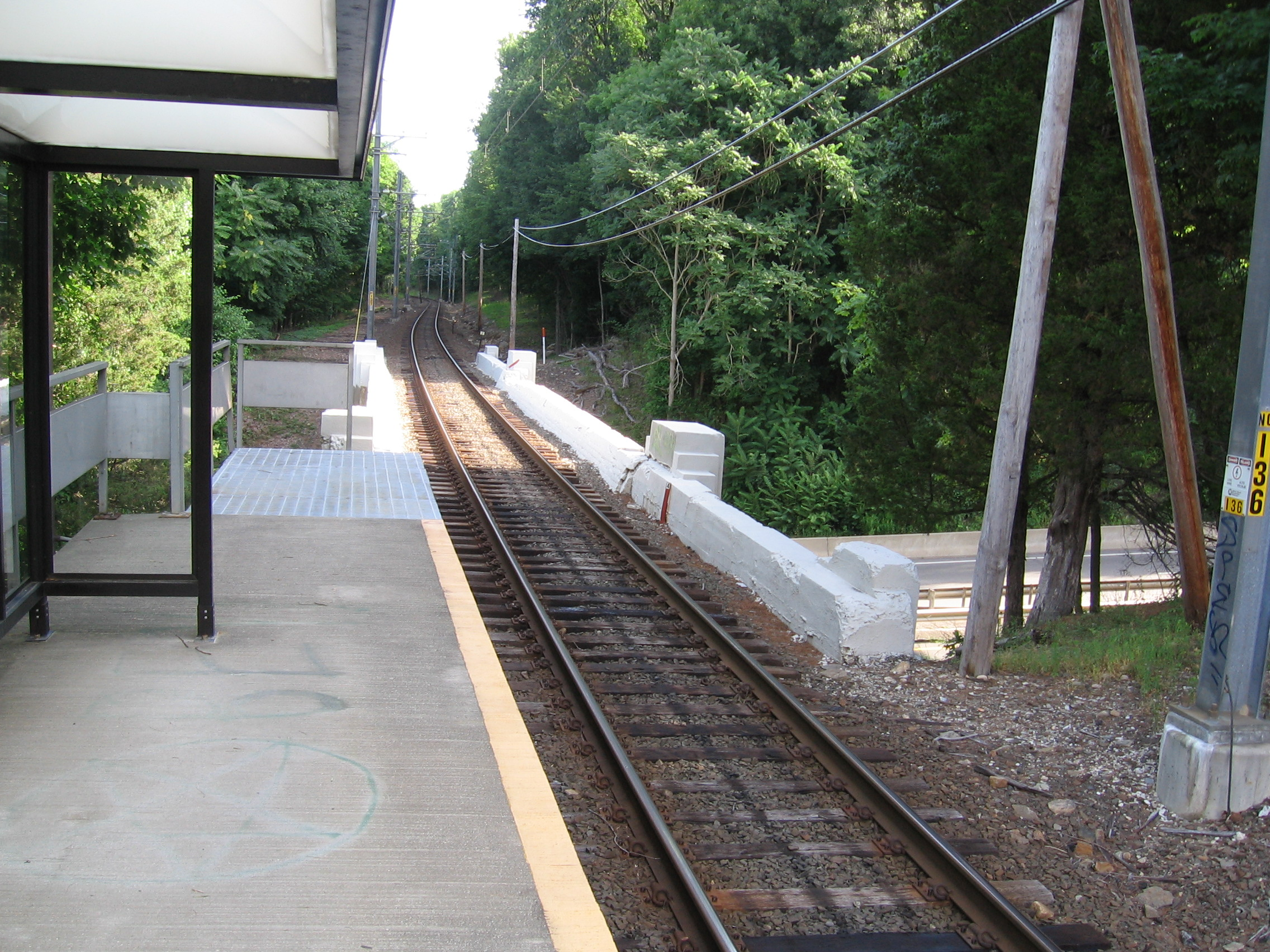
Talmadge Hill Metro-North station over the Merritt in New Canaan

== See also ==
- Merritt Parkway Bridges
- National Register of Historic Places listings in Fairfield County, Connecticut
