= Hope Haynes =

History

United States
- Name: Hope Haynes
- Builder: Wiscasset, Maine
- Launched: 1880
- Renamed: Mystic (1916)

General characteristics
- Class & type: Schooner
- Tonnage: 216 GRT
- Length: 108 feet (33 m)
- Beam: 30 feet (9.1 m)
- Draft: 10 feet (3.0 m)
- Sail plan: Three-masted

The Hope Haynes was a ship notable for causing a massive fire and gas explosion in Bridgeport, Connecticut, in 1905.

== Ship information ==
The schooner Hope Haynes was a wooden three masted type, home ported in Bath, Maine. Built in 1880, it weighed 216 gross tons, was 108 feet (33 m) long, 30 feet (9.1 m) wide, 10 feet (3.0 m) in depth and was constructed in Wiscasset, Maine.

== 1905 Bridgeport incident ==
On 30 July 1905, the Pequonnock River flooded from a massive storm which dumped over 11 inches (28 cm) of rain in one day and also burst several reservoirs north of the city. The Hope Haynes was torn from her moorings and smashed into the Congress Street Bridge, tearing out electrical wiring and thus setting a fire which spread to and ignited a broken gas main. There was a large explosion and the ship also caught on fire, but was soon put out.

== Later service ==
The ship was rebuilt in 1908 in Mystic, Connecticut, and was renamed Mystic in 1916 when it was sold for $12,000 to a Captain Mueller for use as a cargo ship to Cape de Verde.
