= Connecticut Route 113 =

State highway in Fairfield County, Connecticut, US

Route 113
- Map of Fairfield County in southwestern Connecticut with Route 113 highlighted in red

Route information
- Maintained by CTDOT
- Length: 8.12 mi (13.07 km)
- Existed: 1932–present

Major junctions
- South end: I-95 at the Bridgeport–Stratford Town line
- US 1 in Stratford
- North end: Route 110 in Straford

Location
- Country: United States
- State: Connecticut
- Counties: Fairfield

Highway system
- Connecticut State Highway System; Interstate; US; State; SSR; SR; Scenic
← Route 112	→ Route 114

Route 113 is a Connecticut state highway running from the Bridgeport–Stratford Town line around the Lordship section of Stratford to the eastern part of the town.

== Route description ==
Route 113 begins at an intersection with Interstate 95 (I-95) at the Bridgeport–Stratford town line and heads east into Stratford as Lordship Boulevard. It then heads southeast along the western boundary of Sikorsky Memorial Airport, then turns east, still encircling the airport, along Oak Bluff Avenue and Prospect Drive. The transition between Oak Bluff Avenue and Prospect Drive is a roundabout intersection. Route 113 then heads north around Stratford Point as Stratford Road and Main Street, along the mouth of the Housatonic River at Long Island Sound. The road also provides access to Short Beach Park, a town beach. Main Street continues north towards Stratford center, intersecting with Route 130 and West Broad Street (which provides access to I-95 at exit 32B). Continuing north, it goes under I-95 without an interchange past the Stratford railroad station, intersecting with U.S. Route 1 (US 1), then running for another 1.6 miles (2.6 km) in the residential part of town before ending at Route 110 (East Main Street). Main Street continues straight as Route 110.

== History ==
Route 113 was created in 1932, originally running from Stratford Point to downtown Stratford and then to Shelton along the current route of Route 108. In about 1940, it was extended west along the current route into Bridgeport. In 1944, it was rerouted to the north of Sikorsky Airport (along Access Road), with the southerly alignment becoming Route 113A, but was returned to its current route in 1947 (Route 113A was deleted). In 1952, it was extended north to the Shelton town center via the Huntington Turnpike. In 1963, Route 108 was extended south along Nichols Avenue and Route 113 was rerouted east to its current route, over a former section of Route 110. This northernmost portion of current Route 113 was the original southern end of Route 8 prior to the construction of the expressway.

== Major intersections ==
The entire route is in Fairfield County.

Location	mi	km	Destinations	Notes
Bridgeport–Stratford line	0.00	0.00	I-95 south – New York City	Southern terminus
Bridgeport–Stratford line	0.25	0.40	I-95 north – New Haven	Access via Surf Avenue; exit 31 on I-95
Stratford	5.61	9.03	Route 130 – Bridgeport, New Haven	
Stratford	6.48	10.43	US 1 (Barnum Avenue)	Former Boston Post Road
Stratford	8.12	13.07	Route 110 – Shelton	Northern terminus
1.000 mi = 1.609 km; 1.000 km = 0.621 mi
