= Connecticut Route 152 =

State highway in New Haven County, Connecticut, US

Route 152
- Map of New Haven County in southern Connecticut with Route 152 highlighted in red

Route information
- Maintained by CTDOT
- Length: 3.31 mi (5.33 km)
- Existed: 1932–present

Major junctions
- South end: US 1 in Orange
- North end: Route 34 in Orange

Location
- Country: United States
- State: Connecticut
- Counties: New Haven

Highway system
- Connecticut State Highway System; Interstate; US; State; SSR; SR; Scenic
← Route 151	→ Route 153

Route 152 is a state highway in Connecticut running entirely within the town of Orange. It serves to connect the town center with U.S. Route 1 (US 1) and Route 34.

== Route description ==
Route 152 begins at an intersection with US 1 (Boston Post Road) in Orange and heads generally north. It passes by the town center where the town hall, congregational church, and library are located about halfway along its journey. About 0.4 miles (0.64 km) north of the town center, it intersects with Old Grassy Hill Road, which is signed as a shortcut for the Wilbur Cross Parkway (Route 15). The road then curves to the right at a five-way intersection controlled by an all-way stop. After crossing Race Brook, Route 152 intersects with Lambert Road, which is a parallel route leading straight to Interstate 95 (I-95) several miles to the south. Route 152 ends 0.4 miles (0.64 km) later at an intersection with Route 34 (Derby Turnpike). The road continues across Route 34 as a local road that connects with Route 114 in northern Orange. The entire length of Route 152 is known as Orange Center Road. Route 152 is a minor arterial road and carries average daily traffic volumes of up to 11,400 between Old Grassy Hill Road and the town center.

== History ==
In the 1920s, the road between Route 34 and Route 1 through Orange center was a secondary state highway known as Highway 322. It differed slightly from modern Route 152 on its north end. Old Highway 322 instead used Mapledale Road (one of the branches of the five-way intersection) to reach Route 34. Route 152 was created in the 1932 state highway renumbering from old Highway 322. The northern end was shifted to its modern alignment in 1972.

== Junction list ==
The entire route is in Orange, New Haven County.

mi	km	Destinations	Notes
0.00	0.00	US 1 – Milford, New Haven	Southern terminus
3.31	5.33	Route 34 – Derby, New Haven	Northern terminus
1.000 mi = 1.609 km; 1.000 km = 0.621 mi
