= Long Hill, Trumbull, Connecticut =

Place in Connecticut, United States

Long Hill, Connecticut
- Census-designated place
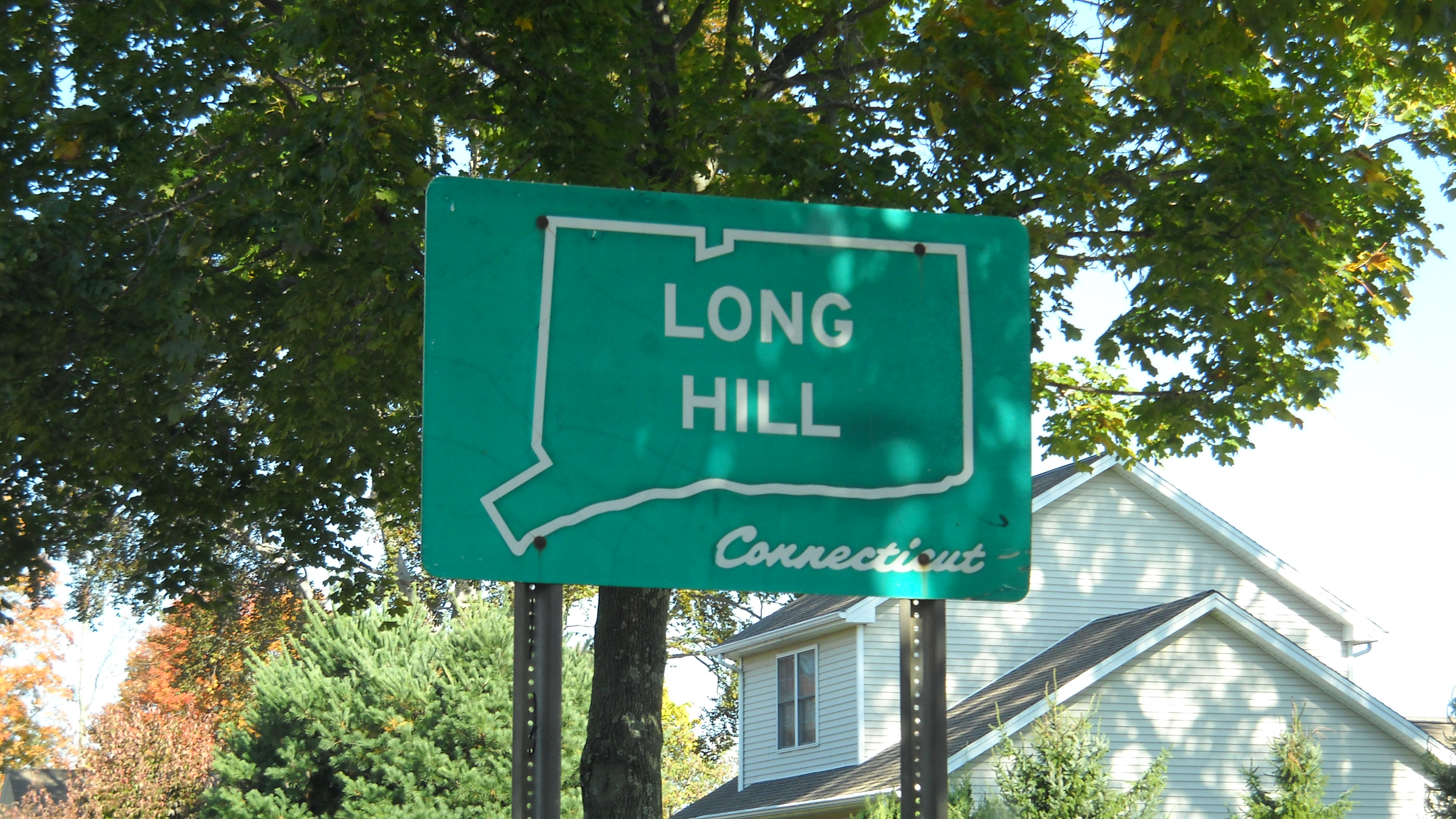
- Long Hill marker

- Location within Connecticut Location within the United States
- Coordinates: 41°16′39″N 73°13′39″W
- Country: United States
- State: Connecticut
- County: Fairfield
- Town: Trumbull

Area
  - Total: 3.24 sq mi (8.38 km^{2})
  - Land: 3.24 sq mi (8.38 km^{2})
  - Water: 0 sq mi (0.0 km^{2})
- Elevation: 375 ft (114 m)
- Time zone: UTC-5 (Eastern (EST))
  - Summer (DST): UTC-4 (EDT)
- ZIP Code: 06611 (Trumbull)
- Area codes: 203/475
- FIPS code: 09-43580
- GNIS feature ID: 2805071

Long Hill is a neighborhood and census-designated place (CDP) in the town of Trumbull in Fairfield County, Connecticut, United States. It is located west of the Pequonnock River. The main thoroughfare is (Route 111), present-day Main Street. It was listed as a census-designated place prior to the 2020 census.

== History ==
Long Hill was originally and entirely settled as a part of Stratford, Connecticut, settled in 1639. By the mid-1650s, the Golden Hill Paugussett Indian Nation began to petition the Court of the Colony of Connecticut for compensation for lost territory taken by the encroaching English settlement at Stratford. This legal action led the court to set the town boundary on May 15, 1656, to include all of the territory 12 miles (19 km) inland from Long Island Sound between the Housatonic River and the Fairfield town line, including all of Long Hill.

The English continued to purchase territory from the Native Americans, entering the deeds of transfer into the land records. In April 1662, Lt. Joseph Judson, Joseph Hawley, and John Minor secured the last written deed of transfer from the Paugussett Indian Nation for the entire western part of Trumbull, referred to simply as the "Long Hill purchase" lying west of land already purchased. Land on Long Hill was granted to individuals shortly after 1662.

In May 1740, upon the petition of Jonathan Edwards, the farmers at Stratfield's winter parish on Long Hill were granted their own individual village and parish and received funds for education by an act of the legislature. In 1744, the Unity Parish and the Long Hill parish of the Stratfield section of Stratford asked permission to combine and become the "Society of North Stratford". North Stratford remained as a village under the control of the town of Stratford for a period of 53 years until it became a part of the town of Trumbull when it incorporated in 1797.

== 1720 Green ==
The Long Hill Green is the triangle of land created by the intersection of roads leading down to where mills were built on the Pequonnock River in the 1700s and the main road that connected the Stratfield section of Stratford, now Bridgeport, with Newtown. The present-day roads are Main Street (Route 111), Broadway Road and Whitney Avenue. North Farrars Brook, a tributary of the Pequonnock River, flows on the north side of the green. The green was enlarged to its present size in 1801, when the Bridgeport and Newtown Turnpike Company shifted the road west, to straighten out the route.

== Public education ==
The spirit of public education was fostered early in Long Hill when the Stratford selectmen voted on January 11, 1716, to allow the farmers settled there use of the "forty shillings per thousand allowed by law for seven years ensuing, provided they educate their children according to law."

The first Long Hill school district was formed in November 1761. The district had its own committee, which was appointed regularly and consisted of three persons. In 1762, Long Hill was split into two districts, Upper Long Hill and Lower Long Hill. Lower Long Hill School closed in 1920.

On December 2, 1795, the school district set new boundaries, Long Hill South and Long Hill North. The physical description of the new districts listed landmark houses, roads and geographical locations in the boundary descriptions that included Canoe Brook, Daniel Salmon's, Mr. Seeley Burrough's, Mr. Benjamin Beardslee's, the Weston and Stratfield Parish town lines as well as Mr. Enoch Gregory's, Mr. John Jones, Mr. John Fitch and the Newtown Road, present-day Main Street (Route 111).

== Main Street ==
The road from Long Hill to Stevenson was chartered as a turnpike in May 1826 and was formally known as the "Monroe and Zoar Bridge Turnpike". At that time, the road from Bridgeport to Trumbull was already a toll road known as the Bridgeport and Newtown Turnpike, connecting its namesake towns, and had been in operation since 1801.

In 1922, the former Monroe and Zoar Bridge Turnpike (more commonly known as simply the Monroe Turnpike) became part of the Connecticut state highway system. It was given the designation State Highway 308 and ran from modern (Route 25) to modern (Route 34). The continuation into Bridgeport, which would later become Route 25, was at the time part of State Highway 122.

Modern (Route 111) (Main Street) was created in the 1932 state highway renumbering from old State Highway 308 and was previously called Long Hill Street. In 1982, with the opening of the Route 25 freeway, the former southern section of Route 25 within Trumbull was reassigned to Route 111, while the portion in Bridgeport reverted to the town.

== Industry ==
The Hubbell Hadley shirt factory was at one time a significant employer.

== Post office ==
The Long Hill Post office was active since at least the 1860s.

== Emergency services ==
Long Hill is served by the Trumbull Police Department and EMS, but does have three firehouses. Long Hill Fire Company #1 was formed in January 1921 and was officially recognized by the state on March 8, 1921.

== Notable location ==
- Old Mine Park Archeological Site, a historic mine

== Notable people ==
- Harvey Hubbell (1857–1927), inventor
- Igor Sikorsky (1889–1972), aviation pioneer and helicopter inventor

== Images ==
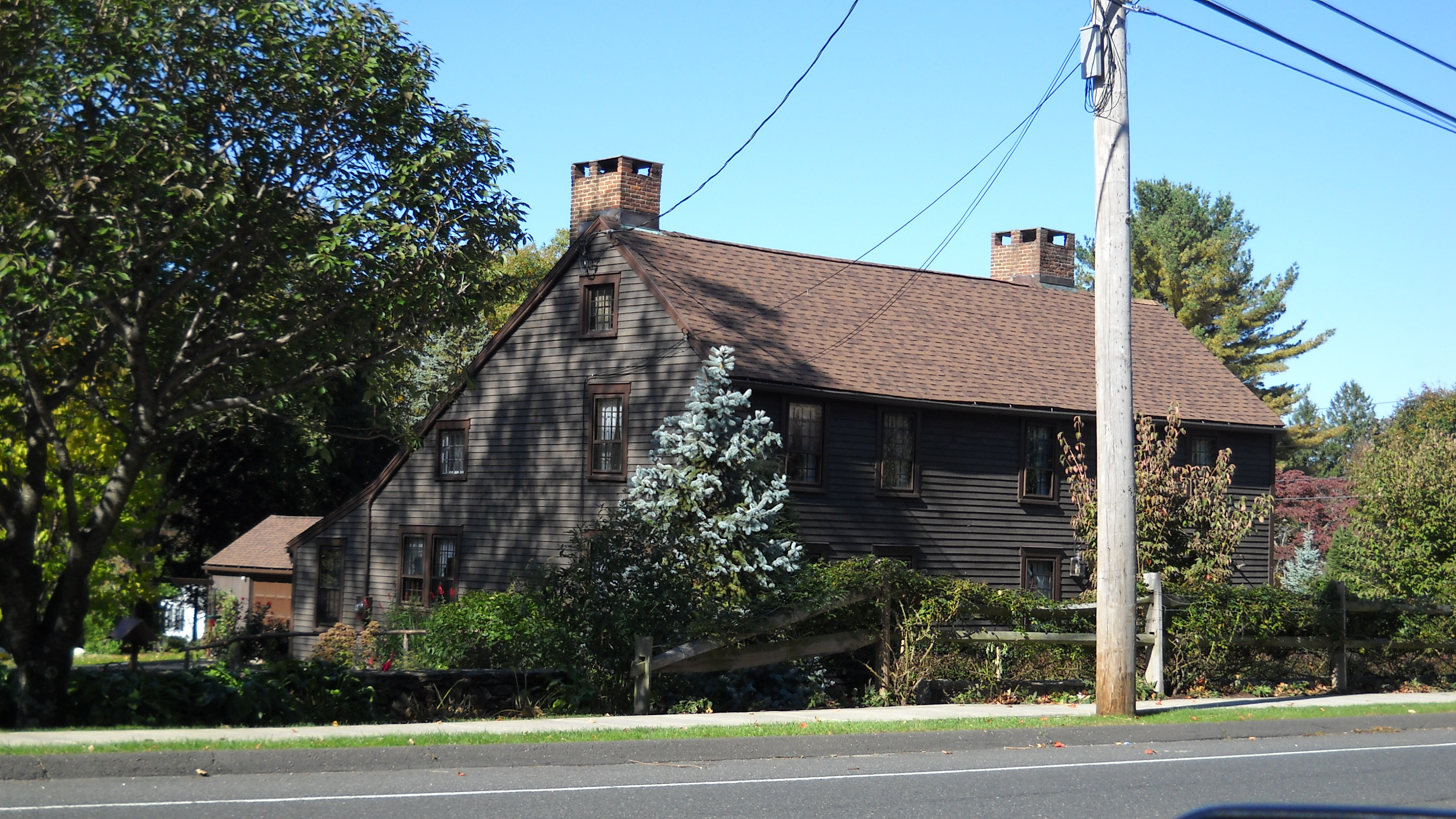
John Wildman House c. 1682–1745

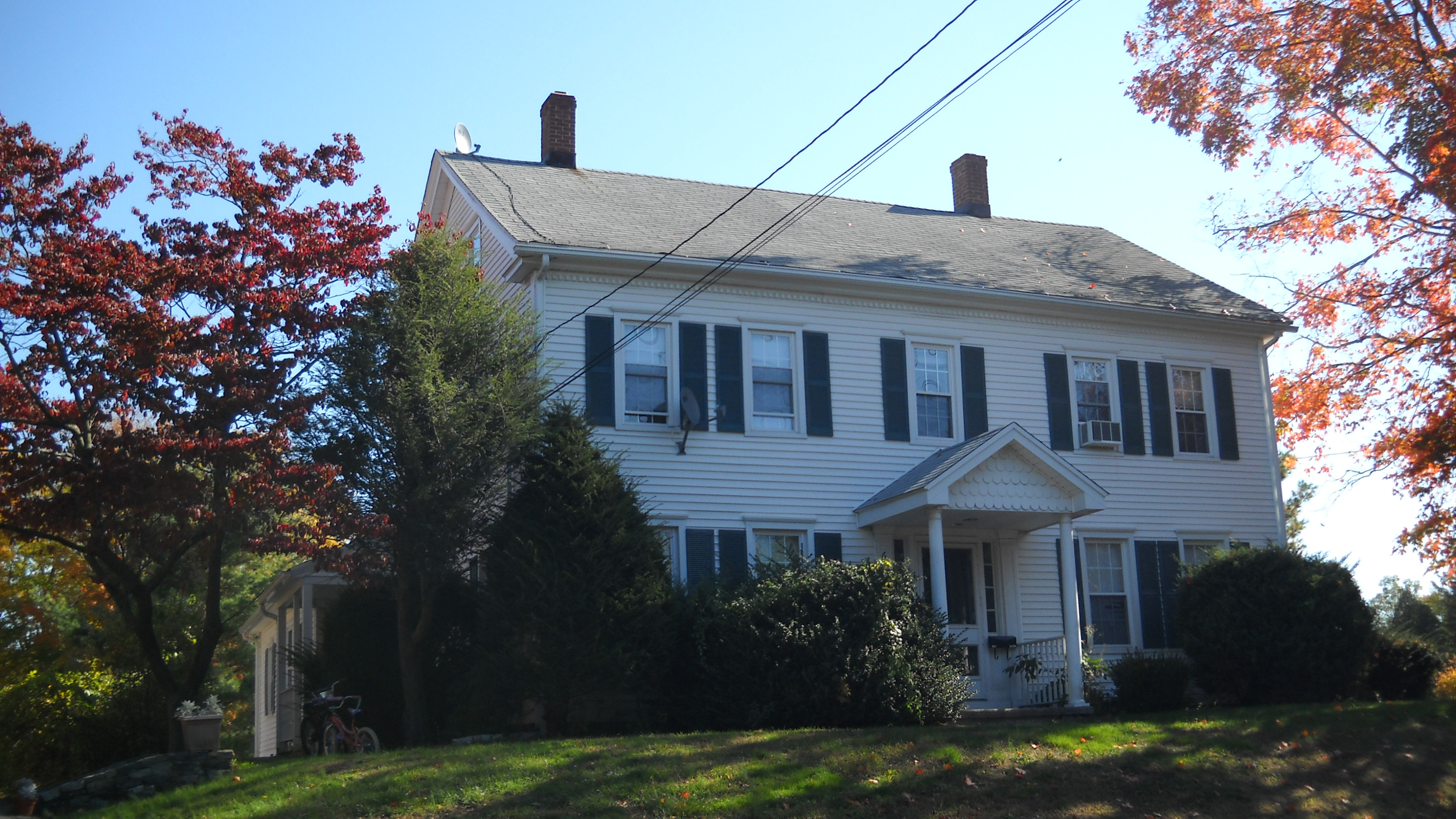
Captain Beardsley House c. 1756

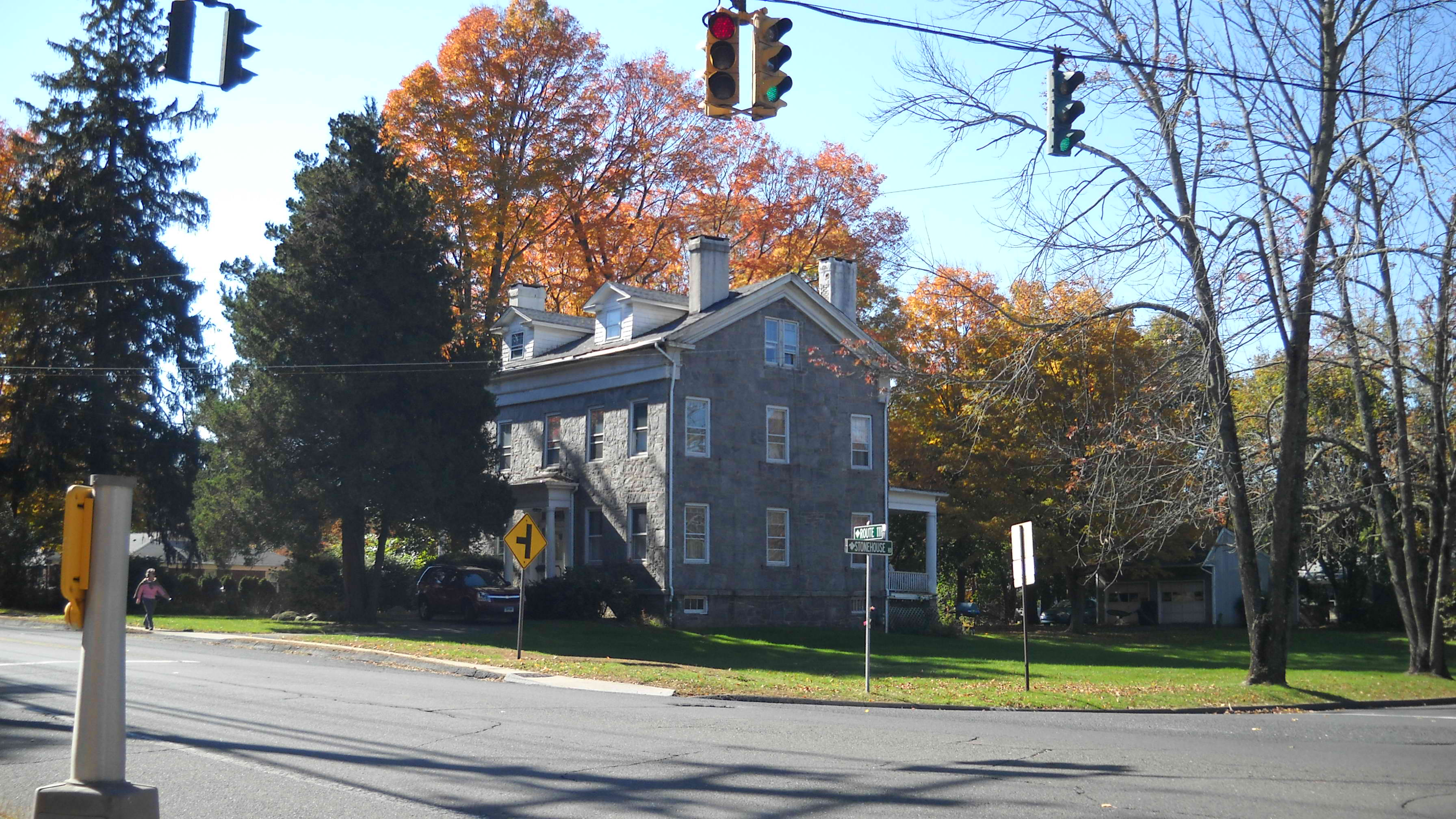
Beardsley-Morrissey House c. 1800

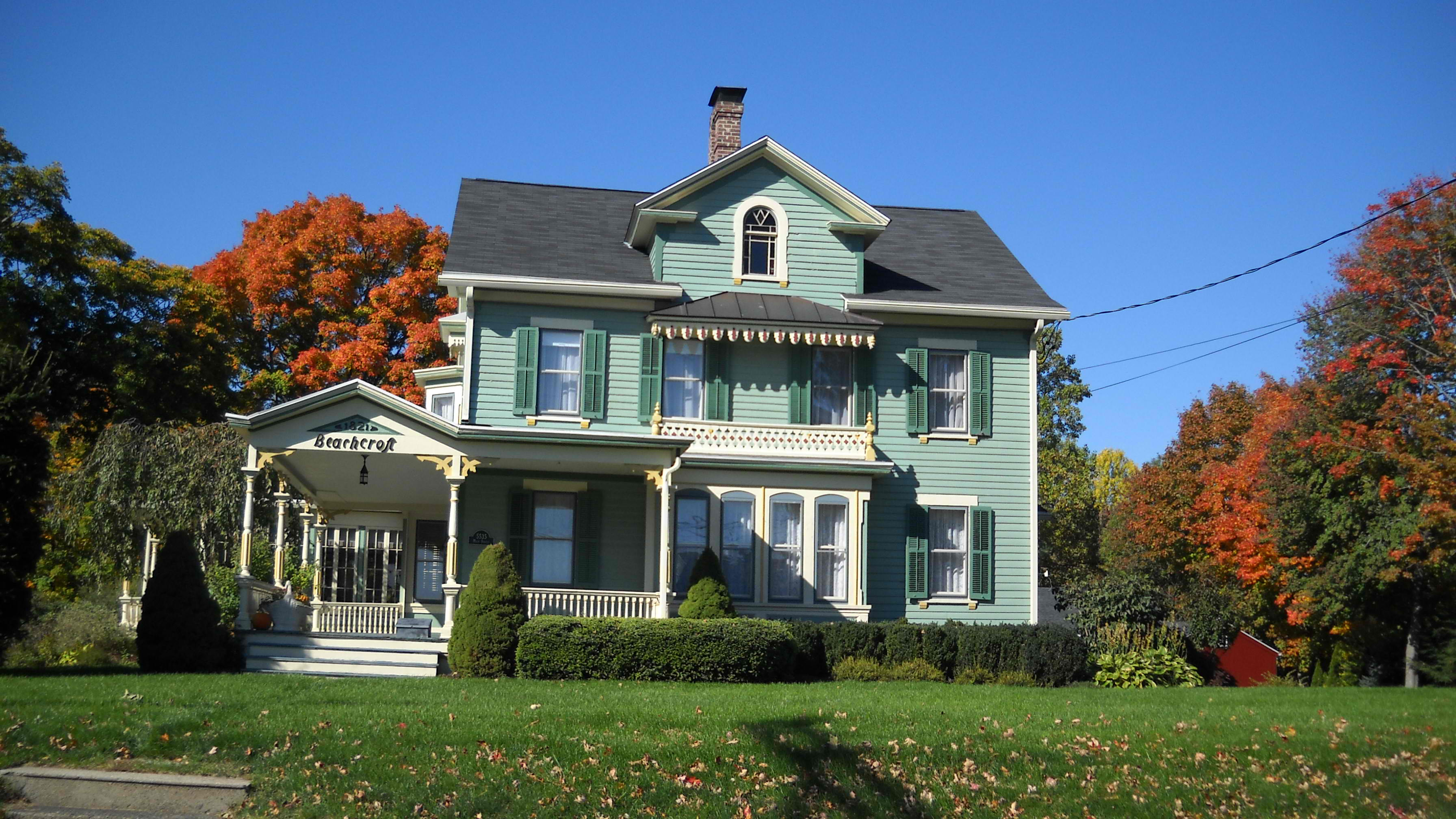
Beachcroft c. 1821

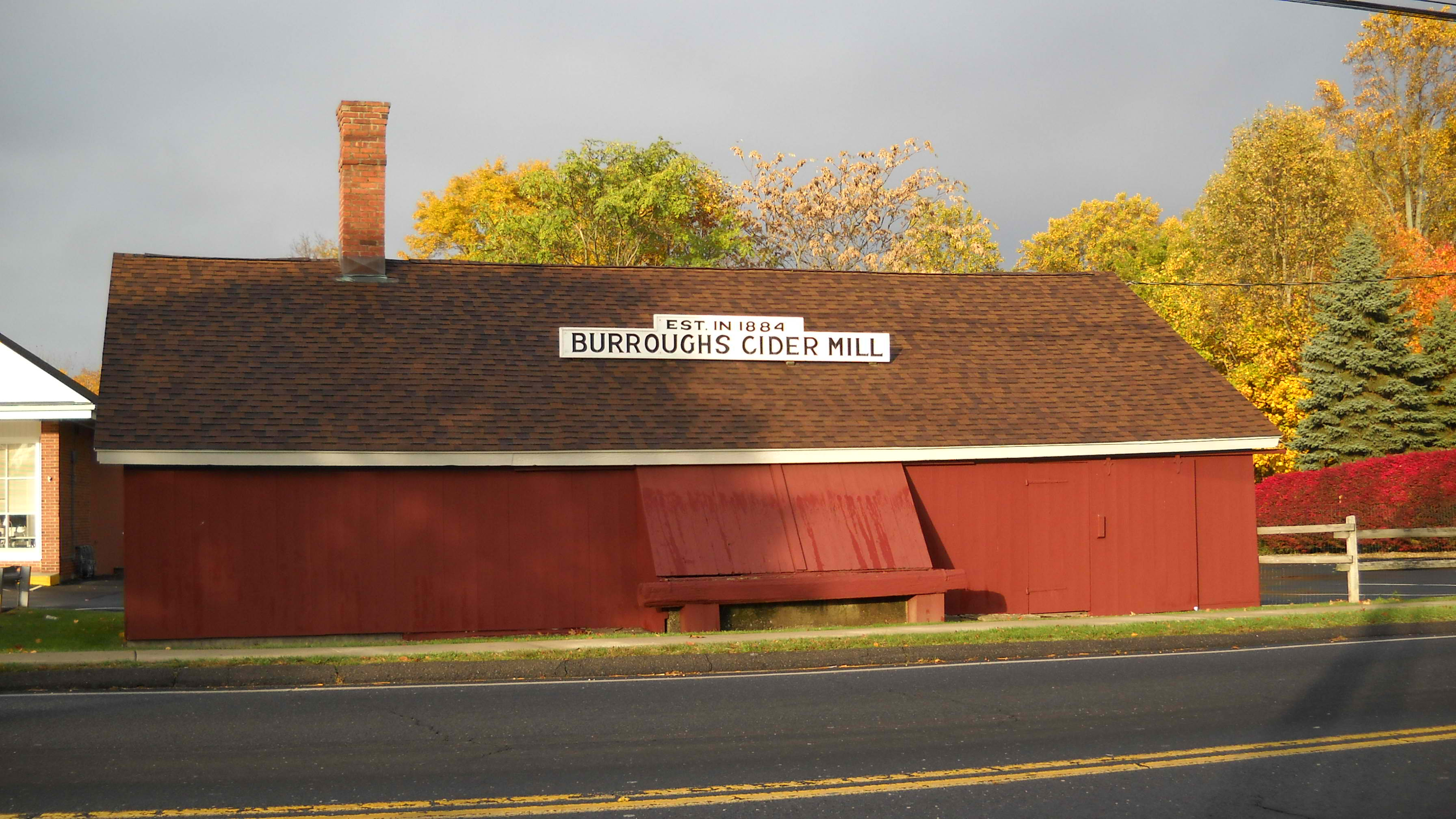
Burroughs Cider Mill c. 1884

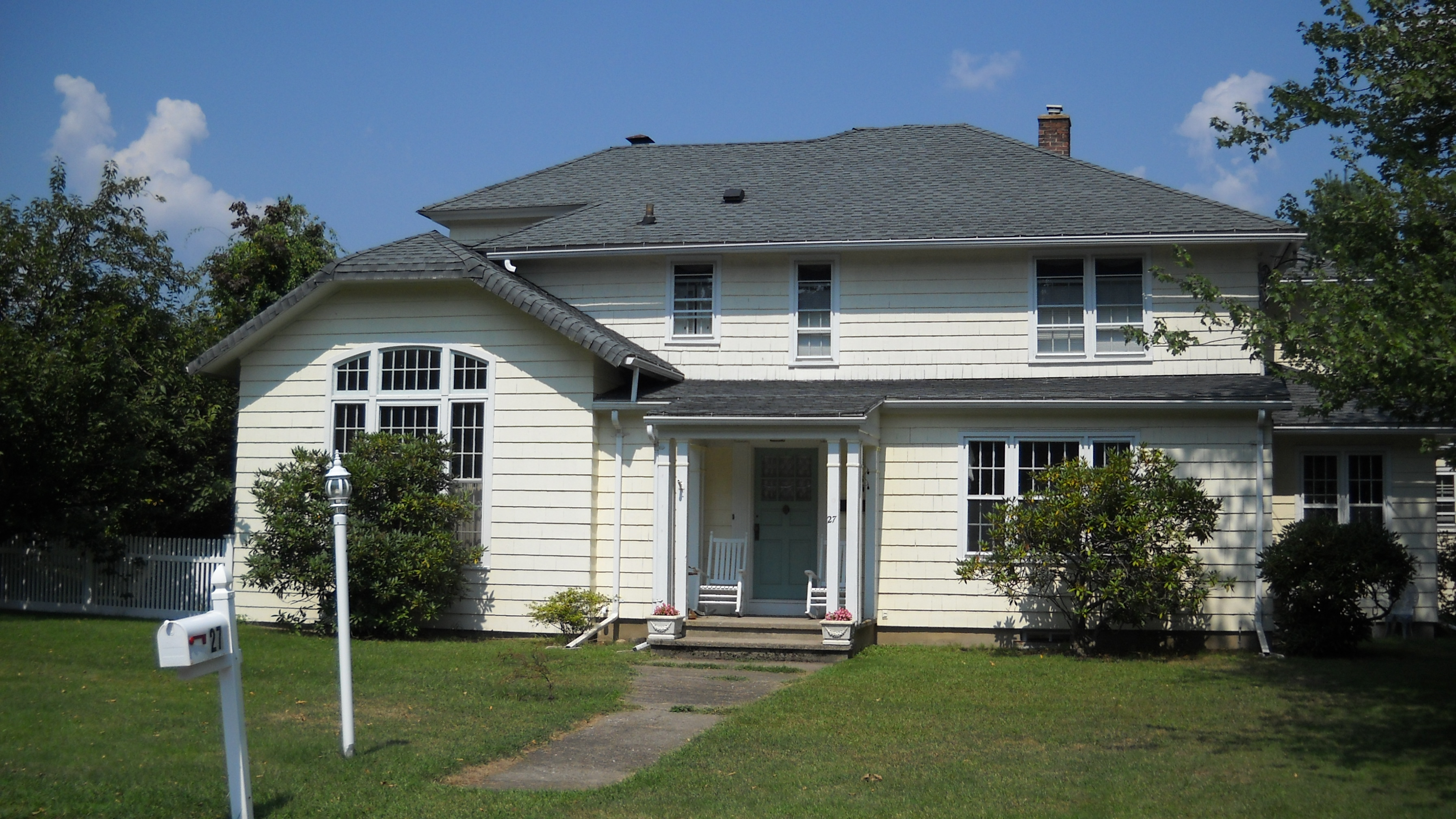
Igor Sikorsky home c. 1934
