= Connecticut Route 121 =

State highway in New Haven County, Connecticut, US

Route 121
- Map of New Haven County in southern Connecticut with Route 121 highlighted in red

Route information
- Maintained by CTDOT
- Length: 5.66 mi (9.11 km)
- Existed: 1932–present

Major junctions
- South end: US 1 in Milford
- Route 15 / Wilbur Cross Parkway in Orange
- North end: Route 34 in Orange

Location
- Country: United States
- State: Connecticut
- Counties: New Haven

Highway system
- Connecticut State Highway System; Interstate; US; State; SSR; SR; Scenic
← Route 120	→ Route 122

Route 121 is a state highway in southern Connecticut running from U.S. Route 1 (US 1) in Milford to Route 34 near the Orange-Derby line.

== Route description ==
Route 121 begins at an intersection with US 1 in Milford and heads north, passing underneath I-95 without a junction 0.3 miles (0.48 km) later, then enters the town of Orange after another 1.5 miles (2.4 km). In Orange, Route 121 continues north, intersecting about half a mile later with Derby-Milford Road, a direct route into Derby, and there is an interchange with Route 15 (Wilbur Cross Parkway) in Orange. after another 1.6 miles (2.6 km). The road continues past the Wilbur Cross Parkway for another 1.6 miles (2.6 km) until the intersection with Route 34 (Derby Turnpike) in the northern edge of Orange, where Route 121 ends. In Milford, Route 121 is known as North Street, while in Orange, it is known as Grassy Hill Road.

== History ==
In the 1920s, the current alignment of Route 121 was known as State Highway 195 and was one of the routes between Milford and Derby. In the 1932 state highway renumbering, old Highway 195 became Route 121. In 1941, Route 121 was shortened when US 1 was relocated from Cherry Street to its current route at the Boston Post Road. North Street south of current Route 1 is still signed as the route for the Milford train station.

== Junction list ==
The entire route is in New Haven County.

Location	mi	km	Destinations	Notes
Milford	0.00	0.00	US 1 – New Haven, Stratford	Southern terminus
Orange	4.03	6.49	Route 15 (Wilbur Cross Parkway) – New Haven, New York City	Exit 41 on Wilbur Cross Parkway
Orange	5.66	9.11	Route 34 – Derby, New Haven	Northern terminus
1.000 mi = 1.609 km; 1.000 km = 0.621 mi
