= Oak Street Connector =

Highway in Connecticut, United States

Route information
- Length: 0.6 mi (970 m)
- Existed: 1959–present
- Component highways: SR 724 (unsigned) entire length

Major junctions
- West end: MLK Boulevard / South Orange Street in New Haven
- East end: I-91 / I-95 in New Haven

Location
- Country: United States
- State: Connecticut
- Counties: New Haven

Highway system
- Connecticut State Highway System; Interstate; US; State; SSR; SR; Scenic
← Route 723	→ Route 725

The Oak Street Connector, officially known as the Richard C. Lee Highway (named after former New Haven mayor Richard C. Lee), is a 0.6-mile-long (0.97 km) freeway carrying State Road 724 in Downtown New Haven, Connecticut, United States. The freeway begins at South Orange Street and ends at the junction of Interstate 91 and Interstate 95. The road formerly carried Route 34 until the early 2020s.

== History ==
As originally planned in 1957, the Connector was supposed to extend as a full expressway extending ten miles (16 km) westward from New Haven to a proposed interchange with Route 8 in the vicinity of the cities of Derby or Shelton, depending on the alignment selected for construction. The current connector section was completed in 1959.

The entire project was conceived with a dual purpose: urban renewal and traffic flow. The first goal was to completely clear this area of New Haven's downtown. The highway replaced Oak Street (formerly Morocco Street) which had been a poor area since the days when leather workers congregated along West Creek. In the beginning of the twentieth century, the area became home to many Jewish and Irish immigrants. The freeway was also meant to bring cars into the city and facilitate the east–west flow of traffic between New Haven and its growing western suburbs. Due to its limited completion, only the first goal can be said to have been fully achieved. Other plans for the highway to be extended into a larger expressway from New Haven to Peekskill, New York were shelved in the mid-1970s, following successful challenges by highway opponents.

The right-of-way between South Frontage Road and Reverend Dr. Martin Luther King, Jr. Boulevard (originally North Frontage Road) in New Haven to Route 10 was preserved for a future extension of the connector past Route 10 to rejoin the existing Route 34 at a signalized intersection west of Route 122 in Orange. A small portion of the planned freeway extension that was built in Orange during the 1980s was used as a commuter parking lot for more than two decades, but now serves as part of an access road for the Yale-New Haven Health Regional Operations Center.

== Decommissioning ==
During Connecticut's budget crisis of 2002, the state of Connecticut sold off land acquired for numerous planned expressways throughout the state, including land set aside for extending the Oak Street Connector. Pfizer Pharmaceuticals purchased a portion of the Oak Street Connector right-of-way, and built a US$35 million research facility on it. The Pfizer deal ensured the Oak Street Connector could not be extended beyond its terminus at the Air Rights Parking Garage near Yale-New Haven Hospital.

After the completion of the Pfizer research facility in 2005, New Haven Mayor John DeStefano, Jr. and several leaders of local civic groups began pushing the Connecticut Department of Transportation (ConnDOT) to study removing part of the existing Oak Street Connector (re-routing traffic onto Legion Avenue and M.L.K. Jr. Boulevard in the process) and replacing it with buildings and developments.

The project would remove the portion of the Oak Street Connector west of South Orange Street, creating two large parcels of land divided by College Street on which buildings and developments could be built. Inbound traffic would be re-routed onto Martin Luther King Jr. Boulevard (aka North Frontage Road) while outbound traffic would be re-routed onto Legion Avenue (aka South Frontage Road). In addition, both roads would be rebuilt and widened to accommodate increased traffic, and furnished with landscaping and bicycle lanes. The road bed of the original highway would be reused as a driveway to and from the Air Rights Garage, allowing commuters to reach the Air Rights Garage while avoiding traffic on College and Church Streets. The segment of the Oak Street Connector east of South Orange Street was retained as a freeway stub connecting the New Frontage Streets with the I-91/I-95 interchange, which itself was also rebuilt from 2011 to 2016. The remaining stub includes the bridge that carries the Oak Street Connector over the New Haven Railyard.

The removal of part of this freeway stub would be part of a larger project called New Haven Downtown Crossing which seeks to reconnect New Haven's Street grid which was originally disconnected by the construction of the connector.

ConnDOT and the City of New Haven began preparing the environmental impact statement for removing the Oak Street Connector in 2011, and in mid-2013 construction began on phase one of Downtown Crossing began which completed the aforementioned upgrades to Martin Luther King Jr. Boulevard, as well as construction of 100 College Street. The Oak Street Connector west of South Orange Street officially closed to westbound traffic on July 14, 2014, with traffic re-routed onto the newly rebuilt Martin Luther King Jr. Boulevard. A portion of the old roadbed remains in use as a driveway to and from the Air Rights Garage. Eastbound traffic was officially rerouted to Legion Avenue in 2018.

== Exit list ==
The entire route is in New Haven, New Haven County.

mi	km	Destinations	Notes
0.0	0.0	MLK Boulevard / South Orange Street	Western terminus; at-grade intersection
0.6	0.97	I-91 north – Hartford; I-95 – New London, New York City	Eastern terminus; exit 1B on I-91 south; exit 47A on I-95
1.000 mi = 1.609 km; 1.000 km = 0.621 mi
