= Pequonnock River =

- Upriver view from the Daniels Farm Road Bridge in Trumbull, CT.

Location
- Country: United States
- State: Connecticut
- Counties: Fairfield

Physical characteristics
- Source: Pequonnock River Watershed
  - location: Lantern Drive & CT Route 25, Monroe, Connecticut, United States
- Mouth: Bridgeport Harbor Light on Long Island Sound
  - location: Bridgeport, Fairfield County, Connecticut, United States
  - coordinates: 41°09′24″N 73°10′48″W
  - elevation: 0 ft (0 m)
- Length: 16.7 mi (26.9 km)
- Basin size: 0.125 mi^{2} (0.32 km^{2})
- Discharge
  - location: Bridgeport, Connecticut

The Pequonnock River is a 16.7-mile-long (26.9 km) waterway in eastern Fairfield County, Connecticut. Its watershed is located in five communities, with the majority of it located within Monroe, Trumbull, and Bridgeport. The river has a penchant for flooding, particularly in spring since the removal of a retention dam in Trumbull in the 1950s. There seems to be a sharp difference of opinion among historians as to just what the Indian word Pequonnock signifies. Some insist it meant cleared field or open ground; others are sure it meant broken ground; while a third group is certain it meant place of slaughter or place of destruction.

== Geography ==
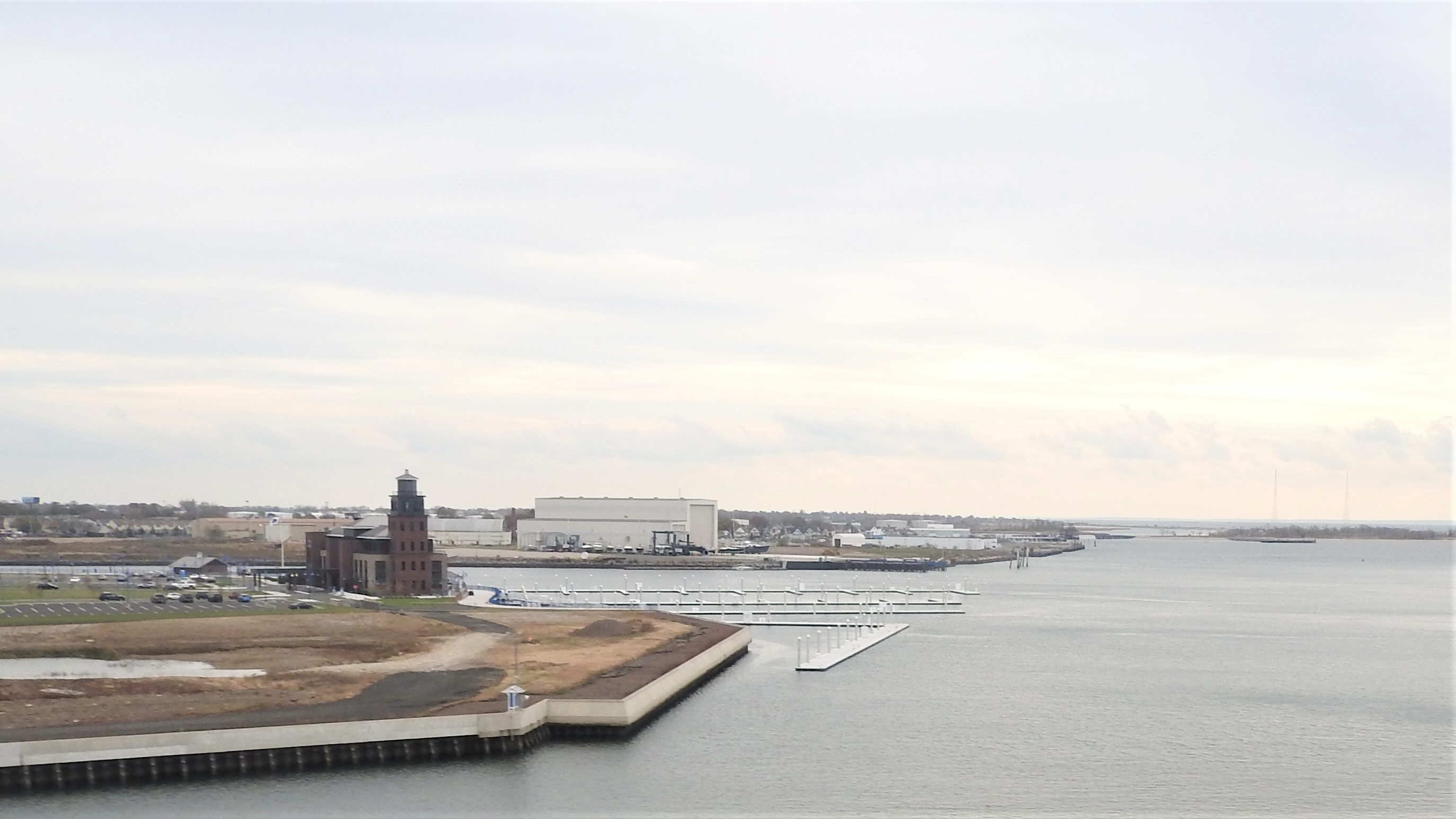
Mouth of Pequannock in Bridgeport

The eastern branch river flows southerly from Monroe through Trumbull past the Old Mine Park Archeological Site and continues to Beardsley Park in Bridgeport, merging at the mouth of Bridgeport Harbor with Long Island Sound at the Bridgeport Harbor Light. The river is dammed in Bridgeport by the Bunnell's Pond Dam (41.208°N 73.187°W) near Connecticut's Beardsley Zoo.

The western branch of the river flows southeasterly in a wide "S" pattern from near the Monroe border with Newtown, Connecticut. The two branches link in Monroe east of the intersection of Route 25 and Purdy Hill Road (41.3004°N 73.2458°W). Less than a mile south of that point in Trumbull, a tributary called North Farrars Brook joins the Pequonnock. Hedgehog Creek and Belden Brook in Trumbull flow into the river southwest of the intersection of Route 25 and Daniels Farm Road. The fourth tributary is Booth Hill Brook, also in Trumbull. It merges northeast of the Route 25 interchange with Route 15 (41.2396°N 73.1858°W). The fifth and final tributary is Island Brook, which joins the river in Bridgeport south of Bunnell Pond and north of the River Street Bridge (41.1970°N 73.1867°W). Island Brook is dammed in Bridgeport by the Forest Lake Dam. (41.220°N 73.207°W)

=== Crossings and navigation ===
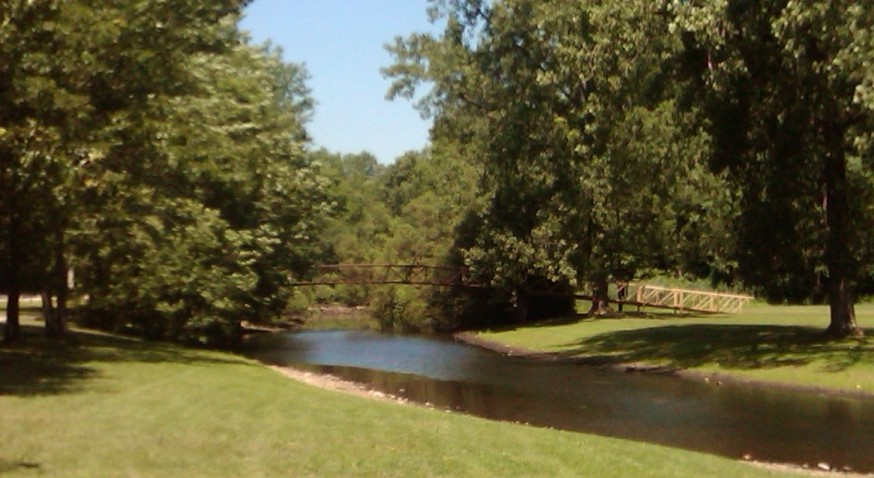
The walking bridge at Old Mine Park Archeological Site.

There was only a single bridge crossing the river (near the home of Noah Plumb) until after the Revolutionary War. A bridge opened in 1798 and led to the foundation of Bridgeport.

Bridgeport

- The southernmost mile of the river is navigable from Long Island Sound by most vessels.
- The Pequonnock River Railroad Bridge was constructed in 1902 and is a notable crossing in Bridgeport. It was placed on the National Register of Historic Places in 1987.
- Bridgeport has multiple drawbridge crossings including the Stratford Avenue Bridge, the railroad bridge, the Congress Street Bridge, the East Washington Avenue Bridge and the Grand Street Bridge. The Congress Street bridge is impassable (since 1997) due to being frozen in the open position. The movable leaves of Congress Street Bridge were taken out in May 2010. The Grand Street Bridge was demolished in 2011.

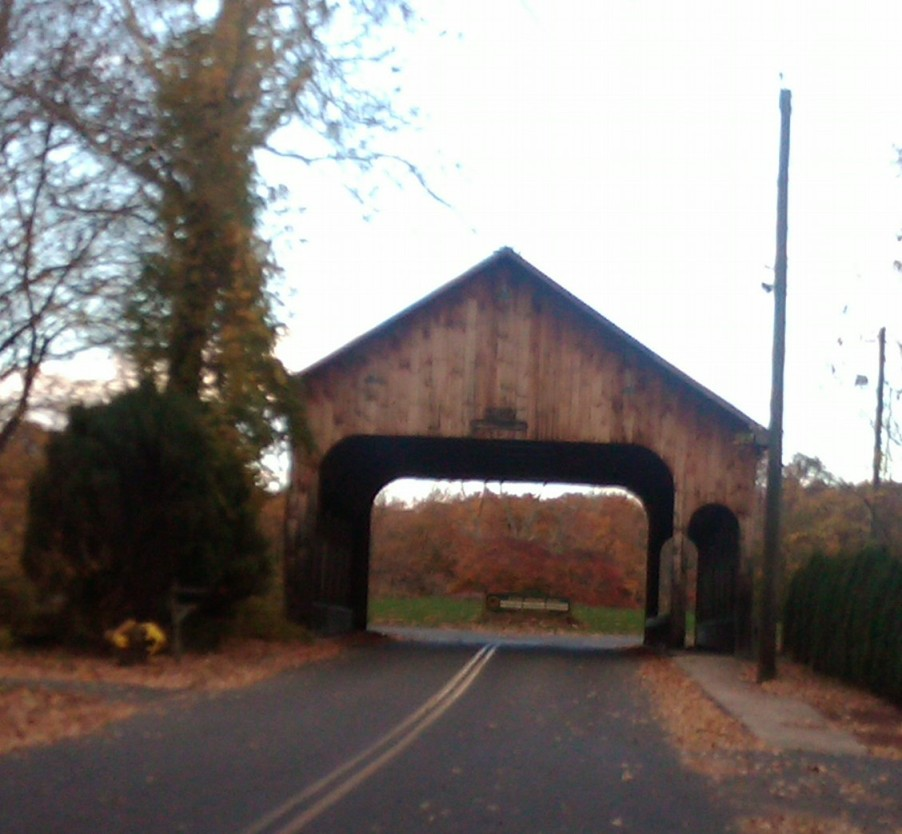
Liz's Bridge in Trumbull.

Trumbull

- A wooden walking bridge is located at Old Mine Park Archeological Site.
- The Twin Brooks Bridge carries Brock Street over the river, connecting Twin Brooks Park to Route 127. It is the only covered bridge on the river.

== History ==
=== Pequonnock village ===
Prior to the arrival of Europeans, the Pequonnock Indians of the Paugussett nation lived on the banks of the river. One village on the west bank of the Pequonnock consisted of about five or six hundred inhabitants in approximately 150 lodgings. The first English settlement on the west bank of the mouth of the Pequonnock was made in about 1665 and was called Pequonnock. This village was renamed Newfield sometime before 1777. During the American Revolution, Newfield was a center of privateering. In 1800, Newfield village was chartered as the borough of Bridgeport, forming the center for the city of Bridgeport.

=== Mills ===
Trumbull National Guard Unit Co. C 8th Reg. of the Connecticut National Guard, Commanded by Capt. Charles E. Plumb, circa 1867. The Grist Mill in the background was built by Gideon and Ephraim Hawley in 1722 at White Plains Road Trumbull

Abandoned millstone in Trumbull at the Daniel Hawley site.

In January 1722, Gideon and Ephraim Hawley agreed to build or rebuild a mill or mills on the stream of the Pequonnock River at the narrows by White Plain just west of White Plains Road. In the mid-18th century, Daniel Hawley built a mill "at the spring on the Pequonnock River" along White Plains Road just north of Daniels Farm Road in Trumbull Center. Daniel, who resided just northeast of the present bridge, was a grand nephew of Gideon and Ephraim Hawley and great grandson of Ephraim Hawley.

Reuben Fairchild and his brothers, Daniel and Eben built the Fairchild Paper Mill in 1826 at a place commonly called since 1674 as the "Falls" of the Pequonnock River. They were guided in their endeavors by Andrew Tait, who had learned the art of paper making in Scotland. Fairchild Paper Mill was the first mill to make white note paper. The company also ran a boarding house for its female employees. The mill stood to the west of White Plains Road near what is today the entrance to Fairchild Memorial Park.

=== Housatonic Railroad ===
From 1840 to 1931, a 15-mile (24 km) segment of the Housatonic Railroad ran along much of the river with stations at Bridgeport, North Bridgeport (Lyons), Trumbull, Long Hill, Stepney, Pepper (Pepper Crossing) & Botsford, finally terminating in New Milford, Connecticut. The Railroad also maintained the Parlor Rock Amusement Park. The railroad was ripped up and replaced with Connecticut Route 25 up to Trumbull, north of which became Pequonnock River Valley State Park.

=== Historic events ===
- 1836: Andrew Tait built a paper and strawboard mill in Trumbull.
- 30 July 1905: A major flood caused 52 people to be drowned and devastation as houses were swept downriver. The schooner Hope Haynes hit a bridge, causing a fire which led to a massive gas line explosion in Bridgeport.
- 16 September 1933: the body of notorious Bridgeport gang boss Patsy Santoro was found in the river.
- 1964: Dredging of Bridgeport Harbor by the Army Corps of Engineers.
- 29 December 1989: for $9,275,000 the 382-acre (1.55 km^{2}) Pequonnock River Valley State Park was founded.
- 18 July 2007: The dismembered corpse of Charles Gerber was found floating in a barrel near the Stratford Avenue Bridge.
- 11 January 2010: a man was killed when his car fell into the river.

== Recreational activities ==
- (Mountain) Biking & Hiking: There are several bicycle and hiking trails in Pequonnock River Valley State Park.
- Fishing: The Connecticut DEP stocks the river with a variety of fish before the spring fishing season.
- Hunting: Bird hunting is legal in Pequonnock River Valley State Park from October 20 to December 22 on Monday, Wednesday, Friday and Saturday.

== Watershed ==
The Pequonnock River watershed is approximately 80 acres (320,000 m^{2}), located at the head of the river in Monroe where it feeds the Easton Reservoir.

== Water quality ==
The river was measured for E. coli on ten separate dates from May through September 2009. Results concluded that the river is to be considered class B (on the Connecticut Department of Environmental Protection rating system) from the watershed through Trumbull and to the entry of Bunnell Pond in Bridgeport. Areas further south on the river such as the Washington Street Bridge and into Bridgeport Harbor have considerably higher levels of e.coli and are correspondingly more polluted.

== Other uses of the word Pequonnock ==
- Pequonnock Iron Works Inc. - A metal fabrication company in Bridgeport.
- Pequonnock National Bank - A bank in Bridgeport in the late 19th and early 20th centuries.
- Pequonnock River Railroad Bridge
- Pequonnock Road, in Trumbull.
- Pequonnock Yacht Club

== See also ==
- History of Bridgeport, Connecticut
- History of Trumbull, Connecticut
- List of rivers of Connecticut
