= Connecticut Route 111 =

State highway in Fairfield County, Connecticut, US

Route 111
- Map of Fairfield County in southwestern Connecticut with Route 111 highlighted in red

Route information
- Maintained by CTDOT
- Length: 11.71 mi (18.85 km)
- Existed: 1932–present

Major junctions
- South end: Route 15 / Merritt Parkway in Trumbull
- Route 25 in Trumbull
- North end: Route 34 in Monroe

Location
- Country: United States
- State: Connecticut
- Counties: Fairfield

Highway system
- Connecticut State Highway System; Interstate; US; State; SSR; SR; Scenic
← Route 110	→ Route 112

Route 111 is a state highway in southwestern Connecticut, United States, running from Route 15 (Merritt Parkway) in Trumbull to Route 34 in Monroe. The junction with the Merritt Parkway is currently the only single-point urban interchange (SPUI) in the entire state.

== Route description ==
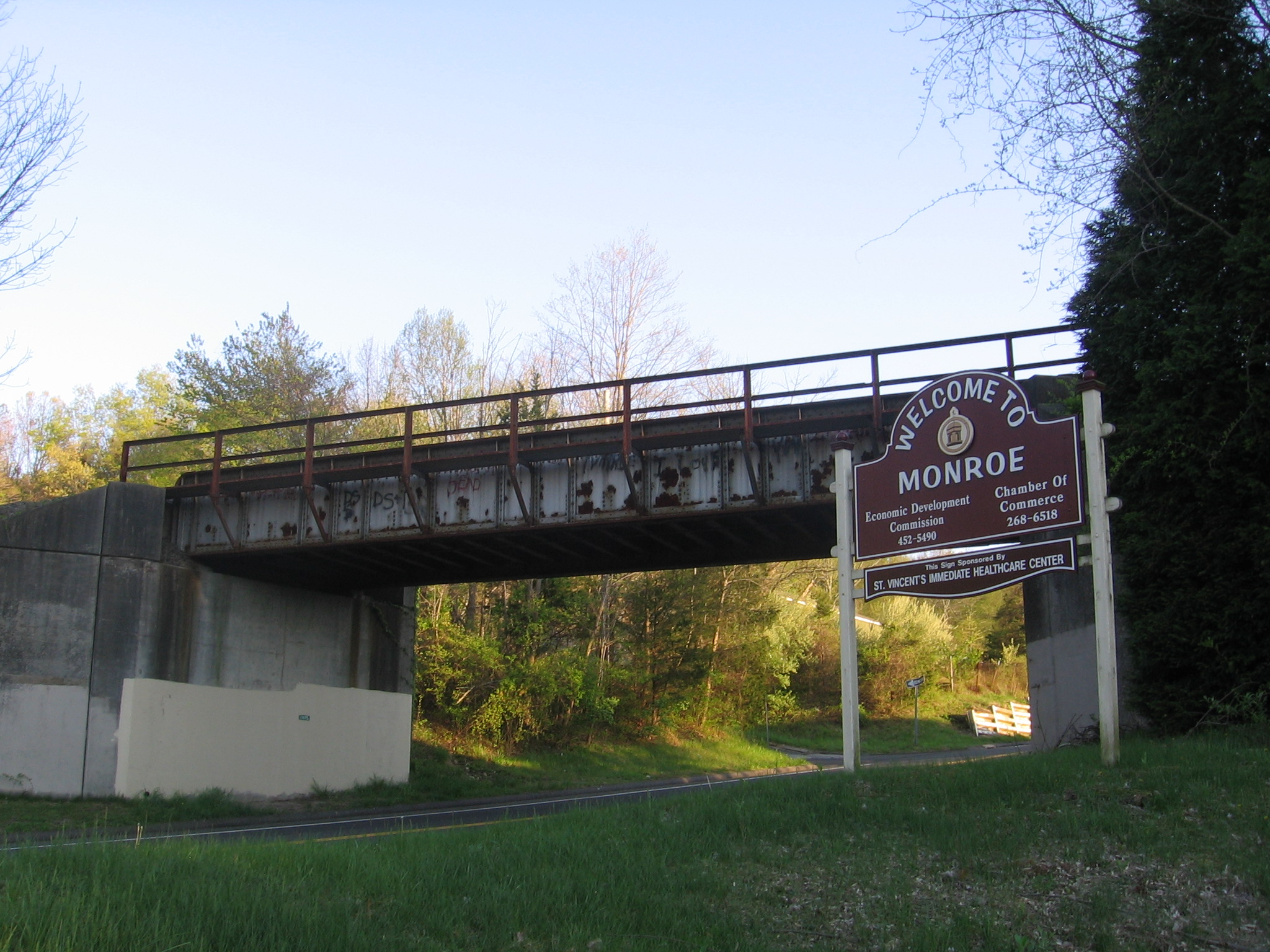
CT 111 as it runs beneath the Housatonic Railroad's Maybrook Line in Monroe.

Route 111 starts as Main Street at an intersection with Route 15 (Merritt Parkway) in Trumbull, just north of the Bridgeport city line. South of Route 15, Main Street continues for another 0.3 miles (0.48 km) to the Bridgeport line as an unsigned state highway with designation State Road 731 and provides access to Trumbull Mall. Route 111 proceeds north, traveling near Island Brook Park, before intersecting Route 127 about 1.8 miles (2.9 km) north of Route 15. Route 111 continues north, paralleling Route 25 through the Long Hill section of Trumbull, then turns northeast to intersecting Route 25. Beyond the junction with Route 25, Route 111 is known as the Monroe Turnpike, which heads on a northerly track towards Monroe. It passes by the Century Plaza shopping center in Monroe and intersects Route 110 at the town center. It continues north, reaching its end at Route 34 in the Stevenson section of Monroe.

== History ==
The road from Trumbull to Stevenson via Monroe center was chartered as a turnpike in May 1826 and was formally known as the Monroe and Zoar Bridge Turnpike. Operations of the turnpike continued through 1852 when the portion north of Monroe center was discontinued. At that time, the road from Bridgeport to Trumbull was already a toll road known as the Bridgeport and Newtown Turnpike, connecting its namesake towns and had been in operation since 1801.

In 1922, the former Monroe and Zoar Bridge Turnpike (more commonly known as simply the Monroe Turnpike) became part of the Connecticut state highway system. It was given the designation State Highway 308 and ran from modern Route 25 to modern Route 34. The continuation into Bridgeport, which would later become Route 25, was at the time part of State Highway 122.

Modern Route 111 was created in the 1932 state highway renumbering from old State Highway 308. In 1982, with the opening of the Route 25 freeway, the former southern section of Route 25 within Trumbull was reassigned to Route 111, while the portion in Bridgeport reverted to the town.

== Junction list ==
The entire route is in Fairfield County.

Location	mi	km	Destinations	Notes
Trumbull	0.00	0.00	Main Street (SR 731 south)	Continuation south
Trumbull	0.00	0.00	Route 15 / Merritt Parkway – New Haven, New York City	Single-point urban interchange; exit 30 on Merritt Parkway
Trumbull	1.78	2.86	Route 127 south – Trumbull, Nichols	Northern terminus of Route 127
Trumbull	4.07	6.55	Route 25 – Newtown, Bridgeport	
Monroe	7.29	11.73	Route 110 south – Shelton	Roundabout; northern terminus of Route 110
Monroe	11.71	18.85	Route 34	Northern terminus
1.000 mi = 1.609 km; 1.000 km = 0.621 mi
