= Derby–Shelton Bridge =

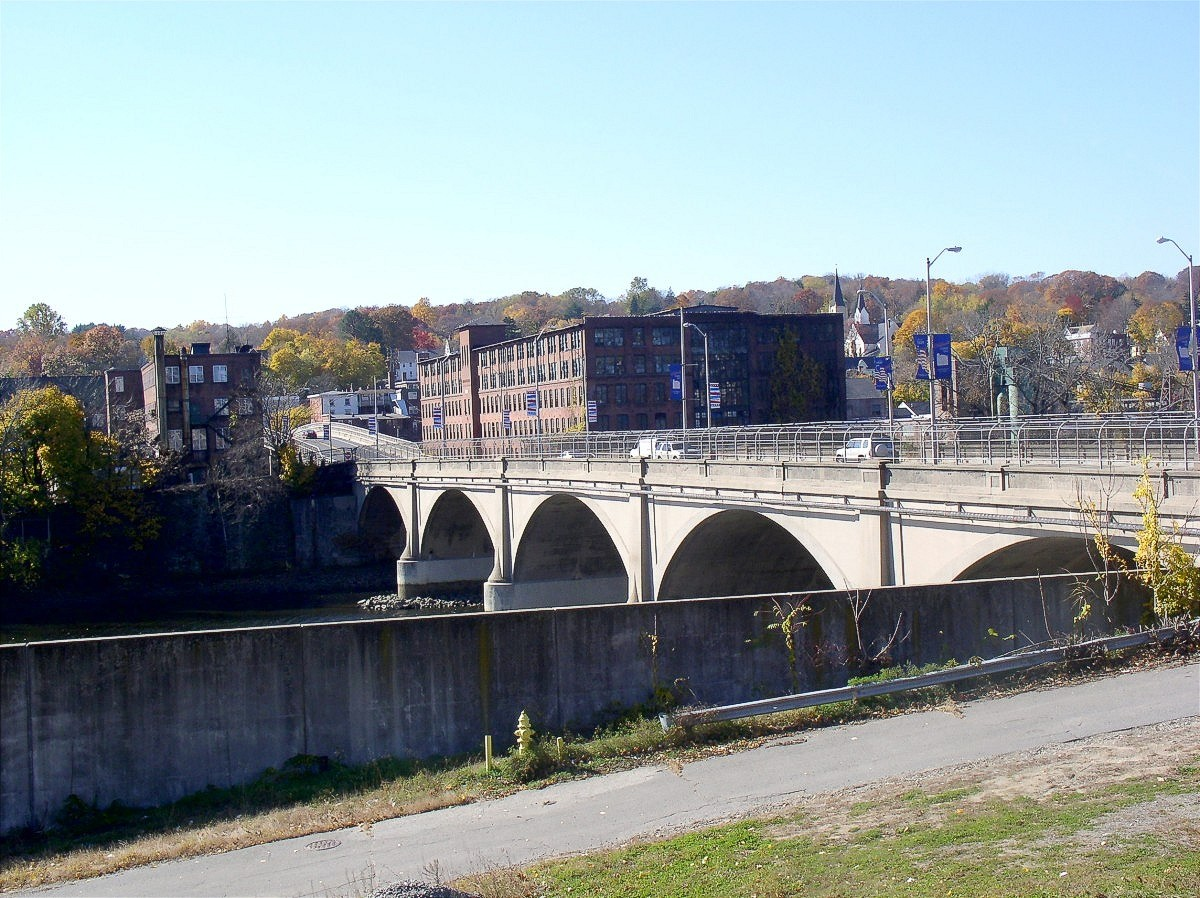
- Derby-Shelton Bridge viewed from the Derby Greenway
- Coordinates: 41°19′08″N 73°05′27″W
- Carries: 2 lanes of Bridge Street (SR 712)
- Crosses: Housatonic River
- Locale: Shelton and Derby (Connecticut)
- Maintained by: Connecticut Department of Transportation

Characteristics
- Design: Closed-spandrel concrete arch bridge
- Total length: 465.9 ft (142 m)
- Width: 66.3 ft (20.2 m)
- No. of spans: 5

History
- Opened: 1918

Statistics
- Daily traffic: 14,000

Location
- Interactive map of Derby–Shelton Bridge

The Derby–Shelton Bridge is a road crossing over the Housatonic River in the U.S. state of Connecticut, connecting the cities of Derby and Shelton. It connects Route 34 in downtown Derby with Route 110 in downtown Shelton. The bridge and approaches are designated but not signed as SR 712. The current bridge (number 01659) was built in 1918 by the Connecticut State Highway Department to replace a former steel-arch bridge built in 1891 known as the Huntington Bridge. Prior to that, an even older wooden covered bridge (built in 1857) was at this site. The Derby–Shelton Bridge used to carry two street railway tracks until the 1930s.

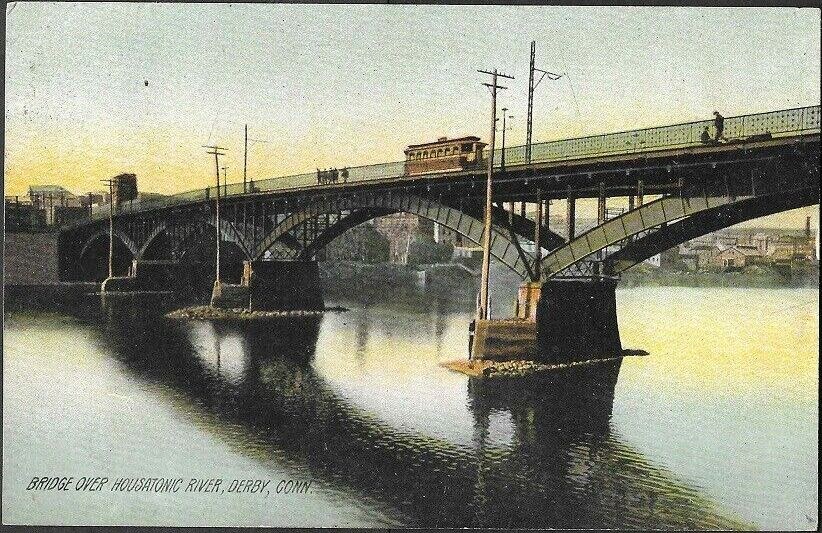
Bridge over the Housatonic in Derby, from a postcard sent in 1908

== Highway designation ==
State Road 712
- Location: Derby–Shelton
- Length: 0.24 mi (390 m)

State Road 712 (SR 712) is a state highway in Shelton, Connecticut. The route is 0.24 miles (0.39 km) long and is also known as Bridge Street. It connects Route 110 to Route 34 across the Housatonic River by the Derby–Shelton Bridge.

SR 712 is the primary crossing of the Housatonic River in the Naugatuck Valley and the route presently includes wide shoulders. Prior to the opening of the Commodore Hull Bridge in 1951, SR 712 was part of the former alignment of Route 8 between Shelton and Derby.

Browse numbered routes
← SR 711	CT	→ SR 713

== Road improvements ==
In 2018, the $4.3 million Connecticut state project No. 126-174 was released for public comment. The primary goal of the project is to enable improve cyclist and pedestrian access between the Derby Greenway and Shelton's Veteran's Park. This project was initiated in response to a pedestrian vs automobile accident in 2011.

The proposed improvements include the following:

- Replace the sidewalk area on the south side of the bridge with a wider sidewalk for a pedestrian plaza and public space to include planter boxes, bi-directional cycle track, and pedestrian sidewalk.
- Replace the sidewalk on the north side of the bridge with a narrower sidewalk.
- Reconstruct the existing roadway with similar bituminous surface and concrete base.
- Reconstruct the bridge concrete parapet and pilasters to be similar to the existing historic design and finish and meet standard heights and vehicular collision criteria, along with decorative railing similar to Veteran's Park.
- Replacement of the existing "Cobra" style lighting, with decorative period light fixtures that meet dark-sky standards.
- Provide decorative accent lighting on the bridge.

Browse numbered routes
← SR 711	SR 712	→ SR 713
