= Connecticut Route 34 =

State highway in Connecticut, US

Route 34
- Map of southern Connecticut with Route 34 highlighted in red

Route information
- Maintained by CTDOT
- Length: 21.88 mi (35.21 km)
- Existed: 1932–present

Major junctions
- West end: Washington Avenue in Newtown
- I-84 / US 6 in Newtown; Route 8 in Derby; Route 15 / Wilbur Cross Parkway in Orange
- East end: Route 10 in New Haven

Location
- Country: United States
- State: Connecticut
- Counties: Fairfield, New Haven

Highway system
- Connecticut State Highway System; Interstate; US; State; SSR; SR; Scenic
← Route 33	→ Route 35

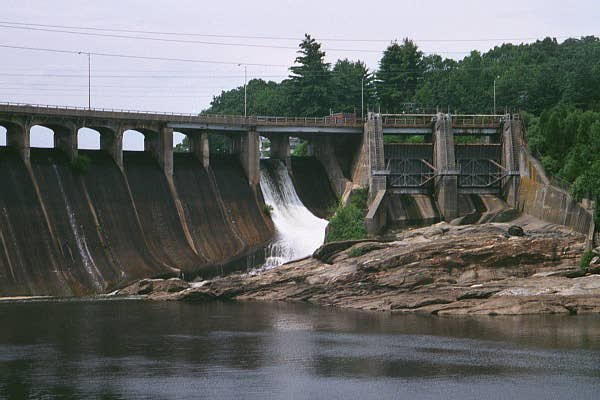
Stevenson Dam, which blocks the Housatonic River to form Lake Zoar, and that also functions as the State Route 34 bridge across the river

Route 34 is a primary state highway in the U.S. state of Connecticut. Route 34 is 21.88 miles (35.21 km) long, and extends from Newtown near I-84 to Route 10 in New Haven. The highways connects the New Haven and Danbury areas via the Lower Naugatuck River Valley. The portion of the route between New Haven and Derby was an early toll road known as the Derby Turnpike. It formerly ran through downtown New Haven on the Oak Street Connector until the early 2020s.

== Route description ==
Route 34 begins as two-lane Berkshire Road in the Sandy Hook Section of the Town of Newtown, as a continuation of Washington Avenue. The road crosses under I-84 after a tenth of a mile, then intersects after another 0.8 mi (1.3 km) with Wasserman Way (SSR 490), which leads to ramps to/from I-84. The road then heads East towards the Stevenson Section of the Town of Monroe, where the road name changes to Roosevelt Drive at the Town line. After intersecting Route 111 (leading to Monroe center), Route 34 crosses the Housatonic River via the Stevenson Dam Bridge into the Town of Oxford. Route 34 then follows the east banks of the Housatonic River as it traverses the Towns of Oxford and Seymour. Route 34 soon enters the City of Derby, where it becomes Main Street after the intersection with the Derby-Shelton Bridge (SR 712), which leads to Route 110 in Downtown Shelton. In Downtown Derby, Route 34 has a Junction with Route 8 near the Derby-Shelton Train Station.

Beyond this Junction, Route 34 expands into a four-lane arterial road, crossing over the Naugatuck River. It intersects Route 115 (for Ansonia and Seymour Center) right after the Bridge then turns Southward as New Haven Avenue as it continues towards the Town of Orange. In Orange, the road becomes Derby Turnpike and has intersections with Route 121 for (Milford). Along the way, it also has a cloverleaf Junction with Route 15 (Wilbur Cross Parkway) Route 152 (for Orange Center) and Route 114 (for Orange and Woodbridge). Route 34 soon enters the Northern edge of West Haven, intersecting with Route 122 (for Westville and West Haven Center). Soon after, the road becomes a four-lane undivided road and crosses into New Haven where the road name changes to Derby Avenue, where it reaches its eastern terminus at Route 10 (Ella Grasso Boulevard).

== History ==
The Derby Turnpike Company was chartered to build a toll road from New Haven to Derby in May 1798. It ran from downtown New Haven, beginning at York Street, and followed Chapel Street to Derby Avenue, which connected to modern Route 34 and continued to Downtown Derby. The Derby Turnpike was the longest-lived of the state's early toll roads and only stopped collecting tolls in 1895. West of Downtown Derby, another turnpike corporation, the Ousatonic Turnpike, was chartered also in 1795 to build a toll road between Derby and New Milford following the east bank of the Housatonic River. Unlike the Derby Turnpike, the Ousatonic proved to be unprofitable. In 1813, the portion between Southbury and New Milford was discontinued as a toll road. In 1834, the northern half of the remaining portion (north of the present Stevenson Dam) was given to another company, the River Turnpike Company, to try to make the road profitable. In 1841, however, the River Turnpike road reverted to the Ousatonic, and the Ousatonic company itself was dissolved the following year in 1842. The portion of the old Ousatonic road north of Stevenson Dam is now mostly submerged as a result of the damming of the Housatonic to form Lake Zoar and Lake Lillinonah.

The state took over the road at the beginning of the 20th century. In 1922, when route numbers were first publicly signed in the New England region, the route from New Haven to the village of Sandy Hook was designated as State Highway 117. The road followed the Derby Turnpike and the remaining portion of the Ousatonic Turnpike to the village of Stevenson, then the rest of modern Route 34 to Sandy Hook. In the 1932 state highway renumbering, old Highway 117 was renumbered to Route 34 with an additional westward extension to the city of Danbury. At the time, Route 34 overlapped with US 6 into the borough of Newtown, then used modern Route 302 to Bethel and modern Route 53 to Downtown Danbury. In 1935, US 202 was established and used the original path of Route 34 between Danbury and Newtown. Route 34 was cut back to end at US 6 in Sandy Hook.

The four-lane section in Derby, Orange, and West Haven was opened in 1940. In the 1940s, Route 34 ended at Sherman Avenue (former US 5 and Route 10). The Oak Street Connector appeared in state highway plans in the mid-1950s and the present freeway opened in 1960. When the freeway opened, Route 34 was designated on it. Route 34 was assigned onto city streets (Chapel Street and George Street) to connect with the original eastern end. When North Frontage Road was completed, Route 34 was relocated onto it via an overlap with current Route 10.

=== Highway removal ===
In December 2008, the City of New Haven received nine proposals for design/engineering services for the planned boulevardization of the Downtown New Haven (limited access) section of Route 34. Plans for redeveloping the highway's western section in New Haven (in a neighborhood also demolished for a limited access highway, but where the highway was never built) have undergone significant public discussion as part of the City of New Haven's MDP process for re-using the 36 acres (150,000 m^{2}) of empty land.

In May 2013, phase one of the New Haven Downtown Crossing project began, intending to reroute Route 34 away from the freeway segment in New Haven onto widened frontage roads. The former highway right of way would be made available to development. Parking is planned beneath the new development to take advantage of the low grade of the former travel lanes. New bridges are also planned to reconnect streets disconnected by the highway, providing bike lanes and sidewalks, as well as pedestrian access to adjacent development. The project will extend from the reconstructed interchange with I-95/I-91 to the highway's terminus at exit 3.

In the early-2020s, Route 34 was undesignated from the former eastern terminus at I-95/I-91 to CT 10, removing its designation along the entire Oak Street Connector.

=== Widening in Derby ===
Beginning in 2011, officials from Derby, the Naugatuck Valley Council of Governments (NVCOG), and the state began preparations to widen a section of Route 34 in Derby from one lane in each direction to two, at an estimated cost of $10 million to $12 million. The proposal also entailed the demolition of several properties along the road. In March 2019, officials demolished four formerly commercial buildings along Route 34 to make room for the widening. The project suffered a long delayed start date, and near doubling in projected costs, drawing the ire of some local residents. Construction finally began on the project in early 2022. Per an announcement by NVCOG in January 2022, construction is estimated to last about 700 days. As of April 2023, the project is still underway.

== Junction list ==
County	Location	mi	km	Destinations	Notes
Fairfield	Newtown	0.00	0.00	Washington Avenue	Continuation west
Fairfield	Newtown	0.79	1.27	I-84 (US 6) to Route 25 – Danbury, Waterbury	Access via SSR 490; exit 16 on I-84
Fairfield	Monroe	5.81	9.35	Route 111 south (Monroe Turnpike) – Monroe, Bridgeport, Stevenson	Northern terminus of Route 111
Housatonic River		6.93– 7.11	11.15– 11.44	Stevenson Dam Bridge	
New Haven	Seymour	9.52	15.32	Route 188 north (Squantuck Road) – Quaker Farms	Southern terminus of Route 188
New Haven	Derby	14.08	22.66	Derby-Shelton Bridge (SR 712 west) to Route 110 – Shelton	
New Haven	Derby	14.25	22.93	Route 8 – Bridgeport, Waterbury	Exit 12B on Route 8
New Haven	Derby	14.75	23.74	Route 115 north (Derby Avenue) – Ansonia	Southern terminus of Route 115
New Haven	Orange	16.58	26.68	Route 121 south (Grassy Hill Road) – Milford	Northern terminus of Route 121
New Haven	Orange	17.36	27.94	Route 15 (Wilbur Cross Parkway) – New York City, New Haven	Cloverleaf interchange; exits 42A and 42B on Wilbur Cross Parkway
New Haven	Orange	17.86	28.74	Route 152 south (Orange Center Road) – Orange	Northern terminus of Route 152
New Haven	Orange	18.38	29.58	Route 114 (Racebrook Road) – Woodbridge, Orange	
New Haven	West Haven	21.02	33.83	Route 122 (Forest Road) – Westville, Allingtown	
New Haven	New Haven	21.88	35.21	Route 10 (Ella T. Grasso Boulevard) – Hamden, City Point	Eastern terminus
1.000 mi = 1.609 km; 1.000 km = 0.621 mi: Closed/former; Concurrency terminus; Incomplete access

== See also ==
- Oak Street Connector — the freeway segment of Route 34 in New Haven
