= Long Hill, Groton, Connecticut =

Census-designated place in Connecticut, United States

Long Hill, Connecticut
- Census-designated place
- Location in New London County, Connecticut
- Coordinates: 41°21′16″N 72°03′24″W
- Country: United States
- State: Connecticut
- County: New London
- Town: Groton

Area
  - Total: 1.6 sq mi (4.1 km^{2})
  - Land: 1.5 sq mi (3.9 km^{2})
  - Water: 0.10 sq mi (0.26 km^{2})
- Elevation: 23 ft (7 m)

Population (2010)
  - Total: 4,205
  - Density: 2,800/sq mi (1,100/km^{2})
- Time zone: UTC−5 (Eastern (EST))
  - Summer (DST): UTC−4 (EDT)
- ZIP code: 06340
- Area code: 860
- FIPS code: 09-43790
- GNIS feature ID: 2377829

Long Hill is a census-designated place (CDP) in the town of Groton in New London County, Connecticut, United States. The population was 4,205 at the 2010 census.

== Geography ==
According to the United States Census Bureau, the CDP has a total area of 1.6 square miles (4.1 km^{2}), of which 1.5 square miles (3.9 km^{2}) is land and 0.1 square miles (0.26 km^{2}), or 5.10%, is water.

== Demographics ==
As of the census of 2000, there were 3,534 people, 1,741 households, and 741 families residing in the CDP. The population density was 2,378.6 inhabitants per square mile (918.4/km^{2}). There were 1,924 housing units at an average density of 1,295.0 per square mile (500.0/km^{2}). The racial makeup of the CDP was 79.06% White, 6.48% African American, 1.25% Native American, 7.56% Asian, 0.34% Pacific Islander, 1.36% from other races, and 3.96% from two or more races. Hispanic or Latino of any race were 4.75% of the population.

There were 1,741 households, out of which 17.5% had children under the age of 18 living with them, 30.7% were married couples living together, 8.6% had a female householder with no husband present, and 57.4% were non-families. 48.7% of all households were made up of individuals, and 19.1% had someone living alone who was 65 years of age or older. The average household size was 1.88 and the average family size was 2.72.

In the CDP, the population was spread out, with 15.9% under the age of 18, 9.0% from 18 to 24, 33.5% from 25 to 44, 19.1% from 45 to 64, and 22.5% who were 65 years of age or older. The median age was 39 years. For every 100 females, there were 90.0 males. For every 100 females age 18 and over, there were 87.6 males.

The median income for a household in the CDP was $41,268, and the median income for a family was $54,531. Males had a median income of $40,861 versus $32,865 for females. The per capita income for the CDP was $23,982. About 5.2% of families and 6.0% of the population were below the poverty line, including 8.1% of those under age 18 and 8.4% of those age 65 or over.

== Education ==
The census-designated place, along with the rest of Groton Town, is in the Groton School District.
