= Connecticut Route 25 =

State highway in Fairfield County, Connecticut, US

Route 25
- Map of Fairfield County in southeastern Connecticut with Route 25 highlighted in red

Route information
- Maintained by CTDOT
- Length: 28.59 mi (46.01 km)
- Existed: 1932–present

Major junctions
- South end: I-95 / Route 8 in Bridgeport
- US 1 in Bridgeport; Route 8 in Bridgeport; Route 127 / Route 15 / Merritt Parkway in Trumbull; US 6 in Newtown; I-84 in Newtown
- North end: US 202 in Brookfield

Location
- Country: United States
- State: Connecticut
- Counties: Fairfield

Highway system
- Connecticut State Highway System; Interstate; US; State; SSR; SR; Scenic
← Route 22	→ Route 27

Route 25 is a 28.59-mile (46.01 km), primary state highway connecting the city of Bridgeport and the town of Brookfield in the U.S. state of Connecticut. Route 25 is a six-lane freeway from Bridgeport to northern Trumbull and a two-lane surface road the rest of the way to Brookfield.

Route 25 was originally laid out as a toll road known as the Bridgeport and Newtown Turnpike in 1801. The Route 25 designation was assigned in 1932 to the turnpike alignment and additionally extended through New Milford all the way to Torrington. The route was cut back to its modern northern terminus in Brookfield in 1974; U.S. Route 202 (US 202) took over the old alignment. The Bridgeport–Newtown corridor had been planned as a freeway since the 1950s. The modern Route 25 freeway was fully open by 1982.

== Route description ==
Route 25 begins at an interchange with Interstate 95 (I-95) in Bridgeport. For the first 3.8 miles (6.1 km) of the route, it is co-signed with the Route 8 freeway. After the split with Route 8, it continues as its own freeway through the town of Trumbull for another 6.1 miles (9.8 km), providing partial access to the Merritt Parkway (Route 15) along its path through the town. The freeway section ends at the junction with Route 111 on the northern edge of town.

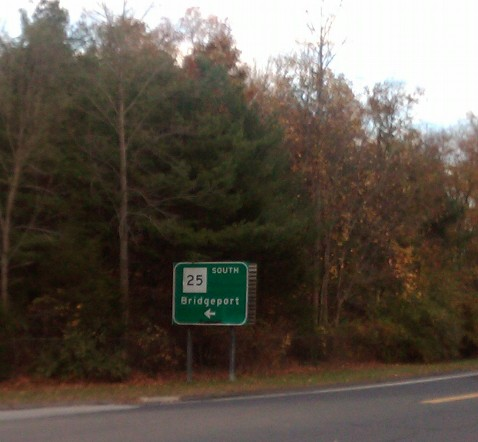
Signage for Route 25 southbound at exit 9 in Trumbull

Route 25 continues northward as a surface road following Main Street into Monroe, where it intersects the northern end of Route 59 in the village of Stepney. Upon entering Newtown, the road becomes known as South Main Street. After intersecting the eastern end of Route 302, it overlaps for 2.7-mile (4.3 km) with US 6 northwest from the town center. After turning north onto Hawleyville Road, it intersects I-84 at exit 11. For the rest of its length, Route 25 is a secondary minor arterial road, crossing Route 133, and ending at US 202 in Brookfield.

== History ==
Route 25 was originally laid out as a toll road known as the Bridgeport and Newtown Turnpike in 1801 and ran from Bridgeport via Newtown borough to Brookfield Center Historic District. In 1848, the northern and southern ends were made free. In the south, tolls were no longer collected within the city limits of Bridgeport, and in the north, the road north of Newtown borough was made free. In 1886, Fairfield County dissolved all turnpike corporations in its jurisdiction, causing the Bridgeport and Newtown Turnpike to become a public road.

Route 25 was designated along the old turnpike route in the 1932 state highway renumbering. When originally designated in 1932, Route 25 continued well beyond Brookfield, following Route 133 and Route 67 to New Milford (via Bridgewater), then turning northeast along modern US 202 before terminating at Route 8 in Torrington. In April 1943, a portion of Route 25 and Route 133 swapped alignments. Route 25 now connected to US 7 in Brookfield and overlapped it to New Milford, bypassing Bridgewater. In 1963, Route 25 was extended further eastward to Route 44 in Canton after the relocation of Route 4. In 1974, US 202 was relocated, and the portion of Route 25 from Brookfield to Canton was taken over by US 202. Route 25 was truncated to its present terminus in Brookfield at this time.

=== Freeway relocation ===
Before the last segment of the Route 25 Expressway opened in 1982, Route 25 originally followed Main Street through Bridgeport northward to the present-day freeway terminus. The old Route 25 through Bridgeport became an extension of Route 111 when the freeway opened.

The Route 25 freeway was originally planned to continue north to meet I-84 in Newtown, where a semi-directional interchange and freeway stub for the planned freeway connection was built. The planned nine-mile (14 km) extension was canceled in 1991, along with many other highway projects due to a fiscal crisis arising when Connecticut was especially hit hard by the late 1980s recession. At that time Connecticut's economy was heavily reliant on the defense industry. The end of the Cold War combined with the recession resulted in a near-total collapse of Connecticut's industrial base, and a loss of billions of dollars in tax revenues generated by these industries.

During the late 1990s, an alternative plan to widen the existing Route 25 to four lanes with a center turn lane in certain spots through Trumbull, Monroe, and Newtown was met with opposition, particularly in Newtown where there was strong opposition to any type of project that will change the existing profile of the Route 25 corridor, despite the high accident rate and congestion on the road. In the early 2000s the Connecticut Department of Transportation (CTDOT) was forced to resort to a plan that will widen and improve intersections on Route 25 from the freeway terminus in Trumbull to the Monroe/Newtown town line, but opposition in Newtown has compelled CTDOT to limit upgrades in that community to spot improvements at major intersections and routine maintenance and periodic rehabilitation or replacement of existing bridges and culverts without adding capacity to the road. To ease traffic congestion in Newtown, CTDOT opened the Mile Hill Road Bypass (SR 860), cutting through the former Fairfield Hills Hospital property and connecting to I-84 and Route 34 at the freeway stub originally intended for Route 25 (now part of SSR 490). Under the belief an freeway will never be built along Route 25 or Route 34, CTDOT plans to remove this freeway stub and the high-speed interchange, replacing it with a diamond interchange within the next 10 years. CTDOT is also planning to build a rest area on land left over when the interchange conversion is complete.

== Junction list ==
Exit numbers were converted from sequential to mile-based in September 2024. The entire route is in Fairfield County.

Location	mi	km	Old exit	New exit	Destinations	Notes
Bridgeport	0.00	0.00	–	1A-B	I-95 – New Haven, New York City Route 8 begins	Southern terminus; signed as exits 1A (I-95 north) and 1B (I-95 south); southern terminus of Route 8; exit 29A/C on I-95
Bridgeport	0.40	0.64	1	1C	Prospect Street, Myrtle Avenue	Southbound exit and northbound entrance
Bridgeport	0.80	1.29	2	1D	Route 130 (Fairfield Avenue)	Southbound exit and northbound entrance
Bridgeport	0.80	1.29	2	1	Golden Hill Street, Main Street	Northbound exit and southbound entrance
Bridgeport	1.44	2.32	3 4	2A	Main Street, Washington Avenue	Southbound exit and northbound entrance
Bridgeport	2.21	3.56	3 4	2A	US 1 / Lindley Street	Northbound exit and southbound entrance; US 1 not signed
Bridgeport	2.80	4.51	5	2B	US 1 (Boston Avenue, North Avenue)	Access via SR 722
Bridgeport	3.75	6.04	6	3	Route 8 north to Route 15 north / Merritt Parkway north – Waterbury, New Haven	Northern end of Route 8 concurrency; northbound exit and southbound entrance
Trumbull	4.03	6.49	6	4	To Route 127 (Old Town Road, White Plains Road)	Southbound exit and northbound entrance
Trumbull	5.12	8.24	7 8	5	Route 127 (White Plains Road) / Route 15 south / Merritt Parkway south – New York City	Northbound exit and southbound entrance; exit 31 on Merritt Parkway
Trumbull	5.12	8.24	7 8	5	Route 15 / Merritt Parkway – Hartford, New York City	Southbound exit and northbound entrance; exits 32A and 32 on Merritt Parkway
Trumbull	6.48	10.43	9	6	Daniels Farm Road – Trumbull	Trumbull not signed northbound
Trumbull	9.87	15.88	Northern end of freeway section			
Trumbull	9.87	15.88			Route 111 – Trumbull, Monroe	
Monroe	12.87	20.71			Route 59 south – Easton	Northern terminus of Route 59
Town of Newtown	19.10	30.74			To I-84 (US 6) / Route 34	Access via SR 860
Borough of Newtown	19.79	31.85			Route 302 west – Bethel	Eastern terminus of Route 302
Borough of Newtown	20.16	32.44			US 6 east to I-84 – Sandy Hook, Waterbury	Southern end of US 6 concurrency
Town of Newtown	22.86	36.79			US 6 west – Danbury	Northern end of US 6 concurrency
Town of Newtown	23.27	37.45			I-84 – Waterbury, Danbury	Exit 11 on I-84
Brookfield	26.89	43.28			Route 133 – Bridgewater	
Brookfield	28.59	46.01			US 202 – Danbury, New Milford	Northern terminus; former US 7
1.000 mi = 1.609 km; 1.000 km = 0.621 mi: Concurrency terminus; Incomplete access
