= Connecticut Route 63 =

State highway in Connecticut, US

Route 63
- Map of western Connecticut with Route 63 highlighted in red

Route information
- Maintained by CTDOT
- Length: 52.57 mi (84.60 km)
- Existed: 1932–present

Major junctions
- South end: Route 10 in New Haven
- Route 15 / Wilbur Cross Parkway in New Haven; Route 8 in Naugatuck; I-84 in Middlebury
- North end: US 7 in Canaan

Location
- Country: United States
- State: Connecticut
- Counties: New Haven, Litchfield

Highway system
- Connecticut State Highway System; Interstate; US; State; SSR; SR; Scenic
← Route 61	→ Route 64

Route 63 is a secondary state highway in the U.S. state of Connecticut, from New Haven up to Canaan, running for 52.57 miles (84.60 km). It connects the Greater New Haven area to Northwestern Connecticut via the western suburbs of Waterbury.

== Route description ==
Route 63 follows a mostly northwest-southeast path its entire route, and is mostly a 2 lane road with some 4 lane sections. It begins at the corner of Whalley Avenue and Fitch Street in New Haven where Route 10 turns onto Fitch Street. Heading northwest on Whalley Avenue, it almost immediately passes the eastern end of Route 243 and the northern end of Route 122. About 0.6 miles later, it leaves Whalley Avenue for Amity Road at the southern end of Route 69. It then passes underneath Route 15 (Wilbur Cross Parkway), offering southbound access only. After crossing into Woodbridge, the road becomes less suburban in nature. In Woodbridge, it intersects the eastern end of Route 114, and the southern/eastern end of Route 67. It then crosses into Bethany, where it has a brief (0.1 mile) concurrency with Route 42. It then enters Naugatuck, where the road takes on a more suburban character. It then meets the Route 8 before crossing the Naugatuck River into the Downtown area. It then passes by the western end of Route 68 before becoming more rural again. After clipping the southwest corner of Waterbury, it enters Middlebury. After meeting the northern end of Route 188, it intersects I-84 with access to/from the west. Access to/from I-84 east is provided by Route 64 at the next intersection. Route 63 then enters Litchfield County and the town of Watertown. Here it is a major retail strip in the southern part of town. It meets the northern end of Route 73 before crossing US 6 in the center of town. It then becomes a minor arterial road north of town, and passes by the eastern end of Route 132 before entering Morris. In Morris, it has junctions with Route 109 and the northern end of Route 61. It then enters Litchfield, where it meets US 202 at the Litchfield Green. Leaving Litchfield, Route 63 becomes a minor rural road as it passes into Goshen. It meets Route 4 at a traffic circle in the center of town. North of there, it passes into Cornwall, where it meets the north end of Route 43, then into the town of Canaan. It has one junction with the southern end of Route 126, which leads to Falls Village. Route 63 ends approximately 1.5 miles later at U.S. Route 7.

A 3.4-mile (5.5 km) section of the road in Litchfield is a designated state scenic road.

== History ==
Route 63 was designated in 1932 and originally connected Morris to Woodbridge using the alignment of the Straits Turnpike, an early 19th-century toll road connecting New Haven to Litchfield. Route 63 is still locally called the Straits Turnpike in Middlebury and Watertown. In the mid-1940s, Route 61 between Morris and Cornwall was reassigned to an extended Route 63. Another extension happened on September 11, 1951 when Route 63 took over part of Route 43 from Cornwall to Canaan where it ends today. In 1954, Route 63 was extended south to US 1 via an overlap with Route 10.

== Junction list ==
County	Location	mi	km	Destinations	Notes
New Haven	New Haven	0.00	0.00	Route 10 (Fitch Street / Whalley Avenue) – Hamden, Westville	Southern terminus
New Haven	New Haven	0.12	0.19	Route 243 west – Ansonia	Eastern terminus of Route 243
New Haven	New Haven	0.71	1.14	Route 122 south – Allingtown	Northern terminus of Route 122
New Haven	New Haven	1.29	2.08	Route 69 north – Bethany, Prospect, Waterbury	Southern terminus of Route 69
New Haven	New Haven	1.51	2.43	Route 15 south (Wilbur Cross Parkway) – New York City	
New Haven	Woodbridge	1.75	2.82	Lucy Street (SR 749 east)	
New Haven	Woodbridge	2.85	4.59	Route 114 west – Orange	Eastern terminus of Route 114
New Haven	Woodbridge	4.69	7.55	Route 67 west – Seymour	Eastern terminus of Route 67
New Haven	Bethany	9.75	15.69	To Route 42 west – Beacon Falls	Access via SR 703
New Haven	Bethany	10.04	16.16	Route 42 west – Beacon Falls	Southern end of Route 42 concurrency
New Haven	Bethany	10.14	16.32	Route 42 east – Cheshire	Northern end of Route 42 concurrency
New Haven	Naugatuck	14.40	23.17	Route 8 / South Main Street (SR 709 north) – Waterbury, Bridgeport	Exit 25A on Route 8
New Haven	Naugatuck	15.80	25.43	Route 68 east – Prospect, Waterbury, Cheshire	Western terminus of Route 68
New Haven	Middlebury	18.07	29.08	Route 188 south – Middlebury Center	Eastern terminus of Route 188
New Haven	Middlebury	18.97	30.53	I-84 west – Danbury	Exit 30 on I-84
New Haven	Middlebury	19.39	31.21	Route 64 to I-84 east – Middlebury, Waterbury	
Litchfield	Watertown	22.93	36.90	Route 73 south – Oakville	Northern terminus of Route 73
Litchfield	Watertown	24.11	38.80	To US 6 west – Woodbury	Access via SR 838
Litchfield	Watertown	24.20	38.95	US 6 – Woodbury, Thomaston	
Litchfield	Watertown	27.35	44.02	Route 132 south – Bethlehem	Northern terminus of Route 132
Litchfield	Morris	30.81	49.58	Route 109 – Morris, Thomaston	
Litchfield	Morris	32.18	51.79	Route 61 south – Bethlehem, Morris	Northern terminus of Route 61
Litchfield	Litchfield	34.91	56.18	Route 118 east – Harwinton	Western terminus of Route 118
Litchfield	Litchfield	34.95	56.25	US 202 east – Torrington	Southern end of US 202 concurrency
Litchfield	Litchfield	34.99	56.31	US 202 west – New Milford	Northern end of US 202 concurrency
Litchfield	Goshen	41.18	66.27	Route 4 – Cornwall, Torrington	Roundabout
Litchfield	Cornwall	47.62	76.64	Route 43 south – Cornwall	Northern terminus of Route 43
Litchfield	Canaan	51.21	82.41	Route 126 north – Falls Village	Southern terminus of Route 126
Litchfield	Canaan	52.46	84.43	To US 7 south – Sharon	Access via SR 812
Litchfield	Canaan	52.57	84.60	US 7 north – Canaan, Norfolk, Sheffield	Northern terminus
1.000 mi = 1.609 km; 1.000 km = 0.621 mi: Concurrency terminus; Incomplete access
