= Connecticut Route 199 =

State highway in Litchfield County, Connecticut, US

Route 199
- Map of Litchfield County in northwestern Connecticut with Route 199 highlighted in red

Route information
- Maintained by CTDOT
- Length: 4.62 mi (7.44 km)
- Existed: 1935–present

Major junctions
- South end: Route 67 in Roxbury
- North end: Route 47 in Washington

Location
- Country: United States
- State: Connecticut
- Counties: Litchfield

Highway system
- Connecticut State Highway System; Interstate; US; State; SSR; SR; Scenic
← Route 198	→ Route 200

Route 199 is a rural state highway in western Connecticut, running from Roxbury to Washington.

== Route description ==
Route 199 begins at an intersection with Route 67 north of the town center of Roxbury. It heads north along North Street towards the town of Washington, crossing Battle Swamp Brook along the way. In Washington, the road name changes to Roxbury Road and the route continues north to end at an intersection with Route 47 in Washington center.

== History ==
The road between Roxbury and Washington centers was designated as a state highway in 1922 and known as Highway 196. In the 1932 state highway renumbering, old Highway 196 was renumbered to Route 131 with an additional southern extension along South Street to the village of Roxbury Falls. In 1935, the 9.3-mile (15.0 km) Route 131 was renumbered to Route 199. In 1950, Route 191 was extended in a "U" pattern along Minor Bridge Road and Hut Hill Road to Clapboard Road (SR 867) in Bridgewater center. As part of the 1962 Route Reclassification Act, the southern end of Route 199 was truncated to Route 67. The former section was turned over to the towns of Roxbury and Bridgewater.

== Junction list ==
The entire route is in Litchfield County.

Location	mi	km	Destinations	Notes
Roxbury	0.00	0.00	Route 67 – New Milford, Southbury	Southern terminus
Washington	4.62	7.44	Route 47 – Woodbury, New Preston	Northern terminus
1.000 mi = 1.609 km; 1.000 km = 0.621 mi
