= Connecticut Route 313 =

State highway in New Haven County, Connecticut, US

Route 313
- Map of New Haven County in southern Connecticut with Route 313 highlighted in red

Route information
- Maintained by CTDOT
- Length: 6.85 mi (11.02 km)
- Existed: 1963–present

Major junctions
- West end: Route 8 / Route 67 in Seymour
- East end: Route 243 in Woodbridge

Location
- Country: United States
- State: Connecticut
- Counties: New Haven

Highway system
- Connecticut State Highway System; Interstate; US; State; SSR; SR; Scenic
← Route 309	→ Route 314

Route 313 is a Connecticut state highway in the outer northwestern New Haven suburbs, running from Seymour to Woodbridge.

== Route description ==
Route 313 begins at an intersection with Route 67 in Seymour. It heads briefly south along the Naugatuck River and underneath Route 8 without an interchange, then turns east across the Naugatuck River. It briefly overlaps with Route 115 before continuing southeast to the southeast corner of Seymour and crossing into Woodbridge. In Woodbridge, it continues southeast to end at an intersection with Route 243.

== History ==
The Rimmon Road section of Route 313 in Seymour and Woodbridge was established as the Rimmon Falls Turnpike in 1802; the turnpike was operational until at least 1838. In 1936, the Woodbridge portion of the turnpike (Rimmon Road) was taken over by the state as SR 563. In the 1962 Route Reclassification Act, River Street in Seymour was designated as SR 728, the Broad Street bridge was designated as SR 713, and SR 563 was extended northwest along Maple Street. These three unsigned state roads were combined into Route 313 in 1963 and has had no major changes since.

== Junction list ==
The entire route is in New Haven County.

Location	mi	km	Destinations	Notes
Seymour	0.00	0.00	Route 8 / Route 67 – Oxford, Woodbridge	Western terminus; exit 18 on Route 8
Seymour	0.50	0.80	Route 115 north	Western end of Route 115 concurrency
Seymour	0.57	0.92	Route 115 south – Ansonia, Derby	Eastern end of Route 115 concurrency
Woodbridge	4.76	7.66	Route 114 – Orange, Woodbridge Center	
Woodbridge	6.85	11.02	Route 243 – Westville, Ansonia	Eastern terminus
1.000 mi = 1.609 km; 1.000 km = 0.621 mi: Concurrency terminus
