= Connecticut Route 243 =

State highway in New Haven County, Connecticut, US

Route 243
- Map of New Haven County in southern Connecticut with Route 243 highlighted in red

Route information
- Maintained by CTDOT
- Length: 6.70 mi (10.78 km)
- Existed: 1963–present

Major junctions
- West end: Route 115 in Ansonia
- East end: Route 63 in New Haven

Location
- Country: United States
- State: Connecticut
- Counties: New Haven

Highway system
- Connecticut State Highway System; Interstate; US; State; SSR; SR; Scenic
← Route 234	→ Route 244

Route 243 is a state highway in the US state of Connecticut running for 6.70 miles (10.78 km) from Route 115 at the Ansonia-Derby town line to Route 63 in New Haven. It serves the Westville neighborhood of New Haven and the southern portions of the towns of Woodbridge and Ansonia. The roadway continues across the Naugatuck River as State Road 853 (SR 853) leading to Route 8.

== Route description ==
Route 243 begins in the Westville neighborhood of New Haven as Fountain Street, branching from Whalley Avenue (Route 63 towards the west, while Whalley Avenue continues northwest). Fountain Street passes by the Westville Post Office then continues through the residential part of Westville. Along the way, it intersects Route 122 (Forest Road and Dayton Street). Fountain Street continues west, passing underneath Route 15 (Wilbur Cross Parkway) and does not have an interchange with it. From there, Route 243 continues into the town of Woodbridge. Within Woodbridge, it intersects with Woodfield Road, which provides access to the Woodbridge Country Club. After the junction with Route 313, the road changes name to Ansonia Road. About 1.6 miles (2.6 km) later, it intersects with Route 114 (Racebrook Road), which leads to Orange (south) and Woodbridge center (north). Route 243 then enters the city of Ansonia, just north of the Derby city line. Within Ansonia, the road becomes known as Pulaski Highway. At the end of the road, Route 243 then turns onto Prindle Avenue, then onto Platt Street, then onto Elm Street, finally ending at Route 115 (Main Street) south of Downtown Ansonia near the Derby line. Across Main Street, the road becomes Division Street, an unsigned state highway connector across the Naugatuck River that connects to Pershing Drive (SR 727) in Derby. Division Street has the unsigned designation SR 853.

== History ==
Fountain Street was originally part of a 19th century turnpike known as the Rimmon Falls Turnpike. The old turnpike connected New Haven and Seymour via modern Route 313 and Fountain Street. In 1932, Route 114, connecting Route 63 in Woodbridge (then part of Route 67) to Woodbridge Center and then ending back at former Route 67 in Westville, was established along Center Road, Racebrook Road, and Ansonia Road/Fountain Street. In 1951, the southern leg of Route 114 was relocated to end at U.S. Route 1 in Orange instead. The Ansonia Road/Fountain Street portion of old Route 114 became an unnumbered state road. Route 243 was established in 1963 from this piece of old Route 114 and the westward continuation of Ansonia Road/Pulaski Highway, which was also an unnumbered state road.

== Junction list ==
The entire route is in New Haven County.

Location	mi	km	Destinations	Notes
Ansonia	0.00	0.00	Route 115 / Division Street (SR 853 west) – Derby, Seymour	Western terminus
Woodbridge	3.18	5.12	Route 114 – Woodbridge Center, Orange	
Woodbridge	4.78	7.69	Route 313 west – Seymour	Eastern terminus of Route 313
New Haven	6.21	9.99	Route 122 – Westville, West Haven	
New Haven	6.70	10.78	Route 63 south to Route 10 – Downtown New Haven	Eastern terminus
1.000 mi = 1.609 km; 1.000 km = 0.621 mi
