= Connecticut Route 172 =

State highway in New Haven County, Connecticut, US

Route 172
- Map of New Haven County in southern Connecticut with Route 172 highlighted in red

Route information
- Maintained by CTDOT
- Length: 4.45 mi (7.16 km)
- Existed: 1932–present

Major junctions
- South end: I-84 / US 6 in Southbury
- North end: Route 67 in Southbury

Location
- Country: United States
- State: Connecticut
- Counties: New Haven

Highway system
- Connecticut State Highway System; Interstate; US; State; SSR; SR; Scenic
| ← Route 171 | → Route 173 |

Route 172 is a minor Connecticut state highway running entirely within the town of Southbury. The road serves the village of South Britain.

== Route description ==
Route 172 begins at an interchange with I-84 / US 6 in western Southbury. It officially begins at the eastbound off-ramp at exit 20 of I-84, where it also intersects Main Street South, the surface route to Southbury center. Route 172 proceeds northward, following a C-curve route, crossing the Pomperaug River into the village of South Britain in the western part of Southbury about a mile later. The road continues north for another three miles (5 km) before ending at an intersection with Route 67 in northern Southbury. The entire route is known as South Britain Road and is classified as a collector road. It carries average volumes of 7,000 vehicles per day.

== History ==
Route 172 was created as part of the 1932 state highway renumbering from a previously unnumbered road. It was extended to an interchange with I-84 in 1963.

== Major intersections ==
The entire route is in Southbury, New Haven County.

| mi | km | Destinations | Notes |
|---|---|---|---|
| 0.00 | 0.00 | I-84 (US 6) – Waterbury, Danbury | Southern terminus; exit 20 on I-84 |
| 4.45 | 7.16 | Route 67 – Southbury, Roxbury, Bridgewater, New Milford | Northern terminus |
1.000 mi = 1.609 km; 1.000 km = 0.621 mi
