= Valeria Stupnitsky Batorewicz =

American architect (1936–1983)

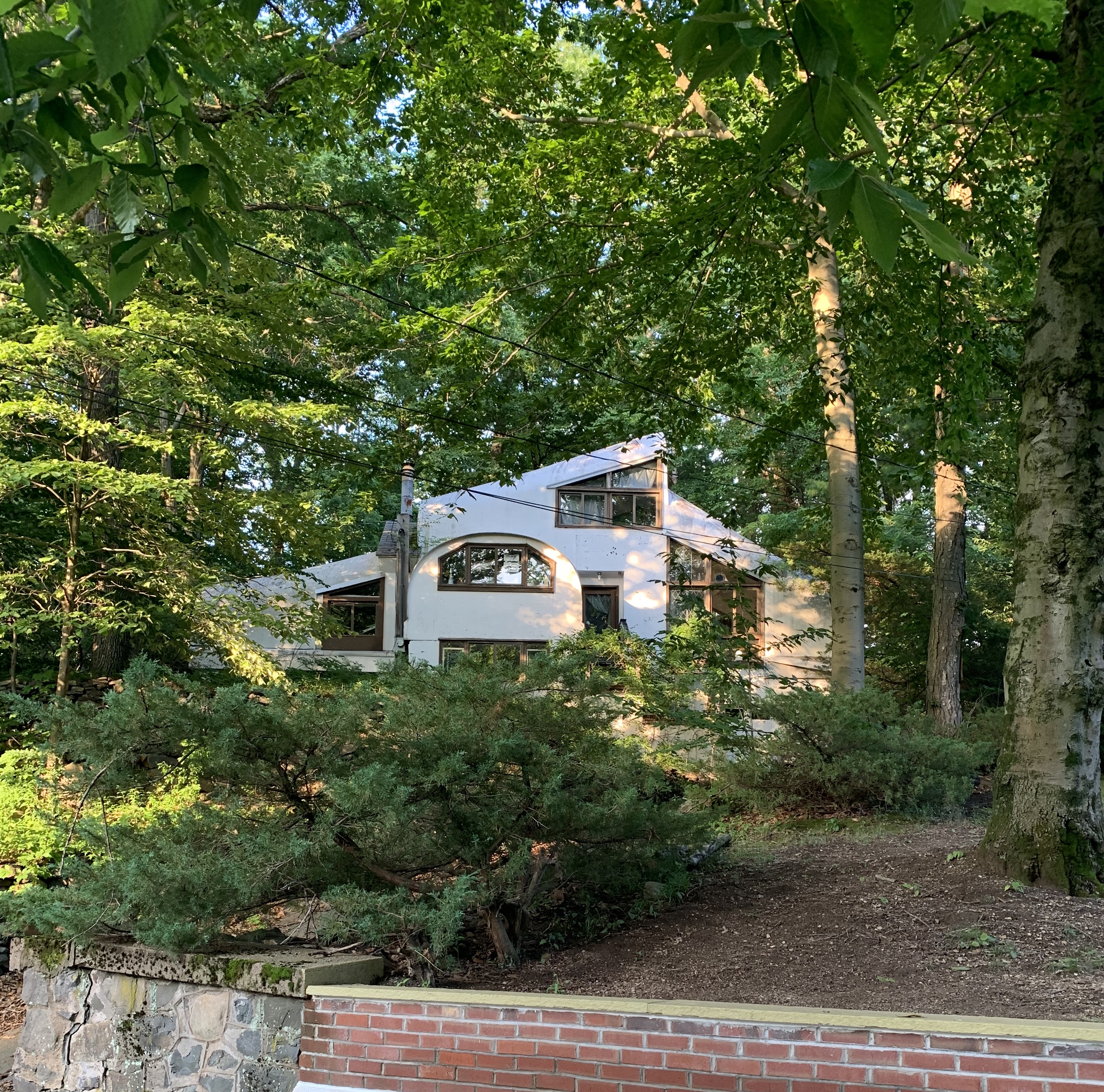
Environ A, seen from the sidewalk in New Haven, Connecticut, in 2020

Valeria Stupnitsky Batorewicz (May 19, 1936 – May 10, 1983) was an American architect who specialized in prefabricated housing. Her most notable work, Environ A or the Plastic House, was a prototype for efficient, affordable, prefabricated housing in the mid-twentieth century that made early use of plastics as an architectural material.

== Early life and education ==
Valeria Stupnitsky was born on May 19, 1936, in Kharkiv, Ukraine. She moved with her family to Bavaria, Venezuela, and Minneapolis, Minnesota. Stupnitsky studied architecture in Venezuela before receiving her bachelor's degree in architecture from the University of Minnesota in 1959. Following a Fulbright Fellowship in Spain spent studying architectural history, she attended Yale University, where she received a Masters of Environmental Design in 1969.

== Career ==
Batorewicz came to Yale intent on studying housing issues, and was first supported by a $1,250 grant from the Center Church-on-the-Green in New Haven. The Church had previously collaborated with Yale on developing experimental housing as a form of social action. In 1968, Batorewicz received an additional grant of $10,000 from Yale to study problems in housing, followed by two additional $5,000 grants from the First Church of Christ and its Ladies Home Missionary Society.

Environ A, the resulting house, was constructed in the Westville neighborhood of New Haven, Connecticut and finished in 1972. It utilized a central core that contained the bathroom and kitchen plumbing, a small electrical furnace, and a stairway. Each room in the house, which Batorewicz referred to as "satellites," was then attached to the core. Each satellite's roof was both curved and slanted to account for its construction in fiberglass-reinforced plastic sprayed with isocyanurate foam insulation and to prevent the accumulation of snow. A cement-resin material applied after made the house waterproof. Environ A contains a master bedroom, kitchen, family room, office, music room, and second-story living room, each with variable lengths but a common width of 11 feet 4 inches.

At the time of its construction, Environ A could be ordered from Housing Systems Corporation at a cost of $25,000, or about $22 per square foot.

== Personal life ==
Valeria married Wadim Batorewicz (1934–2017), a chemist who received a PhD from the University of Minnesota and became a senior research scientist at Uniroyal Chemical Company, where he specialized in industrial polymer research.
