= Connecticut Route 133 =

State highway in western Connecticut, US

Route 133
- Map of western Connecticut with Route 133 highlighted in red

Route information
- Maintained by CTDOT
- Length: 8.36 mi (13.45 km)
- Existed: 1932–present

Major junctions
- South end: US 202 in Brookfield
- North end: Route 67 in Bridgewater

Location
- Country: United States
- State: Connecticut
- Counties: Fairfield, Litchfield

Highway system
- Connecticut State Highway System; Interstate; US; State; SSR; SR; Scenic
← Route 132	→ Route 135

Route 133 is a state highway in western Connecticut, running from U.S. Route 202 in Brookfield to Route 67 in Bridgewater.

== Route description ==
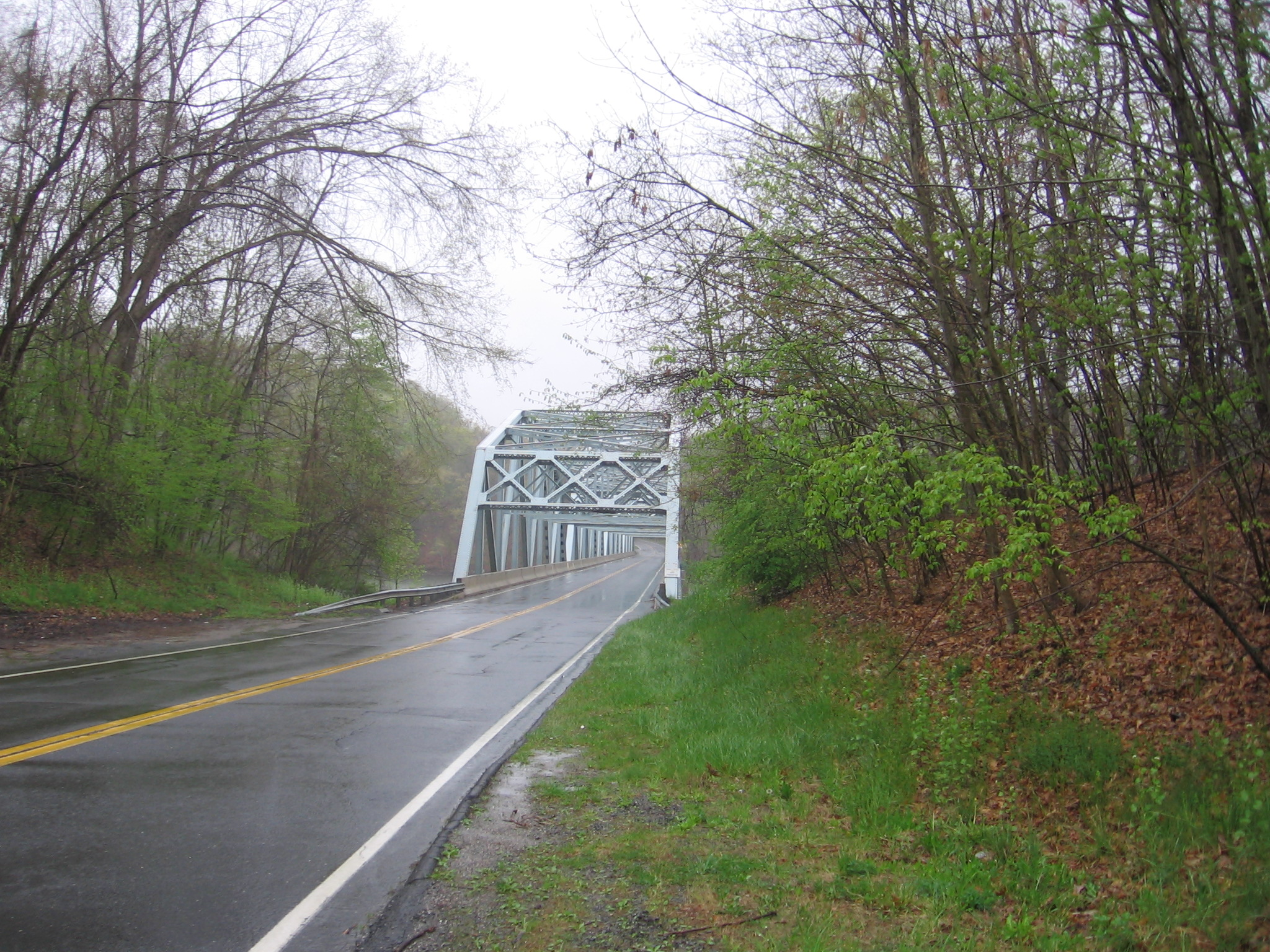
The Southville Bridge seen from Brookfield

Route 133 begins as Junction Road at an intersection with US 202 in western Brookfield. It heads east across the Still River and US 7 without a junction along the "Lance Corporal John T. Schmidt Memorial Bridge", heading towards Brookfield Center. At Brookfield Center, it has a junction with Route 25, which leads to the Brookfield Four Corners (the town center) and to Newtown. Past Route 25, it becomes Obtuse Road, passing by Center Elementary School, as it continues for another 2.3 miles (3.7 km) to the Housatonic River and Lake Lillinonah. It crosses the Housatonic on the Southville Bridge and enters the town of Bridgewater. In Bridgewater, the road turns north and becomes Main Street South as it proceeds towards the town center. It continues north in Bridgewater as Main Street North for another 0.7 miles (1.1 km), until it ends at an intersection with Route 67 north of the town center.

== History ==
In the 1920s, the alignment of modern Route 133 was known as State Highway 182. In 1932, Route 133 was created and used part of old Highway 182 from Federal Road (US 202) to Brookfield Center, then turned north along Whisconier Road (modern Route 25) to end back at Federal Road in Brookfield village. The portion of Old Highway 182 north and east of Brookfield Center was assigned as part of Route 25. In April 1943, the alignments of Routes 25 and 133 in Brookfield were exchanged to conform to traffic patterns, which relocated the northern terminus of Route 133 to Clapboard Road, a former alignment of Route 67. The bridge over the Housatonic River was replaced in 1955 as part of the creation of Lake Lillinonah. In 1959, Route 67 was re-routed from Clapboard Road to its current location and Route 133 extended to meet the new alignment.

== Major intersections ==
County	Location	mi	km	Destinations	Notes
Fairfield	Brookfield	0.00	0.00	US 202 – New Milford, Brookfield	Southern terminus; former US 7
Fairfield	Brookfield	1.27	2.04	Route 25 – Brookfield, Newtown	
Lake Lillinonah				Southville Bridge	
Litchfield	Bridgewater	7.61	12.25	Clapboard Road (SR 867 east)	
Litchfield	Bridgewater	8.37	13.47	Route 67 – New Milford, Roxbury, Southbury	Northern terminus
1.000 mi = 1.609 km; 1.000 km = 0.621 mi
