= Wooster Sawmill and Gristmill Site =

- U.S. National Register of Historic Places
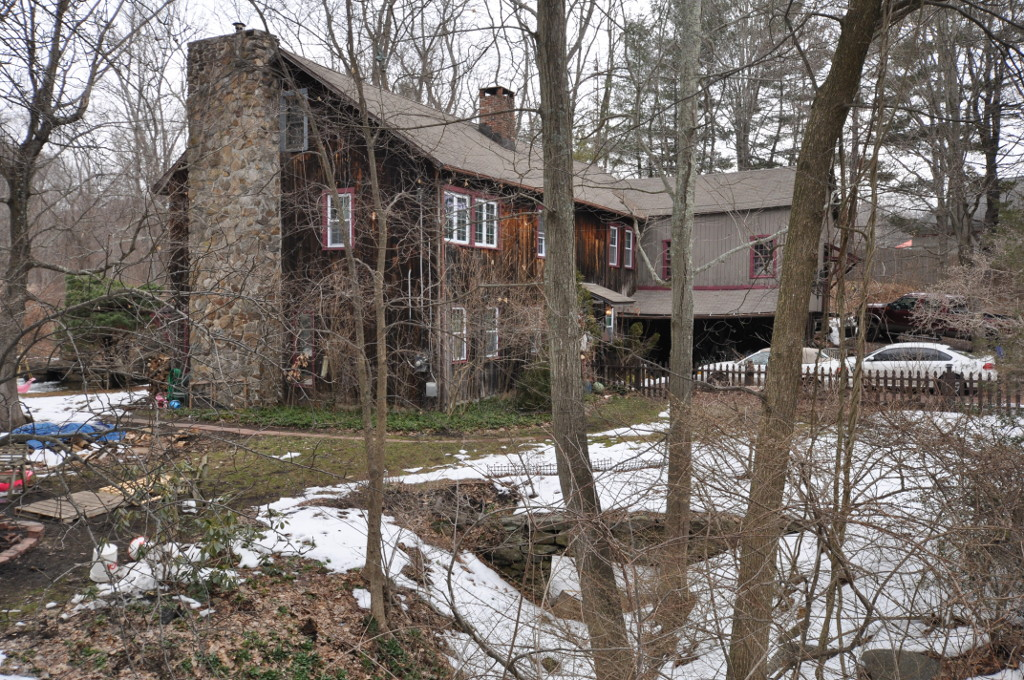

- Location within Connecticut Location within the United States
- Location: Park Road at Little River, Oxford, Connecticut
- Coordinates: 41°24′35″N 73°5′54″W
- Area: 6 acres (2.4 ha)
- Built: 1747
- Built by: John Wooster
- NRHP reference No.: 01000879
- Added to NRHP: August 17, 2001

The Wooster Sawmill and Gristmill Site is a historic industrial site on Park Road in Oxford, Connecticut. From at least 1747 until 1965 it was operated as a sawmill, gristmill, and cider mill, giving it one of the longest known histories as a water-powered mill complex in the United States. The surviving elements of the complex, its structures now converted to private residential use, were listed on the National Register of Historic Places in 2001.

== Description and history ==
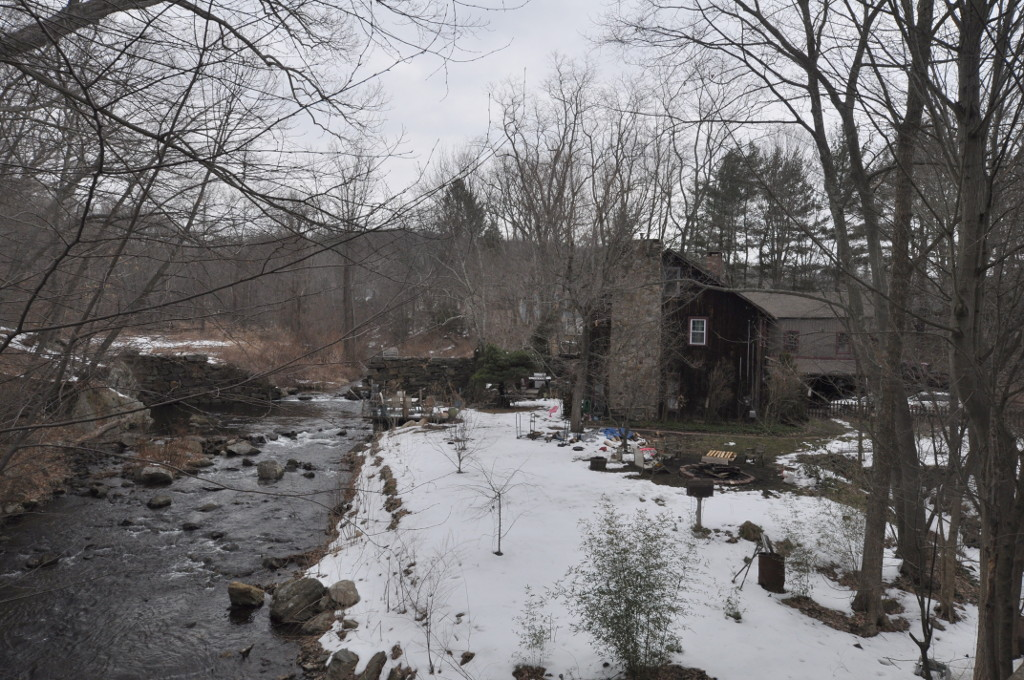
View of surviving elements at the site

The former Wooster mill site is located in southeastern Oxford, on the northside of Park Road where it crosses the Little River, a short way west of Connecticut Route 67. Surviving elements of the complex include a now-breached dam and remnants of the mill pond, and a mill building which has been converted into a private residence. The mill building is a two-story wood-frame structure built in the 1920s, covered with a gabled roof. As part of its residential conversion, elements of the mill power equipment were preserved, including the last water turbine to provide its power.

The property's industrial history dates to at least 1747, when standing mills at this site are mentioned in a property sale record. The property was purchased about 1750 by Captain John Wooster, who also operated a tavern on the nearby turnpike (now CT 67). In 1926 the mill was purchased by Joe Montriski, who operated the mill until his death in 1965. Montriski built the present mill structure, which also served as a family residence. He adapted a 19th-century reaction turbine to provide water power to the mill, which sawed lumber and ground apples into cider. The property was sold by his family in 1971, and converted to residential use.

== See also ==
- National Register of Historic Places listings in New Haven County, Connecticut
