= Connecticut Route 42 =

State highway in New Haven County, Connecticut, US

Route 42
- Map of New Haven County in southern Connecticut with Route 42 highlighted in red

Route information
- Maintained by CTDOT
- Length: 13.66 mi (21.98 km)
- Existed: 1963–present

Major junctions
- West end: Route 67 in Oxford
- Route 8 in Beacon Falls
- East end: Route 10 in Cheshire

Location
- Country: United States
- State: Connecticut
- Counties: New Haven

Highway system
- Connecticut State Highway System; Interstate; US; State; SSR; SR; Scenic
← Route 41	→ Route 43

Route 42 is an east–west state highway in Connecticut running for 13.66 miles (21.98 km) from Route 67 in Oxford to Route 10 in Cheshire.

== Route description ==
Route 42 begins at an intersection with Route 67 just east of the town center of Oxford as Chestnut Tree Hill Road Extension . The route makes several 90-degree turns as it shifts to Chestnut Tree Hill Road and then to Pines Bridge Road. The road soon enters the town of Beacon Falls, crossing over the Naugatuck River a mile beyond the town line. Route 42 continues along the east bank of the Naugatuck River via a short (0.25-mi) section of Old Turnpike Road to a partial interchange with Route 8, where only access to southbound and from northbound Route 8 is possible. Past Route 8, the road becomes known as South Main Street, a divided four-lane road. 0.7 miles (1.1 km) beyond the Route 8 junction, Route 42 turns east onto Bethany Road while South Main Street continues north into Beacon Falls center.

Route 42 again makes several 90-degree turns as it proceeds eastward, shifting from Bethany Road to Munson Road then to Lasky Road. After 2.4 miles (3.9 km), Route 42 enters the town of Bethany and the road name changes to Beacon Road . About two miles (3 km) later, the road ends at Old Litchfield Turnpike near the junction with Route 63. Vehicles bound for southbound Route 63 are directed onto the south branch (unsigned State Road 703) while those bound for Route 63 northbound and those following Route 42 are directed on the north branch (Route 42 proper). After overlapping Route 63 for a tenth of a mile, Route 42 continues east on Cheshire Road, intersecting with Route 69 about a mile later. The road then clips the town of Prospect for about 0.4 miles (as Mountain Road) before entering the town of Cheshire. In Cheshire, the road name becomes Bethany Mountain Road as it traverses the ridge separating Prospect/Bethany and Cheshire (part of the Metacomet Ridge). At the end of Bethany Mountain Road, Route 42 turns north onto North Brooksvale Road. The road runs for another 1.8 miles (2.9 km) and ends at Route 10 (South Main Street) south of Cheshire center.

== History ==
Route 42 was established in 1963 as a result of the Route Reclassification Act from unsigned state roads that were taken over by the state the previous year. When first designated, Route 42 extended from Route 8 in the town center of Beacon Falls to Route 10 in the Brooksvale section of Cheshire. In Beacon Falls, the original route used Burton Road instead of the modern alignment on Bethany Road and Munson Road. In 1967, Route 42 was extended west of Route 8 from Pines Bridge to Route 67 in the town center of Oxford. In 1968, Route 42 was relocated southward to bypass Beacon Falls center to its modern alignment along Bethany Road.

== Junction list ==
The entire route is in New Haven County.

Location	mi	km	Destinations	Notes
Oxford	0.00	0.00	Route 67 – Oxford, Southbury	Western terminus
Beacon Falls	3.17	5.10	Route 8 south – Bridgeport	Exit 21 on Route 8
Beacon Falls			To Route 8 north – Waterbury	Access via South Main Street
Bethany	8.21	13.21	To Route 63 south – New Haven	Access via SR 703
Bethany	8.35	13.44	Route 63 south – New Haven	Western end of Route 63 concurrency
Bethany	8.45	13.60	Route 63 north – Naugatuck	Eastern end of Route 63 concurrency
Bethany	9.71	15.63	Route 69 – Prospect, New Haven	
Cheshire	13.66	21.98	Route 10 – Southington, Hamden, New Haven	Eastern terminus
1.000 mi = 1.609 km; 1.000 km = 0.621 mi: Concurrency terminus
