= Connecticut Route 317 =

State highway in Litchfield County, Connecticut, US

Route 317
- Map of Litchfield County in northwestern Connecticut with Route 317 highlighted in red

Route information
- Maintained by CTDOT
- Length: 6.10 mi (9.82 km)
- Existed: 1964–present

Major junctions
- West end: Route 67 in Roxbury
- East end: US 6 in Woodbury

Location
- Country: United States
- State: Connecticut
- Counties: Litchfield

Highway system
- Connecticut State Highway System; Interstate; US; State; SSR; SR; Scenic
← Route 316	→ Route 318

Route 317 is a state highway in west central Connecticut running from Route 67 in Roxbury to a junction with U.S. Route 6 in Woodbury. The section of Route 317 from Route 67 to Painter Hill Road in Roxbury is designated a scenic road.

== Route description ==
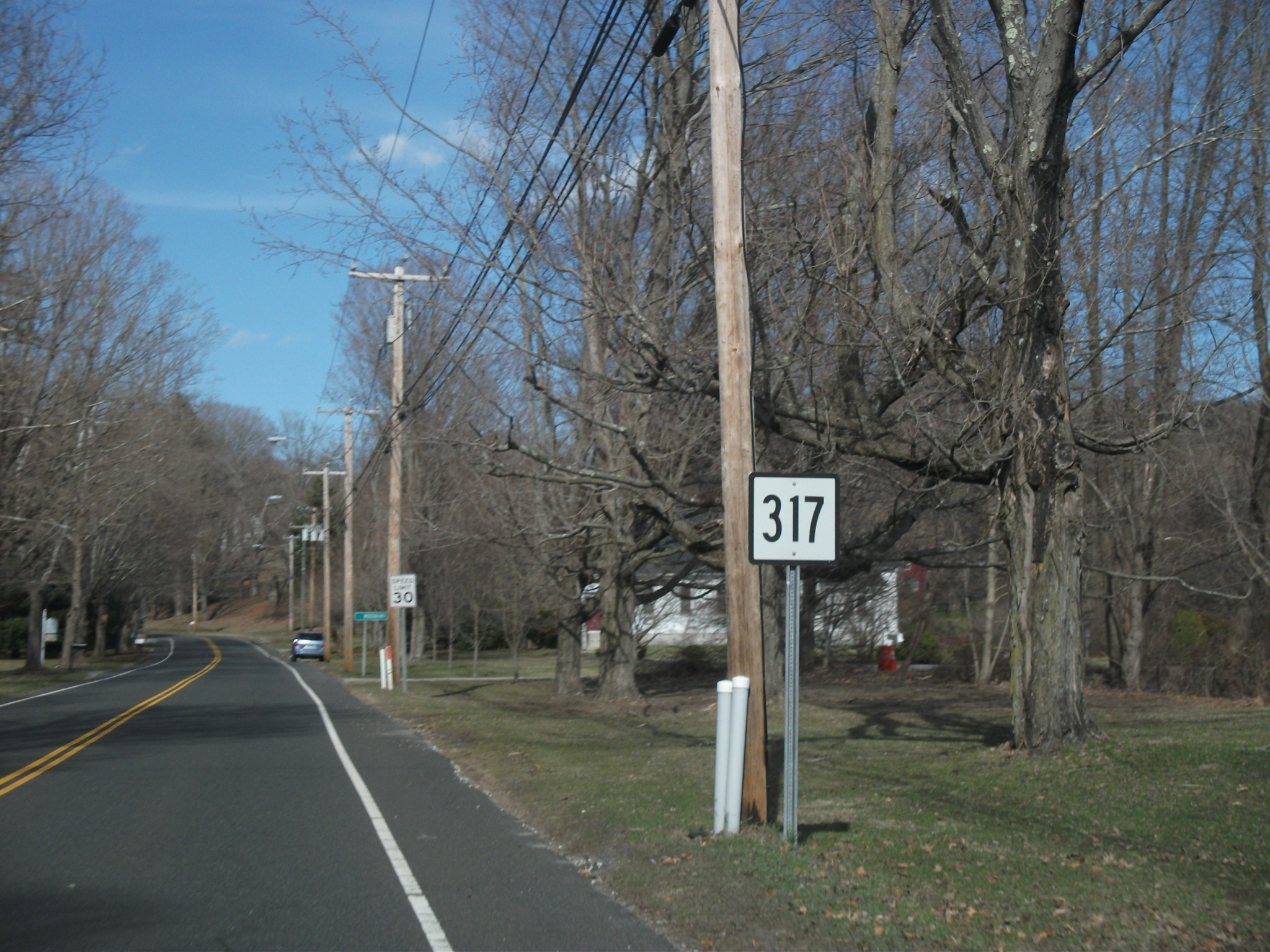
Route 317 heading eastward through Roxbury. Signage to Woodbury can be seen in the distance

Route 317 begins at an intersection with Route 67 (Church and Southbury Roads) in the town center of Roxbury, Connecticut. Route 317 progresses to the north along Church Street passing Roxbury Congregational Church before turning to the northeast and intersecting with Painter Hill Road, where it changes name to Good Hill Road. After Painter Hill, the surroundings become rural and bend to the southeast into the town of Woodbury. After passing a few homes near the intersections of Lower and Upper County Road, the surroundings continue to be rural woodlands, passing a stretch of residential homes heading downhill into the swamplands nearby.

At the three-way junction with Bacon Road, Route 317 turns to the east, passing through a large stretch of mixed surroundings. After passing a small airfield, the route turns to the southeast once again, passes a large farm and enters woodlands once again. At Whittlesey Road, Route 317 takes an even further curve to the southeast, entering the downtown portions of Woodbury. Near the intersection with Old Grassy Hill Road, the highway turns to the northeast and changes names to Sycamore Avenue at the intersection with Transylvania Road. Route 317 continues east further in to downtown Woodbury, where it turns to the north and terminates at an intersection with U.S. Route 6 (Main Street South).

== History ==
Route 317 was commissioned in 1964 from SR 517, and has had no significant changes since.

== Junction list ==
The entire route is in Litchfield County.

Location	mi	km	Destinations	Notes
Roxbury	0.00	0.00	Route 67 – New Milford, Southbury	Western terminus
Woodbury	6.10	9.82	US 6 – Southbury, Watertown	Eastern terminus
1.000 mi = 1.609 km; 1.000 km = 0.621 mi
