= Quaker Farms Historic District =

Historic district in Connecticut, United States

- U.S. National Register of Historic Places
- U.S. Historic district
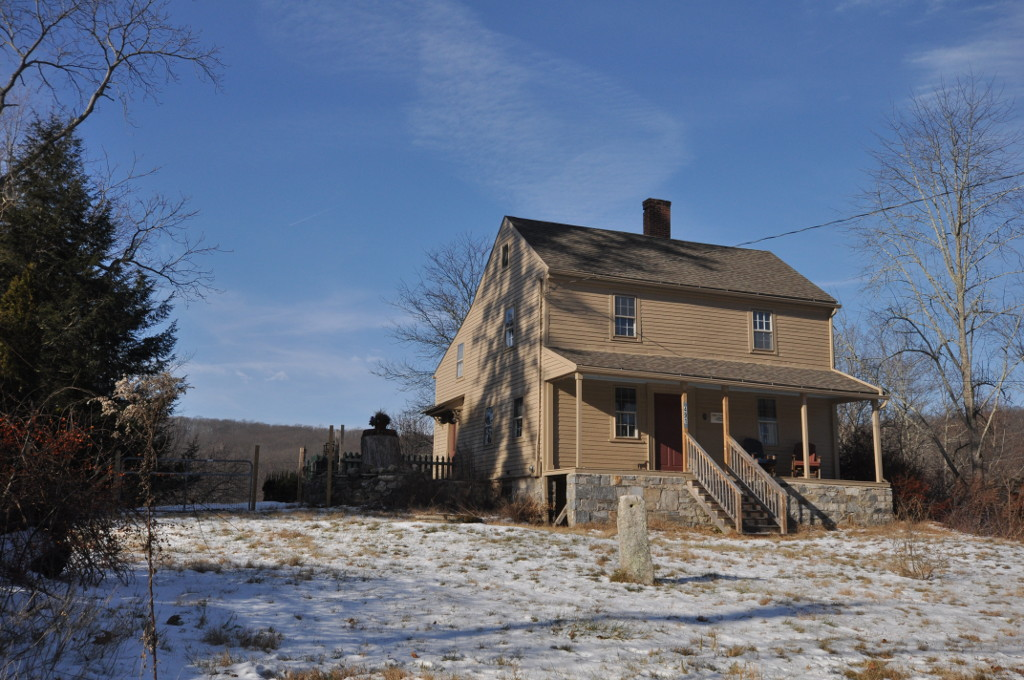

- Location within Connecticut Location within the United States
- Location: 467-511 Quaker Farms Road CT 188 Oxford, Connecticut
- Coordinates: 41°25′34″N 73°9′24″W
- Area: 15 acres (6.1 ha)
- Built: 1725
- Architect: Boult, George
- Architectural style: Colonial Revival, Greek Revival, Federal
- NRHP reference No.: 91000993
- Added to NRHP: August 9, 1991

The Quaker Farms Historic District is a historic district in the town of Oxford, Connecticut, United States. It encompasses a small rural village on Quaker Farms Road (CT 188) anchored by the Christ Church Episcopal, an 1812 wood-frame church with Federal and Gothic styling, located at 470 Quaker Farms Road. The district also includes eleven houses built between the mid-18th and mid-19th centuries. The oldest houses date to the 1720s, and the church has a particularly well-preserved early 19th-century interior, albeit with some alterations. One house was built about 1800 as a carriage manufactory. The district was listed on the National Register of Historic Places in 1991.

The Quaker Farms area was first settled by English colonists in the 17th century, primarily from Derby about 8 miles (13 km) to the south, extending along the main road between Derby and Woodbury. The name "Quaker Farms" was in use in the 18th century, but its origin is not known. Oxford was incorporated in the late 18th century, and the Quaker Farms area had grown sufficiently by the 1810s to warrant an Episcopal parish separate from that at the town center. This period of growth is reflected in the surviving architecture of the village, which mostly predates 1850. There is a single instance of Victorian Queen Anne architecture, at 489 Quaker Farms Road CT 188. A small number of Colonial Revival houses were built in the village in the early 20th century.

== See also ==
- National Register of Historic Places listings in New Haven County, Connecticut
