= Westville Village Historic District =

Historic district in Connecticut, United States

- U.S. National Register of Historic Places
- U.S. Historic district
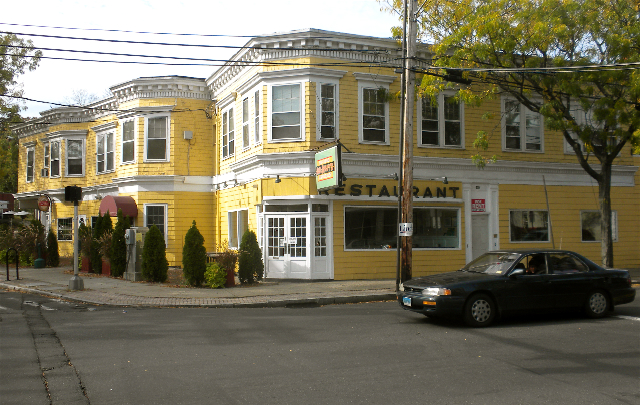
- Hotel Edgewood (1913), 882-888 Whalley Avenue

- Location within Connecticut Location within the United States
- Location: Roughly along Blake Street and Whalley Avenue (original); 827 Whalley Avenue (increase), New Haven, Connecticut
- Coordinates: 41°19′50″N 73°10′20″W
- Area: 22 acres (8.9 ha) (original) and less than one acre (increase)
- Architect: multiple
- Architectural style: Federal, Greek Revival, et al. (original); Early Commercial (increase)
- NRHP reference No.: 02001727 (original); 06000954 (increase)

Significant dates
- Added to NRHP: January 23, 2003
- Boundary increase: October 25, 2006

Westville Village Historic District is a historic district representing most of the commercial center of the Westville neighborhood of New Haven, Connecticut. This center developed in the 19th century as an industrial mill village distinct from the city center, and retains many architectural features of that period. The district was listed on the National Register of Historic Places in 2003, and its boundaries were increased slightly in 2006.

== Description and history ==
When the New Haven Colony was established in the 17th century, the Westville area was mainly agricultural, with Whalley Avenue providing the principal means of access from homes in the town center to those lands. Its village beginnings date roughly to 1797, when a bridge was built over the West River, turning Whalley Avenue into a more important transportation link. Some early settlers had harnessed the power of the local waterways for saw and gristmills, and there were gunpowder mills in the area that were targeted by British raids in the American Revolutionary War. In the late 18th and early 19th centuries, larger mills devoted to textile and paper production were established. This led to further industrialization later in the 19th century, and the village gained further significance when a horse trolley line was extended to it in 1861. Westville was annexed to New Haven in 1872.

The village as it developed includes number of buildings that were originally built at residences, but have mostly been converted to commercial uses, as well as purpose-built commercial and mixed commercial-residential buildings. In 2003, the listed area was 22 acres (8.9 ha) and there were 30 contributing buildings in the district. The listing was amended in 2006 to add the former Westville Theater building at 827 Whalley Avenue, an Early Commercial style building that was built in 1912. The theater building is now occupied by an antiques store.

== Contributing properties ==
When listed, the district included 34 buildings, of which 30 were deemed contributing buildings. The contributing buildings are:

1. 446 Blake Street, Greist Manufacturing Company
2. 495 Blake Street, Geometric Tool Company
3. 512 Blake Street, c. 1840 (See photo #13 in accompanying photo set)
4. 15-17 Tour Avenue, Italianate, c.1905
5. 23-25 Tour Avenue, Queen Anne, c.1905
6. 413 West Rock Avenue, a Queen Anne style house
7. 416-418 West Rock Avenue, Queen Anne
8. 417 West Rock Avenue
9. 420-422 West Rock Avenue
10. 426 West Rock Avenue, Tudor Revival
11. 831-835 Whalley Avenue, the Alfred Minor Building
12. 837-839 Whalley Avenue
13. 843 Whalley Avenue
14. 845-847 Whalley Avenue
15. 859-861 Whalley Avenue
16. 865 Whalley Avenue
17. 867 Whalley Avenue
18. 873-875 Whalley Avenue
19. 879 Whalley Avenue
20. 881 Whalley Avenue
21. 882-888 Whalley Avenue, Hotel Edgewood (photo #9)
22. 883-889 Whalley Avenue
23. 893-901 Whalley Avenue
24. 898 Whalley Avenue
25. 900-902 Whalley Avenue
26. 903-911 Whalley Avenue, a Masonic hall built for the Olive Branch Temple Corporation
27. 904-906 Whalley Avenue
28. 914-918 Whalley Avenue
29. 920 Whalley Avenue
30. 949 Whalley Avenue, the Westville Masonic Temple, from 1926 (see photo #6 in photos accompanying NRHP nomination)

== Gallery ==
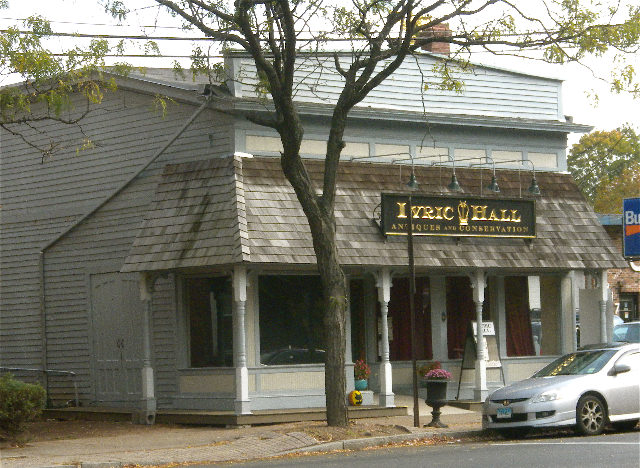
Westville Theater (1915), 827 Whalley Avenue

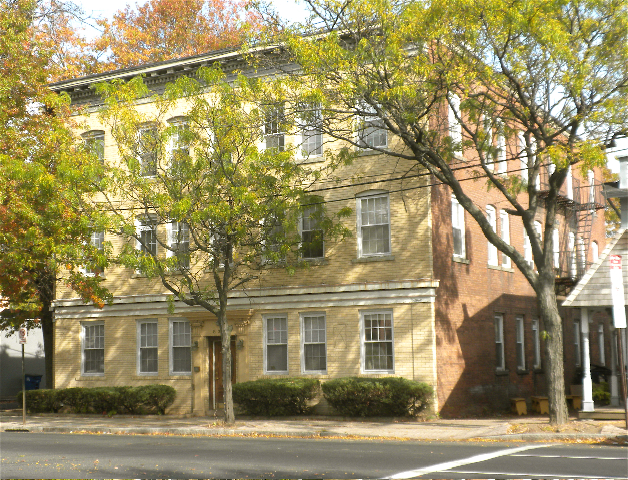
Alfred Minor Building (1906-07), 831-835 Whalley Avenue

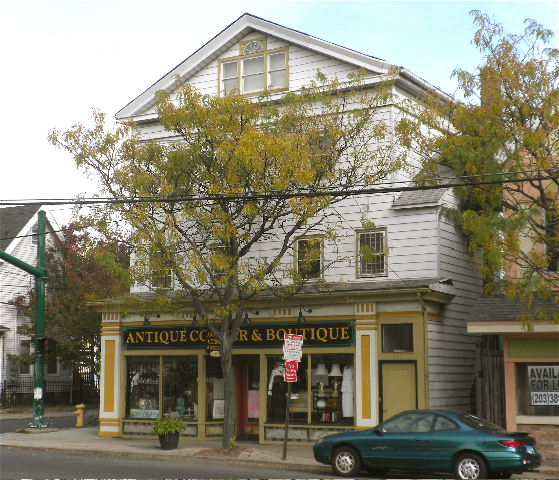
859 Whalley Avenue

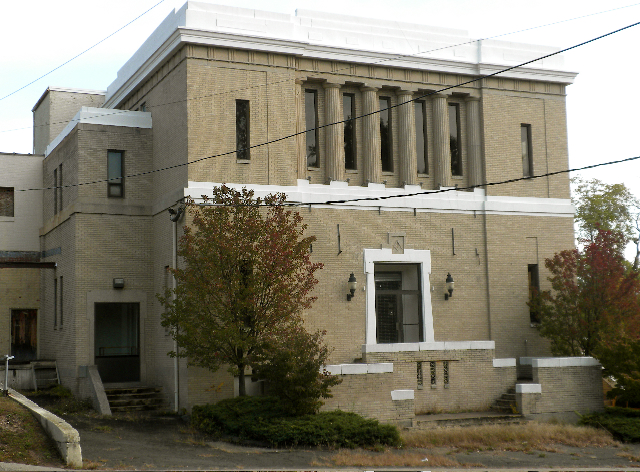
Westville Masonic Temple (1926), 949 Whalley Avenue, R. W. Foote.

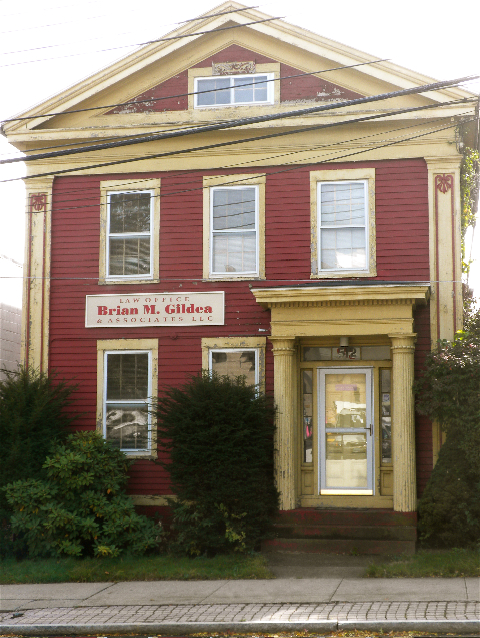
512 Blake Street (about 1840), Greek Revival.

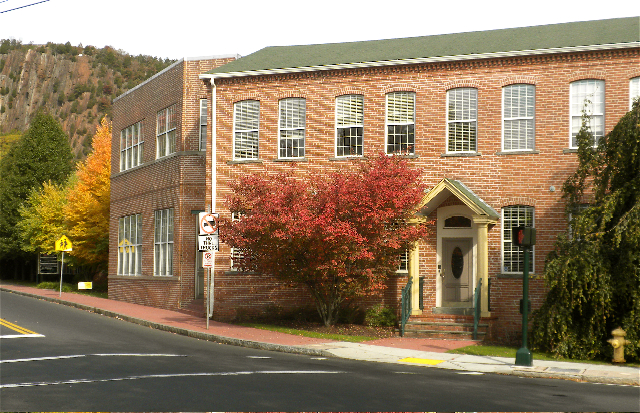
Geometric Tool Company (1906), 495 Blake Street, Brown & von Beren.

== See also ==
- National Register of Historic Places listings in New Haven, Connecticut
