= Connecticut Route 334 =

State highway in New Haven County, Connecticut, US

Route 334
- Map of New Haven County in southern Connecticut with Route 334 highlighted in red

Route information
- Maintained by CTDOT
- Length: 4.40 mi (7.08 km)
- Existed: 1963–present

Major junctions
- West end: Route 188 in Seymour
- Route 8 in Ansonia
- East end: Route 115 in Ansonia

Location
- Country: United States
- State: Connecticut
- Counties: New Haven

Highway system
- Connecticut State Highway System; Interstate; US; State; SSR; SR; Scenic
| ← Route 322 | → Route 337 |

Route 334 is a Connecticut state highway in the Naugatuck River valley, running from Seymour to Ansonia.

== Route description ==
Route 334 begins at an intersection with Route 188 near the Seymour-Oxford town line and heads southeast. As it approaches the Seymour-Derby town line, it turns northeast past the Fountain Lake Reservoir and briefly along the Seymour-Ansonia turn line before crossing into Ansonia. In Ansonia, it intersects Route 8 and turns south and southeast, crossing the Naugatuck River before ending at an intersection with Route 115 near the Ansonia railroad station.

== History ==
As part of the 1962 Route Reclassification Act, Great Hill Road in Ansonia and Seymour was taken over by the state and designated as SR 734. With the opening of the Route 8 expressway, the old surface alignment of Route 8 in Derby and Seymour was designated as SR 735 in 1960. In the 1962 Route Reclassification, most of this had been turned over to the towns. SR 735 was reconfigured to instead follow Franklin Street towards downtown Ansonia instead. Route 334 was commissioned 1963 from SR 734 and the reconfigured SR 735 and has had no significant changes since.

== Junction list ==
The entire route is in New Haven County.

| Location | mi | km | Destinations | Notes |
|---|---|---|---|---|
| Seymour | 0.00 | 0.00 | Route 188 – Derby, Oxford, Southford | Western terminus |
| Ansonia | 3.07 | 4.94 | Route 8 – Bridgeport, Waterbury | No eastbound access via Route 8 north; exit 15 on Route 8 |
| Ansonia | 4.40 | 7.08 | Route 115 – Seymour, Derby | Eastern terminus |
1.000 mi = 1.609 km; 1.000 km = 0.621 mi: Incomplete access
