= Connecticut Route 114 =

State highway in New Haven County, Connecticut, US

Route 114
- Map of New Haven County in southern Connecticut with Route 114 highlighted in red

Route information
- Maintained by CTDOT
- Length: 7.92 mi (12.75 km)
- Existed: 1932–present

Major junctions
- South end: US 1 in Orange
- East end: Route 63 in Woodbridge

Location
- Country: United States
- State: Connecticut
- Counties: New Haven

Highway system
- Connecticut State Highway System; Interstate; US; State; SSR; SR; Scenic
← Route 113	→ Route 115

Route 114 is a Connecticut state highway in the western suburbs of New Haven, running from Orange to Woodbridge. Other than at its junction with Route 63, it is signed north and south.

== Route description ==
Route 114 begins as Racebrook Road at an intersection with US 1 in Orange and heads north. It intersects with Route 34 in northern Orange 2.3 miles (3.7 km) from the south end and continues northward into the town of Woodbridge. In Woodbridge, it crosses over Route 15 (Wilbur Cross Parkway) does not have an interchange with it, then intersects with Route 243 1.1 miles (1.8 km) later and with Route 313 another 1.4 miles (2.3 km) after that. As Route 114 approaches Woodbridge center, it shifts to Center Road making a sharp right turn then crossing the Wepawaug River. Route 114 continues east for another 1.6 miles (2.6 km) before ending at an intersection with Route 63.

== History ==
Route 114 was established as part of the 1932 state highway renumbering. It originally ran in a "C" pattern within the town of Woodbridge, connecting at both ends with Route 63 (then Route 67) and serving Woodbridge center. The original route used modern Route 114 from its north end until the intersection with Route 243. Then it proceeded east along Route 243 (Ansonia Road/Fountain Street) until it met Route 63 again in the Westville neighborhood of New Haven. In 1951, the southern segment of Route 114 was relocated and extended south to its current terminus at Route 1 using former SR 442. The old alignment became an unsigned state-maintained road (part of reconfigured SR 552).

== Junction list ==
The entire route is in New Haven County.

Location	mi	km	Destinations	Notes
Orange	0.00	0.00	US 1 – New Haven, Milford	Southern terminus
Orange	2.34	3.77	Route 34 – West Haven, Derby	
Woodbridge	4.43	7.13	Route 243 – Ansonia, Westville	
Woodbridge	5.83	9.38	Route 313 – Seymour, New Haven	
Woodbridge	7.92	12.75	Route 63 – Bethany, New Haven	Eastern terminus
1.000 mi = 1.609 km; 1.000 km = 0.621 mi
