= Connecticut Route 115 =

State highway in New Haven County, Connecticut, US

Route 115
- Map of New Haven County in southern Connecticut with Route 115 highlighted in red

Route information
- Maintained by CTDOT
- Length: 5.66 mi (9.11 km)
- Existed: 1932–present

Major junctions
- South end: Route 34 in Derby
- North end: Route 67 in Seymour

Location
- Country: United States
- State: Connecticut
- Counties: New Haven

Highway system
- Connecticut State Highway System; Interstate; US; State; SSR; SR; Scenic
← Route 114	→ Route 116

Route 115 is a Connecticut state highway in the Lower Naugatuck River Valley area, running from Route 34 in Derby to Route 67 in Seymour. The road runs along the east bank of the lower Naugatuck River.

== Route description ==
Route 115 begins as Derby Avenue in Derby, continuing north from Route 34, which turns west to cross the Naugatuck River. It enters the city of Ansonia after 0.8 miles (1.3 km), becoming Main Street. At the Derby-Ansonia line, Route 115 meets the western end of Route 243 (for Woodbridge and New Haven) and its continuation across the Naugatuck River (Division Street), which provides access to shopping areas as well as the Route 8 expressway. Route 115 continues north into Ansonia center, passing by the Ansonia station of the Waterbury Branch of the Metro-North Railroad. It then meets the east end of Route 334 (Maple Avenue) and proceeds north as North Main Street, entering the town of Seymour about 1.2 miles (1.9 km) later. In Seymour, it becomes South Main Street, meeting and briefly overlapping Route 313 (for Woodbridge and New Haven) then ending 0.2 miles (0.32 km) later at an intersection with Route 67 near the Seymour railroad station.

The entire length of Route 115 is also designated as Veterans Memorial Highway.

== History ==
In the 1920s, the route through Derby, Ansonia, and Seymour on the east bank of the Naugatuck River was designated as State Highway 200. The corresponding road on the west side was New England Route 8. In the 1932 state highway renumbering, Highway 200 was renumbered to Route 115, originally running from its current southern end at Route 34 to the intersection of Main Street and Broad Street (both part of the original Route 8). In 1936, Route 8 was relocated to River Street (modern Route 313). The former Route 8 alignment became Route 8A. In 1962, Route 8A was deleted and the Main Street portion was assigned as a northern extension of Route 115.

== Junction list ==
The entire route is in New Haven County.

Location	mi	km	Destinations	Notes
Derby	0.00	0.00	Route 34 – New Haven, Newtown	Southern terminus
Ansonia	0.85	1.37	Route 243 east / Division Street (SR 853 west) – Woodbridge, New Haven	Western terminus of Route 243
Ansonia	1.69	2.72	Bridge Street (SR 727 south)	
Ansonia	1.97	3.17	Route 334 west – Seymour	Eastern terminus of Route 334
Seymour	5.30	8.53	Route 313 east – Woodbridge, New Haven	Southern end of Route 313 concurrency
Seymour	5.37	8.64	Route 313 west	Northern end of Route 313 concurrency
Seymour	5.66	9.11	Route 67 – Oxford, Woodbridge	Northern terminus
1.000 mi = 1.609 km; 1.000 km = 0.621 mi: Concurrency terminus
