= Connecticut Route 64 =

State highway in Connecticut, US

Route 64
- Map of western Connecticut with Route 64 highlighted in red

Route information
- Maintained by CTDOT
- Length: 8.14 mi (13.10 km)
- Existed: 1932–present

Major junctions
- West end: US 6 in Woodbury
- East end: I-84 in Waterbury

Location
- Country: United States
- State: Connecticut
- Counties: Litchfield, New Haven

Highway system
- Connecticut State Highway System; Interstate; US; State; SSR; SR; Scenic
| ← Route 63 | → Route 66 |

Route 64 is a Connecticut state highway connecting the towns of Woodbury and Waterbury via Middlebury.

== Route description ==
Route 64 begins as Sherman Hill Road at an intersection with US 6 in the Pomeraug section of Woodbury (just south of the town center) and heads east towards Middlebury. After crossing the town line, the road becomes Middlebury Road. Route 64 soon meets and briefly overlaps Route 188 (for about half a mile) west of Middlebury center before continuing northeast then east through the Oronoke section of Middlebury, where it intersects with Route 63 (signed for Watertown and Naugatuck). Route 64 crosses into the city of Waterbury about 0.1 mi (0.16 km) east of the Route 63 junction and becomes Chase Parkway. After another 0.2 miles (0.32 km), Route 64 leaves Chase Parkway, continuing straight onto the I-84 eastbound on ramp. The last 0.5 miles (0.80 km) of Route 64 is along the on ramp and it ends as it merges with I-84 eastbound. Chase Parkway continues east of Route 64 for another 1.6 miles (2.6 km) into Downtown Waterbury and is an unsigned state highway with designation SR 845.

== History ==
The road linking Woodbury and Waterbury was originally laid out as a toll road in May 1823 and was known as the Woodbury and Waterbury Turnpike. The Woodbury-Waterbury road was incorporated as part of New England Route 3 in 1922, which ran east–west across Connecticut and directly connected the cities of Danbury, Waterbury, Hartford, and Willimantic. In 1926, the U.S. Highway system was established and US 6 was co-signed along most of New England Route 3. For a few years between 1926 and 1929, the Woodbury to Waterbury route was signed as US 6. By 1930, US 6 was relocated to a more northerly alignment via Watertown, Thomaston, and Bristol. This left the Woodbury-Waterbury route signed only as Route 3. In the 1932 state highway renumbering, the New England Route 3 designation was deleted. Route 14 was created at the same time and incorporated the Woodbury-Waterbury route and continued eastward via Meriden, Middletown, and Willimantic to the Rhode Island state line in Sterling. In 1941, most of Route 14 (west of Willimantic) was re-designated as US 6A. In 1967, the US 6A designation was removed in Connecticut and broken into several smaller routes. Modern Route 64 is one of these routes that was created as a result of the renumbering of US 6A.

== Junction list ==
| County | Location | mi | km | Destinations | Notes |
|---|---|---|---|---|---|
| Litchfield | Woodbury | 0.00 | 0.00 | US 6 – Southbury, Watertown | Western terminus |
| New Haven | Middlebury | 4.25 | 6.84 | Route 188 south – Southford | Western end of Route 188 concurrency |
| New Haven | Middlebury | 4.79 | 7.71 | Route 188 north – Naugatuck | Eastern end of Route 188 concurrency |
| New Haven | Middlebury | 7.31 | 11.76 | Route 63 to I-84 west – Watertown, Naugatuck, Danbury | |
| New Haven | Waterbury | 7.61 | 12.25 | Chase Parkway (SR 845 east) | |
| New Haven | Waterbury | 8.14 | 13.10 | I-84 east – Hartford | Eastern terminus; exit 30 on I-84 |
1.000 mi = 1.609 km; 1.000 km = 0.621 mi
