= List of state routes in Connecticut =

State Route System
- Standard Connecticut route shields

System information
- Length: 3,719 mi (5,985 km)
- Notes: Routes are generally state-maintained. There is also a system of unsigned state highways known as state roads (SR) and special service roads (SSR). State roads maintained by the CTDOT.

Highway names
- Interstates: Interstate X (I-X)
- US Highways: U.S. Route X (US X)

System links
- Connecticut State Highway System; Interstate; US; State; SSR; SR; Scenic

The Connecticut Department of Transportation (CTDOT) maintains a system of state highways to serve the predominant flow of traffic between towns within Connecticut, and to towns in surrounding states. State highways also include roads that provide access to federal and state facilities (Special Service Roads).

The state highway system consists of roads indicated on the official CTDOT map and highway log. As of January 1, 2007, the state highway system contains a total of 3,719 miles (5,985 km) of roads (not including ramps and interchange connections), corresponding to approximately 20% of all roads in the state. All state highways are state-maintained except for several segments (totaling 4 miles) that are locally maintained. Interstate highways and U.S. highways in the state are not Connecticut state routes, however they are maintained by the state.

All state highways are given a number designation. All state highways are assigned Route numbers. Route numbers are in the 2–999 range. State highways that are special service roads are assigned SSR numbers and are unsigned; these numbers are above 399 and are used for internal CTDOT purposes. Signposted state highways that are not U.S. highways or interstates are signed with the square Connecticut state highway shield.

== State routes ==
Routes are signed state highways and are assigned numbers from 1 to 399 (with the exception of I-684 and I-691). All state, U.S. and Interstate highways are part of the same numbering system. In 1926, the U.S. highway system was implemented. U.S. Routes 1, 5, 6, and 7 were used as designations on several primary state highways, replacing New England routes 1, 2, 3, and 4, respectively. The other New England routes that were not re-designated as U.S. routes became ordinary state highways but kept their number designation, which are used even today (with some realignment). In 1958, Connecticut received approval for the route numbers of its three primary Interstate highways: I-84, I-91, and I-95. State highways with the same number designation as the Interstate highways were renumbered to avoid duplication of route numbers.

Number	Length (mi)	Length (km)	Southern or western terminus	Northern or eastern terminus	Formed	Removed	Notes
Route 2	58.03	93.39	Columbus Boulevard/State Street in Hartford	US 1 in Stonington	1932	current	
Route 2A	9.91	15.95	I-395/Route 2/Route 32 in Norwich	Route 2 in Preston	1967	current	
Route 3	14.48	23.30	Route 66 in Middletown	Route 2 in East Hartford	1941	current	Extended in 1991
Route 4	46.72	75.19	Route 41/Route 343 in Sharon	Farmington Avenue in West Hartford	1932	current	
Route 8	67.36	108.41	I-95 in Bridgeport	Route 8 at the Massachusetts state line	1922	current	Rerouted in 1951
Route 8A	1.31	2.11	US 1 in Stratford	Route 8 in Stratford	1932	1951	Now Route 110
Route 9	40.89	65.81	I-95/US 1 in Old Saybrook	I-84/US 6 in Farmington	1932	current	
Route 9A	15.4	24.8	Route 9 in Essex	Route 9 in Middletown	1968	1986	Now Route 154
Route 10	54.28	87.36	I-95 in New Haven	US 202/Route 10 at the Massachusetts state line	1922	current	
Route 10A	3.62	5.83	Whitney Avenue in New Haven	Route 10 in Hamden	1932	1970	
Route 11	7.42	11.94	Route 82 in Salem	Route 2 in Colchester	1971	current	Length includes only completed portion
Route 12	54.46	87.64	I-95/US 1/Route 184 in Groton	Route 12 at the Massachusetts state line	1922	current	
Route 14	24.33	39.16	Route 66/Route 195 in Windham	Route 14 at the Rhode Island state line	1932	current	
Route 14A	10.27	16.53	Route 14 in Plainfield	Route 14 in Sterling	1963	current	
Route 15	83.53	134.43	Hutchinson River Parkway at the New York state line	I-84/US 6 in East Hartford	1932	current	Includes Merritt Parkway, Wilbur Cross Parkway, Berlin Turnpike, and Wilbur Cross Highway; relocated in 1948
Route 15A	3.02	4.86	US 6A/Route 15 in Portland	Route 15 in Portland	1932	1948	Now Route 17A
Route 16	17.05	27.44	Route 66 in East Hampton	Route 207 in Lebanon	1934	current	Extended in 1963
Route 16A	—	—	—	—	1942	1963	ㅤ
Route 17	36.41	58.60	I-91/Route 80/Middletown Avenue in New Haven	Route 2 in Glastonbury	1948	current	
Route 17A	3.02	4.86	Route 17/Route 66 in Portland	Route 17 in Portland	1948	current	
Route 18	2.23	3.59	Route 72 in Cromwell	Route 9 in Cromwell	1940	1951	Now Route 372
Route 19	6.99	11.25	Route 190 in Stafford	Route 19 at the Massachusetts state line	1932	current	
Route 20	31.56	50.79	Route 8 in Winchester	I-91 in Windsor Locks	1932	current	Includes part of Bradley Airport Connector
Route 21	5.67	9.12	Route 12 in Killingly	Route 193 in Thompson	1944	current	
Route 22	14.07	22.64	Route 10/Route 40 in Hamden	US 1 in Guilford	1951	current	
Route 25	28.59	46.01	I-95 in Bridgeport	US 202 in Brookfield	1932	current	
Route 25A	—	—	—	—	1932	1933	Now part of Route 25
Route 27	3.21	5.17	US 1 in Stonington	Route 184 in Groton	1950	current	
Route 29	9.41	15.14	US 1 in Darien	Westchester Avenue at the New York state line	1932	1966	Renumbered Route 124 to match New York
Route 30	20.94	33.70	I-291/US 5 in South Windsor	Route 190 in Stafford	1943	current	
Route 31	14.34	23.08	Route 32 in Mansfield	Route 74 in Vernon	1942	current	Extended in 1963
Route 32	54.88	88.32	I-95/US 1/Eugene O'Neill Drive in New London	Route 32 at the Massachusetts state line	1922	current	Realigned in 1932
Route 33	14.41	23.19	I-95/Route 136 in Westport	Route 35 in Ridgefield	1932	current	
Route 34	21.88	35.21	Washington Avenue in Newtown	Route 10 in New Haven	1932	current	Removed from the Oak Street Connector in 2023
Route 35	5.66	9.11	NY 35 at the New York state line	US 7 in Ridgefield	1932	current	
Route 35A	1.02	1.64	West Lane at the New York state line	Route 35 in Ridgefield	1933	1963	Replaced by unsigned SR 835
Route 37	18.66	30.03	I-84/US 6/US 7/US 202/Route 39/Route 53 in Danbury	US 7 in New Milford	1932	current	
Route 39	22.76	36.63	I-84/US 6/US 7/US 202/Route 37/Route 53 in Danbury	Route 55 in Sherman	1932	current	
Route 40	3.08	4.96	I-91/Bailey Road in North Haven	Route 10/Route 22 in Hamden	1976	current	
Route 41	17.86	28.74	CR 2 at the New York state line	Route 41 at the Massachusetts state line	1932	current	
Route 42	13.66	21.98	Route 67 in Oxford	Route 10 in Cheshire	1963	current	
Route 43	5.06	8.14	Route 4/Route 128 in Cornwall	Route 63 in Cornwall	1932	current	
Route 45	10.29	16.56	US 202 in Washington	US 7 in Cornwall	1932	current	
Route 47	12.27	19.75	US 6 in Woodbury	US 202 in Washington	1932	current	
Route 49	17.96	28.90	Route 4 in Torrington	Norfolk Road at the Massachusetts state line	1932	1954	Replaced by extended Route 72; this road became Route 272 in 1963
Route 49	21.74	34.99	Route 2 in Stonington	Route 14A in Sterling	1959	current	
Route 51	9.4	15.1	Route 156 in Old Lyme	I-95/US 1 in East Lyme	1962	1976	Former route of US 1, replaced by US 1 again when it was rerouted off of I-95
Route 52	54.69	88.02	I-95 in Waterford	Route 52 at the Massachusetts state line	1964	1983	Replaced by I-395 when it was rerouted off of I-95
Route 53	23.57	37.93	US 1 in Norwalk	I-84/US 6/US 7/US 202/Route 37/Route 39 in Danbury	1932	current	
Route 55	2.64	4.25	NY 55 at the New York state line	US 7 in New Milford	1932	current	
Route 57	9.51	15.30	Route 33 in Westport	US 7 in Georgetown	1932	current	
Route 58	18.58	29.90	US 1 in Fairfield	Route 302 in Bethel	1932	current	
Route 58A	1.23	1.98	—	—	1932	1935	Renumbered US 202A in 1935
Route 59	12.05	19.39	US 1 in Bridgeport	Route 25 in Monroe	1932	current	
Route 61	9.16	14.74	US 6 in Woodbury	Route 63 in Morris	1932	current	
Route 63	52.57	84.60	Route 10 in New Haven	US 7 in Canaan	1932	current	
Route 64	8.14	13.10	US 6 in Woodbury	I-84 in Waterbury	1932	current	
Route 65	9.66	15.55	US 1 in Bridgeport	Route 8 in Shelton	1932	1951	Redesignated as part of a rerouted Route 8 in 1951
Route 65A	2.91	4.68	Route 65 in Trumbull	Route 65 in Shelton	1944	1951	Now Route 108
Route 66	38.38	61.77	I-91/I-691 in Meriden	US 6 in Windham	1968	current	
Route 67	31.00	49.89	Route 63 in Woodbridge	US 7/US 202 in New Milford	1932	current	
Route 67A	1.20	1.93	Route 133 in Bridgewater	Route 67 in Bridgewater	1959	1963	Replaced by unsigned SR 867
Route 68	22.09	35.55	Route 63 in Naugatuck	Route 17 in Durham	1932	current	
Route 69	35.16	56.58	Route 63 in New Haven	Route 4 in Burlington	1932	current	
Route 70	10.92	17.57	I-84 in Cheshire	Route 71 in Meriden	1932	current	
Route 71	19.19	30.88	US 5 in Wallingford	Route 173 in West Hartford	1932	current	
Route 71A	2.92	4.70	Route 71 in Berlin	Kensington Avenue in New Britain	1978	current	
Route 72	20.05	32.27	Route 4 in Harwinton	Route 9/Route 71/Route 174 in New Britain	1932	current	
Route 73	3.46	5.57	Route 63 in Watertown	Route 8 in Waterbury	1932	current	
Route 74	22.21	35.74	Route 194 in South Windsor	US 44 in Ashford	1932	current	
Route 75	13.52	21.76	Route 159/Route 305 in Windsor	Route 75 at the Massachusetts state line	1932	current	
Route 76	—	—	—	—	—	1951	
Route 77	13.85	22.29	Route 146 in Guilford	Route 17 in Durham	1932	current	
Route 78	—	—	—	—	1935	1951	
Route 78	0.43	0.69	Route 2 in Stonington	Route 78 at the Rhode Island state line	1979	current	
Route 79	14.34	23.08	US 1 in Madison	Route 17 in Durham	1932	current	
Route 80	25.91	41.70	I-91/Route 17 in New Haven	Route 154 in Deep River	1932	current	
Route 81	15.75	25.35	US 1 in Clinton	Route 154 in Haddam	1932	current	
Route 82	28.47	45.82	Route 9 in Chester	Route 2/Route 32 in Norwich	1932	current	
Route 83	27.56	44.35	New London Turnpike in Glastonbury	Route 83 at the Massachusetts state line	1932	current	
Route 84	—	—	—	—	—	1959	Renumbered Route 95, and is now Route 184 because of I-84
Route 85	37.38	60.16	US 1 in New London	US 6/US 44 in Bolton	1932	current	
Route 86	—	—	—	—	—	1951	Replaced by an extended Route 156
Route 87	16.62	26.75	Route 32 in Franklin	US 6 in Andover	1932	current	
Route 89	16.25	26.15	Route 195 in Mansfield	Route 190 in Union	1932	current	
Route 91	—	—	—	—	1932	1959	Renumbered Route 171 to avoid confusion with I-91
Route 93	—	—	—	—	1932	1959	
Route 94	9.33	15.02	Route 2 in Glastonbury	Route 85 in Hebron	1932	current	
Route 95	—	—	—	—	1932	1959	Renumbered Route 49 because of I-95
Route 95	—	—	—	—	1959	1964	Renumbered Route 184
Route 95A	—	—	—	—	—	1959	Renumbered Route 14
Route 97	29.14	46.90	Route 12 in Norwich	US 44/Route 169 in Pomfret	1932	current	
Route 99	10.64	17.12	Route 9 in Cromwell	US 5/Route 15/Wethersfield Avenue in Wethersfield	1969	current	
Route 100	—	—	—	—	1932	1934	Replaced by Route 39 and Route 37A (now also Route 39)
Route 100	4.40	7.08	US 1 in East Haven	Route 80 in East Haven	1935	current	
Route 101	—	—	—	—	—	1935	Replaced by US 44
Route 101	9.46	15.22	US 44 in Pomfret	Route 101 at the Rhode Island state line	1935	current	
Route 102	3.45	5.55	Route 35 in Ridgefield	US 7 in Ridgefield	1932	current	
Route 103	—	—	—	—	1932	1963	Replaced by Route 53
Route 103	5.31	8.55	Route 80 in New Haven	US 5/Route 22 in North Haven	1987	current	
Route 104	6.82	10.98	Route 137 in Stamford	Long Ridge Road at the New York state line	1932	current	
Route 105	—	—	—	—	1932	1963	Now Route 190
Route 106	—	—	Route 58 near Easton	Route 59 near Easton	1932	1963	Center Street; decommissioned in exchange for creating the current Route 106
Route 106	14.37	23.13	I-95/US 1 in Stamford	Route 53 in Wilton	1963	current	
Route 107	7.50	12.07	US 7 in Georgetown	Route 58 in Redding	1932	current	
Route 108	11.05	17.78	US 1 in Stratford	Route 110 in Shelton	1932	current	
Route 109	20.93	33.68	US 202 in New Milford	US 6 in Thomaston	1932	current	
Route 110	15.95	25.67	I-95/US 1/Route 130 in Stratford	Route 111 in Monroe	1932	current	Extended in 1952
Route 111	11.71	18.85	Route 15/Merritt Parkway in Trumbull	Route 34 in Monroe	1932	current	
Route 112	6.68	10.75	US 44 in Salisbury	US 7 in Salisbury	1932	current	
Route 113	8.12	13.07	I-95 at the Bridgeport–Stratford line	Route 110 in Stratford	1932	current	
Route 114	7.92	12.75	US 1 in Orange	Route 63 in Woodbridge	1932	current	
Route 115	5.66	9.11	Route 34 in Derby	Route 67 in Seymour	1932	current	
Route 116	—	—	—	—	1932	1967	Renumbered Route 118 so that Route 116 could be reused to match New York
Route 116	4.24	6.82	Route 35 in Ridgefield	NY 116 at the New York state line	1966	current	
Route 117	—	—	—	—	1932	1954	Replaced by Route 72
Route 117	11.32	18.22	US 1 in Groton	Route 2 in Preston	1963	current	
Route 118	—	—	—	—	1932	1962	
Route 118	7.48	12.04	Route 63 in Litchfield	Route 4 in Harwinton	1966	current	Route 116 designation from 1932-1967
Route 119	—	—	—	—	1932	1934	Replaced by Route 69
Route 119	—	—	—	—	1935	1963	Replaced by Route 201 and SR 627
Route 120	3.11	5.01	Route 322 in Southington	Route 10 in Southington	1932	current	
NY 120A	4.6	7.4	NY 120A at the New York state line	NY 120A at the New York state line	1931	current	King St, Greenwich ... parts in CT and other parts along NY/CT line
Route 121	5.66	9.11	US 1 in Milford	Route 34 in Orange	1932	current	
Route 122	3.51	5.65	I-95 in West Haven	Route 63 in New Haven	1932	current	
Route 123	8.37	13.47	US 1 in Norwalk	NY 123 at the New York state line	1932	current	realigned in 1934
Route 124	—	—	—	—	1932	1963	Demoted to SR 832 and SR 834
Route 124	9.41	15.14	US 1 in Darien	Westchester Avenue at the New York state line	1966	current	
Route 125	1.24	2.00	Route 4 in Cornwall	Route 128 in Cornwall	1932	current	
Route 126	6.08	9.78	Route 63 in Canaan	US 44 in North Canaan	1932	current	
Route 127	6.80	10.94	I-95/Route 130 in Bridgeport	Route 111 in Trumbull	1932	current	
Route 128	4.03	6.49	US 7 in Sharon	Route 4/Route 43 in Cornwall	1932	current	
Route 129	—	—	—	—	1932	1963	
Route 130	—	—	—	—	1932	1963	
Route 130	8.21	13.21	US 1 in Fairfield	I-95/US 1/Route 110 in Stratford	1992	current	
Route 131	—	—	—	—	1932	1935	Renumbered Route 199 so that Route 131 could be used to match Massachusetts
Route 131	3.78	6.08	Route 12 in Thompson	Route 131 at the Massachusetts state line	1935	current	
Route 132	10.97	17.65	Route 47 in Woodbury	Route 63 in Watertown	1932	current	
Route 133	20.05	32.27	US 202 in Brookfield	Route 67 in Bridgewater	1932	current	
Route 134	—	—	—	—	1932	1963	Decommissioned in 1956, but restored in 1961; replaced by rerouted Route 109
Route 135	—	—	—	—	1932	1943	
Route 135	2.58	4.15	I-95/US 1 in Fairfield	Route 58 in Fairfield	1953	current	
Route 136	20.46	32.93	US 1 in Darien	Route 59 in Easton	1932	current	
Route 137	9.33	15.02	US 1 in Stamford	NY 137 at the New York state line	1932	current	
Route 138	17.73	28.53	Route 97 in Sprague	Route 138 at the Rhode Island state line	1932	current	
Route 139	2.38	3.83	US 1 in Branford	Route 22/Route 80 in North Branford	1932	current	
Route 139A	—	—	—	—	1932	1964	the last highway log to show this road was the 1948 highway log
Route 140	22.50	36.21	Route 75 in Windsor Locks	Route 32/Route 190 in Stafford	1932	current	
Route 141	—	—	—	—	1932	1951	Now Route 22
Route 142	4.27	6.87	US 1 in East Haven	US 1/Route 146 in Branford	1932	current	
Route 143	—	—	—	—	1932	1962	Now Route 146, which had the old route on Leetes Island Road cancelled.
Route 144	—	—	—	—	1932	1962	Now partially Route 80
Route 145	9.91	15.95	US 1 in Clinton	Route 148 in Chester	1932	current	
Route 146	13.00	20.92	US 1/Route 142 in Branford	US 1 in Guilford	1932	current	
Route 147	5.09	8.19	Route 17 in Durham	Route 66 in Middlefield	1932	current	
Route 148	16.35	26.31	Route 79 in Killingworth	Route 82 in Lyme	1932	current	
Route 149	11.70	18.83	Route 82 in East Haddam	Route 2/Old Hartford Road in Colchester	1932	current	
Route 150	9.04	14.55	Route 22 in North Branford	US 5 in Wallingford	1932	current	Extended in 1962
Route 151	10.77	17.33	Route 82 in East Haddam	Route 66 in East Hampton	1932	current	
Route 152	3.31	5.33	US 1 in Orange	Route 34 in Orange	1932	current	
Route 153	5.27	8.48	US 1 in Westbrook	Route 9/Route 154 in Essex	1932	current	
Route 154	28.24	45.45	US 1 in Old Saybrook	Route 9 in Higganum	1932	current	
Route 155	2.22	3.57	Route 17 in Middletown	Route 9/Randolph Road in Middletown	1933	current	
Route 156	22.76	36.63	Route 82 in East Haddam	US 1 in Waterford	1932	current	
Route 156A	—	—	—	—	—	1961	
Route 157	6.86	11.04	Route 68 in Durham	Route 66 in Middletown	1932	current	
Route 158	—	—	—	—	1932	1950	Replaced by Route 122
Route 159	—	—	—	—	1932	1963	
Route 159	16.82	27.07	Main Street at the Hartford–Windsor town line	Route 159 at the Massachusetts state line	1968	current	formerly US-5A
Route 160	7.36	11.84	US 5/Route 15/Berlin Turnpike in Berlin	Route 17 in Glastonbury	1932	current	
Route 161	8.03	12.92	Route 156 in East Lyme	Route 85 in Montville	1932	current	
Route 162	20.05	32.27	US 1 in Milford	US 1 in Orange	1932	current	
Route 163	12.86	20.70	Route 32 in Montville	Route 2 in Bozrah	1932	current	
Route 164	7.83	12.60	Route 2 in Preston	Route 138 in Griswold	1932	current	
Route 165	16.01	25.77	Route 2 in Norwich	Route 165 at the Rhode Island state line	1932	current	
Route 166	1.62	2.61	Route 153 in Westbrook	US 1 in Old Saybrook	1935	current	
Route 167	10.41	16.75	Route 4 in Farmington	US 202/Route 10 in Simsbury	1932	current	
Route 168	—	—	—	—	1932	1951	Replaced by Route 22
Route 168	7.93	12.76	Route 168 at the Massachusetts state line	Route 75 in Suffield	1977	current	Former portion of Route 190 renumbered because of I-190 in Massachusetts
Route 169	—	—	—	—	1932	1951	Replaced by Route 27 (part now Route 117)
Route 169	38.25	61.56	Route 2/Route 32 in Norwich	Route 169 at the Massachusetts state line	1959	current	
Route 171	—	—	—	—	1932	1941	
Route 171	20.70	33.31	I-84 in Union	US 44/Route 12 in Putnam	1959	current	
Route 172	4.45	7.16	I-84/US 6 in Southbury	Route 67 in Southbury	1932	current	
Route 173	6.17	9.93	US 5/Route 15/Berlin Turnpike in Newington	I-84/US 6/South Main Street in West Hartford	1932	current	
Route 174	3.18	5.12	Route 9/Route 71/Route 72 in New Britain	Route 176 in Newington	1932	current	
Route 175	6.19	9.96	Route 71 in New Britain	Route 99 in Wethersfield	1932	current	
Route 176	4.14	6.66	US 5/Route 15/Berlin Turnpike in Newington	Newington Avenue at the Newington–Hartford line	1932	current	
Route 177	12.57	20.23	Route 10 in Plainville	US 44/US 202 in Canton	1932	current	
Route 178	6.89	11.09	Route 185 in Bloomfield	Route 159 in Windsor	1932	current	
Route 179	16.50	26.55	Route 4 in Burlington	Route 20 in Hartland	1932	current	
Route 180	—	—	—	—	1932	1935	Proposed but never built, Now Route 68
Route 181	7.84	12.62	US 44 in Barkhamsted	Route 20 in Hartland	1932	current	
Route 182	3.81	6.13	US 44 in Norfolk	Route 182A/Route 183 in Colebrook	1932	current	
Route 182A	2.09	3.36	Route 182 in Colebrook	Route 182/Route 183 in Colebrook	1941	current	
Route 183	19.06	30.67	Route 4 in Torrington	Route 183 at the Massachusetts state line	1932	current	
Route 184	—	—	—	—	1932	1963	Partially replaced by Route 187 and Route 178
Route 184	15.66	25.20	I-95/US 1/Route 12 in Groton	I-95/Route 216 in North Stonington	1964	current	
Route 185	6.36	10.24	US 202/Route 10 in Simsbury	Route 189 in West Hartford	1932	current	
Route 186	3.57	5.75	Route 190 in Somers	Route 186 at the Massachusetts state line	1932	current	
Route 187	19.74	31.77	US 44 in Hartford	Route 187 at the Massachusetts state line	1932	current	
Route 188	15.92	25.62	Route 34 in Seymour	Route 63 in Middlebury	1935	current	
Route 189	20.32	32.70	US 44 in Hartford	Route 189 at the Massachusetts state line	1932	current	
Route 190	28.27	45.50	Route 75 in Suffield	Route 171 in Union	1932	current	
Route 191	9.30	14.97	US 5 in East Windsor	Route 190 in Enfield	1932	current	
Route 192	3.49	5.62	Route 190 in Enfield	Route 192 at the Massachusetts state line	1932	current	
Route 193	6.63	10.67	Route 12 in Thompson	Route 193 at the Massachusetts state line	1932	current	
Route 194	3.67	5.91	US 5 in South Windsor	Route 30 in South Windsor	1932	current	
Route 195	15.91	25.60	Route 66 in Windham	Route 74 in Tolland	1932	current	
Route 196	5.38	8.66	Route 151 in Haddam	Route 66 in East Hampton	1932	current	
Route 197	10.97	17.65	Route 171 in Union	Route 197 at the Massachusetts state line	1932	current	
Route 198	19.22	30.93	US 6 in Chaplin	Route 198 at the Massachusetts state line	1932	current	
Route 199	—	—	—	—	1932	1935	Replaced by US 44
Route 199	4.62	7.44	Route 67 in Roxbury	Route 47 in Washington	1935	current	
Route 200	1.87	3.01	Route 12 in Thompson	Route 193 in Thompson	1932	current	
Route 201	—	—	—	—	1932	1934	Replaced by Route 97
Route 201	20.10	32.35	Route 184 in Stonington	Route 12 in Griswold	1934	current	
Route 202	—	—	—	—	1932	1935	Renumbered Route 101 because of US 202
Route 203	5.32	8.56	Route 32 in Windham	US 6 in Windham	1932	current	
Route 205	3.81	6.13	Route 12 in Plainfield	Route 169 in Brooklyn	1932	current	
Route 207	16.01	25.77	Route 85 in Hebron	Route 97 in Sprague	1932	current	
Route 209	2.93	4.72	Route 109 in Morris	US 202 in Litchfield	1963	current	
Route 211	—	—	—	—	1932	1950	Now Route 14
Route 213	6.66	10.72	Route 156 in Waterford	US 1 in New London	1932	current	
Route 214	7.30	11.75	Route 12 in Ledyard	Route 2 in Ledyard	1963	current	
Route 215	4.65	7.48	US 1 in Groton	US 1 in Groton	1932	current	
Route 216	2.78	4.47	Route 49 in North Stonington	Route 216 at the Rhode Island state line	1934	current	
Route 217	3.84	6.18	Route 66 in Middlefield	Route 372 in Cromwell	1935	current	
Route 218	7.00	11.27	US 44 in West Hartford	I-291/Route 159 in Windsor	1935	current	
Route 219	14.98	24.11	US 202 in New Hartford	Route 20 in Granby	1935	current	
Route 220	5.80	9.33	US 5 in Enfield	Route 220 at the Massachusetts state line	1936	current	
Route 222	8.08	13.00	US 6/Route 8 in Thomaston	Route 118 in Harwinton	1963	current	
Route 229	5.94	9.56	I-84 in Southington	US 6 in Bristol	1963	current	
Route 234	6.95	11.18	Route 27 in Stonington	US 1 in Stonington	1987	current	
Route 243	6.70	10.78	Route 115 in Ansonia	Route 63 in New Haven	1963	current	
Route 244	5.72	9.21	Route 198 in Eastford	Route 97 in Pomfret	1988	current	
Route 254	8.41	13.53	US 6/Route 8 in Thomaston	Route 118 in Litchfield	1963	current	
Route 262	9.37	15.08	US 6 in Watertown	US 6 in Plymouth	1963	current	
Route 263	6.23	10.03	Route 272 in Goshen	US 44/Route 183 in Winchester	1963	current	
Route 272	17.97	28.92	Route 4 in Torrington	Norfolk Road at the Massachusetts state line	1963	current	
Route 275	4.15	6.68	Route 31 in Coventry	Route 195 in Mansfield	1963	current	
Route 286	3.60	5.79	Route 74 in Ellington	Route 83 in Ellington	1963	current	
Route 287	3.36	5.41	Route 176 in Newington	Route 3 in Wethersfield	1970	current	
Route 289	5.13	8.26	Route 87 in Lebanon	Route 32 in Windham	1964	current	
Route 291	—	—	—	—	1958	1994	Now I-291
Route 302	7.96	12.81	Route 53 in Bethel	Route 25 in Newtown	1974	current	
Route 305	3.42	5.50	Route 187 in Bloomfield	Route 75 in Windsor	1963	current	
Route 309	4.74	7.63	Route 179 in Canton	Route 167 in Simsbury	1963	current	
Route 313	6.85	11.02	Route 8/Route 67 in Seymour	Route 243 in Woodbridge	1963	current	
Route 314	2.07	3.33	US 5/Route 15/Berlin Turnpike in Wethersfield	Route 99 in Wethersfield	1963	current	
Route 315	1.95	3.14	US 202/Route 10 in Simsbury	Route 189 in Simsbury	1963	current	
Route 316	6.04	9.72	Route 66 in Hebron	US 6 in Andover	1963	current	
Route 317	6.10	9.82	Route 67 in Roxbury	US 6 in Woodbury	1964	current	
Route 318	3.14	5.05	US 44 in Barkhamsted	Route 219 in Barkhamsted	1963	current	
Route 319	2.83	4.55	Route 190 in Stafford	Route 19 in Stafford	1988	current	
Route 320	7.05	11.35	Route 195 in Mansfield	I-84 in Willington	1963	current	
Route 322	9.80	15.77	Route 69 in Wolcott	I-691 in Southington	1963	current	
Route 334	4.40	7.08	Route 188 in Seymour	Route 115 in Ansonia	1963	current	
Route 337	4.91	7.90	I-95/US 1 in New Haven	Route 142 in East Haven	1987	current	
Route 341	15.97	25.70	CR 3 at the New York state line	US 202 in Washington	1932	current	
Route 343	1.50	2.41	NY 343 at the New York state line	Route 4/Route 41 in Sharon	1932	current	
Route 349	4.17	6.71	Shennecossett Road in Groton	I-95/US 1 in Groton	1985	current	
Route 354	7.37	11.86	Route 85 in Colchester	Route 82 in Salem	1963	current	
Route 361	3.54	5.70	Route 41 in Sharon	CR 62 at the New York state line	1966	current	
Route 364	4.56	7.34	Route 120 in Southington	Route 71 in Berlin	1964	current	
Route 372	15.12	24.33	Route 72/East Main Street in Plainville	Route 99 in Cromwell	1978	current	

== Special service roads ==
Roads classified by the Department of Transportation as special service roads are given an unsigned number designation between 400 and 499. Special service roads are roads that connect a federal or state facility (including state parks and some Interstate Highway interchanges) to a signed state route. These numbers only appear in internal documentation, none of them are signed.

== State roads ==
State Roads are state-maintained roads that are usually long entrance/exit ramps to/from an expressway, or short interconnecting roads between signed routes. Roads classified by the Department of Transportation as state roads are given an unsigned number designation between 500 and 999. The first digit denotes which Maintenance District the road is mainly located in:

- 500–599: District 1: Greater Hartford
- 600–699: District 2: Quiet Corner, Lower Connecticut River Valley, Southeastern Connecticut
- 700–799: District 3: Southwestern Connecticut, Greater New Haven
- 800–899: District 4: Naugatuck River Valley, Greater Danbury, Northwestern Connecticut
- 900–999: Statewide; very short routes

State road numbers are only for internal record-keeping and documentation, all of these roads are unsigned.

== History ==
=== 1913 trunk line system ===
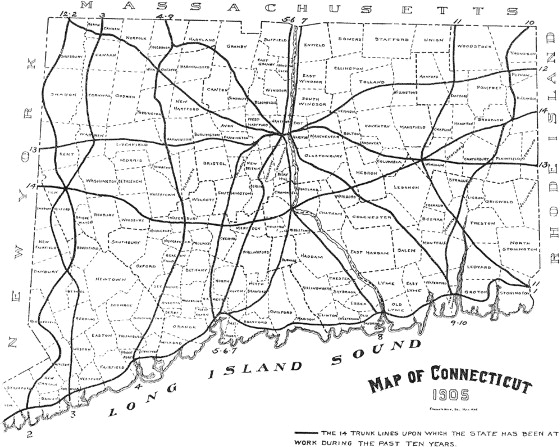
The 14 trunk line routes of the original state highway system of Connecticut

In 1900, the State Highway Department proposed a statewide system of trunk line routes. By 1913, the system consisted of 10 north-south highways and 4 east-west highways, including the lower Boston Post Road. The system covered roughly 1,400 miles (2,300 km). The 14 trunk lines were numbered on paper but were never actually signposted. The 14 trunk line routes were:

- Route 1: east-west from Greenwich to Stonington, roughly modern U.S. Route 1
- Route 2: north-south from Stamford to Salisbury, roughly modern Route 106, Route 33, Route 35, U.S. Route 7, Route 341, Route 41
- Route 3: north-south from Norwalk to North Canaan, roughly modern U.S. Route 7, Route 107, Route 53, Route 37, U.S. Route 202, Route 45, U.S. Route 7
- Route 4: north-south from Bridgeport to Colebrook, roughly modern Route 8
- Route 5: north-south from New Haven to Suffield via Cheshire (concurrent with Route 6 north of Hartford), roughly modern Route 10, Route 4, Route 159
- Route 6: north-south from New Haven to Suffield via Meriden (concurrent with Route 5 north of Hartford), roughly modern U.S. Route 5, Route 71, Route 159
- Route 7: north-south from New Haven to Enfield via Middletown, roughly modern Route 17, Route 99, U.S. Route 5
- Route 8: north-south from Old Saybrook to Hartford, roughly modern Route 9, Route 99
- Route 9: north-south from New London to Colebrook, roughly modern Route 85, Route 2, Route 189, Route 20
- Route 10: north-south from New London to Thompson, roughly modern Route 32, Route 169, Route 12, Route 193
- Route 11: north-south from Stonington to Woodstock, roughly modern Route 2, Route 32, U.S. Route 6, Route 198
- Route 12: east-west from Salisbury to Putnam, roughly Twin Lakes Road, modern U.S. Route 44
- Route 13: east-west from Kent to Sterling, roughly modern Route 341, U.S. Route 202, Route 118, Route 4, U.S. Route 6, Route 14
- Route 14: east-west from Sherman to Killingly, roughly Route 37, Route 67, Route 317, Route 64, Route 322, Route 66, U.S. Route 6

=== New England road marking system ===
The first public route numbering came with the advent of the New England road marking system of 1922. This highway numbering system was used throughout New England and consisted of 25 routes (with route numbers from 1 to 32). A total of 9 of the routes passed through Connecticut (Routes 1, 2, 3, 4, 8, 10, 12, 17, and 32). In this system, inter-state routes would be numbered 1–99 and state routes numbered 100 and up. The New England route system was soon eclipsed by the national U.S. highway system.

=== 1922–1931 ===
The State Highway Department classified state roads as either State Highways (SH) or State Aid Roads (SA). These roads were given number designations – 100–299 for primary routes and 300+ for secondary routes. Some state roads were signposted and some were not.

=== 1932 renumbering ===
The state abandoned its old numbering system and renumbered almost all of their state highways in 1932. Most of the present route numbers were formed during this renumbering. The only route numbers that survived were U.S. Routes and a few state highway routes. For route numbers established in 1932, the new numbering system used odd numbers for north-south routes and even numbers for east-west routes, matching the U.S. Highway numbering system. The New England routes that were grandfathered into the highway system (Routes 8, 10, 12, 32) did not follow the new system. The state also assigned new route numbers in clusters, with routes in the same general location having numbers close to each other as well. Shortly after the renumbering, in 1935, two new U.S. Routes were commissioned: US 44 (taking over part of old New England Route 17) and US 202.

=== 1963 renumbering ===
In 1963, the state passed the Road Reclassification Act to fix the by now fragmented state highway system. Many state highways had state maintenance gaps and several highway segments were even isolated from the rest of the system. State highways were classified into primary, secondary, and service roads. Primary routes were essentially left unchanged, while minor realignments, additions/deletions, and extensions occurred in many secondary routes. About 1/3 of all routes were changed to some degree by this renumbering. The current system of unsigned ("secret") routes, including the special service roads, was also created during this renumbering. The state highway system has not had any major changes since then. The state completely abandoned the odd/even numbering scheme established in 1932 with new numbers in 1963 assigned without regard to their direction or general location.

== See also ==
- List of crossings of the Connecticut River
- New England Interstate Routes
- Numbered highways in the United States
