= Connecticut Route 122 =

State highway in New Haven County, Connecticut, US

Route 122
- Map of New Haven County in southern Connecticut with Route 122 highlighted in red

Route information
- Maintained by CTDOT
- Length: 3.51 mi (5.65 km)
- Existed: 1932 (truncated 1966)–present

Major junctions
- South end: I-95 in West Haven
- US 1 in West Haven
- North end: Route 63 in New Haven

Location
- Country: United States
- State: Connecticut
- Counties: New Haven

Highway system
- Connecticut State Highway System; Interstate; US; State; SSR; SR; Scenic
← Route 121	→ Route 123

Route 122 is a primary, minor arterial highway in Connecticut. It runs from Interstate 95 (I-95) in West Haven north to Route 63 in New Haven. Route 122 is 3.51 miles (5.65 km) long.

== Route description ==
Route 122 officially begins as First Avenue in West Haven at the end of the southbound exit 45 ramp on I-95 heading north. First Avenue continues south of the interchange as an unsigned state highway (SR 745). First Avenue ends at Campbell Avenue in the Allingtown section of West Haven while Route 122 continues north on Campbell Avenue. The road passes by the University of New Haven, crosses U.S. Route 1 (US 1) at diagonal four-corners involving two sets of traffic lights, then continues north as Forest Road. Forest Road travels for another 2.4 miles (3.9 km) following the line of the West River. Along the way it intersects Route 34 (Derby Turnpike) and enters the Westville neighborhood of New Haven. Forest Road ends at Route 243 (Fountain Street). Route 122 jogs left and right, continuing north on Dayton Street for another block until its end at Route 63 (Whalley Avenue).

== History ==
In the 1920s, old State Highway 337 ran from US 1 in downtown Milford via Woodmont and West Haven center, ending at Campbell Avenue in the Allingtown section of West Haven. The old route went along current Route 162 to Ocean Avenue, then ran along the West Haven shoreline to First Avenue, then north along First Avenue. In the 1932 state highway renumbering, old Highway 337 was renumbered to Route 122. Route 158 was also established in 1932 and ran along Campbell Avenue and Forest Road from West Haven center (Campbell Avenue and Main Street) to Westville (Forest Road and Fountain Street). In 1950, the Route 158 designation was removed and the portion north of First Avenue was added as a northward extension of Route 122. The portion of former Route 158 south of First Avenue was transferred to the town. In 1962, Route 122 was extended north to Whalley Avenue (Route 63) along Dayton Street. In 1966, the south end of Route 122 was truncated to end at I-95, while Route 162 was extended along the Milford portion of Route 122.

== Junction list ==
The entire route is in New Haven County.

Location	mi	km	Destinations	Notes
West Haven	0.00	0.00	First Avenue (SR 745 east)	Continuation east
West Haven	0.00	0.00	I-95 north – New Haven	Exit 45 on I-95 south
West Haven	0.91	1.46	US 1 – Orange, New Haven	
West Haven	1.97	3.17	Route 34 – Orange, New Haven	
New Haven	3.38	5.44	Route 243 – Ansonia, New Haven	
New Haven	3.51	5.65	Route 63 – Woodbridge, New Haven	Northern terminus
1.000 mi = 1.609 km; 1.000 km = 0.621 mi

== State Road 745 ==
State Road 745 (SR 745) is a 1.21-mile (1.95 km), unsigned state highway that begins at I-95 in West Haven, at the southern end of Route 122. It runs south as First Avenue, then turns east at Elm Street. After crossing the West River into New Haven, the road becomes Kimberly Avenue and has an interchange with I-95 at exit 44. SR 745 ends at Route 10 (Ella T. Grasso Boulevard).
