= Woodbridge Green Historic District =

Historic district in Connecticut, United States

- U.S. National Register of Historic Places
- U.S. Historic district
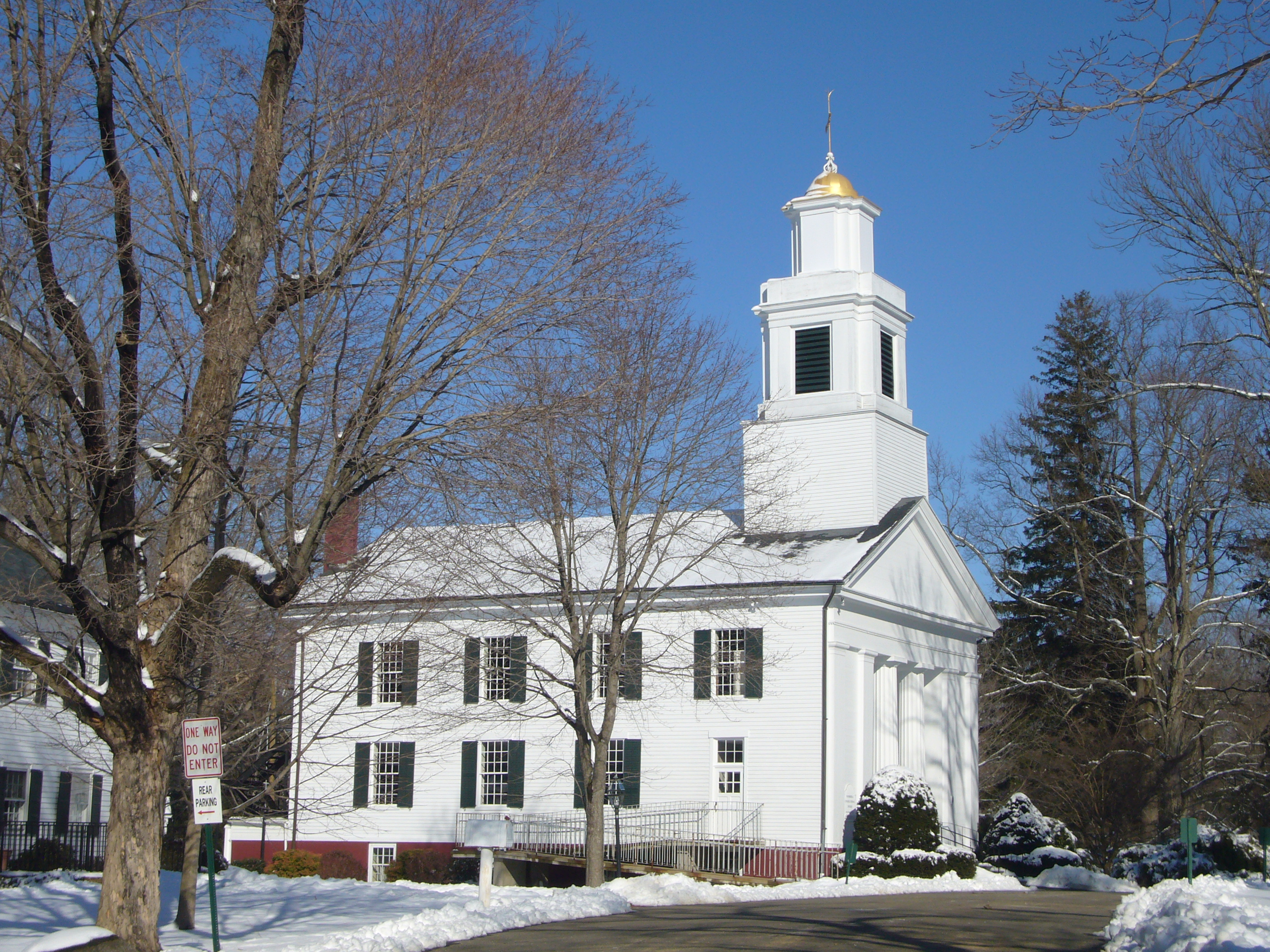

- Location within Connecticut Location within the United States
- Location: 3,4,7,11 Meetinghouse Lane; 4, 10 Newton Road, Woodbridge, Connecticut
- Coordinates: 41°21′14″N 73°0′46″W
- Area: 18 acres (7.3 ha)
- Architect: Smith, Dwight E.
- Architectural style: Greek Revival, Colonial Revival
- NRHP reference No.: 03000233
- Added to NRHP: April 18, 2003

The Woodbridge Green Historic District is a historic district encompassing the historic town center of Woodbridge, Connecticut. It is located in the block bounded on the south by Center Road (Route 114), on the east by Newton Road, and on the north and west by Meetinghouse Lane. The center is a good example of early 20th-century town planning, with good examples of Colonial and Classical Revival architecture. The district was added to the National Register of Historic Places in 2003.

== Description and history ==
The town green of Woodbridge is located on the north side of Connecticut Route 114, with Meetinghouse Lane as its primary means of circulation. The northern end of the district is anchored by the First Congregational Church, a class New England Greek Revival church built in 1832, and its adjacent Colonial Revival parish house. The church complex is separated from Meetinghouse Lane by a church-owned green. To its west stands Woodbridge's town hall, while to its south stands a complex of buildings which includes a former school (now serving as a community center and police station), the town library, and an old fire station. All of these buildings date to the period between the world wars, and have strong Colonial Revival styling.

Woodbridge was originally known as Amity Parish, and was part of New Haven. In 1784 the town of Woodbridge was established by the separation of Amity and Bethany from New Haven. Its original town center was located north of the current one, and faded away after Bethany was incorporated in 1832. In that year, Woodbridge's First Congregational Church was built at this site, the genesis of what would become the town center. The town remained a small agricultural community until the rise of the automobile in the early 20th century began its change into a more suburban area. This growth spurred the town to create a focused center for town civic affairs, resulting in the construction of most of the buildings around the green.

== See also ==
- National Register of Historic Places listings in New Haven County, Connecticut
