= Connecticut Route 67 =

State highway in Connecticut, US

Route 67
- Map of western Connecticut with Route 67 highlighted in red

Route information
- Maintained by CTDOT
- Length: 31.00 mi (49.89 km)
- Existed: 1932–present

Major junctions
- South end: Route 63 in Woodbridge
- Route 8 / Route 313 in Seymour; I-84 / US 6 in Southbury
- North end: US 7 / US 202 in New Milford

Location
- Country: United States
- State: Connecticut
- Counties: New Haven, Litchfield

Highway system
- Connecticut State Highway System; Interstate; US; State; SSR; SR; Scenic
← Route 66	→ Route 68

Route 67 is a secondary state highway in the U.S. state of Connecticut, from the town of New Milford in the Greater Danbury area to the town of Woodbridge in the outskirts of New Haven. The route runs for 31.00 miles (49.89 km). It generally follows a northwest-southeast path, and is signed north-south.

== Route description ==
Route 67 is a mostly two-lane surface road, with a short four-lane section in Southbury. It begins in New Milford as a 0.5-mile (0.80 km) concurrency with U.S. Route 202 (US 202) as the latter leaves a concurrency with US 7. After crossing the Housatonic River into the center of town, Route 67 breaks away to the southeast. In Bridgewater, it meets the northern end of Route 133. In Roxbury, it meets the southern end of Route 199 and the western end of Route 317. It then clips a corner of Woodbury before passing into New Haven County and the town of Southbury, where it passes the northern end of Route 172 before joining US 6 for a 1.6-mile (2.6 km) concurrency leading to a junction with I-84 in Southbury. Here, US 6 joins I-84 west, and Route 67 continues to the southeast. After intersecting Route 188, it enters Oxford, where it has a junction with the west end of Route 42. In Seymour, it passes the western end of Route 313 before crossing the Naugatuck River. On the east shore of the river, it meets the Route 8 expressway in Seymour. It then passes the northern end of Route 115 before heading into Woodbridge, where Route 67 ends at Route 63.

A 3.77-mile (6.07 km) section in the town of Roxbury, from the Bridgewater–Roxbury town line to 0.30 miles (0.48 km) east of Route 317, is a designated state scenic road.

== History ==
In the 19th century, part of Route 67 was a toll road known as the Oxford Turnpike that connected the towns of Seymour and Southbury via Oxford. The Oxford Turnpike was chartered in May 1795 and was one of the two earliest private toll roads in Connecticut. In 1922, the road from Woodbridge to Southbury (the old Oxford Turnpike) was designated as State Highway 147 and the road from Southbury to New Milford (via Roxbury and Bridgewater) was designated as State Highway 125. Route 67 was established in the 1932 state highway renumbering from Bridgewater (beginning at modern Route 133, which was then part of an old alignment of Route 25) to New Haven (continuing past Woodbridge along current Route 63). When Route 25 was realigned in April 1943, Route 67 took over the old Route 25 alignment to New Milford. In 1959, Route 67 was relocated to a new road (New Milford Road East) bypassing Bridgewater center, with the former alignment (Clapboard Road) becoming Route 67A. Route 67A was decommissioned, becoming unsigned SR 867, in 1964. Route 67 was truncated to its current eastern/southern end at Route 63 in Woodbridge by 1964.

== Junction list ==
County	Location	mi	km	Destinations	Notes
New Haven	Woodbridge	31.00	49.89	Route 63 – Bethany, Woodbridge, New Haven	Southern terminus
New Haven	Seymour	26.76	43.07	Route 115 south – Ansonia, Derby	Northern terminus of Route 115
New Haven	Seymour	26.65	42.89	Route 8 – Bridgeport, Waterbury	Exit 18 on Route 8
New Haven	Seymour	26.53	42.70	Route 313 east – Woodbridge, New Haven	Western terminus of Route 313
New Haven	Oxford	23.12	37.21	Route 42 east – Beacon Falls	Western terminus of Route 42
New Haven	Southbury	19.79	31.85	Route 188 south – Quaker Farms	Southern end of Route 188 concurrency
New Haven	Southbury	19.64	31.61	Route 188 north – Middlebury	Northern end of Route 188 concurrency
New Haven	Southbury	16.95	27.28	I-84 / US 6 west / Kettletown Road (SSR 487 south) – Waterbury, Danbury	Southern end of US 6 concurrency; exit 21 on I-84
New Haven	Southbury	15.38	24.75	US 6 east – Woodbury	Northern end of US 6 concurrency
New Haven	Southbury	13.37	21.52	Route 172 south – South Britain	Northern terminus of Route 172
Litchfield	Roxbury	8.69	13.99	Route 317 east – Woodbury	Western terminus of Route 317
Litchfield	Roxbury	7.78	12.52	Route 199 north – Washington	Southern terminus of Route 199
Litchfield	Bridgewater	2.57	4.14	Clapboard Road (SR 867 west)	
Litchfield	Bridgewater	3.58	5.76	Route 133 south – Bridgewater Center, Brookfield	Northern terminus of Route 133
Litchfield	New Milford	0.50	0.80	US 202 east – Litchfield	Southern end of US 202 concurrency
Litchfield	New Milford	0.00	0.00	US 7 / US 202 west – Brookfield, Kent	Northern terminus; northern end of US 202 concurrency
1.000 mi = 1.609 km; 1.000 km = 0.621 mi: Concurrency terminus
