= Connecticut Route 188 =

State highway in New Haven County, Connecticut, US

Route 188
- Map of New Haven County in southern Connecticut with Route 188 highlighted in red

Route information
- Maintained by CTDOT
- Length: 15.92 mi (25.62 km)
- Existed: 1935–present

Major junctions
- South end: Route 34 in Seymour
- I-84 in Southbury
- North end: Route 63 in Middlebury

Location
- Country: United States
- State: Connecticut
- Counties: New Haven

Highway system
- Connecticut State Highway System; Interstate; US; State; SSR; SR; Scenic
← Route 187	→ Route 189

Route 188 is a state highway in west-central Connecticut, running in an "L" pattern from Seymour to Middlebury.

== Route description ==
Route 188 begins at an intersection with Route 34 in Seymour on the east shore of the Housatonic River and heads northeast before crossing into Oxford. In Oxford, it heads northwest from its junction with the western end of Route 334 across the town before entering Southbury. In Southbury, it heads north along the Eight Mile River, briefly overlapping with Route 67. It then continues northeast past Waterbury-Oxford Airport it intersects with I-84. It then enters Middlebury, where it turns east at the center of town, briefly overlapping with Route 64 before turning southeast once again. After passing under I-84 without an interchange, Route 188 ends at an intersection with Route 63.

== History ==
Route 188 was commissioned in 1935 from former unsigned state roads, running from the current southern terminus in Seymour to Old Waterbury Road (former Route 135) in Middlebury. In approximately 1943, it was extended to its current northern terminus at Route 63 along the eastern half of former Route 135.

== Junction list ==
The entire route is in New Haven County.

Location	mi	km	Destinations	Notes
Seymour	0.00	0.00	Route 34 – Derby, Sandy Hook, Danbury	Southern terminus
Seymour	1.23	1.98	Route 334 east – Ansonia	Western terminus of Route 334
Southbury	7.89	12.70	Route 67 south – Oxford	Southern end of Route 67 concurrency
Southbury	8.03	12.92	Route 67 north – Southbury	Northern end of Route 67 concurrency
Southbury	10.24	16.48	I-84 – Waterbury, Danbury	Exit 24 on I-84
Middlebury	12.71	20.45	Route 64 west – Woodbury	Southern end of Route 64 concurrency
Middlebury	13.25	21.32	Route 64 east – Waterbury	Northern end of Route 64 concurrency
Middlebury	15.92	25.62	Route 63 – Watertown, Naugatuck	Northern terminus
1.000 mi = 1.609 km; 1.000 km = 0.621 mi: Concurrency terminus
