= Woodbury Center, Connecticut =

- Census-designated place
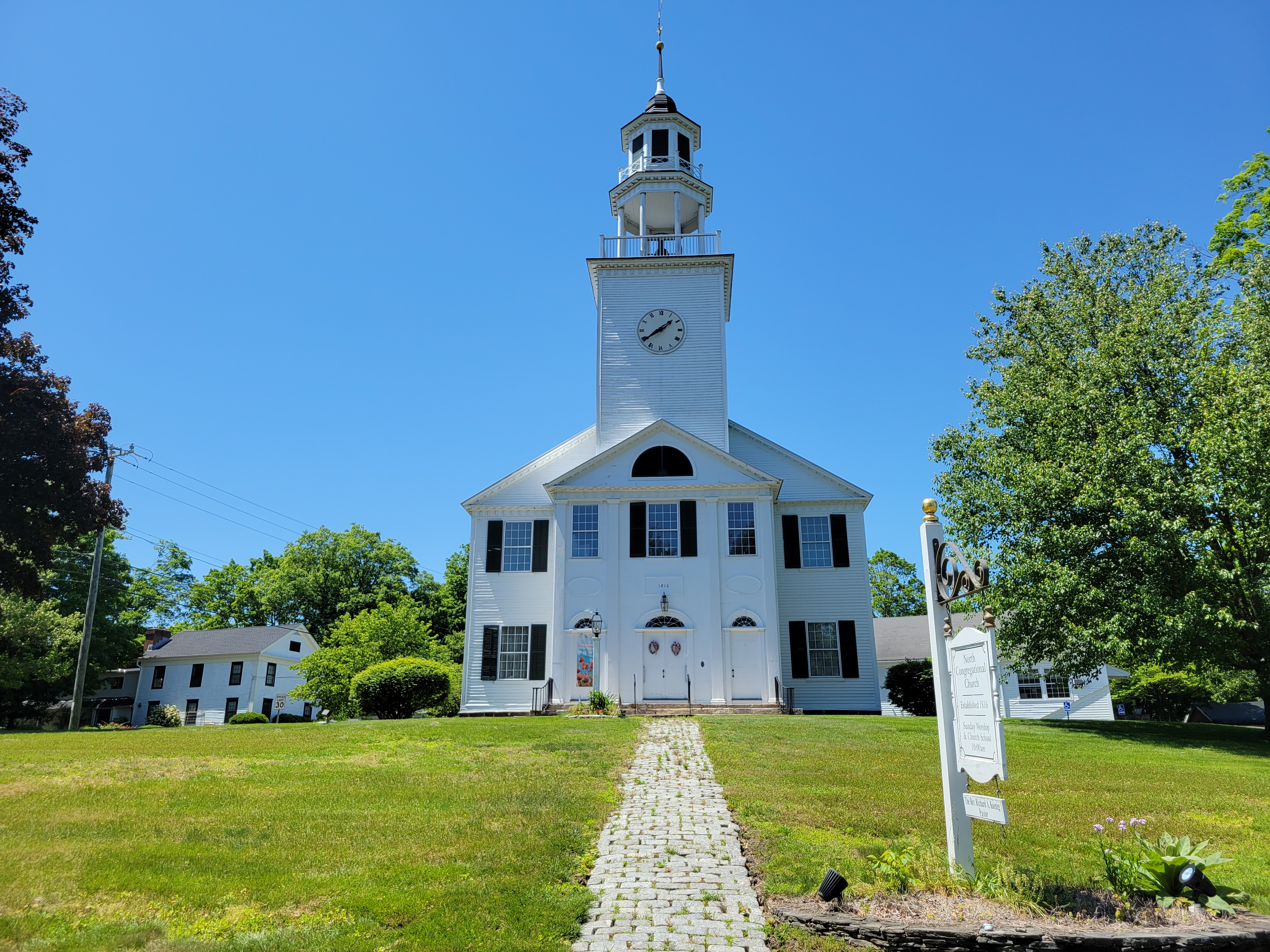
- North Congregational Church

- Location in Litchfield County, Connecticut
- Coordinates: 41°32′41″N 73°12′31″W
- State: Connecticut
- County: Litchfield
- Town: Woodbury

Area
  - Total: 1.95 sq mi (5.04 km^{2})
  - Land: 1.95 sq mi (5.04 km^{2})
  - Water: 0 sq mi (0.0 km^{2})
- Elevation: 264 ft (80 m)

Population (2010)
  - Total: 1,294
  - Density: 665/sq mi (256.8/km^{2})
- ZIP Code: 06798
- FIPS code: 09-87980
- GNIS feature ID: 2377886

Woodbury Center is a census-designated place (CDP) in Litchfield County, Connecticut, United States. It comprises the twin villages of Woodbury and North Woodbury and surrounding residential land in the town of Woodbury. As of the 2020 census, Woodbury Center had a population of 1,335.

== Geography ==
The Woodbury Center CDP is in the south-central part of the town of Woodbury, in the valley of the Pomperaug River. The adjacent villages of Woodbury and North Woodbury occupy the western side of the CDP, and the Orenaug Hills, rising to 509 feet (155 m), occupy the eastern portion. The CDP is bordered to the east by Bacon Pond Road; to the south by Old Sherman Hill Road, South Pomperaug Avenue, and Pomperaug Road; to the west by the Pomperaug River; and to the north by the Nonewaug River, a tributary of the Pomperaug.

U.S. Route 6 passes north to south through the community as Main Street. Route 6 leads northeast 7 miles (11 km) to Watertown and south 5 miles (8 km) to Southbury and an interchange with Interstate 84. Connecticut Route 47 begins in North Woodbury and leads northwest 8 miles (13 km) to Washington. Connecticut Route 317 has its eastern terminus in Woodbury village and leads west 6 miles (10 km) to Roxbury.

According to the U.S. Census Bureau, the Woodbury Center CDP has an area of 1.9 square miles (5.0 km^{2}), all land.

== Demographics ==
=== 2020 census ===
As of the 2020 census, Woodbury Center had a population of 1,335. The median age was 50.4 years. 16.3% of residents were under the age of 18 and 25.2% of residents were 65 years of age or older. For every 100 females there were 89.4 males, and for every 100 females age 18 and over there were 88.9 males age 18 and over.

97.5% of residents lived in urban areas, while 2.5% lived in rural areas.

There were 691 households in Woodbury Center, of which 18.8% had children under the age of 18 living in them. Of all households, 32.7% were married-couple households, 23.7% were households with a male householder and no spouse or partner present, and 36.2% were households with a female householder and no spouse or partner present. About 44.8% of all households were made up of individuals and 21.0% had someone living alone who was 65 years of age or older.

There were 728 housing units, of which 5.1% were vacant. The homeowner vacancy rate was 0.0% and the rental vacancy rate was 1.8%.

Racial composition as of the 2020 census
Race	Number	Percent
White	1,155	86.5%
Black or African American	17	1.3%
American Indian and Alaska Native	4	0.3%
Asian	35	2.6%
Native Hawaiian and Other Pacific Islander	1	0.1%
Some other race	24	1.8%
Two or more races	99	7.4%
Hispanic or Latino (of any race)	85	6.4%

=== 2010 census ===
As of the census of 2010, there were 1,294 people, 642 households, and 339 families residing in the CDP. The population density was 665 inhabitants per square mile (257/km^{2}). There were 704 housing units, of which 62, or 8.8%, were vacant. The racial makeup of the CDP was 93.6% White, 0.7% African American, 4.3% Asian, 0.4% some other race, and 1.1% from two or more races. Hispanic or Latino of any race were 2.4% of the population.

Of the 642 households in the community, 20.4% had children under the age of 18 living with them, 39.6% were headed by married couples living together, 9.0% had a female householder with no husband present, and 47.2% were non-families. 39.9% of all households were made up of individuals, and 15.1% were someone living alone who was 65 years of age or older. The average household size was 2.02, and the average family size was 2.72.

17.3% of the CDP population were under the age of 18, 6.8% were from 18 to 24, 24.4% were from 25 to 44, 34.2% were from 45 to 64, and 17.3% were 65 years of age or older. The median age was 45.6 years. For every 100 females, there were 84.1 males. For every 100 females age 18 and over, there were 84.8 males.

=== Income and poverty ===
For the period 2013-17, the estimated median annual income for a household in the CDP was $63,368, and the median income for a family was $75,139. Male full-time workers had a median income of $82,143 versus $37,035 for females. About 5.6% of families and 7.0% of the population were living below the poverty line, including 8.8% of those under age 18.

== Education ==
It is in the Regional School District 14.
