= Westville, New Haven =

Neighborhood in New Haven, Connecticut

Westville
- Neighborhood of New Haven
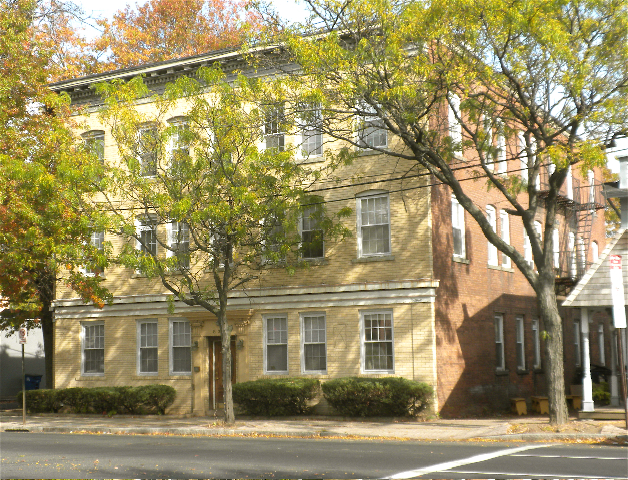
- Apartments along Whalley Avenue

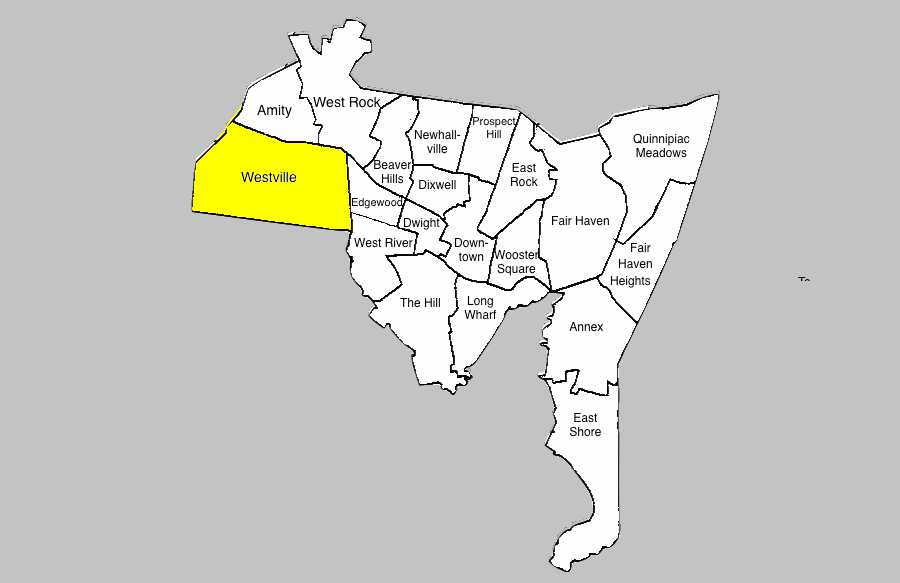
- Westville within New Haven
- Coordinates: 41°19′52″N 72°58′19″W
- Country: United States
- State: Connecticut
- City: New Haven

Westville is a neighborhood of the city of New Haven, Connecticut, United States. The area is positively reviewed for its walkability, diverse population, and livability. It is more expensive than the average American city, has lower crime rates, and graduates children from high school at rates above the national average.

== Geography ==
Westville is located in the western part of the city west of the West River. The official neighborhood planning area for Westville is defined to be the area bordered by the neighboring town of Woodbridge, Connecticut on the west (the border runs roughly along the Wilbur Cross Parkway), by the Amity neighborhood on the north (along Fountain Street), by the West Rock neighborhood on the northeast (along Valley Street), by the West River on the east, and by the city of West Haven on the south. Whalley Avenue, Edgewood Avenue, Fountain Street and Forest Road are the main through routes of the neighborhood.

Westville is a mixed-use district, with both residential and commercial zoning space. Generally, as elevation rises, the neighborhood becomes more residential. The eastern half of the residential portion of the neighborhood is a state historic district known as "Suburban Westville Historic District". Primarily commercial buildings are located along Whalley Avenue, which runs from the southeast to northwest. The commercial district of Westville that runs along Whalley Avenue has also been officially designated as a "Connecticut Main Street".

== Commercial District ==
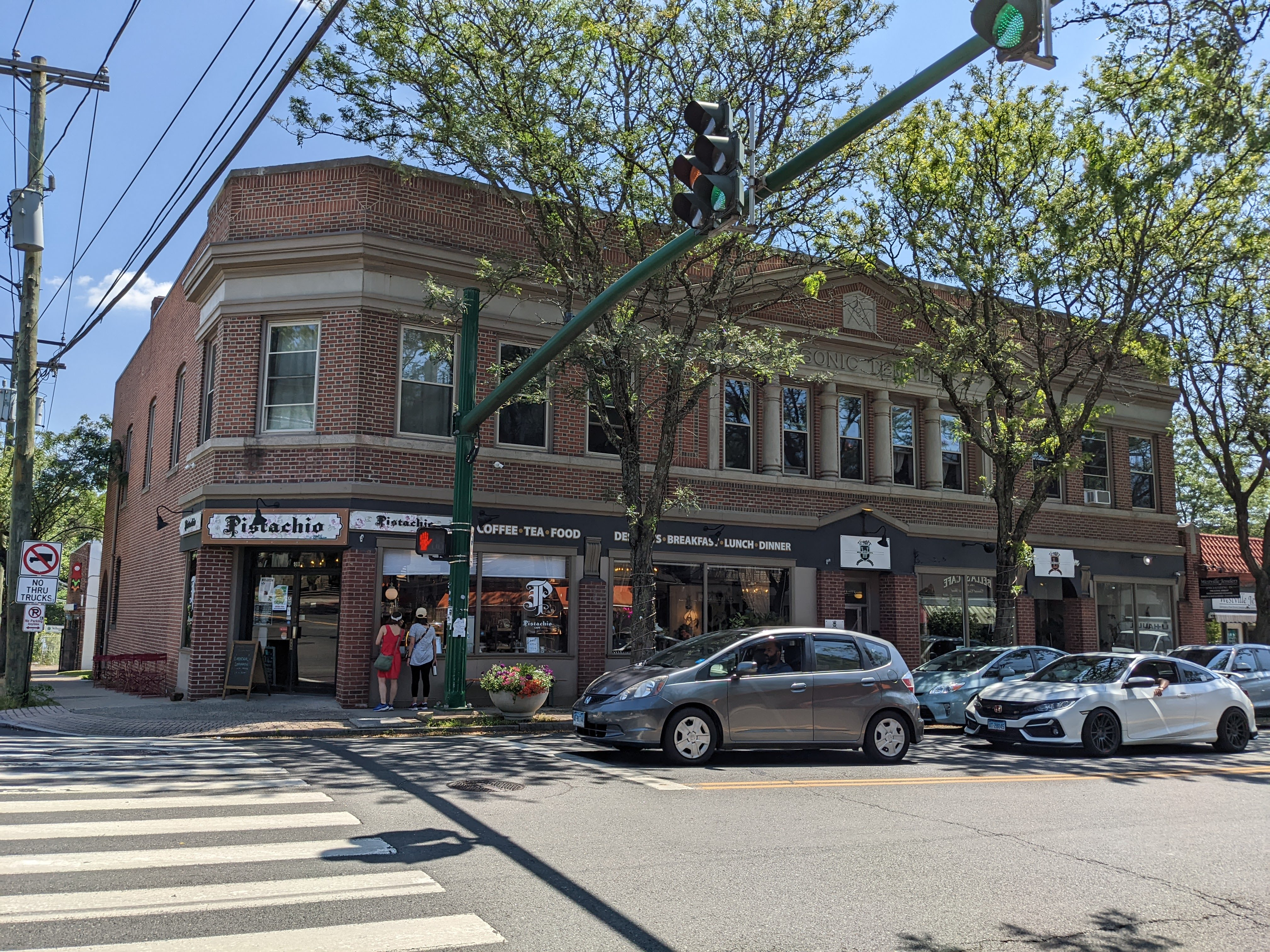
Masonic Temple at 903-11 Whalley Avenue, now home to several businesses

The "downtown" area of Westville, which is zoned for commercial use, is listed as the Westville Village Historic District on the National Register of Historic Places. The commercial area runs roughly from Fitch Street to Emerson Street along Whalley Avenue and is more commonly referred to as "Westville Village".

In 2003, the listed area was 22 acres (8.9 ha) and there were 30 contributing buildings in the district. In 2006, the listing was amended to add the former Westville Theater building at 827 Whitney Avenue, an Early Commercial style building that was built in 1912. The theater building is now occupied by Lyric Hall, a local theater and antique restoration and conservation studio.

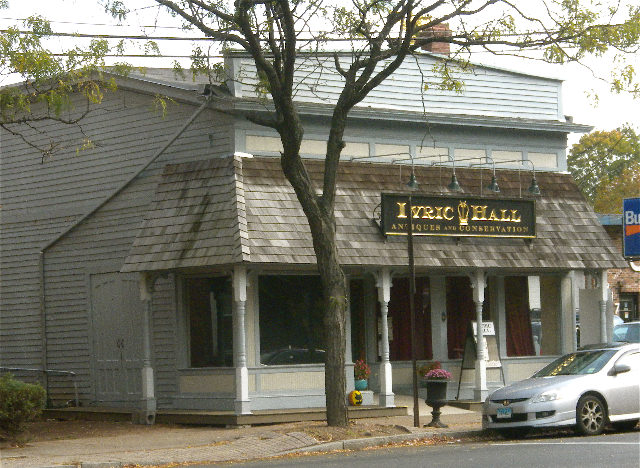
Lyric Hall, a popular performance space

The commercial area of Westville was once known for its antique stores that lined the streets. As those businesses close, the storefronts are now home to many artists galleries, hair salons, and cafes. Being home to several popular breakfast spots in New Haven, the area has been dubbed by locals as "Brunchville" on the weekends.

There is a sustained effort to increase and maintain public art in the Westville Village Historic District. There is currently work by nationally recognized artists such as Swoon and Faring Purth dotting the map of the commercial district.

== Local events ==
Every year the Westville Village Renassiance Alliance, dedicated to preserving and highlighting the Westville area, hosts annual events meant to engage the residents of New Haven and beyond. These include the 20+ year long tradition of the Westville Artwalk, as well as the Halloween Puppet Parade and Summer Concert Series. Each year there is a tree lighting and menorah ceremony hosted in the commercial district.

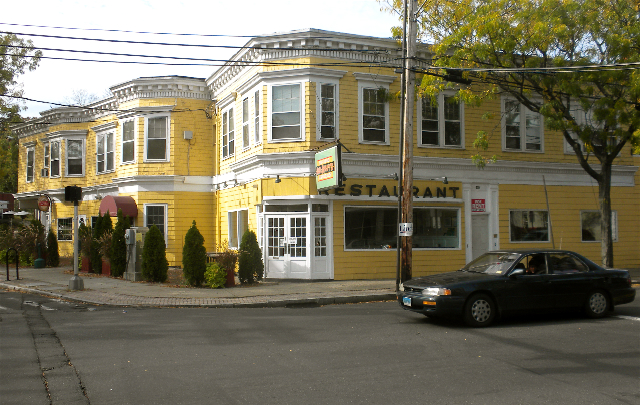
The c.1913 Hotel Edgewood housed a popular restaurant prior to a 2014 fire

== Other features ==
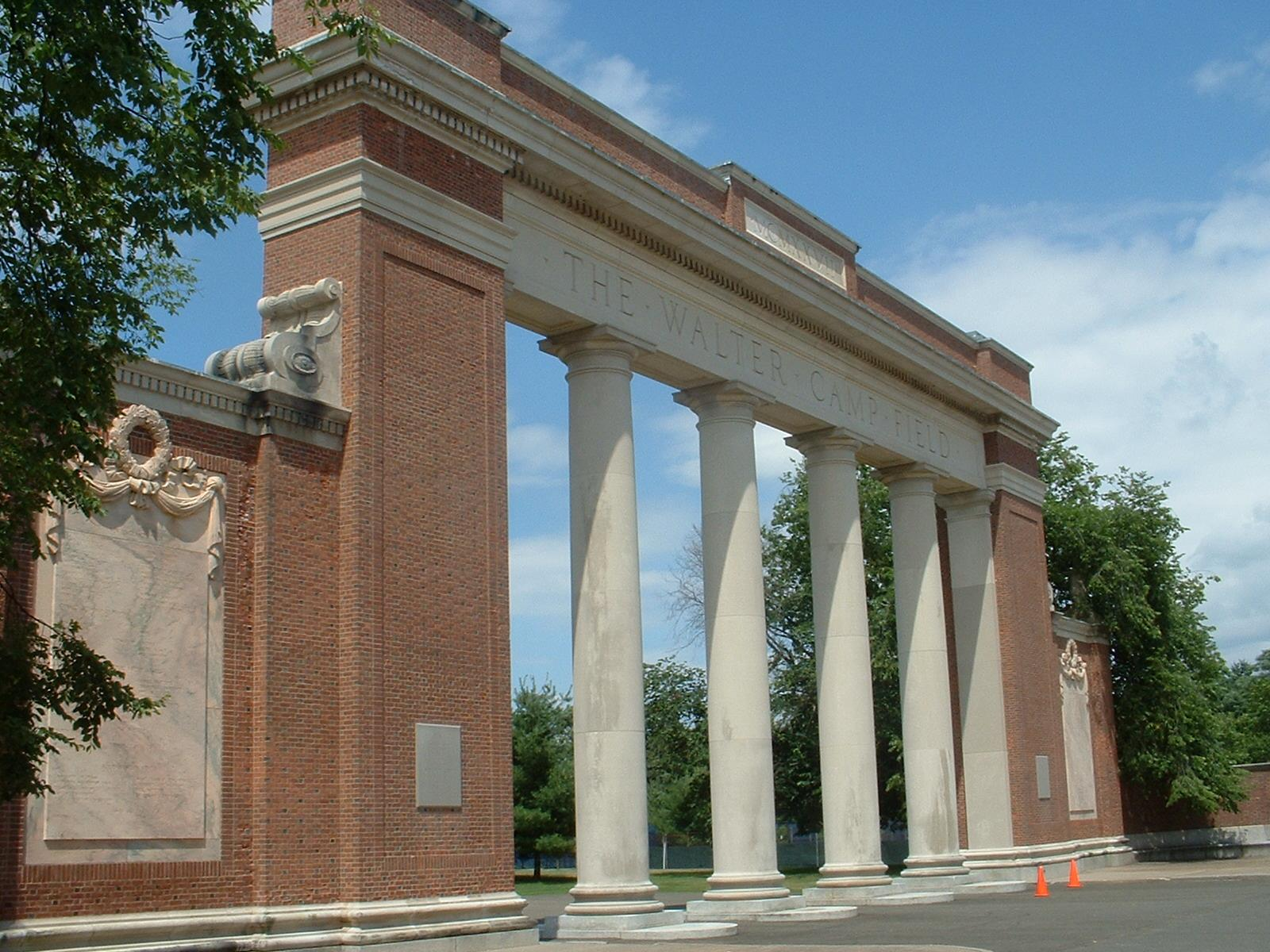
Entrance to the athletic campus of Yale University

Several of Yale University's primary athletic facilities are located in Westville. These include the Yale Bowl (football), Yale Field (baseball), Cultman Courts (tennis), and the Yale Golf Course.

The Hopkins School, one of the oldest private high schools in the nation is based here.

Westville is the home to much of the New Haven area's Jewish population. Synagogues in the neighborhood include Congregation Beth El-Keser Israel (BEKI), Bikur Cholim Shevet Achim, and Westville Synagogue - Beth Hamedrosh Hagodol - B’nai Israel.

The neighborhood of Westville butts up against Edgewood Park—one of the largest and most scenic in New Haven. It is home to tennis courts, walking trails, a duck pond, dog park, playground area, soccer field, and more.

At the end of Alden Avenue, intersecting Fountain Street, is home to one of the few lone-standing United States Post Offices in New Haven.

The corner of West Rock Avenue and Whalley Avenue, which touches the commercial district of Westville, houses a popular City Seed Farmers' Market during the warmer months.
