= New Milford (CDP), Connecticut =

New Milford, Connecticut
- Census-designated place
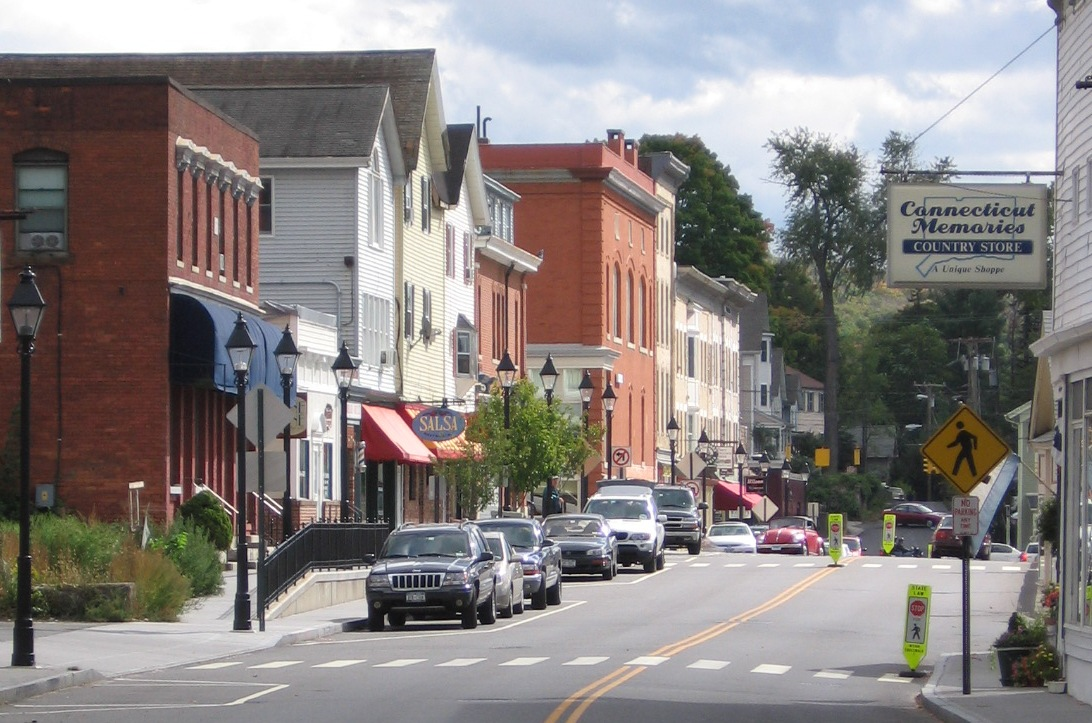
- Downtown New Milford in 2007

- Location in Litchfield County, Connecticut
- Coordinates: 41°34′36″N 73°24′38″W
- Country: United States
- State: Connecticut
- County: Litchfield
- Town: New Milford

Area
  - Total: 3.41 sq mi (8.84 km^{2})
  - Land: 3.39 sq mi (8.77 km^{2})
  - Water: 0.027 sq mi (0.07 km^{2})
- Elevation: 255 ft (78 m)

Population (2010)
  - Total: 6,523
  - Density: 1,930/sq mi (744/km^{2})
- ZIP Code: 06776
- FIPS code: 09-52560
- GNIS feature ID: 209242

Downtown New Milford is a district/census-designated place (CDP) in Litchfield County, Connecticut, United States. It comprises the main population center within the town of New Milford. As of the 2010 census, the population of Downtown New Milford was 6,523, out of 28,142 in the entire town of New Milford.

== Geography ==
Downtown New Milford is in the center of the town of New Milford, in the valley of the Housatonic River. The western edge of the CDP follows the Housatonic and a tributary, the East Aspetuck River. The CDP extends north to Paper Mill Road and south to Hine Hill Road, while the eastern edge of the CDP follows Prospect Hill Road (Connecticut Route 67), Mallett Lane, Heacock Crossbrook Road, and Park Lane Road (U.S. Route 202) north to Paper Mill Road.

U.S. Route 202 passes through the center of the community, leading northeast 18 miles (29 km) to Litchfield and south 15 miles (24 km) to Danbury. Route 67 leads southeast out of Milford 4 miles (6 km) to Roxbury.

According to the U.S. Census Bureau, the district has a total area of 3.4 square miles (8.8 km^{2}), of which 0.03 square miles (0.07 km^{2}), or 0.79%, are water.

== Demographics ==
As of the census of 2020, there were 7,160 people, 2,984 households residing in Downtown New Milford. The population density was 1,760 inhabitants per square mile (680/km^{2}). The racial makeup of the CDP was 74.4% White, 3.8% African American, 0.0% Native American, 4.3% Asian, 0.00% Native Hawaiian or Pacific Islander, 8.3% some other race, and 2.0% from two or more races. Hispanic or Latino of any race were 14.7% of the population.

25.6% of the CDP population were under the age of 18. The median age was 40.1 years. For every 100 females, there were 93.8 males. For every 100 females age 18 and over, there were 91.8 males.

For the period 2013–17, the estimated median income for a household in the CDP was $57,768, and the median income for a family was $72,786. The per capita income for the CDP was $30,798. 8.6% of families and 11.0% of the total population were living below the poverty line, including 15.6% of people under 18 and 7.5% of those over 64.

== Education ==
It is in the New Milford School District.
