= Connecticut Route 150 =

State highway in New Haven County, Connecticut, US

Route 150
- Map of New Haven County in southern Connecticut with Route 150 highlighted in red

Route information
- Maintained by CTDOT
- Length: 9.04 mi (14.55 km)
- Existed: 1932 (extended 1962)–present

Major junctions
- South end: Route 22 in North Branford
- I-91 in Wallingford; Route 15 / Wilbur Cross Parkway in Wallingford
- North end: US 5 in Wallingford

Location
- Country: United States
- State: Connecticut
- Counties: New Haven

Highway system
- Connecticut State Highway System; Interstate; US; State; SSR; SR; Scenic
← Route 149	→ Route 151

Route 150 is a state highway in southern Connecticut running for 9.04 miles (14.55 km) from the village of Northford, in the town of North Branford, through the center of Wallingford, to the village of Yalesville in Wallingford.

== Route description ==
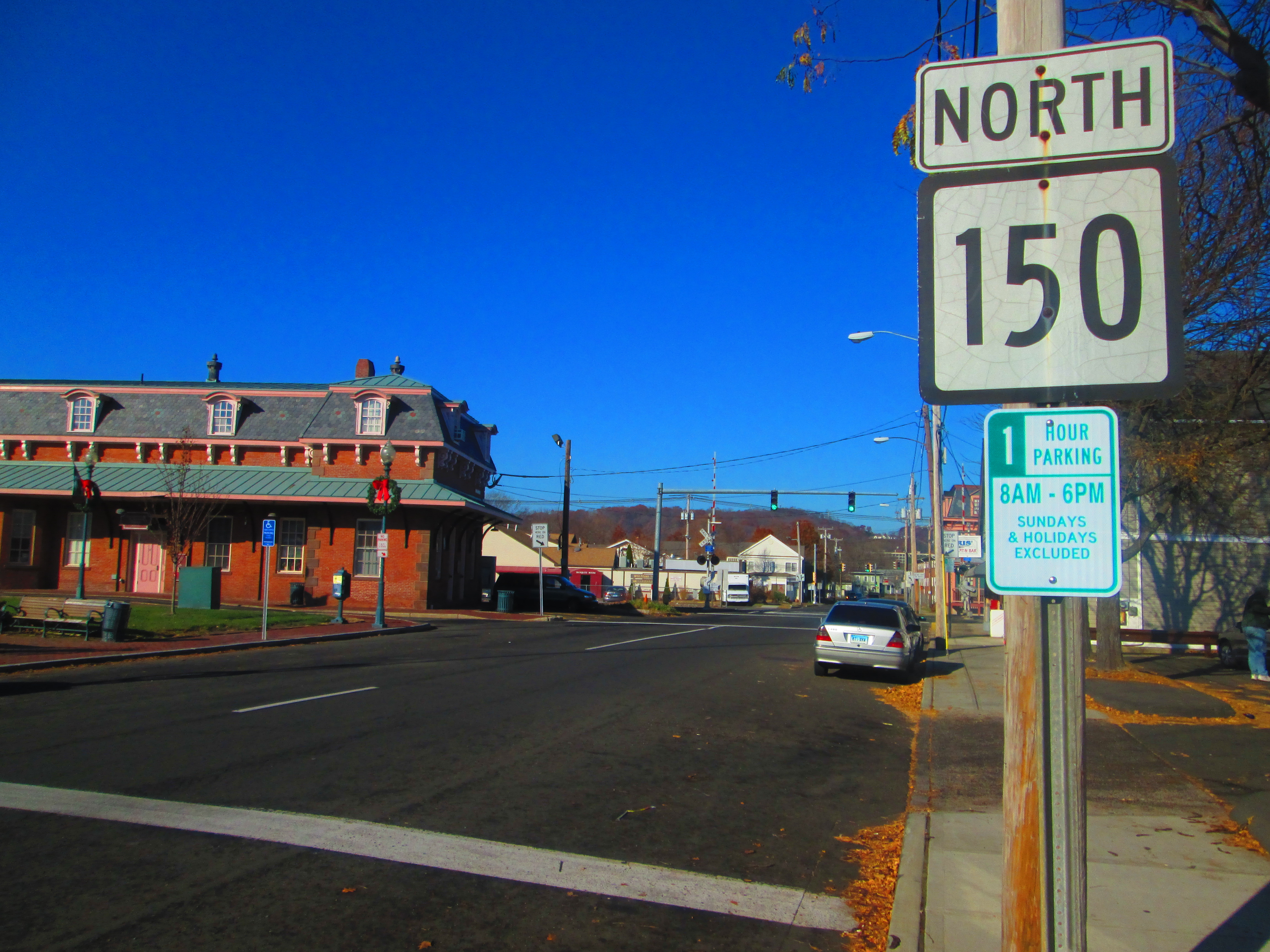
Route 150 approaching the Wallingford Amtrak station

Route 150 begins at an intersection with Route 22 in North Branford and heads northwest into Wallingford. In Wallingford, it heads north, intersecting I-91 at Exit 13. It then continues north and northwest to the center of Wallingford, where it crosses US 5. It then crosses the Quinnipiac River and intersects the Wilbur Cross Parkway (Route 15) at Exit 58B, where it bends north-northeast. It meets Route 68 in the center of Yalesville just before crossing the Quinnipiac a second time. It then overlaps Route 71 for 0.13 miles through the one-lane Yalesville Underpass. After the underpass, Route 71 turns off to the southeast as Route 150 continues to end at US 5 just South of the Meriden town line.

== History ==
The road from Wallingford Center to the village of Northford was known as State Highway 226 in the 1920s. Route 150 was commissioned in 1932 partly from the western half of old Highway 226, running east–west from Cheshire to McKenzie Reservoir in eastern Wallingford along Wallingford Road, Center Street, East Center Street. In 1961, the rest of old Highway 226 was incorporated into Route 150, continuing south of East Wallingford along Northford Road to Route 17 in Northford. The following year, however, the section of Route 150 east of the current intersection with East Center Street (modern SR 738) was shifted to the current route along Woodhouse Avenue, with the southern terminus set at Route 17 in Northford. The Yalesville Underpass, built in 1838 and believed to be the oldest skew arch underpass in North America, was incorporated into Route 150 also in 1962, when the route was extended to its current northern terminus via a section of the old Hartford and New Haven Turnpike (former SR 555). In 1963, the southern terminus was shifted slightly to its current location at Route 22 with the section beyond the current terminus transferred to Route 22.

== Junction list ==
The entire route is in New Haven County.

Location	mi	km	Destinations	Notes
North Branford	0.00	0.00	Route 22 – Northford, North Haven	Southern terminus
Wallingford	2.97	4.78	I-91 – New Haven, Hartford	Exit 13 on I-91
Wallingford	5.16	8.30	US 5 – North Haven, Meriden	
Wallingford	5.80	9.33	Route 15 (Wilbur Cross Parkway) – Hartford, New Haven	Exit 58B on Wilbur Cross Parkway
Wallingford	8.03	12.92	Route 68 – Cheshire, Durham	
Wallingford	8.50– 8.63	13.68– 13.89	Route 71 – Meriden, Berlin	
Wallingford	9.04	14.55	US 5 – Wallingford, Meriden	Northern terminus
1.000 mi = 1.609 km; 1.000 km = 0.621 mi
