= Connecticut Route 176 =

State highway in Hartford County, Connecticut, US

Route 176
- Map of Hartford County in northern Connecticut with Route 176 highlighted in red

Route information
- Maintained by CTDOT
- Length: 4.14 mi (6.66 km)
- Existed: 1932–present

Major junctions
- South end: US 5 / Route 15 / Berlin Turnpike in Newington
- North end: Newington Avenue at the Newington–Hartford line

Location
- Country: United States
- State: Connecticut
- Counties: Hartford

Highway system
- Connecticut State Highway System; Interstate; US; State; SSR; SR; Scenic
← Route 175	→ Route 177

Route 176 is a state highway in central Connecticut, running from the Berlin Turnpike in southern Newington to the Newington–Hartford town line. A section of Route 176 in Newington from its southern terminus to Route 175 is designated the "Newington VFD Memorial Highway".

== Route description ==
Route 176 begins at an intersection with the Berlin Turnpike (US 5 and Route 15) in southern Newington. It heads north, intersecting with the eastern end of Route 174 and the western end of Route 287 as it proceeds towards the town center. At the town center, Route 176, has a junction with Route 175, the main east–west route through the town. After about a mile, Route 176 turns northeast to follow Hartford Avenue. It ends after another mile at the Hartford town line. The road continues into Hartford as Newington Avenue, a local street in the southwest corner of Hartford.

== History ==
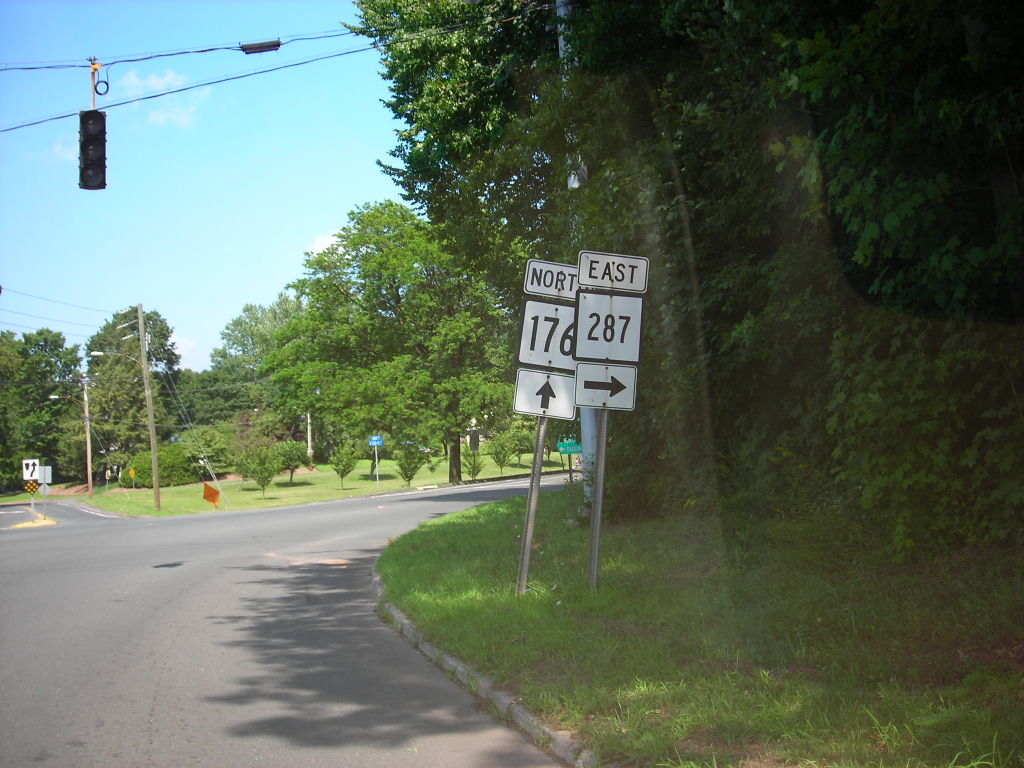
CT 176 at CT 287 in Newington

Route 176 was established in 1932, originally running north into Hartford and ending at New Britain Avenue (then Route 71). The original route continued along Main Street and South Street instead of using Hartford Avenue, which at the time was part of Route 175. In 1940, the Hartford Avenue section of Route 175 was transferred to Route 176 and the section of Route 176 north of that point was re-designated Route 176A. In 1962, Route 176 was truncated at the Hartford town line and Route 176A was turned over to the towns.

== Junction list ==
The entire route is in Hartford County.

Location	mi	km	Destinations	Notes
Newington	0.00	0.00	US 5 / Route 15 (Berlin Turnpike) – New Haven, Hartford	Southern terminus
Newington	0.64	1.03	Route 174 west – New Britain	Eastern terminus of Route 174
Newington	1.17	1.88	Route 287 east – Wethersfield	Western terminus of Route 287
Newington	1.99	3.20	Route 175 – New Britain, Wethersfield	
Newington–Hartford line	4.14	6.66	Newington Avenue – Hartford	Continuation north
1.000 mi = 1.609 km; 1.000 km = 0.621 mi
