= Connecticut Route 287 =

State highway in Hartford County, Connecticut, US

Route 287
- Map of Hartford County in northern Connecticut with Route 287 highlighted in red

Route information
- Maintained by CTDOT
- Length: 3.36 mi (5.41 km)
- Existed: 1969-1970–present

Major junctions
- West end: Route 176 in Newington
- US 5 / Route 15 / Berlin Turnpike in Newington
- East end: Route 3 in Wethersfield

Location
- Country: United States
- State: Connecticut
- Counties: Hartford

Highway system
- Connecticut State Highway System; Interstate; US; State; SSR; SR; Scenic
← Route 286	→ Route 289

Route 287 is a Connecticut state highway in the southern Hartford suburbs, running from Newington to Wethersfield. It serves the community of Griswoldville in Wethersfield.

== Route description ==
Route 287 begins as East Robbins Avenue at an intersection with Route 176 in Newington. It heads east for 0.8 miles (1.3 km) to the Berlin Turnpike (US 5 and Route 15), briefly overlapping it to reach Prospect Street. Route 287 soon crosses into Wethersfield, passing by the Wethersfield Country Club in the Griswoldville neighborhood. Route 287 ends at an intersection with Route 3 near Old Wethersfield.

The section of Route 287 in Wethersfield is designated the Bohdan "Bo" Kolinsky Memorial Highway.

== History ==
Route 287 was established from previously unsigned state roads, SR 544 (Prospect Street) and SR 760 (Robbins Avenue), in 1969. However, it was not included in the official state highway map until 1975 because part of the route had been in arbitration with the town of Newington. It has had no significant changes since.

== Junction list ==
The entire route is in Hartford County.

Location	mi	km	Destinations	Notes
Newington	0.00	0.00	Route 176 – Berlin, Newington Center, Hartford	Western terminus
Newington	0.76	1.22	US 5 south / Route 15 south (Berlin Turnpike) – Berlin, Meriden, New Haven	Western end of US 5/Route 15 concurrency
Newington	0.83	1.34	US 5 north / Route 15 north (Berlin Turnpike) – Hartford, East Hartford	Eastern end of US 5/Route 15 concurrency
Wethersfield	3.36	5.41	Route 3 to Route 99 – Wethersfield, Rocky Hill, Cromwell, Glastonbury	Eastern terminus
1.000 mi = 1.609 km; 1.000 km = 0.621 mi
