= U.S. Route 5 in Connecticut =

Section of U.S. Route in Connecticut, United States

U.S. Route 5
- US 5 highlighted in red

Route information
- Maintained by CTDOT
- Length: 54.59 mi (87.85 km)
- Existed: 1926–present
- History: Designated Route 2 in 1922

Major junctions
- South end: I-91 in New Haven
- Route 40 in North Haven; Route 15 / Wilbur Cross Parkway in Wallingford and Meriden; I-691 in Meriden; Route 9 / Route 372 in Berlin; I-91 in Hartford; Route 2 / Route 15 in East Hartford; I-84 / US 6 in East Hartford; US 44 in East Hartford; I-291 / Route 30 in South Windsor
- North end: US 5 at the Massachusetts state line in Enfield

Location
- Country: United States
- State: Connecticut
- Counties: New Haven, Hartford

Highway system
- United States Numbered Highway System; List; Special; Divided; Connecticut State Highway System; Interstate; US; State; SSR; SR; Scenic
← Route 4	→ US 5A

U.S. Route 5 (US 5), a north–south United States Numbered Highway that is generally paralleled by Interstate 91 (I-91), begins at the city of New Haven in Connecticut and heads north through western Massachusetts and eastern Vermont to the international border with Canada. Within Connecticut, US 5 proceeds north from New Haven and passes through Meriden and Hartford toward Springfield, Massachusetts.

US 5 begins at exit 5 of I-91 northeast of Downtown New Haven, heading north through the suburbs of New Haven. It crosses the Quinnipiac River in North Haven, shifting eastward to a different road. US 5 continues north through the town of Wallingford before entering the city of Meriden. North of Meriden, it becomes a four-lane arterial road known as the Berlin Turnpike, where a long overlap with Route 15 also begins. US 5 continues through the southern suburbs of Hartford along the Berlin Turnpike, shifting just south of the city line to the Wilbur Cross Highway, a freeway. The Wilbur Cross Highway bypasses Downtown Hartford and crosses the Connecticut River on the Charter Oak Bridge into East Hartford. From here, US 5 exits the Wilbur Cross Highway and runs along a four-lane, divided surface road to South Windsor before returning to a two-lane road the rest of the way to the Massachusetts state line in Enfield.

US 5 roughly follows the route used by the Upper Post Road, an early colonial highway for transporting mail between New York City and Boston. The route was first improved in 1798 as the Hartford and New Haven Turnpike, which ran in a nearly straight line between the court houses of New Haven and Hartford. In 1922, the Upper Boston Post Road corridor was designated as Route 2 of the New England road marking system, crossing to the east of the Connecticut River in Hartford before continuing north to the Massachusetts state line. In 1926, Route 2 was redesignated as US 5. Several realignments have been made in the cities of New Haven and Hartford with the opening of several expressways in these areas. Because it is closely paralleled by I-91 between New Haven and Hartford, US 5 serves mainly as a secondary route today.

== Route description ==
=== New Haven County ===
US 5 begins on State Street at exit 5 of I-91 in New Haven. State Street continues southwest into downtown as a local, unnumbered street. US 5 starts out as an undivided four-lane road, becoming two lanes just before crossing into Hamden. State Street continues north through Hamden and the industrial section of North Haven, closely paralleling the Amtrak railroad tracks on the west side of the Quinnipiac River. It has an interchange with Route 40 in this area. US 5 then turns right at the intersection with Bishop Street in North Haven and crosses the Quinnipiac River, the railroad tracks, and I-91 (at exit 11) overlapped with Route 22 on a four-lane wide road.

The bridge ends at a four-way intersection where US 5 turns left on Washington Avenue, Route 22 continues straight on Clintonville Road, and Route 103 begins on the right along Washington Avenue. The four-lane Washington Avenue runs through the commercial areas of North Haven still paralleling the railroad tracks, crosses under I-91 (at exit 12) and continues into Wallingford as South Colony Street. At the town line is Wharton Brook State Park, just north of SR 702, a short freeway that provides access to I-91. South Colony Street narrows to two lanes within Wallingford Center.

After crossing Center Street (Route 150) near Wallingford station, the road becomes North Colony Street and heads out of the town center. The road crosses Route 68 at a one-quadrant interchange about two miles (3.2 km) later, followed by a series of junctions about half a mile (0.80 km) apart each: an interchange with the Wilbur Cross Parkway (at exit 61), a split to the left where Route 71 begins and a merge from the left where Route 150 ends.

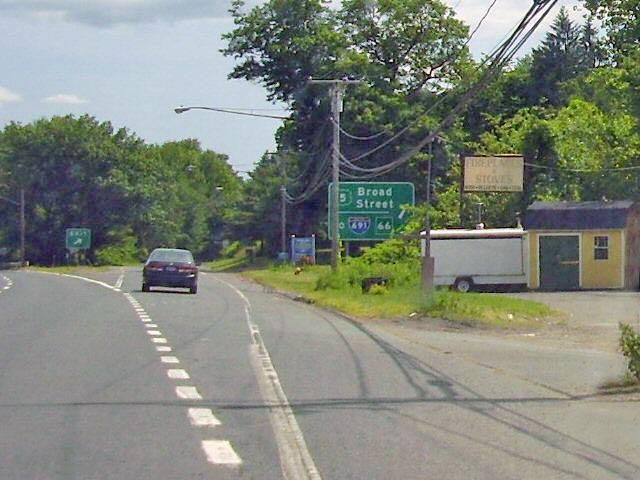
South end of the overlap between Route 15 and US 5. US 5 is signed as an unnumbered exit indicating "To I-691, Route 66"

At the merge with Route 150 just before the town line, US 5 then follows South Broad Street (the alignment of the old Hartford and New Haven Turnpike) into the city of Meriden. South Broad Street becomes Broad Street after the intersection with Hall Avenue as it passes by the eastern part of the city, avoiding the downtown area. Past Olive Street, the road becomes divided with a wide grassy median. At the north end of the divided section, it has an intersection with East Main Street, the main east–west business route through the city. About 0.7 miles (1.1 km) north of East Main Street, US 5 has an interchange with I-691 (at exit 2A). At the intersection with Brittania Street, the road becomes North Broad Street, which climbs up on a slope as it meets with the north end of the Wilbur Cross Parkway. The northbound roadway overpasses the parkway and then merges onto it from the right. This is the beginning of a 15-mile (24 km) overlap with Route 15. Southbound at the beginning of the parkway, US 5 is signed as an exit (with no number) from the main roadway. North Broad Street continues north from the merge as a divided four-lane surface road for another 1.1 miles (1.8 km) up to the Berlin town line, where the road becomes the Berlin Turnpike.

=== Hartford County ===
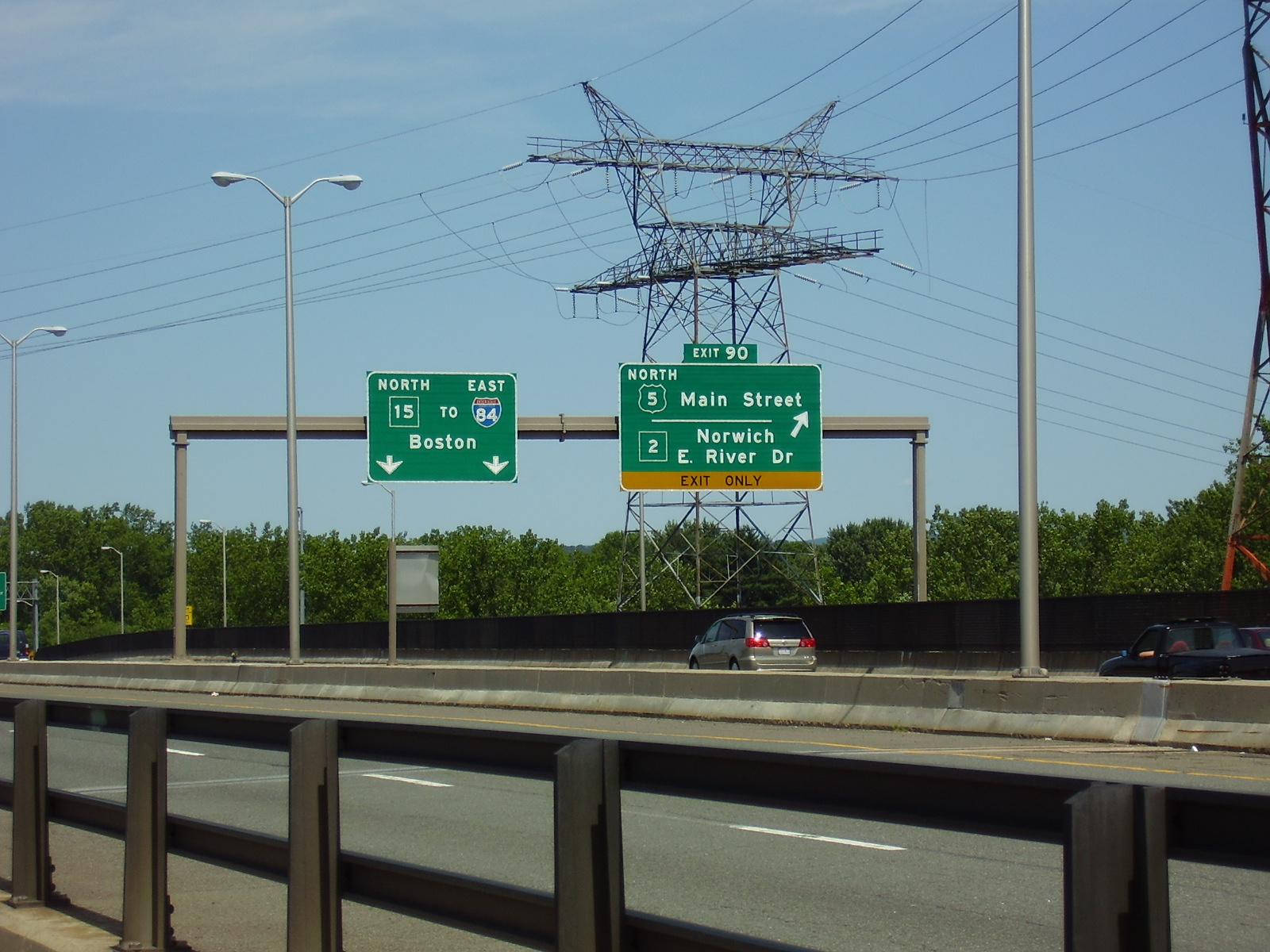
North end of the Route 15/US 5 overlap on the Wilbur Cross Highway

US 5 and Route 15 run for 10 miles (16 km) along the Berlin Turnpike within the towns of Berlin, Newington, and Wethersfield. The Berlin Turnpike is mostly a four-lane arterial road with some six-lane sections and is the alignment of the old Hartford and New Haven Turnpike. In Berlin, it has an interchange with the Route 9 freeway. In Wethersfield, Route 5 and Route 15 leave the Berlin Turnpike to travel along the Wilbur Cross Highway, a freeway bypass along the south of Downtown Hartford. The Wilbur Cross Highway runs through Wethersfield and Hartford, then crosses the Connecticut River into East Hartford on the Charter Oak Bridge. Just prior to the river crossing in Hartford, the Wilbur Cross Highway runs parallel to and interconnects with I-91 near the vicinity of Hartford–Brainard Airport. Just after the crossing, US 5 exits from the Wilbur Cross Highway on exit 90, ending the long overlap with Route 15. US 5 continues north to East Hartford center along Main Street.

From East Hartford northward to the Massachusetts state line, US 5 runs along the east bank of the Connecticut River. Main Street in East Hartford is mostly a four-lane divided surface road. It crosses under I-84 about 0.5 miles (0.80 km) north of the split with Route 15 with access to the westbound direction only. Main Street continues through the town center, intersecting (and briefly overlapping) US 44. North of the town center, US 5 leaves Main Street to go on Ellington Road (via a short segment of King Street) until the South Windsor town line, where the road becomes known as John Fitch Boulevard (a four-lane arterial road). About half a mile (0.80 km) further north, US 5 has an interchange with I-291 (at exit 4) that also includes access to Route 30, the main road to the South Windsor town center. John Fitch Boulevard continues through the rest of South Windsor, passing through the village of East Windsor Hill near the East Windsor town line.

After crossing into the town of East Windsor, the roadway becomes two lanes wide with auxiliary left turn lanes and is known as South Main Street. It intersects with Route 191 (Phelps Street), which leads to the East Windsor town center. About half a mile (0.80 km) north of this junction, US 5 leaves Main Street to go on Prospect Hill Road, bypassing the Warehouse Point area. There is also a partial interchange with I-91 in this area (at exit 44). Just south of the Enfield town line, US 5 intersects with Route 140, which crosses the Connecticut River into the town of Windsor Locks and Bradley International Airport.

In Enfield, the road becomes known as King Street, crossing over I-91 with a full interchange (exit 46). As it approaches the town center, the road becomes known as Enfield Street. It has a grade-separated intersection with Route 190 in this area. Just before going across the state line, US 5 crosses over I-91 again (at exit 49) and becomes Longmeadow Street as it enters the town of Longmeadow, Massachusetts.

== History ==
The Upper Post Road was established in 1673 between New York City and Boston via New Haven, Hartford, Springfield, and Worcester. From New Haven to Hartford, it ran at various times via Middletown (now roughly Route 17 and Route 99) and via Meriden (now very roughly US 5). North of Hartford, the road remained on the west side of the Connecticut River, following the general path of present Route 159.

Along this route between New Haven and Hartford, the Hartford and New Haven Turnpike was chartered in 1798 and opened in 1799, beginning at Grove Street in New Haven and leaving on Whitney Avenue, passing via Meriden and Berlin, and entering Hartford on Maple Avenue. This was one of the first turnpikes to be built on a straight line rather than along existing roads.

In the 1910s, Connecticut and Massachusetts adopted a system of marking major roads by colors. The route from New Haven to Springfield, crossing the Connecticut River at Hartford, was marked with blue bands, signifying a major north–south route. This route crossed the Quinnipiac River in New Haven, heading north along an old road (now Route 103 and US 5) to Tracy, crossing the turnpike and running through downtown Meriden on Old Colony Road, Cook Avenue, and Colony Street. It then used the turnpike alignment from Lamentation State Park into Hartford. From East Hartford north to Springfield, another older road was used.

New England Route 2 shield

When the New England road marking system was adopted in 1922, Route 2 was assigned to a route from New Haven north via Hartford and Springfield toward Sherbrooke, Quebec. This route followed the older blue-banded route from New Haven north to Hartford. At Hartford, Route 2 crossed the Connecticut River on the Bulkeley Bridge and ran north from East Hartford to Springfield on the east side of the river.

US 5 was designated in 1926 along the Route 2 alignment. Between 1926 and 1932, US 5 and Route 2 were cosigned throughout the length of the route. In the 1932 state highway renumbering, the Route 2 designation was removed, leaving only the US 5 designation. Only a small number of changes have been made since then, the most prominent being in the cities of New Haven and Hartford.

US 5 initially used Temple Street, Whitney Avenue, Edwards Street, and upper State Street in New Haven, beginning at US 1 (Chapel Street). By the 1940s, it had been moved onto a bypass of the downtown area, consisting of Edwards Street, Hillside Place, Munson Street, Henry Street, Sherman Avenue, Winthrop Avenue, and Davenport Avenue, ending at US 1 west of downtown. At the time, it still crossed the river on Middletown Avenue; the route leaving to the north on State Street was signed as an alternate route. The main and alternate routes were swapped by the mid-1950s, and US 5 was sent down East Street to US 1. (The alternate is now Route 103.) The old bypass became extensions of Route 80 and Route 10 but is now unnumbered. The final changes truncated US 5 to I-91 when I-91 opened in 1966 in New Haven and relocated US 5 to the new Route 22 connector across I-91 in North Haven in 1973, leaving the old route on Broadway as unsigned State Road 729.

In Hartford, the original alignment of US 5 entered the city on Maple Avenue and made its way to the Bulkeley Bridge via Main Street, Central Row, and Columbus Boulevard. The route was shifted slightly eastward to Wyllys Street and Columbus Boulevard by 1941. The opening of the Charter Oak Bridge and Hartford Bypass on September 5, 1942 led to US 5 bypassing downtown Hartford on its current alignment; US 5 Alternate, an alternate route on the west side of the Connecticut River to Springfield, was extended south along Main Street to the beginning of the bypass.

In the early 1940s, several sections of US 5 in the Hartford area were upgraded to four-lane boulevards. The Berlin Turnpike segment was reconstructed as a four-lane expressway, with several segments also straightened out. In East Hartford and South Windsor, a new four-lane expressway, John Fitch Boulevard, was also constructed. Both of these roadways opened in 1942. In 1948, Route 15 was designated on the Berlin Turnpike and Hartford Bypass segments of US 5 in order to connect the Merritt Parkway and Wilbur Cross Parkway to the Wilbur Cross Highway, providing a continuous high-speed route between New York and Massachusetts.

== Special designations ==
Many sections of various state highways in Connecticut have commemorative designations for various veterans organizations or groups, as well as military servicemembers and Connecticut state troopers killed in the line of duty. In the case of US 5, most of its non-expressway alignment except for the Berlin Turnpike has been given a commemorative designation by the Connecticut General Assembly over the years. The following segments of US 5 have such designations:

- The portion from the Hamden–North Haven town line to Devine Street (SR 720) in North Haven is also known as the "Korean War Veterans Chapter 204 Memorial Highway".
- The portion from Devine Street (SR 720) to Bishop Street in North Haven is also known as the "VFW Post 10128 Memorial Highway".
- The Route 5/Route 22 connector between State Street and Washington Avenue in North Haven is also known as the "Officer Timothy W. Laffin Memorial Highway". Timothy Laffin was a North Haven Police officer who lost his life in a motor vehicle accident while pursuing a wanted suspect.
- South Colony Street in Wallingford, running from the North Haven–Wallingford town line to Route 150 in Wallingford Center, is also known as the "American Legion Shaw-Sinon Post 73 Memorial Highway".
- South Broad Street from the northern Route 150 junction in Wallingford to the Meriden town line is also known as the "VFW Connecticut Ladies Auxiliary Highway".
- The portion from the I-84 junction in East Hartford to the East Windsor–Enfield town line is also known as the "Purple Heart Highway".

== Junction list ==
County	Location	mi	km	Exit	Destinations	Notes
New Haven	New Haven	0.00	0.00		I-91 south to I-95 – New London, New York City	Southern terminus; exit 5 on I-91 north (future exit 1F)
New Haven	North Haven	4.66– 4.74	7.50– 7.63		Route 40 / Dixwell Avenue (SR 717 west) (Bailey Road) / I-91 – Hartford, New Haven, Mount Carmel, Hamden	Exit 1D on Route 40
New Haven	North Haven	4.81	7.74		Devine Street (SR 720)	
New Haven	North Haven	5.69	9.16		Broadway (SR 729)	Former US 5/Route 22
New Haven	North Haven	5.82	9.37		Route 22 west (Bishop Street) – Mount Carmel	Southern end of Route 22 concurrency
New Haven	North Haven	6.21	9.99		To I-91 south – New Haven	Exit 11 on I-91 north (future exit 7)
New Haven	North Haven	6.48	10.43		Route 22 east (Clintonville Road) / Route 103 south (Washington Avenue) – Clintonville, Montowese	Northern end of Route 22 concurrency; northern terminus of Route 103
New Haven	North Haven	7.19	11.57		I-91 – Hartford, New Haven	Exit 12 on I-91 (future exit 8)
New Haven	Wallingford	9.40	15.13		To I-91 – Hartford, New Haven	Access via SR 702
New Haven	Wallingford	11.42	18.38		Route 150 – Yalesville, Northford	
New Haven	Wallingford	13.58	21.85		Route 68 (Church Street) – Cheshire, Durham	One-quadrant interchange
New Haven	Wallingford	13.96	22.47		Route 15 (Wilbur Cross Parkway) – Hartford, New Haven	Exit 61 on Wilbur Cross Parkway
New Haven	Wallingford	14.42	23.21		Route 71 north (Old Colony Road) – Meriden	Southern terminus of Route 71; former US 5A
New Haven	Wallingford	14.88	23.95		Route 150 south (Broad Street) – Yalesville	Northern terminus of Route 150
New Haven	Meriden	17.81	28.66		I-691 to I-91 / I-84 – Middletown, Waterbury	Exit 2A on I-691; former Route 66
New Haven	Meriden	19.30	31.06		Route 15 south (Wilbur Cross Parkway) to I-91 south – New Haven	Southern end of Route 15 concurrency; southbound exit and northbound entrance; interchange
Hartford	Berlin	23.99– 24.35	38.61– 39.19		Route 9 / Route 372 – Middletown, New Britain, East Berlin	Interchange; exits 31 and 32 on Route 9
Hartford	Berlin				Worthington Ridge Road (SR 572 south)	
Hartford	Berlin	25.17	40.51		Route 160 east – Rocky Hill	Western terminus of Route 160
Hartford	Newington	26.67	42.92		Route 173 north – West Hartford	Southern terminus of Route 173
Hartford	Newington	27.29	43.92		Route 176 west – Newington	Eastern terminus of Route 176
Hartford	Newington	28.68	46.16		Route 287 west – Newington	Southern end of Route 287 concurrency
Hartford	Newington	28.75	46.27		Route 287 east – Wethersfield	Northern end of Route 287 concurrency
Hartford	Wethersfield	29.38	47.28		Route 175 – Newington, New Britain, Wethersfield	Interchange
Hartford	Wethersfield	30.30	48.76	Southern end of freeway section		
Hartford	Wethersfield	30.30	48.76		Route 314 east (Berlin Turnpike) to Maple Avenue	Northbound exit and southbound entrance
Hartford	Wethersfield	32.22	51.85	85	Route 99 south – Wethersfield, Rocky Hill	Northern terminus of Route 99
Hartford	Hartford	32.80– 33.19	52.79– 53.41	86-89	I-91 / Brainard Road / Airport Road (SR 530 west) to I-84 west – New Haven, New York City, Springfield	No southbound access to I-91 north; signed as exits 86 (I-91 south), 87 (Brainard Road/Airport Road) and 89 (I-91 north); exits 28 and 29 on I-91 (future exits 35B and 36)
Hartford	Connecticut River	33.97– 34.62	54.67– 55.72	Charter Oak Bridge		
Hartford	East Hartford	34.36	55.30	90	Route 2 / Route 15 north (Wilbur Cross Highway) / East River Drive (SR 502) to I-84 east (US 6 east) – Norwich, Boston	Northern end of Route 15 concurrency; no southbound access to Route 2
Hartford	East Hartford	34.36	55.30	Northern end of freeway section		
Hartford	East Hartford	35.47	57.08		I-84 west (US 6 west) – Hartford	Northbound exit only
Hartford	East Hartford	35.82	57.65		US 44 west (Connecticut Boulevard) to I-84 west (US 6 west) / I-91 north – Hartford	Southern end of US 44 concurrency
Hartford	East Hartford	36.18	58.23		US 44 east (Burnside Avenue) – Manchester	Northern end of US 44 concurrency
Hartford	South Windsor	38.63– 38.75	62.17– 62.36		I-291 / Route 30 east (Ellington Road) to I-84 – Manchester, Windsor, Rockville, Ellington	Western terminus of Route 30; exit 2 on I-291
Hartford	South Windsor	42.49	68.38		Route 194 east (Sullivan Avenue) – South Windsor, Manchester	Western terminus of Route 194
Hartford	East Windsor	44.96	72.36		Route 191 east (Phelps Road) – Broad Brook, Melrose	Western terminus of Route 191
Hartford	East Windsor	46.47	74.79		Main Street (SR 510 north)	
Hartford	East Windsor	46.73	75.20		I-91 – Hartford, Springfield	Exit 44 on I-91 (future exit 50)
Hartford	East Windsor	47.75	76.85		Route 140 (Bridge Street / North Road) – Bradley International Airport, Windsor Locks, Ellington, Broad Brook	
Hartford	Enfield	48.60	78.21		Depot Hill Road (SR 510)	Former Route 20
Hartford	Enfield	49.31	79.36		I-91 – Hartford, Springfield	Exit 46 on I-91 (future exit 52)
Hartford	Enfield	52.04– 52.09	83.75– 83.83		Route 190 east (Hazard Avenue) to I-91 – Hazardville To Route 190 west (Hazard Avenue) – Suffield	Access to Route 190 west via SR 514
Hartford	Enfield	52.61	84.67		Route 220 east (Elm Street) – East Longmeadow, MA	Western terminus of Route 220; former Route 190
Hartford	Enfield	54.25	87.31		I-91 – Hartford, Springfield	Exit 49 on I-91 (future exit 57)
Hartford	Enfield	54.59	87.85		US 5 north – Longmeadow, Springfield	Continuation into Massachusetts
1.000 mi = 1.609 km; 1.000 km = 0.621 mi: Concurrency terminus; Incomplete access; Route transition

U.S. Route 5
Previous state: Terminus	Connecticut	Next state: Massachusetts
