= Connecticut Route 174 =

State highway in Hartford County, Connecticut, US

Route 174
- Map of Hartford County in northern Connecticut with Route 174 highlighted in red

Route information
- Maintained by CTDOT
- Length: 3.18 mi (5.12 km)
- Existed: 1932–present

Major junctions
- West end: Route 9 / Route 71 / Route 72 in New Britain
- East end: Route 176 in Newington

Location
- Country: United States
- State: Connecticut
- Counties: Hartford

Highway system
- Connecticut State Highway System; Interstate; US; State; SSR; SR; Scenic
← Route 173	→ Route 175

Route 174 is a short state highway in central Connecticut, connecting Route 9 in downtown New Britain to Route 176 in Newington.

== Route description ==
Route 174 begins as East Main Street at an intersection with Route 71 in Downtown New Britain, just north of the junction of Routes 9 and 72. It heads east and immediately crosses over southbound Route 9 and under northbound Route 9 without a direct interchange, although access from southbound Route 9 to Route 174 is possible (via Route 9's Exit 28A). Route 174 continues on East Main Street for another half mile, intersecting with CTfastrak at East Main Street station, then shifts to Newington Avenue via a short segment of East Street as it heads towards the town of Newington. In Newington, the road becomes New Britain Avenue and continues east through the Elm Hill neighborhood, briefly overlapping Route 173 near Churchill Park, then continuing east to end at an intersection with Route 176 (Main Street) after another 0.4 miles (0.64 km).

A section of Route 174 in New Britain from its western terminus to East Street is designated the "Destroyer USS Braine Memorial Highway". A section in Newington from the New Britain town line to Maple Hill Avenue is designated the "Master Police Officer Peter Lavery Memorial Highway". Route 174 in Newington from Route 173 east to Route 176 is known as the "Francis Kochanowicz Memorial Highway", named for a Newington firefighter who died in a firetruck roll over en route to an emergency.

== History ==
Route 174 was established as part of the 1932 state highway renumbering and has no major changes since. It was scheduled to be turned over to the towns in the 1962 Route Reclassification Act but the city of New Britain did not want to maintain the road and the state eventually decided to retain maintenance.

== Junction list ==
The entire route is in Hartford County.

Location	mi	km	Destinations	Notes
New Britain	0.00	0.00	Route 9 south / Route 71 / Route 72 west to I-84 – Middletown, Downtown New Britain, Plainville, Bristol	Western terminus; exit 1C on Route 72 east
New Britain			Route 9 north – Newington	Exit 37B on Route 9 south
Newington	2.58	4.15	Route 173 south – New Britain, Berlin	Western end of Route 173 concurrency
Newington	2.75	4.43	Route 173 north – West Hartford	Eastern end of Route 173 concurrency
Newington	3.18	5.12	Route 176 – Hartford, Berlin, New Haven	Eastern terminus
1.000 mi = 1.609 km; 1.000 km = 0.621 mi
