= Connecticut Route 175 =

State highway in Hartford County, Connecticut, US

Route 175
- Map of Hartford County in northern Connecticut with Route 175 highlighted in red

Route information
- Maintained by CTDOT
- Length: 6.19 mi (9.96 km)
- Existed: 1932–present

Major junctions
- West end: Route 71 in New Britain
- Route 9 in Newington; US 5 / Route 15 / Berlin Turnpike at the Newington–Wethersfield line
- East end: Route 99 in Wethersfield

Location
- Country: United States
- State: Connecticut
- Counties: Hartford

Highway system
- Connecticut State Highway System; Interstate; US; State; SSR; SR; Scenic
← Route 174	→ Route 176

Route 175 is a state highway in central Connecticut, running from New Britain to Wethersfield.

== Route description ==
Route 175 begins at an intersection with Route 71 in New Britain. It heads east and north along the perimeter of Central Connecticut State University, then turns east again and intersects Route 9 at the Newington town line. In Newington, it continues east across town, intersecting with Route 173 and Route 176. At the Wethersfield town line, it meets US 5 and Route 15 (Berlin Turnpike) at a grade-separated interchange, and continues east to end at an intersection with Route 99.

== History ==
Route 175 was commissioned in 1932. The original route followed the current route to Route 176 and the current Route 176 and its former extension into Hartford along Newington Avenue. In 1940, the section north of the junction with Route 176 was transferred to Routes 176 and 176A. At the same time, Route 175 was extended east along former SR 775 to the Silas Deane Highway (then Route 9). In 1968, a section in Newington and Wethersfield was rerouted slightly to the north. Part of the old road was abandoned; the remainder was reassigned to modern SSR 405.

== Junction list ==
The entire route is in Hartford County.

Location	mi	km	Destinations	Notes
New Britain	0.00	0.00	Route 71 – West Hartford, Kensington	Western terminus
Newington	1.01	1.63	Route 9 south to Route 72 / I-84 – Middletown To Route 9 north / I-84 (US 6) – Waterbury, Hartford	Exit 38 on Route 9; access via Ella Grasso Boulevard SR 505
Newington	2.30	3.70	Route 173 – West Hartford, Berlin	
Newington	2.81	4.52	Route 176 – Elmwood, Berlin	
Newington–Wethersfield line	3.89	6.26	US 5 / Route 15 (Berlin Turnpike) – New Haven, Hartford	Interchange
Wethersfield	6.19	9.96	Route 99 – Hartford, Rocky Hill	Eastern terminus; former Route 9
1.000 mi = 1.609 km; 1.000 km = 0.621 mi
