= Connecticut Route 71 =

North-south state highway in Connecticut, US

Route 71
- Map of central Connecticut with Route 71 highlighted in red

Route information
- Maintained by CTDOT
- Length: 19.19 mi (30.88 km)
- Existed: 1932–present

Major junctions
- South end: US 5 in Wallingford
- I-691 in Meriden; Route 9 / Route 72 / Route 174 in New Britain; I-84 / US 6 in West Hartford
- North end: Route 173 in West Hartford

Location
- Country: United States
- State: Connecticut
- Counties: New Haven, Hartford

Highway system
- Connecticut State Highway System; Interstate; US; State; SSR; SR; Scenic
← Route 70	→ Route 72

Route 71 is a north–south state highway in Connecticut, running from Wallingford to West Hartford. It is the main north–south road of Meriden, Berlin and New Britain.

== Route description ==
Route 71 begins at an intersection with US 5 in Wallingford. After 0.23 miles, it joins Route 150 for a 0.13-mile (0.21 km) wrong way concurrency through the Yalesville Underpass. Route 71 resumes its northward course, entering Meriden and passing the east end of Route 70. In the center of Meriden, Route 71 becomes a pair of one way sections as it intersects West Main Street. While southbound traffic may continue from West Main Street onto Cook Avenue, northbound traffic must turn right onto Hanover Street, then left onto South Grove Street, and left onto West Main Street to continue. Once reunited, Route 71 proceeds west on West Main Street before turning north onto Chamberlain Highway. It then crosses I-691, with access to and from the west and east. It then crosses into Berlin, passing the eastern end of Route 364 before turning northeast as the Chamberlain Highway becomes Route 71A. In the Kensington section of town, it turns more northward, and intersects Route 372. It then has a junction with SR 571, a short freeway that provides access to Route 9 south and Route 372. After the SR 571 overpass, Route 71 immediately enters New Britain as it passes by New Britain Stadium. It then continues toward downtown, before meeting the east end of the Route 72 freeway as it intersects Route 9, with direct access to Route 9 south. After the overpass, it intersects the west end of Route 174. Continuing north, it intersects the west end of Route 175 before passing by Central Connecticut State University. After turning northeast, it once again intersects Route 9 with an interchange. After passing through a 0.18 mile portion of Farmington, and a 0.04 mile sliver of Newington, Route 71 enters West Hartford and becomes New Britain Avenue, where it turns east and has an interchange with, but does not cross, I-84 and US 6. Access to and from I-84 west is provided by SR 535 (Ridgewood Road). Shortly thereafter, Route 71 ends at South Main Street, as Route 173 south turns east onto New Britain Avenue to assume through traffic.

== History ==
Route 71 was established in the 1932 state highway renumbering as a route between Downtown New Britain and Hartford. In the 1920s, this was part of State Highway 113, which ran from Plainville via New Britain to Hartford. The Plainville to New Britain section became part of Route 72 (now Route 372) in 1932. In 1934, the route was modified at both ends. The northern end was truncated to end at the Colt Highway (U.S. Route 6A), roughly at the location of Exit 40 of I-84. The south end was extended to U.S. Route 5A in Meriden via Kensington along Chamberlain Highway, Bradley Avenue, and Hanover Road (former State Highway 178). In 1962, US 5A in Meriden was removed and Route 71 signed at I-84 south of West Main Street was relocated to the former US 5A alignment (Cook Avenue and Old Colony Road). In 1969, Route 71 was extended to its current northern end at Route 173 in West Hartford after US 6 was relocated to I-84 (US 6A became US 6 in the early 1940s).

Route 71 was once planned to be a freeway south from the planned southwestern Interstate 291 to the Route 72 freeway in 1961. In 1963, the state increased the planned mileage by planning the freeway to travel further north of I-291 to the Cedar Ridge Connector/Old Route 9 (remnants of which are now SR 504). The 1961 plan was built in 1986 as SR 506 but the rest of the Route 71 freeway was cancelled. In 1989, Route 9 became the southern terminus of the Route 71 freeway instead of the northern terminus. Route 9 was newly constructed west to, and extended onto the existing Route 72 freeway near Berlin and onto SR 506. The Route 72 designation was scaled back westward to the old interchange with SR 506.

== Major intersections ==
County	Location	mi	km	Destinations	Notes
New Haven	Wallingford	0.00	0.00	US 5 – Meriden, Wallingford	Southern terminus
New Haven	Wallingford	0.23– 0.36	0.37– 0.58	Route 150 – Yalesville, Meriden	
New Haven	Meriden	1.36	2.19	Route 70 west – Cheshire	Eastern terminus of Route 70
New Haven	Meriden	4.58	7.37	I-691 – Waterbury, Middletown	Exit 3 on I-691; former Route 66
Hartford	Berlin	8.40	13.52	Route 364 west – Southington	Eastern terminus of Route 364
Hartford	Berlin	9.10	14.65	Route 71A north – New Britain	Southern terminus of Route 71A
Hartford	Berlin	11.38	18.31	Route 372 – Berlin, Plainville	
Hartford	Berlin	12.15	19.55	To Route 9 south / Route 372 – Berlin, Middletown	Interchange; access via SR 571
Hartford	New Britain			To Route 9	Access via Ellis Street
Hartford	New Britain	13.85– 13.95	22.29– 22.45	Route 9 / Route 72 west / Route 174 east – Plainville, Bristol, Middletown, Newington	Western terminus of Route 174; exit 37B on Route 9 south; exit 1C on Route 72 east
Hartford	New Britain	15.01	24.16	Route 175 east – Newington	Western terminus of Route 175
Hartford	New Britain	17.33	27.89	Route 9 to I-84 (US 6) – Middletown, Waterbury, Hartford	Exit 39 on Route 9; Route 9 north not signed
Hartford	West Hartford	18.40– 18.64	29.61– 30.00	I-84 / US 6 – Waterbury, Hartford	Exit 56 on I-84
Hartford	West Hartford	19.19	30.88	Route 173 – Newington, West Hartford	Northern terminus
1.000 mi = 1.609 km; 1.000 km = 0.621 mi

== Route 71A ==
Route 71A
- Location: Berlin–New Britain
- Length: 2.92 mi (4.70 km)

Route 71A is a minor north–south spur route of Route 71 and is 2.92 miles (4.70 km) long. It begins as Chamberlain Highway at Route 71 in Berlin and heads northward along High Road, briefly overlapping Route 372. It continues into New Britain, where it becomes Kensington Avenue, and ends half a mile later at an intersection with Buell Street. The road continues beyond Buell Street as Kensington Avenue. Route 71A originally extended further north to connect back to Route 71 but was truncated to its present end in 1995. Some signage for Route 71A still exists north of the official northern terminus.
