= Connecticut Route 314 =

State highway in Hartford County, Connecticut, US

Route 314
- Map of Hartford County in northern Connecticut with Route 314 highlighted in red

Route information
- Maintained by CTDOT
- Length: 2.07 mi (3.33 km)
- Existed: 1963–present

Major junctions
- West end: US 5 / Route 15 / Berlin Turnpike in Wethersfield
- East end: Route 99 in Wethersfield

Location
- Country: United States
- State: Connecticut
- Counties: Hartford

Highway system
- Connecticut State Highway System; Interstate; US; State; SSR; SR; Scenic
← Route 313	→ Route 315

Route 314 is a state highway in central Connecticut running entirely within Wethersfield.

== Route description ==
Route 314 begins at an interchange from US 5 and Route 15 in northwest Wethersfield. It briefly heads north as part of the Berlin Turnpike, then turns east onto Jordan Lane, passing under US 5 and Route 15 again without an interchange, before ending at an intersection with Route 99. The section of Route 314 from SR 543 to the eastern terminus is designated the Antranig Ozanian Memorial Highway.

== History ==
Route 314 was commissioned in 1963 from portions of SR 543 (Berlin Turnpike north of US 5/Route 15) and SR 759 (Jordan Lane), and has had no significant changes since.

== Junction list ==
The entire route is in Wethersfield, Hartford County.

mi	km	Destinations	Notes
0.00	0.00	US 5 south / Route 15 south (Berlin Turnpike) – New Haven	Western terminus
0.69	1.11	Berlin Turnpike (SR 543 north) – Hartford	
2.07	3.33	Route 99 – Rocky Hill, Hartford	Eastern terminus; former Route 9
1.000 mi = 1.609 km; 1.000 km = 0.621 mi
