= Connecticut Route 173 =

State highway in Hartford County, Connecticut, US

Route 173
- Map of Hartford County in northern Connecticut with Route 173 highlighted in red

Route information
- Maintained by CTDOT
- Length: 6.17 mi (9.93 km)
- Existed: 1932–present

Major junctions
- South end: US 5 / Route 15 / Berlin Turnpike in Newington
- North end: I-84 / US 6 / South Main Street in West Hartford

Location
- Country: United States
- State: Connecticut
- Counties: Hartford

Highway system
- Connecticut State Highway System; Interstate; US; State; SSR; SR; Scenic
← Route 172	→ Route 174

Route 173 is a Connecticut state highway in the southern and western suburbs of Hartford, running from Newington to West Hartford.

== Route description ==
Route 173 begins at an intersection with the Berlin Turnpike (US 5 and Route 15) in Newington and briefly heads west on Richard Street before turning north onto Willard Avenue. It briefly overlaps with Route 174 and meets Route 175 before continuing into West Hartford, where it becomes Newington Road. In Elmwood Center, it turns west onto New Britain Avenue, and turns north again onto South Main Street as it meets the northern end of Route 71, onto which New Britain Avenue continues. It intersects I-84 shortly before ending at an intersection with Hooker Drive.

A section of Route 173 in West Hartford from the Newington town line to SR 529 is designated the Roger Fissette Hannon-Hatch VFW Post 9929 Memorial Highway. A section from SR 529 to South Main Street in West Hartford is designated the Trooper Carl P. Moller Memorial Highway.

== History ==
Route 173 was commissioned in 1932. It originally went using South Quaker Lane to Farmington Avenue (then Route 4) in West Hartford. In 1962, Route 173 was truncated to end at Route 71. However, in 1969, it was re-extended slightly to I-84 along South Main Street (former SR 569) via a short overlap with Route 71.

== Junction list ==
The entire route is in Hartford County.

Location	mi	km	Destinations	Notes
Newington	0.00	0.00	US 5 / Route 15 (Berlin Turnpike) – New Haven, Hartford	Southern terminus
Newington	1.15	1.85	Route 174 west – New Britain	Southern end of Route 174 concurrency
Newington	1.32	2.12	Route 174 east – Hartford	Northern end of Route 174 concurrency
Newington	2.64	4.25	Route 175 – New Britain, Wethersfield	
West Hartford	5.16	8.30	New Britain Avenue (SR 529 east)	
West Hartford	5.84	9.40	Route 71 south – New Britain	Northern terminus of Route 71
West Hartford	6.07	9.77	I-84 / US 6 – Hartford, Waterbury	Exit 57 on I-84
West Hartford	6.17	9.93	South Main Street	Continuation north
1.000 mi = 1.609 km; 1.000 km = 0.621 mi: Concurrency terminus
