= Connecticut Route 40 =

State highway in New Haven County, Connecticut, US

Route 40
- Mount Carmel Connector
- Map of New Haven County in southern Connecticut with Route 40 highlighted in red

Route information
- Maintained by CTDOT
- Length: 3.08 mi (4.96 km)
- Existed: 1976–present

Major junctions
- South end: I-91 / Bailey Road in North Haven
- US 5 in North Haven
- North end: Route 10 / Route 22 in Hamden

Location
- Country: United States
- State: Connecticut
- Counties: New Haven

Highway system
- Connecticut State Highway System; Interstate; US; State; SSR; SR; Scenic
← Route 39	→ Route 41

Route 40, also known as the Mount Carmel Connector, is a 3.08-mile (4.96 km) freeway connecting Interstate 91 (I-91) and Bailey Road in North Haven, Connecticut to Route 10 in the Mount Carmel neighborhood of Hamden. Route 40 is a four-lane freeway with one intermediate exit leading to/from U.S. Route 5 (US 5) in North Haven. It crosses over Route 15 (Wilbur Cross Parkway) but does not have an interchange with it. This is the only place in the state where two freeways cross without an interchange.

== Route description ==
Route 40 begins at an interchange with I-91 in North Haven as a continuation of Bailey Road. The I-91 interchange includes an overpass over the Quinnipiac River and railroad tracks. About 0.3 miles (0.48 km) past the I-91 interchange, the road crosses over another set of railroad tracks, then has an interchange with US 5 and Dixwell Avenue (SR 717). The road then continues through a rock cut where it crosses over the Wilbur Cross Parkway without an interchange about 0.6 miles (0.97 km) from the US 5 junction. The road soon enters the town of Hamden, where it crosses over the Mill River and closely parallels Route 22 for the rest of its alignment. Route 40 ends at a traffic light with Whitney Avenue (Route 10).

Route 40 in Hamden is also known as the Edward Armeno Memorial Highway, named after a Hamden police officer.

== History ==
Plans for the Mount Carmel Connector first appeared in Tri-State Transportation Commission's recommendations of 1962. This was not acted upon for several years until the Connecticut Highway Department put up the proposal again in 1967. Originally the Mount Carmel Connector was to be part of the freeway relocation of Route 10 to exit 29 of I-84 in Southington. These plans were never implemented, however.

The Mount Carmel Connector was opened in 1972 from I-91 to Dixwell Avenue and State Street (US 5) in North Haven. It was first given an unsigned designation of State Road 724. The freeway was extended north to Whitney Avenue (Route 10) in Hamden in 1976, at which time it was given the designation Route 40. Originally, Route 40 was planned to extend further southeast beyond I-91 to connect with I-95 in Branford.

== Exit list ==
The entire route is in New Haven County.

Exit numbers on Route 40 were switched from sequential to mile-based in 2024 as part of a sign and structural supports replacement project.

Location	mi	km	Old exit	New exit	Destinations	Notes
North Haven	0.00	0.00	–	1B	Bailey Road	Continuation east
North Haven	0.00	0.00	–	1A-C	I-91 – Hartford, New Haven	Signed as exits 1A (I-91 north) and 1C (I-91 south) Exit 10 on I-91 (future exit 6)
North Haven	1.15	1.85	1	1D	US 5 (State Street) / Dixwell Avenue (SR 717 west) – North Haven, Hamden	Signed as exit 1 westbound; North Haven, Hamden not signed
Hamden	3.08	4.96	–	–	Route 10 / Route 22 east – Hamden, Mount Carmel	Northern terminus; at-grade intersection; western terminus of Route 22
1.000 mi = 1.609 km; 1.000 km = 0.621 mi: Incomplete access
