= Charter Oak Bridge =

Bridge in Connecticut, United States

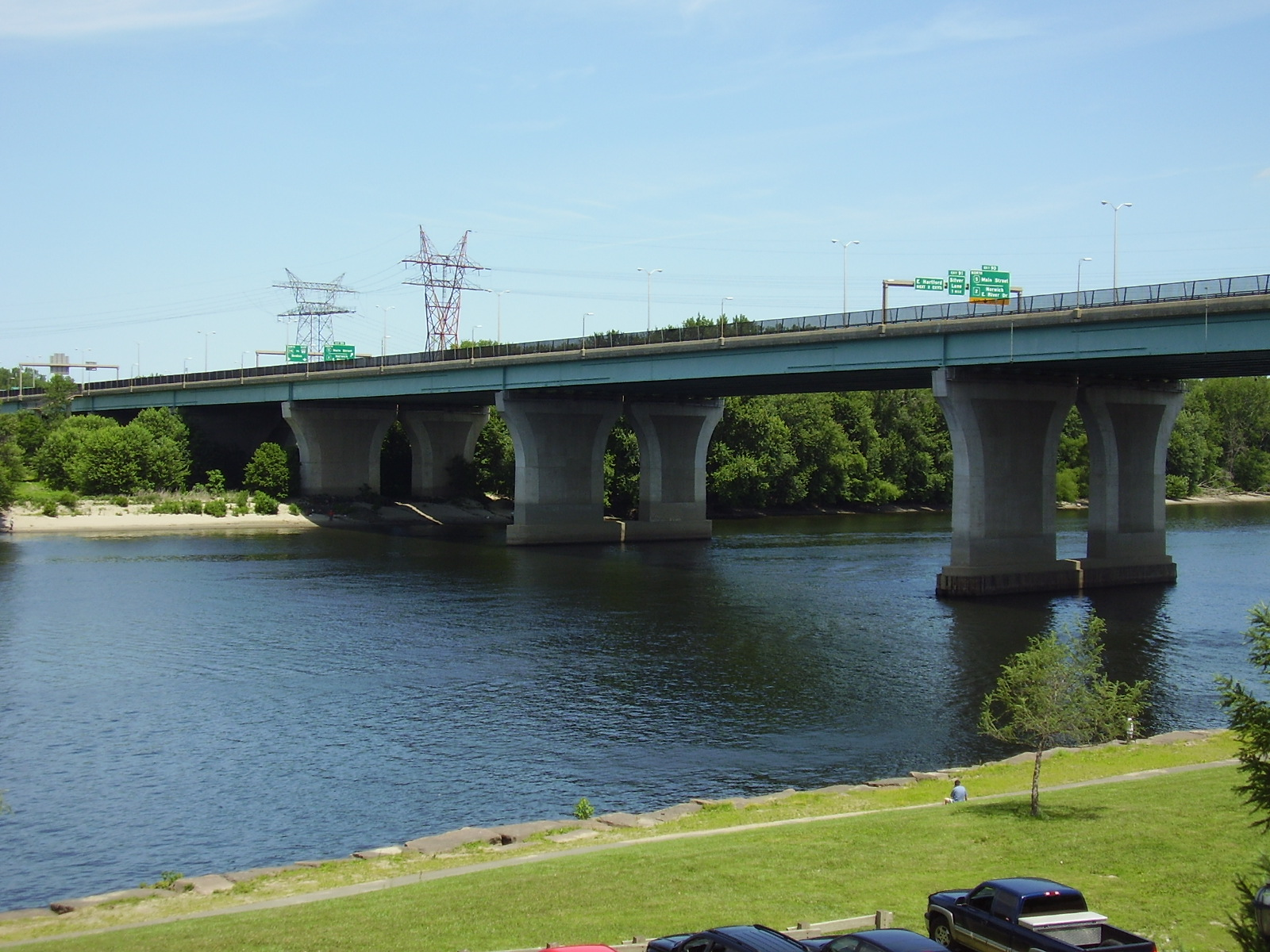
- Coordinates: 41°45′11.6″N 72°39′13.53″W
- Carries: 6 lanes of US 5 / Route 15
- Crosses: Connecticut River
- Locale: Hartford, Connecticut, and East Hartford, Connecticut
- Official name: Charter Oak Bridge
- Maintained by: Greater Hartford Bridge Authority (1942–1989); Connecticut Department of Transportation (1989–present)

Characteristics
- Design: stringer/multibeam or girder
- Total length: 3372.0 ft (1027.8 m)
- Width: 47.9 ft (14.6 m)
- Clearance below: 69 ft (21 m)

History
- Opened: 1991 (current span; original bridge opened in 1942)

Location
- Interactive map of Charter Oak Bridge

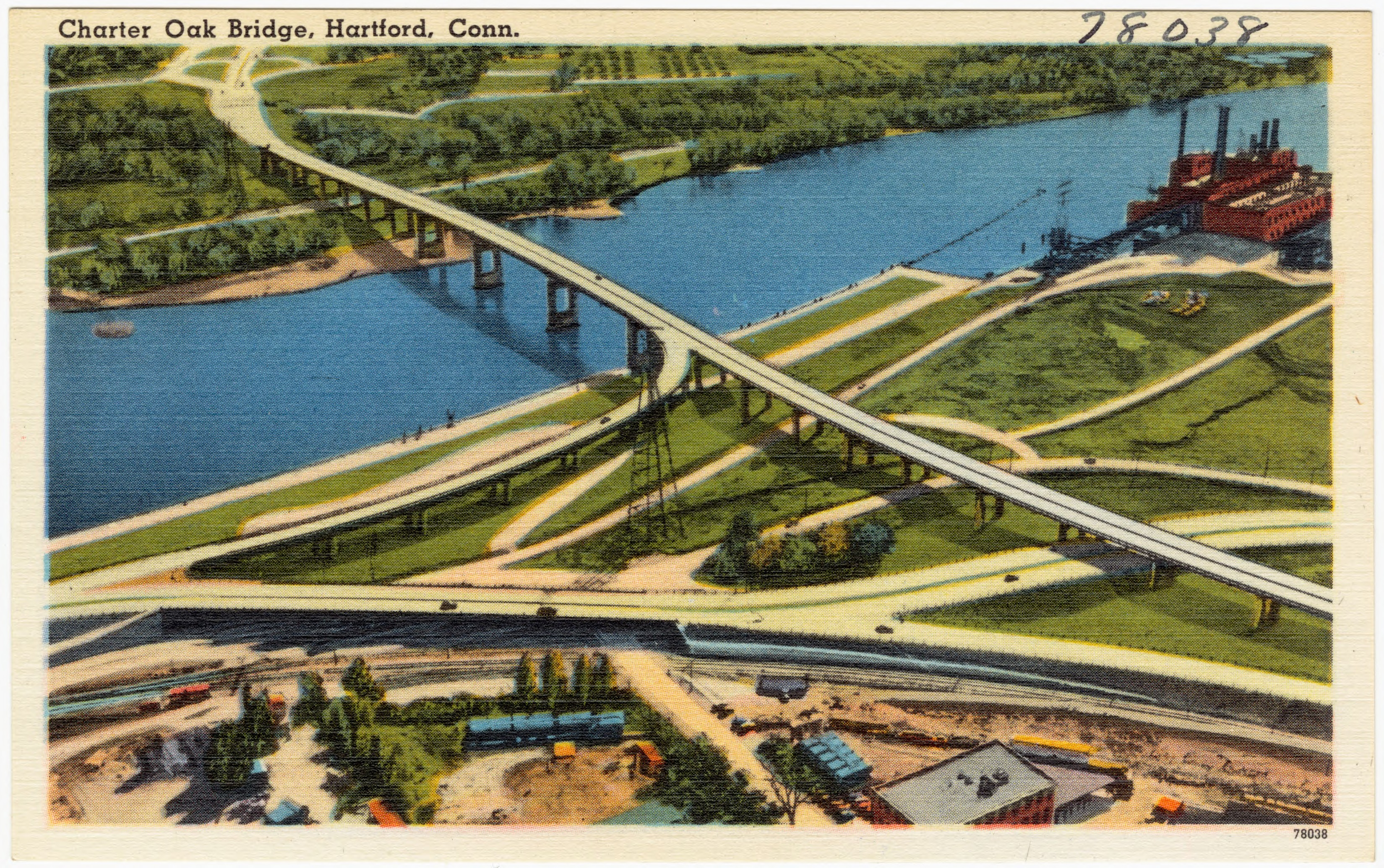
A postcard of the old bridge

The Charter Oak Bridge is one of the three highway bridges over the Connecticut River between Hartford, Connecticut, and East Hartford, Connecticut. The twin steel stringer bridge carries the Wilbur Cross Highway (US 5/Route 15) over the river.

Named for Connecticut's famed Charter Oak, the original crossing opened as a toll bridge in the early 1940s, allowing through traffic to pass south of downtown Hartford. It was replaced by the current bridge in 1991, which is free to motorists. It has an average daily traffic of 79,800 motorists.

== History ==
The first motor vehicle bridge across the Connecticut River at Hartford was the Bulkeley Bridge, which opened in 1908. In 1929 the Connecticut General Assembly passed an act creating a commission to study the need for a second bridge. The outcome was a proposed new bridge from Main and Pitkin Streets in East Hartford to Wyllys Street at Wethersfield Avenue in Hartford. In 1931 the commission hired a design consultant. The new design was an 800 feet (240 m) suspension span, with the eastern end shifted south to Main Street and Silver Lane. The project went to bid in 1933 and would cost $4.4 million. However, the Great Depression struck, banks were closed, and nothing further was done with the bridge until the decade was nearly over.

With the opening of the Merritt Parkway in 1940 and the construction of the Wilbur Cross Highway underway, the General Assembly authorized a new bridge commission, this time for a toll bridge that would carry the area's first expressways across the Connecticut River. The commission studied several sites and arrived at a Silver Lane to Wawarme Avenue alignment. In late 1940, construction began.

On December 4, 1941, disaster struck, when a 222 feet (70 m) section of the Charter Oak Bridge fell into the Connecticut River during construction. Sixteen men fell to their deaths in the icy river, and 606 tons of steel, including a 176-ton derrick, plummeted into the water. One body was never recovered. Sixteen other men were rescued by the Hartford fire department.

Engineers later determined that the bridge section, erected over the water from the Hartford side, fell as a result of movement in the falsework, the temporary steel and wood structure used to support the bridge girders until enough had been erected to reach the next pier. The temporary support structure moved as a result of a shift in the unstable varved clay under the river. Despite the disaster, the bridge's builder, the American Bridge Company, ordered new steel the same day the bridge fell, and it was completed on time.

The four-lane Charter Oak Bridge and approach highways opened to traffic on September 5, 1942. Tolls were collected in both directions at a plaza in East Hartford. When the 3,016 feet (920 m) bridge opened, it was the longest continuous plate girder bridge in the country.

In 1948, the designation of state Route 15 was changed, to include a continuous planned expressway, complete in many places, from Greenwich to Union. This included the Merritt Parkway, the Berlin Turnpike, and the Charter Oak Bridge, forming at the time Connecticut's most advanced, prominent highway. The bridge carries US 5 to this day along with Route 15, but also carried U.S. Route 6 from 1943 to 1970.

=== A New Bridge ===
As traffic increased and the planned beltways (I-291 and I-491) were reduced in scope or cancelled entirely, the state paid particular attention to the overworked I-84/I-91 interchange and surrounding highways. What eventually came out of this was added responsibility for the Charter Oak Bridge; it would take over the connections previously served by the Founders Bridge and two tight ramps to I-91. At the same time, the Charter Oak was showing its age, both in materials and roadway design.

After considering alternatives such as widening or adding a parallel span, the state decided to build a new bridge immediately to the south, and dismantle the old one. Work began in 1988 and the new bridge, free of tolls, opened to traffic on August 8, 1991, at a cost of $204 million. The original bridge was demolished after the new span was opened. The Charter Oak Landing park was created on the footprint of the original bridge along the west bank of the Connecticut River. One of the original bridge piers was preserved as a gateway into Charter Oak Landing.

The new 3,400 feet (1,040 m) plate-girder bridge has several spans measuring 215 feet (70 m) in length, and has a vertical clearance of 69 feet (20 m) above the Connecticut River. It includes six lanes, two shoulders and a protected pedestrian walkway on its north side.

=== Approach Improvement Project ===
On June 9, 2015, Governor Dannel Malloy announced a five-year, $200 million construction project to rebuild the interchange between US-5/CT-15 and I-91 at the west end of the bridge. Although the interchange was rebuilt during the late 1980s and early 1990s along with the Charter Oak Bridge and the US-5/CT-15 portions of the Wilbur Cross Highway, traffic along the section has increased significantly since the reconstruction and the removal of the two connector ramps between I-91 and the Founders Bridge (CT-2), which is located further north, closer to Downtown Hartford. The Charter Oak Bridge took over these connections following its replacement in 1991, and became the main southeast bypass of Hartford for traffic traveling on I-91 and I-84. The project includes the replacement of the single-lane on-ramp from I-91 Northbound to CT-15 Northbound (Exit 29) with a double-lane ramp and the separation of the I-91 and CT-15 carriageways, which currently weave with each other for one mile approaching the interchange. These upgrades will improve connections between I-91 and I-84 The Charter Oak Bridge itself is not being replaced as part of the I-91/US-5/CT-15 interchange project. However, it is being rehabilitated to extend its service life, to include a new median barrier, repair and resurfacing of the bridge deck, and some widening of the bridge on the western end to accommodate the new ramps to and from I-91.

== See also ==
- List of crossings of the Connecticut River
