= Wharton Brook State Park =

State park in New Haven County, Connecticut

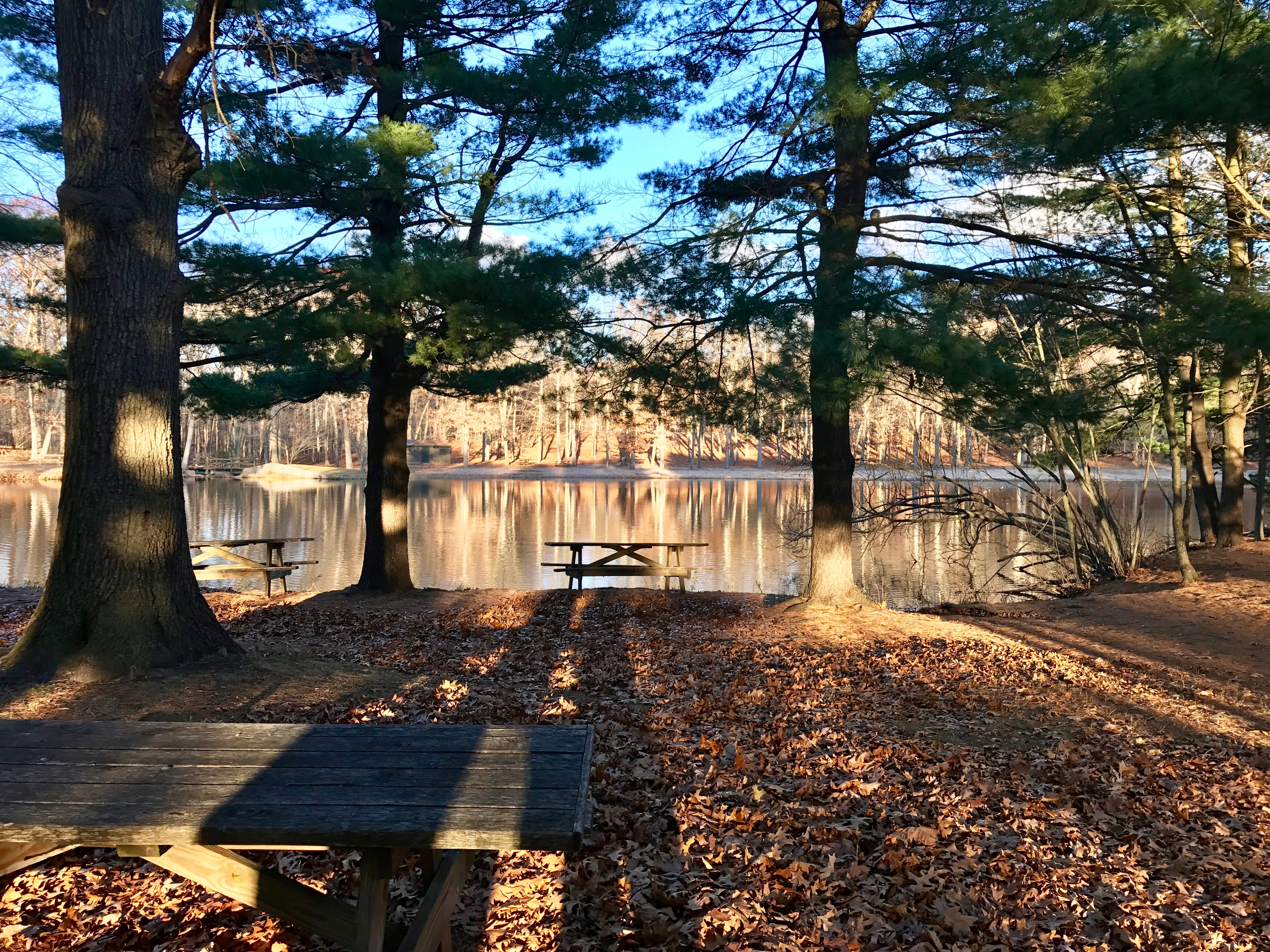
- Allen Brook Pond in Wharton Brook SP at dusk

- Location within Connecticut Location within the United States
- Location: North Haven and Wallingford, Connecticut, United States
- Coordinates: 41°25′38″N 72°50′08″W
- Area: 96 acres (39 ha)
- Elevation: 26 ft (7.9 m)
- Established: 1918
- Administrator: Connecticut Department of Energy and Environmental Protection
- Designation: Connecticut state park
- Website: Official website

Wharton Brook State Park is a public recreation area located off U.S. Route 5 in the towns of North Haven and Wallingford, Connecticut. Activities in the 96-acre (39 ha) state park center on Allen Brook Pond, a 5-acre (2.0 ha) pond that empties into Wharton Brook. The park is managed by the Connecticut Department of Energy and Environmental Protection.

== History ==
The state park was established as a precursor of the modern highway rest stop, with picnic grounds, a camping area, and services for automobiles. It opened on August 1, 1919, as the first of what the State Park Commission intended to be a series of "Wayside Parks" created in the more heavily traveled areas of the state.

On May 15, 2018, an EF1 tornado that transitioned into a microburst caused significant damage to the park, forcing officials to close the park. It reopened in 2019.

== Activities and amenities ==
The park offers fishing, swimming, picnicking, and several short footpaths totaling less than a mile in distance. The park is one of the state's designated trout parks that are stocked with trout on opening day and at other times of the year. Great blue herons and other wildlife may be found in the park.
