= Yalesville Underpass =

Coordinates: 41.4977°N 72.8144°W

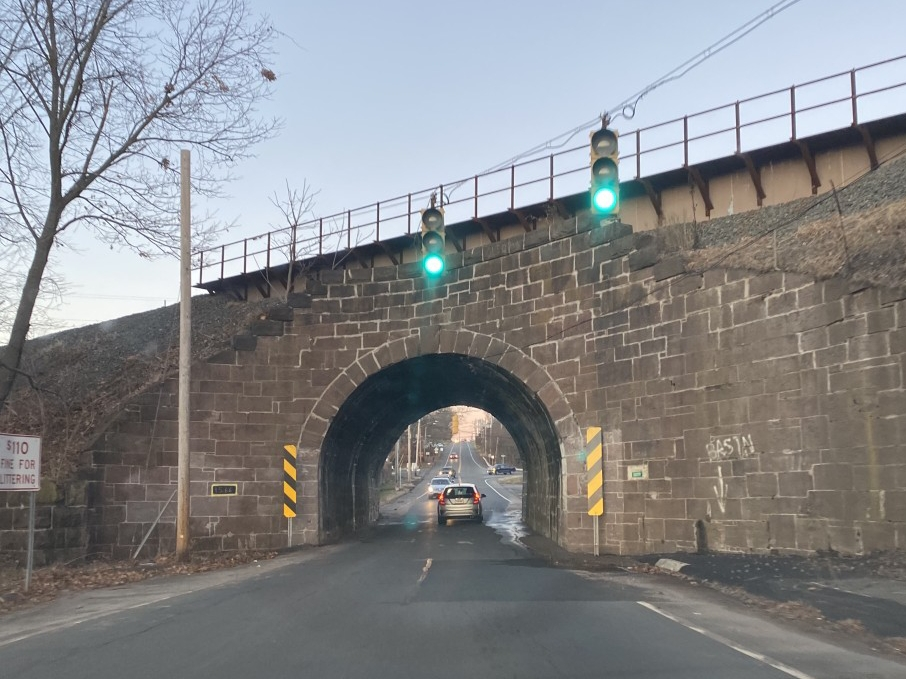

The Yalesville Underpass is a 30-degree skew arch bridge that carries the railroad over Route 150 and Route 71 in Wallingford, Connecticut. Built in 1838 for the Hartford and New Haven Railroad by William MacKenzie, it is reported to be the first skew underpass in America. The arch was designed to allow tall hay wagons to pass through, but it is not wide enough for modern two-way traffic; as a result, the one-way traffic being controlled by a pair of traffic lights. Due to the bridge’s age, it has to undergo repairs on a regular basis.

In 2018, work was carried out to accommodate an additional train track.
