= Connecticut Route 99 =

State highway in central Connecticut, US

Route 99
- Map of central Connecticut with Route 99 highlighted in red

Route information
- Maintained by CTDOT
- Length: 10.64 mi (17.12 km)
- Existed: 1969–present

Major junctions
- South end: Route 9 in Cromwell
- I-91 in Rocky Hill
- North end: US 5 / Route 15 / Wethersfield Avenue in Wethersfield

Location
- Country: United States
- State: Connecticut
- Counties: Middlesex, Hartford

Highway system
- Connecticut State Highway System; Interstate; US; State; SSR; SR; Scenic
← Route 97	→ Route 100

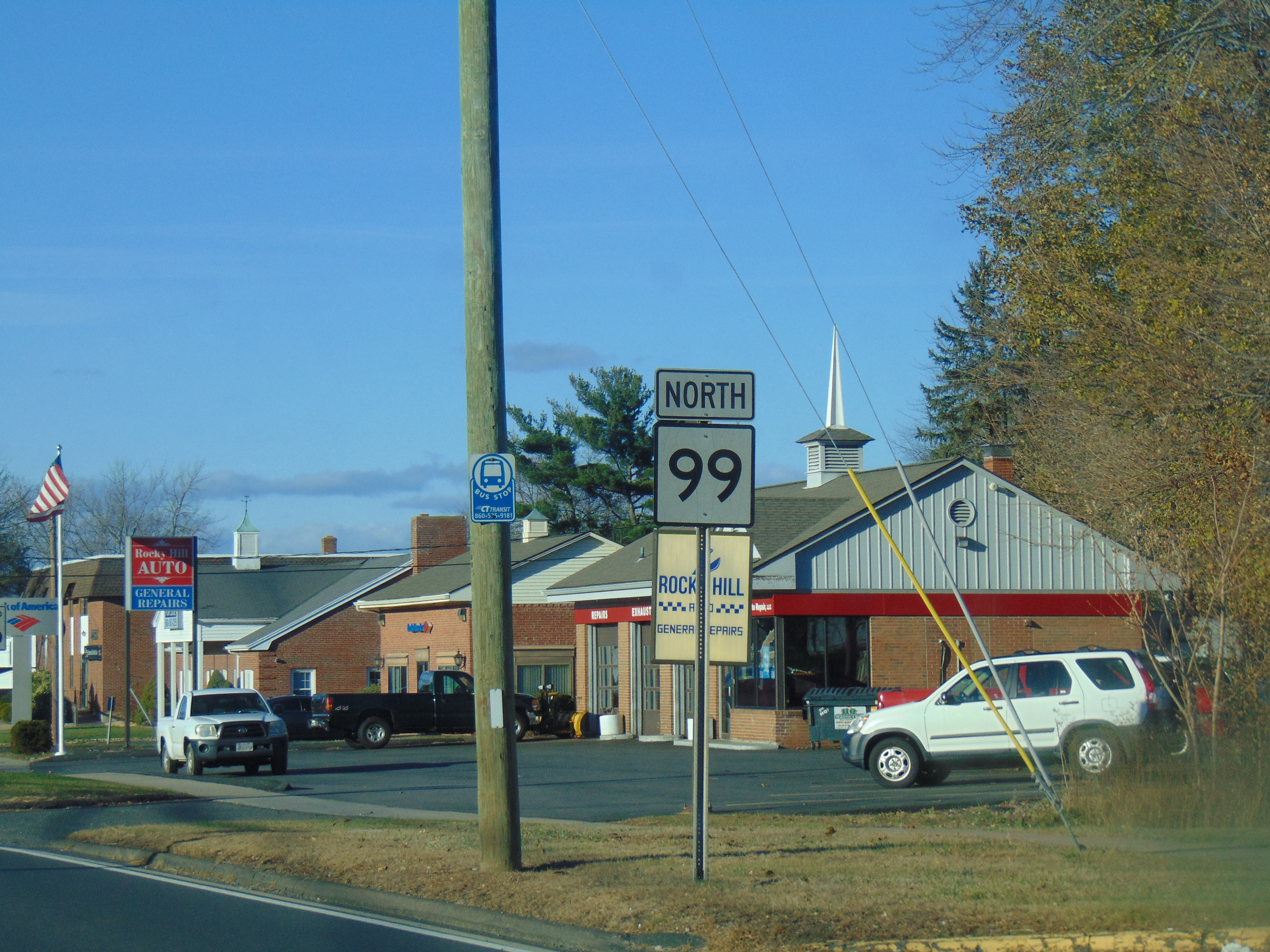
Route 99 in Rocky Hill

Route 99 is a state highway in Connecticut running for 10.64 miles (17.12 km) from Route 9 in Cromwell, through the town of Rocky Hill, ending in Wethersfield at the Hartford city line. The road continues into Hartford as a local road (Wethersfield Avenue). It follows the former alignment of Route 9 from prior to that route's upgrade to a freeway.

== Route description ==
Route 99 begins as the northbound Exit 25 ramp of Route 9 in Cromwell. At the end of the off ramp, the road continues north as Main Street. (Access from Main Street to the southbound on-ramp for Route 9 is designated as State Road 901). Main Street is a two-lane road that goes north through Cromwell up to Rocky Hill for about 5.6 miles (9.0 km). At the junction with Elm Street (Route 160), the road becomes a four-lane road known as the Silas Deane Highway. The Silas Deane Highway continues through Rocky Hill up to the town of Wethersfield. It serves as the main thoroughfare of these two towns, also providing access to several shopping centers. Route 99 has interchanges with Interstate 91 in Rocky Hill and the Wilbur Cross Highway (Route 15) in Wethersfield. At the Hartford city line, Route 99 ends but the road continues into downtown Hartford as Wethersfield Avenue.

The entire length of Route 99 is also known as the George Washington Memorial Highway.

== History ==
The alignment of Route 99 was originally designated as part of New England Interstate Route 10 in the 1920s. The Silas Deane Highway was built in 1930 and New England Route 10 was shifted slightly west to use the new highway. In the 1932 state highway renumbering, the alignment was re-designated as Route 9. When Route 9 was upgraded to an expressway between I-91 and I-95 in 1969, the old surface alignment became Route 99.

== Junction list ==
County	Location	mi	km	Destinations	Notes
Middlesex	Cromwell	0.00	0.00	Route 9 south – Old Saybrook	Southern terminus; exit 25 on Route 9 north
Middlesex	Cromwell	0.97	1.56	Route 372 west – Berlin	Eastern terminus of Route 372
Hartford	Rocky Hill	5.19	8.35	West Street (SSR 411)	To Dinosaur State Park
Hartford	Rocky Hill	5.94	9.56	Route 160 – Berlin, South Glastonbury	South Glastonbury via Rocky Hill-Glastonbury Ferry (April 1–November 30)
Hartford	Rocky Hill	7.25	11.67	I-91 – Hartford, New Haven	Exit 31 on I-91
Hartford	Wethersfield	8.48	13.65	Route 3 – Glastonbury, Rocky Hill	
Hartford	Wethersfield	9.03	14.53	Route 175 west – Newington	Eastern terminus of Route 175
Hartford	Wethersfield	10.33	16.62	Route 314 west (Jordan Lane)	Eastern terminus of Route 314
Hartford	Wethersfield	10.50	16.90	US 5 / Route 15 (Wilbur Cross Highway) / I-91 – Hartford, New Haven	Same-directional access only; no northbound entrance; exit 71 on Route 15
Hartford	Wethersfield–Hartford line	10.64	17.12	Wethersfield Avenue	Continuation north
1.000 mi = 1.609 km; 1.000 km = 0.621 mi: Incomplete access
