= Connecticut Route 15 =

State highway in Connecticut, US

Route 15

Route information
- Maintained by CTDOT
- Length: 83.53 mi (134.43 km)
- Existed: 1932 (relocated 1948)–present
- Restrictions: No commercial vehicles south of exit 64A

Major junctions
- South end: Hutchinson River Parkway at the New York state line in Glenville
- US 7 in Norwalk; Route 25 in Trumbull; Route 8 / Route 108 in Trumbull; Milford Parkway in Milford; US 5 in Wallingford; I-91 in Meriden; I-691 in Meriden; US 5 in Meriden; Route 9 / Route 372 in Berlin; I-91 in Hartford; US 5 / Route 2 in East Hartford
- North end: I-84 / US 6 in East Hartford

Location
- Country: United States
- State: Connecticut
- Counties: Fairfield, New Haven, Hartford

Highway system
- Connecticut State Highway System; Interstate; US; State; SSR; SR; Scenic
← Route 14	→ Route 16

Route 15 is a state highway in the U.S. state of Connecticut that runs 83.53 miles (134.43 km) from a connection with New York's Hutchinson River Parkway in Greenwich, Connecticut, to its northern terminus intersecting with Interstate 84 (I-84) in East Hartford, Connecticut. Route 15 consists of four distinct sections: the Merritt Parkway, the Wilbur Cross Parkway (both freeways), most of the Berlin Turnpike, and part of the Wilbur Cross Highway. The unified designation was applied to these separate highways in 1948 to provide a continuous through route from New York to Massachusetts. The parkway section of Route 15 is often referred to locally as "The Merritt".

== Route description ==
=== Merritt Parkway ===
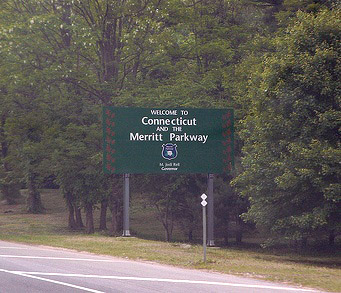
Signage at the state line in Greenwich

Route 15 begins at the New York border, where the Hutchinson River Parkway continues southwest towards New York City, at the New York State Route 120A interchange in the village of Rye Brook, in the town of Rye, New York. The highway comes into the state of Connecticut, continuing as the Merritt Parkway, a four-lane controlled-access parkway with low bridges, sharp curves, and a tree-filled median, that passes through the affluent urbanized areas of southern Fairfield County. Commercial vehicles are prohibited on this section of Route 15. The parkway heads into the town of Greenwich, where it passes a service plaza in both directions and curves north-northwest, before heading northeast and meeting interchanges at Round Hill Road, providing access to Downtown Greenwich, and at Lake Avenue. From there, Route 15 turns northeast, and curves through its interchange with North Street, which provides another outlet into Downtown Greenwich. Past this interchange, the parkway enters the city of Stamford, where it crosses over the Mianus River within the Mianus River State Park, before reaching an interchange with Route 104 in the residential areas of North Stamford, providing access to Downtown Stamford and the University of Connecticut Stamford Campus. Route 15 continues to an interchange with Route 137 before the route leaves Stamford.

The parkway comes into the town of New Canaan, where it crosses the Noroton River within its interchange with Route 106, adjacent to the Talmadge Hill station on the New Canaan Branch of the Metro-North Railroad's New Haven Line, located to the southeast of the interchange. Afterwards, Route 15 passes under the New Canaan Branch and curves around to meet an interchange for Route 124 before reaching the New Canaan Service Plaza. After crossing the Fivemile River, the parkway enters the city of Norwalk and immediately comes to an interchange with Route 123, which provides access to the Norwalk Community College. Just past its crossing of the Silvermine River, Route 15 meets the U.S. Route 7 (US 7) freeway at an incomplete interchange before it crosses over the Danbury Branch of the New Haven Line just south of the Merritt 7 station, and the Norwalk River and comes to a cloverleaf interchange with Main Avenue which provides the missing movements between the parkway and US 7. From there, Route 15 continues northeast through residential areas in the neighborhood of Cranbury before it leaves Norwalk, after crossing over Route 53 without an interchange.

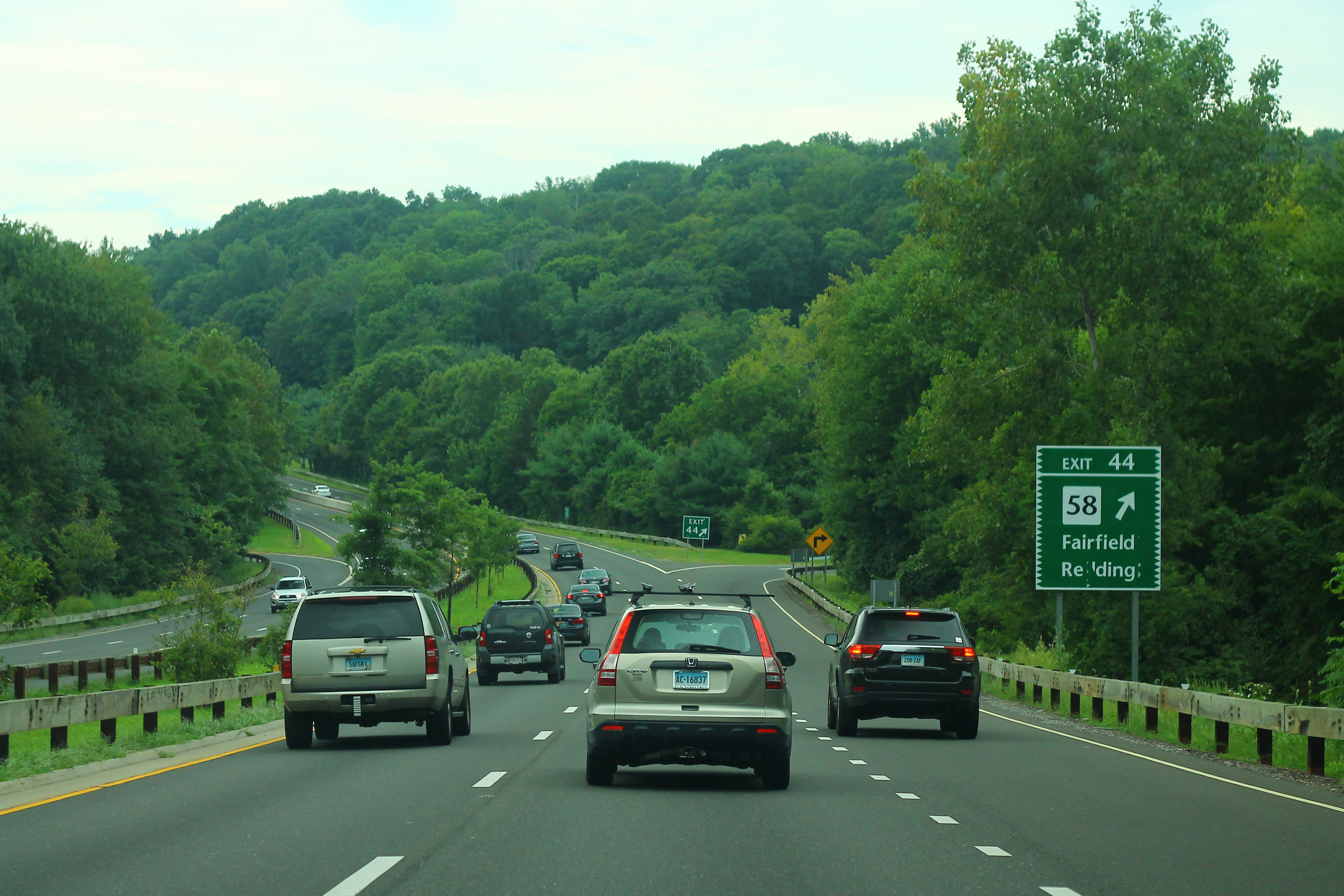
Traveling Merritt Parkway south Route 58 Black Rock Turnpike at exit 44 (now exit 27) in Fairfield

The parkway enters the town of Westport, where it crosses over the Saugatuck River, and comes to right-in/right-out interchanges with Route 33, just east of the town line. Route 15 turns to the northeast again, upon reaching its interchange with Route 57, that has a park and ride lot serving the town of Westport in its northwest corner. Immediately after this interchange, the parkway crosses over Route 136 with no access and enters its longest stretch without exits, where it passes more wooded residential areas and comes into the town of Fairfield, where it meets its next interchange, 5.5 miles (8.9 km) later, at Route 58, which also has a park and ride lot, located in its southeastern corner. Route 58 provides access to both Fairfield Center and the campus of Fairfield University. Route 15 crosses the Mill River, passes service plazas in both directions, and then meets Route 59 at a pair of right-in/right-out interchanges. Route 59 provides access to the headquarters of General Electric. The parkway turns east-northeast and enters the town of Trumbull at its interchange with Park Avenue, which provides access to the campus of Sacred Heart University just to the southwest of the road, as well as the campus of the University of Bridgeport in the adjacent city of Bridgeport. Route 15 then reaches a single-point urban interchange with Route 111, adjacent to the Westfield Trumbull shopping mall, in its southwestern corner. The parkway meets the Route 25 freeway at an incomplete turbine interchange, which provides access to the Beardsley Zoo in Bridgeport, and the route crosses the Pequonnock River within the interchange. Past Route 25, Route 15 reaches a southbound exit and northbound entrance for Route 127 and then a full interchange for Route 108, in tandem with stack interchange with the Route 8 freeway.

Route 15 comes into the town of Stratford through more wooded suburban areas, and reaches an interchange with Route 110 at the northeastern edge of town. Past this interchange, the parkway runs due east to cross the Igor Sikorsky Memorial Bridge over the Housatonic River where it leaves both Stratford and Fairfield County. Route 15 enters both Milford and New Haven County, coming to a modified trumpet interchange with the Milford Parkway which provides access to both the I-95 freeway and US 1, north of Downtown Milford. At this point, the Merritt Parkway ends and Route 15 turns northeast again through the wooded residential areas of southwestern New Haven County.

=== Wilbur Cross Parkway ===
The next component of Route 15, the Wilbur Cross Parkway, begins at the Milford Parkway junction. The Wilbur Cross Parkway follows the same general configuration and landscape as the Merritt Parkway, continues with the Merritt Parkway's exit numbers, and excludes commercial vehicles from its use, too. A few miles after the Milford Parkway, Route 15 comes into the town of Orange, where it passes a bi-directional service plaza, and meets Route 121 at a pair of right-in/right-out ramps, which provides access to the Orange campus of the University of New Haven. Now running north-northeast, Route 15 continues to a cloverleaf interchange with Route 34 which provides access eastbound to the Yale Bowl, in the city of New Haven. The parkway crosses the Wepawaug River, where it turns northeast and enters the town of Woodbridge, passing under Route 114 without access. Route 15 again crosses a boundary and comes into New Haven, where it meets an interchange with Route 69/Route 63 that provides access to the campus of Southern Connecticut State University, in the neighborhood of Amity, crossing the West River within the interchange.

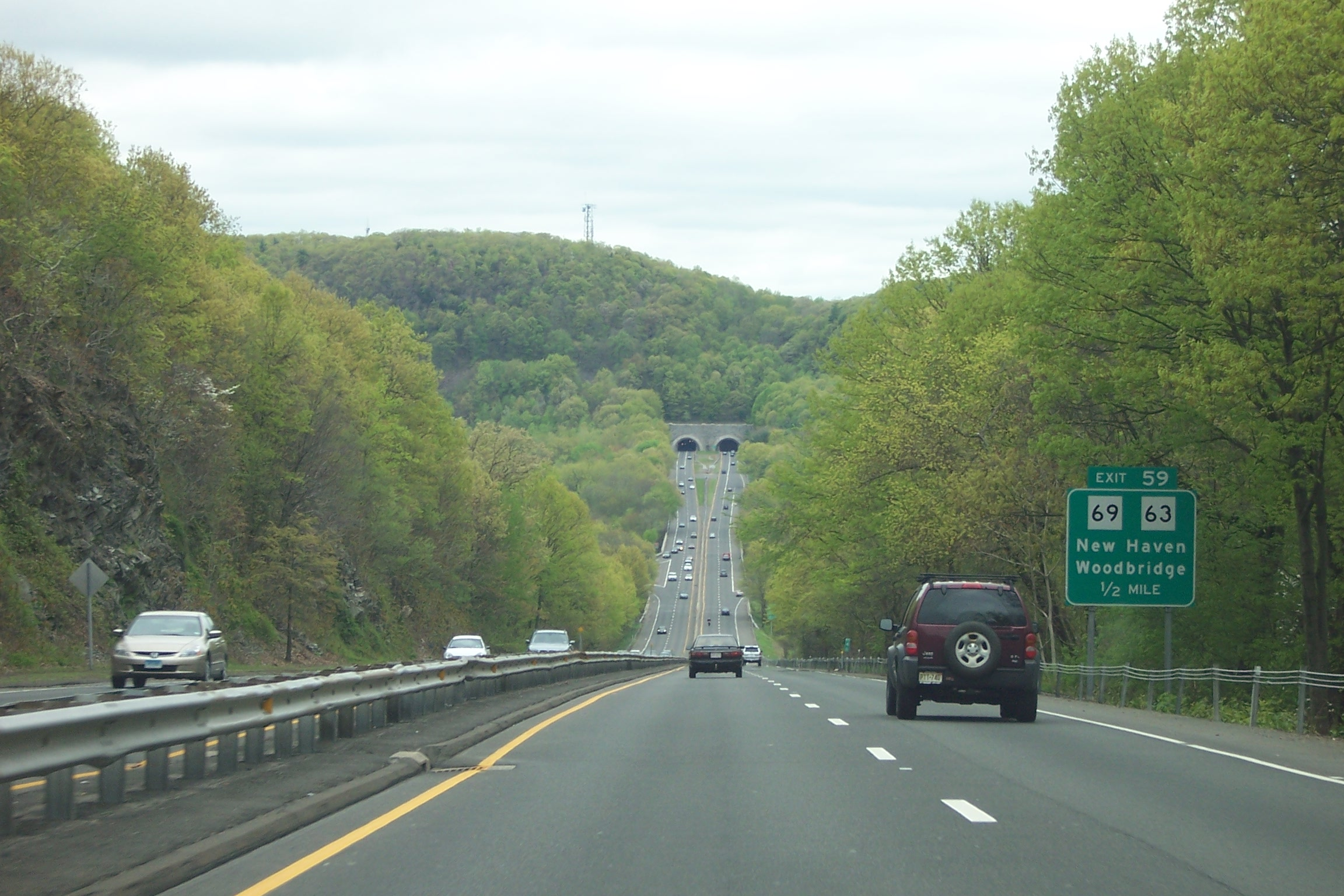
Traveling Wilbur Cross Parkway north toward exit 59 (now exit 46) and the West Rock Tunnel, dubbed "Heroes Tunnel" by the Connecticut legislature in 2003

From here, the parkway briefly crosses back through the southeastern corner of Woodbridge, before coming back into New Haven, and entering Heroes Tunnel which passes under West Rock Ridge State Park. Immediately after exiting the tunnel, Route 15 comes into the town of Hamden, where it heads into a mix of residential and commercial areas around its interchange with Route 10. The parkway then enters the town of North Haven, where it crosses the Mill River and passes under the Route 40 freeway as the only freeway crosspath in the state without an interchange, over East Rock. A short distance later, the parkway meets an interchange with Route 22 and continues northeast to the last pair of service plazas on the route. Past the plazas, Route 15 turns north-northeast along the western edge of the Quinnipiac River State Park, where the route enters the town of Wallingford. In Wallingford, the parkway has exits to Quinnipiac Street providing access to Gaylord Specialty Healthcare and the Wallingford station on Amtrak and ConnDOT's Hartford Line, as well as Route 150 that provides access to the Masonicare Health Center. Route 15 crosses the Quinnipiac River and turns northeast, where it comes to an interchange for US 5, where it also crosses the Hartford Line.

Route 15 continues northeast into the city of Meriden and passes entrances to the ConnDOT maintenance facilities. The parkway continues a short distance before reaching an interchange complex on the east side of town. First, Route 15 crosses over the I-91 freeway, where it turns north to reach a southbound exit and northbound entrance, before meeting East Main Street, which provides access to the Wesleyan University campus, where the Interstate begins to run inside the median. The parkway widens to six lanes through here, then reaches the next exits for northbound I-91 with a northbound exit and southbound entrance, as well as a northbound exit and southbound entrance to and from the westbound direction of the I-691 freeway, where there is also access from westbound I-691 to the northbound Wilbur Cross Parkway. Past I-691, Route 15 narrows back to four lanes, and turns north-northwest before heading north-northeast again, where the Wilbur Cross Parkway ends and northbound US 5 merges with northbound Route 15 to head toward the suburban areas of Greater Hartford.

=== Berlin Turnpike ===
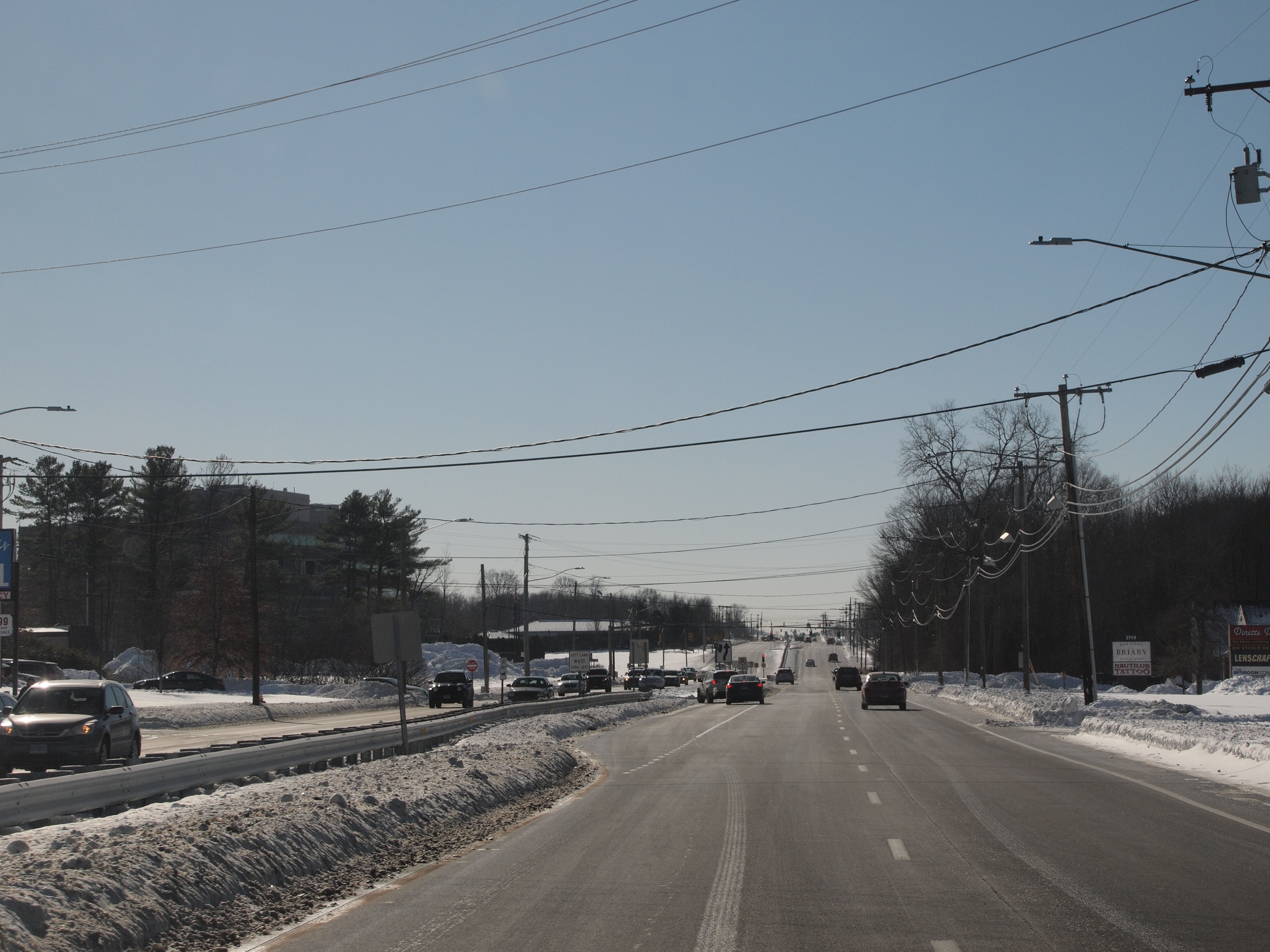
Berlin Turnpike in Newington

Route 15 continues onto a four-lane arterial road concurrent with US 5, known as the Berlin Turnpike, running between Silver Lake to the west and Lamentation Mountain to the east. Here, it passes along a commercial strip before passing areas of residence. The highway enters the town of Berlin and Hartford County, and briefly forms the western edge of Lamentation Mountain State Park, before heading back into commercial areas. An old alignment of the Berlin Turnpike, splits to the west, while US 5/Route 15 curves to its interchange with the Route 9 freeway and Route 372, in which all access besides the ramps from US 5/Route 15 to southbound Route 9 and from southbound Route 9 to US 5/Route 15 is made via Route 372. North of Route 9, the old alignment of the Berlin Turnpike rejoins the new road briefly, before splitting again, this time to the east. The highway crosses the Mattabesset River before intersecting the western terminus of Route 160. US 5/Route 15 passes rows of shopping centers, as it comes into the town of Newington, intersecting the southern terminus of Route 173, which heads north towards the town of West Hartford. The highway continues to its junction with the southern terminus of Route 176, which heads north towards the center of Newington. A park and ride lot is located in the northeastern corner of this intersection, with Griswoldville Avenue. From here, US 5/Route 15 passes the ConnDOT headquarters on the east, prior to reaching the intersections with Route 287. The highway leaves Newington at its interchange with Route 175, which heads west towards the center of town and east towards the town of Wethersfield.

After the Route 175 interchange, US 5/Route 15 enters Wethersfield and passes more commercial areas before reaching the partial interchange with Route 314. The Berlin Turnpike splits and continues north-northeast along Route 314, narrowing to a two-lane undivided road, until it reaches the Hartford city line, continuing into that city as Maple Avenue. US 5/Route 15 exits onto a four-lane freeway that heads northeast towards I-91 as a controlled-access outlet into Hartford.

=== Wilbur Cross Highway ===
Past Route 314, US 5/Route 15 continues onto the Wilbur Cross Highway, a four-lane freeway with a jersey barrier in the middle. The highway passes through wooded urbanized areas, to the southeast of the Connecticut Department of Labor headquarters, before it comes to an interchange with the northern terminus of Route 99, in which the overpass that carries the two routes over that route and the Providence and Worcester Railroad's Connecticut Valley Railroad line is called the Clinton "Jiggs" Hughes Memorial Bridge. Next, US 5/Route 15 comes into Hartford, turns north-northeast at an interchange with I-91, where there are ramps from northbound and southbound US 5/Route 15 to southbound I-91, and from northbound I-91 to northbound I-91 to southbound US 5/Route 15. The next interchange at Brainard Road/Airport Road with access to Hartford-Brainard Airport, has no southbound exit. The highway continues through industrial areas and comes exits from the southbound Wilbur Cross Highway to Southbound I-91, as well as an exit from the northbound Wilbur Cross Highway and northbound I-91 that also provides access to westbound I-84.

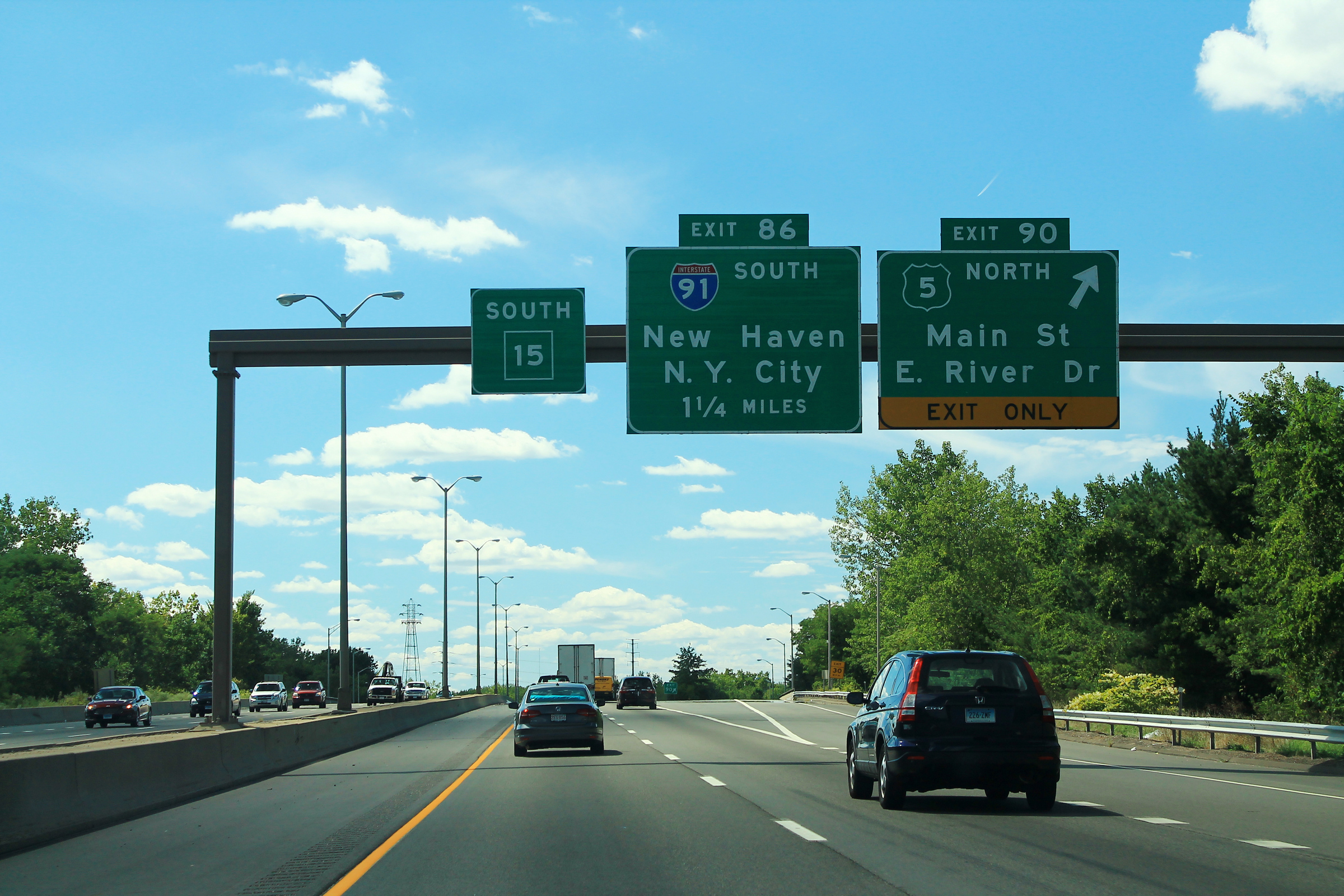
Route 15 southbound at the Route 5 and I-91 exit in Hartford

From here, US 5/Route 15 crosses over the Connecticut River on the Charter Oak Bridge, where the routes enter the town of East Hartford. On the other side of the bridge, there is an interchange serving Route 2, where northbound US 5 splits and exits Route 15 onto Main Street, which runs north through the center of East Hartford. Route 15 curves to a northbound exit and southbound entrance with Silver Lane, before the highway reaches its northern terminus and merges onto eastbound I-84 and US 6. A dedicated connection also exists between Route 15 and I-84/US 6's high-occupancy vehicle lanes. The Wilbur Cross Highway continues northeast along I-84 towards Interstate 90/Massachusetts Turnpike in Sturbridge, Massachusetts.

== History ==
The Route 15 designation was created as part of the 1932 state highway renumbering and originally ran from New Haven through Middletown, East Hartford and Stafford Springs to the Massachusetts state line in Union. The original route used the pre-expressway alignment of modern Route 17 to Glastonbury, Main Street to East Hartford center, US 5 to the junction with Route 30, then modern Route 30 to Stafford, then modern Route 190 to Union, and modern Route 171 to the Massachusetts state line.

=== Wilbur Cross Parkway ===
The Wilbur Cross Parkway is named after Wilbur Lucius Cross, a former governor of the state (1931–1939). The parkway was originally planned in 1937 as route from US 1 in Milford to the Massachusetts state line in Union. The portion of the parkway south of Meriden was built largely as planned. Construction began in 1939 when federal funds were secured. The first section of the parkway to open was the Milford to Orange segment, from the Housatonic River to Route 34 at the end of 1941. Subsequent construction was delayed by World War II. After the war, two more sections of the parkway opened: the segment from US 5 in Wallingford to US 5 in Meriden, bypassing the city center opened in 1946; and the segment from Route 10A in Hamden to US 5 in Wallingford opened in 1947. In 1948, a portion of the Wilbur Cross Parkway between Route 34 and Whitney Avenue had still been under construction. Route 15 was temporarily routed along Route 34, Sherman Avenue (former US 5 and Route 10), Henry Street/Munson Street/Hillside Place/Edwards Street (former US 5), and Whitney Avenue (former Route 10A).

By 1949, the Wilbur Cross Parkway was completed and the temporary Route 15 designation was removed from the surface streets. Because the New Haven segment had not yet been completed, motorists were directed to temporarily follow Route 34, US 5, and Route 10A. In November 1949, the New Haven segment, including the West Rock Tunnel opened.

The entire parkway was a toll road when it opened in 1941. Tolls were removed from both the Merritt and Wilbur Cross Parkways in 1988. Reflecting its history as a toll road, two pairs of service plazas lie opposite one-another along the parkway where the tolls once stood, in Orange and North Haven. Both have been renovated since 2011, along with six further south on the Merritt Parkway. In addition to gas pumps and an Alltown convenience store at each plaza, they now include Dunkin' Donuts and Subway shops. Prior to the renovations, no fast-food service had been available at any of the plazas. Three abandoned rest areas remain along the parkway, in Woodbridge, New Haven, and Meriden.

In 1943, a newly constructed two-lane highway (now the Wilbur Cross Highway) between Tolland and Union was opened to traffic. Route 15 was relocated on this new highway and the former Route 15 between Route 74 and Route 190 (then part of Route 20) was redesignated as Route 30. By 1948, the rest of the old two-lane Wilbur Cross Highway to East Hartford had also opened, connecting to the Charter Oak Bridge and the Hartford Bypass. In 1948, the State Highway Department decided to relocate Route 15 to a series of roadways, namely the Merritt Parkway, Wilbur Cross Parkway, Berlin Turnpike, Hartford Bypass, Charter Oak Bridge, and the new Wilbur Cross Highway, creating a modern, high-speed throughway from the New York state line to the Massachusetts state line. The Route 15 designation was applied to the previously unnumbered parkways from Greenwich to Meriden, then overlaid with US 5 through East Hartford, then designated on the western half of the Wilbur Cross Highway to Tolland, connecting with the portion previously designated as Route 15 five years before. The former Route 15 between South Windsor and Tolland was reassigned as an extension of Route 30, and the former Route 15 between New Haven and Glastonbury became redesignated as Route 17.

Further improvements in the Wilbur Cross Highway took place over the next several years and the road became a four-lane divided highway by 1954. In 1968, most of the Wilbur Cross Highway was designated as I-86 and further upgrades to the road were implemented. Route 15 and I-86 overlapped from the current 15/84 junction in East Hartford to the Massachusetts state line. In 1984, the overlap was removed, truncating Route 15 to its current northern end, while at the same time I-86 was redesignated as I-84.

== Junction list ==
Exits were converted to mileage-based exit numbering in 2025.

County	Location	mi	km	Old exit	New exit	Destinations	Notes
Fairfield	Greenwich	0.00	0.00			Hutchinson River Parkway south – New York City	Continuation into New York
Fairfield	Greenwich	0.05	0.080	27	19B	NY 120A north (King Street) – Armonk, NY	Access to NY 120A south via Hutchinson River Parkway; exit 19A; Armonk not signed northbound; exit number corresponds to Hutchinson River Parkway
Fairfield	Greenwich	3.39	5.46	28	3	Round Hill Road	To Greenwich Business District
Fairfield	Greenwich	4.16	6.69	29	4	Lake Avenue	
Fairfield	Greenwich			30		Butternut Hollow Road	At-grade intersection; intersection closed 1955
Fairfield	Greenwich	5.71	9.19	31	5	North Street	To Greenwich Business District
Fairfield	Stamford	8.89	14.31	33	8	Den Road	Right-in/right-out connections only
Fairfield	Stamford	9.22	14.84	34	9	Route 104 (Long Ridge Road)	To Downtown Stamford and University of Connecticut Stamford Campus
Fairfield	Stamford	10.40	16.74	35	10	Route 137 (High Ridge Road)	
Fairfield	New Canaan	13.15	21.16	36	13	Route 106 (Old Stamford Road)	
Fairfield	New Canaan	13.89– 14.10	22.35– 22.69	37	14	Route 124 – New Canaan, Darien	
Fairfield	Norwalk	16.01	25.77	38	16	Route 123 (New Canaan Avenue)	To Norwalk Community College
Fairfield	Norwalk	16.87– 17.31	27.15– 27.86	39	16-17A	US 7 – Norwalk, Danbury	Northbound exit and southbound entrance; exit 3 on US 7; redesign in proposal stage
Fairfield	Norwalk	17.53– 17.63	28.21– 28.37	40	17	Main Avenue (SR 719) to US 7 – Norwalk, Danbury	Signed for US 7 southbound, Main Avenue northbound; signed as exits 17B and 17C northbound, exits 17A and 17B southbound
Fairfield	Westport	20.73	33.36	41	20	Route 33 – Westport, Wilton	
Fairfield	Westport	21.59	34.75	42	21	Route 57 (Route 136) – Westport, Weston	Route 136 not signed
Fairfield	Fairfield	26.95	43.37	44	27	Route 58 – Fairfield, Redding	To Fairfield Business District and Fairfield University
Fairfield	Fairfield	28.58	46.00	46	28	Route 59 – Fairfield, Easton	To West Campus of Sacred Heart University; access via SR 713/SR 726
Fairfield	Trumbull	29.31	47.17	47	29	Park Avenue	To University of Bridgeport and Sacred Heart University
Fairfield	Trumbull	30.37	48.88	48	30	Route 111 (Main Street)	Southern terminus of Route 111; single-point urban interchange
Fairfield	Trumbull	31.64– 32.69	50.92– 52.61	49	31–32	Route 25 – Bridgeport, Danbury	No southbound access to Route 25 south; exit 5 on Route 25; signed as exits 31 and 32 northbound, exit 32A southbound
Fairfield	Trumbull	32.99	53.09	50	32B	Route 127 – Trumbull	Southbound exit and northbound entrance
Fairfield	Trumbull	33.51	53.93	51	33	Route 108 (Nichols Avenue)	Northbound exit and southbound entrance
Fairfield	Trumbull	33.77– 34.57	54.35– 55.64	52	34	Route 8 / Route 108 – Bridgeport, Waterbury	No northbound access to Route 8 south/Route 108; exits 5 and 6 on Route 8
Fairfield	Stratford	36.54	58.81	53	36	Route 110 – Stratford, Shelton	
Housatonic River		37.53	60.40	Igor I. Sikorsky Memorial Bridge			
New Haven	Milford	37.67	60.62	54	37	To I-95 / US 1 – Milford, New London	Access via Milford Parkway south and exits 3A and 3B on Milford Parkway north
New Haven	Milford	37.67	60.62	Transition between Merritt and Wilbur Cross Parkways			
New Haven	Milford	38.14– 38.66	61.38– 62.22	55	38	Wheelers Farms Road	Signed as exit 38A northbound
New Haven	Milford	38.14– 38.66	61.38– 62.22	55B	38B	Wolf Harbor Road	Northbound exit only
New Haven	Orange	41.32	66.50	56	41	Route 121 – Orange	
New Haven	Orange	42.69– 43.00	68.70– 69.20	57-58	42A-B	Route 34 – New Haven, Derby	Cloverleaf interchange; signed as exits 42A (Route 34 east) and 42B (Route 34 west)
New Haven	New Haven	46.57– 46.70	74.95– 75.16	59	46	Route 69 / Route 63 – New Haven, Woodbridge	Southern Connecticut State University signed northbound
New Haven	Woodbridge	47.20– 47.43	75.96– 76.33	Heroes Tunnel (formerly West Rock Tunnel)			
New Haven	Hamden	50.00	80.47	60	50	Route 10 – Hamden, New Haven	New Haven not signed northbound; Southern Connecticut State University signed southbound
New Haven	Hamden	51.72	83.24	61	51	Whitney Avenue (SR 707) – Hamden, New Haven	Signed as exits 52 Hamden and 51 New Haven southbound
New Haven	Hamden	51.82– 52.15	83.40– 83.93	62	52	Dixwell Avenue (SR 717)	Northbound exit and entrance
New Haven	North Haven	53.45	86.02	63	53	Route 22 – North Haven	
New Haven	Wallingford	58.17	93.62	64	58A	Wallingford	No northbound entrance; access via Quinnipiac Street
New Haven	Wallingford	58.55	94.23	65	58B	Route 150 – Yalesville	
New Haven	Wallingford	61.12– 61.26	98.36– 98.59	66	61	US 5 – Wallingford, Meriden	
New Haven	Meriden	63.02	101.42		62	ConnDOT Maintenance Facility	Access via Miller Avenue
New Haven	Meriden	64.05	103.08	67S	64A	I-91 south – New Haven, New York City	Southbound exit and northbound entrance; exit 19B on I-91 north; all trucks must exit
New Haven	Meriden	64.25	103.40		64A	I-91 north – Hartford	Northbound exit only; opened on September 9, 2026
New Haven	Meriden	64.33	103.53	67	64B	East Main Street	Signed for Wesleyan University
New Haven	Meriden	64.63	104.01	68N-E	65A	I-91 north / Route 66 east – Hartford, Middletown	Northbound exit and southbound entrance; exit 19B on I-91 south
New Haven	Meriden	64.95	104.53	68W	65B	I-691 west – Meriden, Waterbury	No southbound exit; exit 1B on I-691 east
New Haven	Meriden	66.89	107.65	Transition between Wilbur Cross Parkway and Berlin Turnpike			
New Haven	Meriden	66.89	107.65			US 5 (North Broad Street) to I-691 / Route 66	Southern end of US 5 concurrency; southbound exit and northbound entrance
New Haven	Meriden	66.89	107.65	Northern end of freeway section			
Hartford	Berlin	71.38– 71.63	114.87– 115.28			Route 9 / Route 372 – Middletown, New Britain, East Berlin	Interchange; exits 31 and 32 on Route 9
Hartford	Berlin					Worthington Ridge Road (SR 572 south)	
Hartford	Berlin	72.76	117.10			Route 160 east – Rocky Hill	Western terminus of Route 160
Hartford	Newington	74.26	119.51			Route 173 north – West Hartford	Southern terminus of Route 173
Hartford	Newington	74.88	120.51			Route 176 north – Newington	Southern terminus of Route 176
Hartford	Newington	76.27	122.74			Route 287 west – Newington	Southern end of Route 287 concurrency
Hartford	Newington	76.34	122.86			Route 287 east – Wethersfield	Northern end of Route 287 concurrency
Hartford	Wethersfield	76.87	123.71			Route 175 – Newington, New Britain, Wethersfield	Interchange
Hartford	Wethersfield	77.89	125.35	Southern end of freeway section			
Hartford	Wethersfield	77.89	125.35			Route 314 east (Berlin Turnpike) to Maple Avenue	Northbound exit and southbound entrance
Hartford	Wethersfield	77.89	125.35	Transition between Berlin Turnpike and Wilbur Cross Highway			
Hartford	Wethersfield	79.65	128.18	85	79	Route 99 south – Wethersfield, Rocky Hill	Rocky Hill not signed northbound; northern terminus of Route 99
Hartford	Hartford	80.05– 81.31	128.83– 130.86	86-89	80A-81	I-91 / Brainard Road / Airport Road / I-84 west – New Haven, New York City, Springfield	No southbound access to I-91 north; access via (SR 530) signed as exits 80A (I-91 south), 80B (Brainard Road/Airport Road) and 81 (I-91 north); exits 35B and 36 on I-91
Hartford	Connecticut River	81.90	131.81	Charter Oak Bridge			
Hartford	East Hartford	81.95	131.89	90	82	US 5 north (Main Street) / Route 2 / East River Drive – Norwich	Northern end of US 5 concurrency; access via (SR 502) no southbound access via Route 2, signed at exit 83 southbound
Hartford	East Hartford	82.74	133.16	91	83	Silver Lane (SR 502)	Northbound exit and southbound entrance
Hartford	East Hartford	83.53	134.43			I-84 east / US 6 east – Boston	Northern terminus; exit 64A on I-84 west
1.000 mi = 1.609 km; 1.000 km = 0.621 mi: Concurrency terminus; Incomplete access; Route transition; Unopened
