= Berlin Turnpike =

Arterial road in Connecticut, U.S.

Berlin Turnpike

- Map of central Connecticut with Berlin Turnpike highlighted in red

Route information
- Maintained by ConnDOT
- Length: 12.17 mi (19.59 km)
- Existed: 1909–present
- Component highways: US 5 / Route 15 from Meriden to Wethersfield; Route 314 in Wethersfield; SR 543 (unsigned) in Wethersfield

Major junctions
- South end: US 5 / Route 15 / Wilbur Cross Parkway in Meriden
- Route 9 / Route 372 / SR 572 in Berlin; US 5 / Route 15 in Wethersfield
- North end: Maple Avenue at the Wethersfield–Hartford line

Location
- Country: United States
- State: Connecticut
- Counties: New Haven, Hartford

Highway system
- Connecticut State Highway System; Interstate; US; State; SSR; SR; Scenic

The Berlin Turnpike is a 12.17-mile (19.59 km) major thoroughfare carrying U.S. Route 5 (US 5) and Route 15 in New Haven County and Hartford County in the U.S. state of Connecticut. The road begins one mile south of the Meriden–Berlin town line where Route 15 on the Wilbur Cross Parkway merges with US 5 along North Broad Street in Meriden and terminates at the Wethersfield–Hartford town line. The local name of the street varies as it passes through multiple towns.

1.07 miles (1.72 km) south of the Hartford city line, US 5 and Route 15 leave the turnpike and follow the Wilbur Cross Highway northeast through Hartford towards the Charter Oak Bridge. The Berlin Turnpike continues north as a two-lane undivided road as part of Route 314 for 0.69 miles (1.11 km), and then as SR 543 for 0.38 miles (0.61 km) before entering Hartford as the municipally-maintained Maple Avenue.

== Route description ==
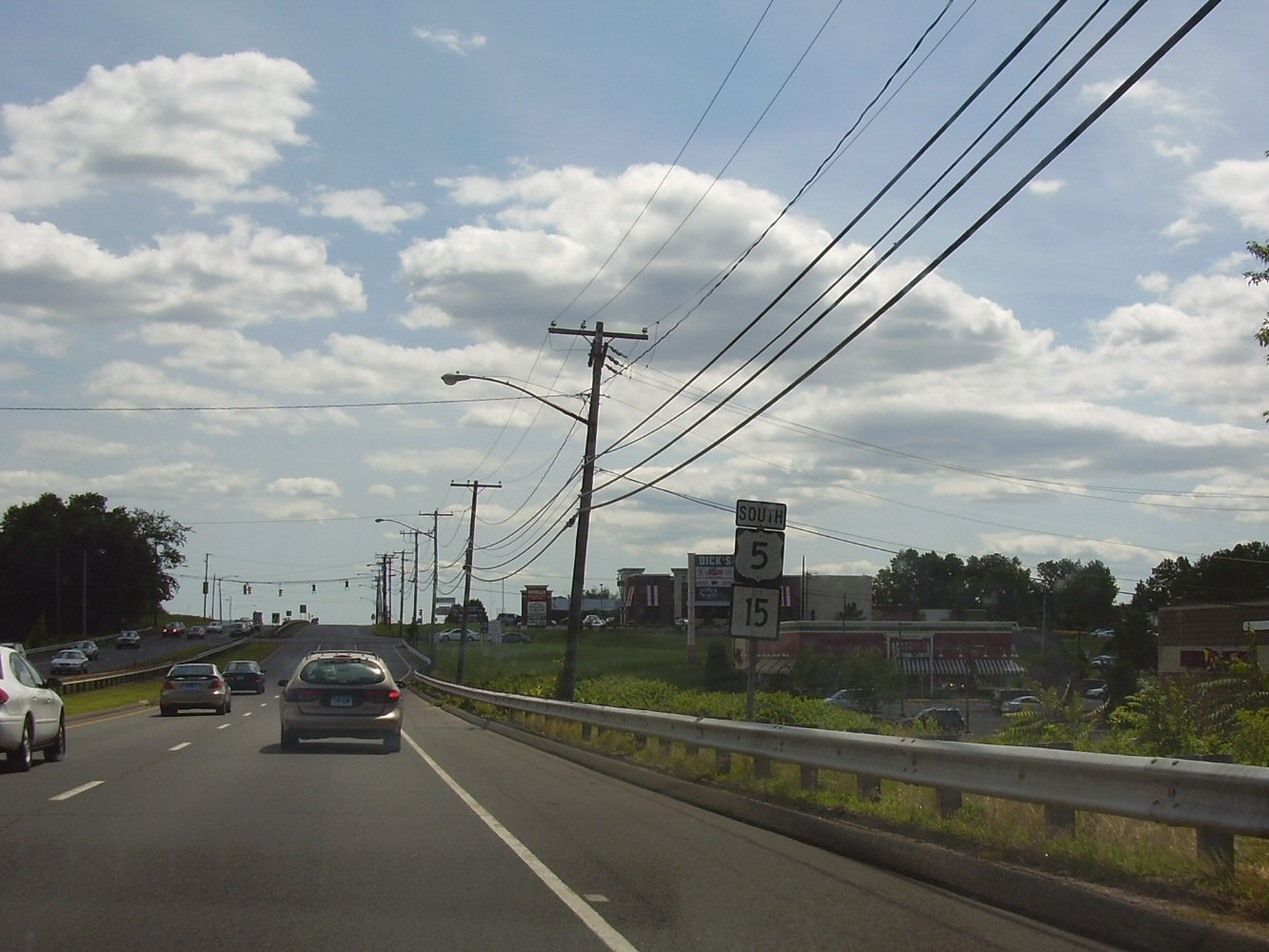
A view of the Berlin Turnpike

The Berlin Turnpike begins at a fork interchange between Route 15, which continues south as the controlled-access Wilbur Cross Parkway, and US 5, which continues south as a local road named Broad Street. The turnpike is the only segment of Route 15 that is not a freeway, as it is an arterial road with multiple at-grade intersections, some with traffic lights, as well as businesses on both sides of the road. The turnpike has grade-separated interchange with Route 9 and Route 372 in Berlin, as well as Route 175 on the border between Newington and Wethersfield.

In Wethersfield, US 5 and Route 15 leave the turnpike for the controlled-access Wilbur Cross Highway heading towards Hartford. This is the western terminus of Route 314, which takes a right turn onto Jordan Lane soon after to actually proceed in the eastbound direction. From Jordan Lane to the city line, the turnpike is unsigned SR 543. At the city line, the road becomes Maple Avenue and continues north towards Downtown Hartford.

=== Speeding issues ===
The long straight trajectory of the Berlin Turnpike has allowed it to become prone to excessive speeding and deadly accidents. In June 2007, a driver was clocked driving at a speed of 97 miles per hour (156 km/h), despite a posted speed limit of 50 miles per hour (80 km/h).

== History ==
The Hartford and New Haven Turnpike was a toll road chartered in 1798 and built in 1798-99 to connect the cities of New Haven and Hartford in the U.S. state of Connecticut. The turnpike was built to connect the courthouses of New Haven and Hartford in as straight a route as was allowed by the terrain. Its southern terminus was at Grove Street, which forms the northern boundary of the original nine squares of New Haven. The road's straight line principle caused several intermediate town centers to be bypassed.

Since the turnpike's original construction, the roadway has been realigned and substantially widened to become the Berlin Turnpike that it is today — a major commercial thoroughfare. Many parts of the original alignment are maintained as local roads or unsigned state roads.

== Junction list ==
County	Location	mi	km	Destinations	Notes
New Haven	Meriden	0.00	0.00	Route 15 south (Wilbur Cross Parkway) to I-91 south	Continuation south; southern end of Route 15 concurrency
New Haven	Meriden	0.00	0.00	US 5 south (North Broad Street) to I-691 / Route 66 – Meriden	Interchange; southbound exit and northbound entrance; southern end of US 5 concurrency
Hartford	Berlin	4.69– 5.05	7.55– 8.13	Route 9 / Route 372 – Middletown, New Britain, East Berlin	Interchange; exits 31 & 32 on Route 9
Hartford	Berlin			Worthington Ridge Road (SR 572 south)	
Hartford	Berlin	5.87	9.45	Route 160 east – Rocky Hill	Western terminus of Route 160
Hartford	Newington	7.37	11.86	Route 173 north – West Hartford	Southern terminus of Route 173
Hartford	Newington	7.99	12.86	Route 176 north – Newington	Southern terminus of Route 176
Hartford	Newington	9.38	15.10	Route 287 west – Newington	Southern end of Route 287 concurrency
Hartford	Newington	9.45	15.21	Route 287 east – Wethersfield	Northern end of Route 287 concurrency
Hartford	Newington–Wethersfield line	10.08	16.22	Route 175 – Newington, New Britain, Wethersfield	Interchange
Hartford	Wethersfield	11.10	17.86	US 5 north / Route 15 north (Wilbur Cross Highway) to I-91 – Hartford Route 314 begins	Interchange; northbound exit and southbound entrance; northern end of US 5/Route 15 concurrency
Hartford	Wethersfield	11.79	18.97	Route 314 east – Wethersfield; SR 543 begins	Northern end of Route 314 concurrency; southern terminus of SR 543
Hartford	Wethersfield–Hartford line	12.17	19.59	Maple Avenue; SR 543 ends	Continuation north; northern terminus of SR 543
1.000 mi = 1.609 km; 1.000 km = 0.621 mi: Concurrency terminus
