= Special routes of U.S. Route 5 =

Special routes of U.S. Route 5

Highway system
- United States Numbered Highway System; List; Special; Divided

At least 12 special routes of U.S. Route 5 (US 5) have existed.

== Connecticut ==
=== New Haven–North Haven alternate route 1 ===
U.S. Route 5 Alternate
- Location: New Haven–North Haven, Connecticut
- Existed: 1933–1941

=== New Haven–North Haven alternate route 2 ===
U.S. Route 5 Alternate
- Location: New Haven–North Haven, Connecticut
- Existed: 1941–1966

=== New Haven–Meriden alternate route ===
U.S. Route 5 Alternate
- Location: New Haven–Meriden, Connecticut

=== Lamentation State Park–Tracy alternate route 1 ===
U.S. Route 5 Alternate
- Location: Lamentation State Park–Tracy, Connecticut
- Existed: 1937–1941

=== Lamentation State Park–Tracy alternate route 2 ===
U.S. Route 5 Alternate
- Location: Lamentation State Park–Tracy, Connecticut
- Existed: 1940s–1950s

=== Berlin alternate route ===
U.S. Route 5 Alternate
- Location: Berlin, Connecticut

=== East Hartford–East Windsorhill alternate route ===
U.S. Route 5 Alternate
- Location: East Hartford–East Windsorhill, Connecticut

=== Hartford–West Springfield alternate route ===
U.S. Route 5 Alternate
- Location: Hartford, Connecticut–West Springfield, Massachusetts

== Massachusetts ==
=== South Deerfield bypass route ===
U.S. Route 5 Bypass
- Location: South Deerfield, Massachusetts

== Vermont ==
=== St. Johnsbury alternate route ===
U.S. Route 5 Alternate
- Location: St. Johnsbury, Vermont
- Length: 1.282 mi (2.063 km)

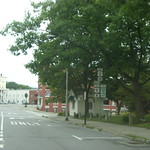
A view of the northern end of the concurrency between US 5 Alt. and US 2 west of downtown St. Johnsbury

U.S. Route 5 Alternate (US 5 Alt.) in St. Johnsbury, Vermont, runs parallel to US 5. US 5 goes through the downtown area, while US 5 Alt. goes around the west side of the city. The road has three names: Main Street, Mt. Pleasant Street, and Hastings Street. The route, known as Main Street at this point, starts from its southern terminus at its junction with US 5, just north of US 5's interchange with I-91 (exit 20). The road goes up a winding hill before meeting US 2. Between its junctions with US 5 and US 2, US 5 Alt. is concurrent with US 2 Truck. US 2 goes west on Western Avenue, while US 5 Alt. continues north, concurrent with US 2. At the next intersection, US 2 turns east onto Eastern Avenue and US 5 Alt. continues on Main Street as the road turns slightly right. At Arnold Park, Main Street keeps right, while US 5 Alt. turns left onto Mt. Pleasant Street. After that, Mt. Pleasant Street keeps straight while US 5 Alt. veers right onto Hastings Street. The road keeps straight until its northern terminus at US 5 north of St. Johnsbury.

Major intersections

The entire route is in St. Johnsbury, Caledonia County.

| mi | km | Destinations | Notes |
|---|---|---|---|
| 0.00 | 0.00 | US 5 / US 2 Truck east to I-91 / US 2 east – St. Johnsbury, Barnet | Southern terminus; southern end of US 2 Truck concurrency |
| 0.39 | 0.63 | US 2 west (Western Avenue) / US 2 Truck east to I-91 north – Danville | Southern end of concurrency with US 2; northern end of concurrency with US 2 Truck |
| 0.47 | 0.76 | US 2 east (Eastern Avenue) to VT 18 – St. Johnsbury | Northern end of concurrency with US 2 |
| 1.28 | 2.06 | US 5 to I-91 / US 2 east – St. Johnsbury, Lyndon | Northern terminus |
1.000 mi = 1.609 km; 1.000 km = 0.621 mi: Concurrency terminus

=== Newport alternate route ===
U.S. Route 5 Alternate
- Location: Newport, Vermont
- Length: 1.283 mi (2.065 km)

U.S. Route 5 Alternate (US 5 Alt.) in Newport, Vermont, runs parallel to US 5. US 5 goes through the downtown area, while US 5 Alt. goes around the southeast side of the city. The road that US 5 Alt. is on only carries the name of Coventry Street. This route starts from its southern terminus at its junction with US 5, near the edge of the city limits. The road goes northeast and meets with the South Bay on the east side. US 5 Alt. continues straight after intersecting with 2nd Street. Before the next intersection, US 5 turns northwest still as Coventry Street entering the Newport urban area. The road keeps straight until its northern terminus at US 5 in downtown Newport.

=== Derby Line alternate route ===
U.S. Route 5 Alternate
- Location: Derby Line, Vermont
- Length: 0.604 mi (972 m)

U.S. Route 5 Alternate (US 5 Alt.) in Derby Line, Vermont, is an alternate way to reach Canada from US 5. The road that US 5 Alt. is on only carries the name of Caswell Avenue. This route starts from its southern terminus at its junction with US 5 in downtown Derby Line. This road then travels east to Interstate 91 (I-91). At I-91, US 5 Alt. merges with the I-91 northbound continuing until its northern terminus at the Canada–United States border. The road continues north as Autoroute 55 in Quebec, Canada.

== See also ==
- List of special routes of the United States Numbered Highway System
