= Wallingford Center, Connecticut =

Census-designated place in Connecticut, United States

- Census-designated place
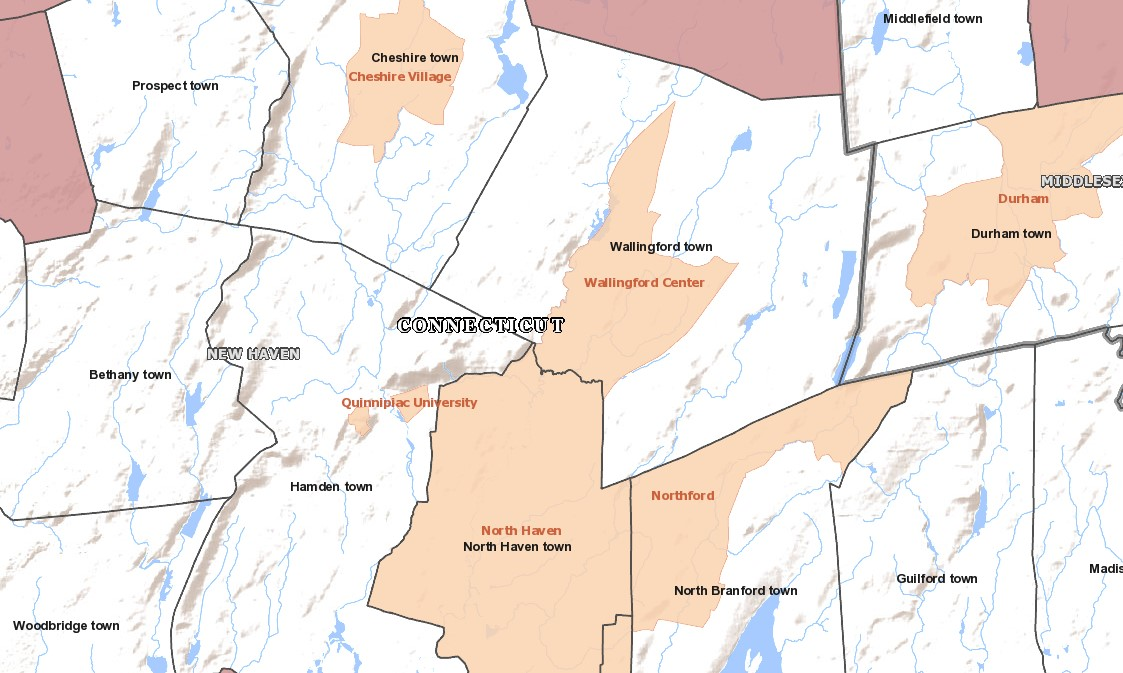

- Location within Connecticut Location within the United States
- Coordinates: 41°27′15″N 72°49′5″W
- Country: United States
- State: Connecticut
- County: New Haven
- Town: Wallingford

Area
  - Total: 7.38 sq mi (19.11 km^{2})
  - Land: 7.26 sq mi (18.80 km^{2})
  - Water: 0.12 sq mi (0.31 km^{2})
- Elevation: 148 ft (45 m)

Population (2010)
  - Total: 18,209
  - Density: 2,509/sq mi (968.6/km^{2})
- Time zone: UTC-5 (Eastern (EST))
  - Summer (DST): UTC-4 (EDT)
- ZIP Code: 06492 (Wallingford)
- Area codes: 203/475
- FIPS code: 09-78880
- GNIS feature ID: 2377875

Wallingford Center is a historic district in the heart of Wallingford comprising the primary community in the town of Wallingford, New Haven County, Connecticut, United States.

It features a walkable downtown area lined with boutique shops, local eateries, and historic estates spanning Colonials, Victorians, and Cape Cods.

Wallingford Center also benefits from transit connectivity, with the Wallingford Train Station serving the Hartford Line for commutes to New Haven, Hartford, along with access to New York City and Boston. Its location along I-91 and the Wilbur Cross Parkway provides residents with access to the broader Connecticut region, whether for work or recreation.

As of the 2020 census, Wallingford Center had a population of 18,278.

== Demographics ==
=== 2020 census ===
As of the 2020 census, Wallingford Center had a population of 18,278. The median age was 40.3 years. 19.3% of residents were under the age of 18 and 17.9% of residents were 65 years of age or older. For every 100 females there were 93.4 males, and for every 100 females age 18 and over there were 91.4 males age 18 and over.

100.0% of residents lived in urban areas, while 0.0% lived in rural areas.

There were 7,826 households in Wallingford Center, of which 25.0% had children under the age of 18 living in them. Of all households, 38.1% were married-couple households, 21.9% were households with a male householder and no spouse or partner present, and 31.4% were households with a female householder and no spouse or partner present. About 36.8% of all households were made up of individuals and 13.9% had someone living alone who was 65 years of age or older.

There were 8,312 housing units, of which 5.8% were vacant. The homeowner vacancy rate was 1.1% and the rental vacancy rate was 5.2%.

Racial composition as of the 2020 census
Race	Number	Percent
White	13,957	76.4%
Black or African American	528	2.9%
American Indian and Alaska Native	74	0.4%
Asian	708	3.9%
Native Hawaiian and Other Pacific Islander	11	0.1%
Some other race	1,372	7.5%
Two or more races	1,628	8.9%
Hispanic or Latino (of any race)	3,105	17.0%
