= List of U.S. Highways in Connecticut =

United States Numbered Highway System
- US Route markers

System information
- Length: 547.75 mi (881.52 km)
- Notes: U.S. Highways in Connecticut maintained by ConnDOT

Highway names
- Interstates: Interstate X (I-X)
- US Highways: U.S. Route X (US X)
- State: Route X

System links
- Connecticut State Highway System; Interstate; US; State; SSR; SR; Scenic

United States Numbered Highways in the U.S. state of Connecticut, are numbered by the American Association of State Highway and Transportation Officials (AASHTO) and maintained by the Connecticut Department of Transportation, a total of 547.75 miles (881.52 km) as a system of state highways and are numbered from 1 to 202.

== History ==
In 1926, the U.S. highway system was implemented. U.S. Routes 1, 5, 6, and 7, plus 202 were used as designations on several primary state highways, replacing New England routes 1, 2, 3, and 4, respectively. The other New England routes that were not re-designated as U.S. routes became ordinary state highways but kept their number designation, which are used even today (with some realignment).

== Primary routes ==
Number	Length (mi)	Length (km)	Southern or western terminus	Northern or eastern terminus	Formed	Removed	Notes
US 1	117.37	188.89	US 1 in Port Chester, NY	US 1 in Westerly, RI	1926	current	Mostly follows the old New England Route 1; functionally bypassed by I-95
US 5	54.59	87.85	I-91 in New Haven, CT	US 5 in Longmeadow, MA	1926	current	Mostly follows the old New England Route 2; functionally bypassed by I-91
US 6	116.33	187.21	US 6/US 202 in Southeast, NY	US 6 in Foster, RI	1926	current	Most of the proposed routing was part of old New England Route 3
US 7	78.29	126.00	I-95 in Norwalk	US 7 in Sheffield, MA	1926	current	Mostly follows the old New England Route 4
US 44	106.03	170.64	US 44 in North East, NY	US 44 in Glocester, RI	1934	current	
US 202	75.14	120.93	US 6/US 202 in Southeast, NY	US 202/Route 10 in Southwick, MA	1935	current	
Former

== Alternate and auxiliary routes ==
Number	Length (mi)	Length (km)	Southern or western terminus	Northern or eastern terminus	Formed	Removed	Notes
US 1A	1.93	3.11	US 1 in Stonington	US 1 in Stonington	1939	current	Only remaining US alternate route in the state
US 1A	—	—	Greenwich	Milford	—	—	Planning number for the Merritt Parkway. No route number signs were erected until it became part of Route 15 in 1948.
US 1A	—	—	Stamford	Stamford	—	—	
US 1A	—	—	Darien	Darien	1956	—	Old section of US 1 when the freeway was built there; now part of US 1 and the freeway is part of I-95
US 1A	—	—	Norwalk	Norwalk	c. 1950	—	Cross Street
US 1A	—	—	Bridgeport	Stratford	c. 1928	1963	Present-day US 1 (North St, Boston Rd, Barnum Ave) then Main St (part of today's Route 113) and E. Main St (part of today's Route 110)
US 1A	—	—	Milford	Milford	c. 1920	c. 1940	Boston Post Road, between Bridgeport Ave and Cherry St; now part of US 1
US 1A	—	—	East Haven	East Haven	c. 1941	c. 1947	Main Street when the Saltonstall Parkway part of US 1 opened; previously part of US 1.
US 1A	—	—	Branford, Connecticut	Branford, Connecticut	c. 1934	1963	West Main St, Main St, and East Main St
US 1A	—	—	Old Saybrook	Old Saybrook	c. 1938	c. 1952	Oyster River Rd (now the diagonal part of US 1). US 1 used to follow Old Boston Post Road into town.
US 1A	—	—	East Lyme	New London	1943	1977	Created when new US 1 freeway (now I-95) opened in 1943; deleted when US 1 was returned there in 1977.
US 1A	—	—	Groton	Groton	1936	1940	New section of Long Hill Road (today's US 1). The contemporary US 1 followed Thames Street, Poquonnock Road, Tower Avenue and Runway Lane.
US 1A	—	—	Groton	Groton	c. 1956	—	Section of Bridge Street leading eastward from today's I-95 exit 85 to US 1
US 5A	—	—	Berlin Turnpike in Wethersfield	MA 159 in Suffield	1932	1968	Now Route 159
US 5A	—	—	East Hartford	Windsor	1940	1945	Originally US 5 before the four-lane US 5 opened to the east.
US 5A	—	—	Berlin	Berlin	1940	1963	Worthington Ridge Road, formerly part of US 5.
US 5A	—	—	Meriden	Wallingford	1932	1963	A 7-mile section including Old Colony Road.
US 5A	—	—	New Haven	New Haven	1932	1940	State Street south from today's Route 22; now part of US 5
US 5A	—	—	New Haven	North Haven	c. 1950	1966	Middletown Avenue (today's Route 17) and Maple Avenue (today's Route 103); early US 5
US 6A	—	—	Newton	Southbury	1955	1965	US 6A was created when a new US 6/US 202 highway opened to the south (which is now part of I-84).
US 6A	—	—	Plymouth	Hartford	1932	1942	There have been several routes signed as US 6A in the state; no special routes currently exist.
US 6A	—	—	Woodbury	Willimantic	1941	1967	Also served Waterbury, Meriden and Middletown; in 1967, US 6A was broken into Routes 64, 322, and 66
US 6A	—	—	Coventry	Windham	1940	1942	When US 6 was moved to its current "Suicide 6" path, this route briefly was US 6A before becoming part of Route 31.
US 6A	—	—	Killingly	Killingly	1959	1968	Now the Danielson Pike (SR 607/SR 618), this northern loop out of Danielson was part of US 6
US 44A	22.43	36.10	US 44 in Manchester	US 44 in Ashford	1948	1982	When US 44 was relocated along a portion of the Wilbur Cross Highway, the former surface alignment became US 44A.
US 202A	1.23	1.98	US 202 in Danbury	US 202 in Danbury	1935	1974	Former number for Coal Pit Hill Road in Danbury
Former

== See also ==
- List of state routes in Connecticut
