= Connecticut Route 302 =

State highway in Fairfield County, Connecticut, US

Route 302
- Map of Fairfield County in southwestern Connecticut with Route 302 highlighted in red

Route information
- Maintained by CTDOT
- Length: 7.96 mi (12.81 km)
- Existed: 1974–present

Major junctions
- West end: Route 53 in Bethel
- East end: Route 25 in Newtown

Location
- Country: United States
- State: Connecticut
- Counties: Fairfield

Highway system
- Connecticut State Highway System; Interstate; US; State; SSR; SR; Scenic
← I-291	→ Route 305

Route 302 is a state highway in western Connecticut running from Bethel to Newtown.

== Route description ==
Route 302 begins at an intersection with Route 53 in Bethel center and heads generally east across the town to Newtown, intersecting the northern end of Route 58 during its path. In Newtown, it heads southeast and northeast to end at an intersection with Route 25 in the borough of Newtown.

The section of Route 302 in Newtown is designated the Second Company Governor’s Horse Guard Memorial Highway.

== History ==
In the 1920s, the road connecting Bethel center and Newtown borough was designated as State Highway 161 between Bethel and the Newtown Turnpike (modern Key Rock Road), and as part of State Highway 158 (the designation for the Newtown Turnpike) the rest of the way to Newtown borough. In the 1932 state highway renumbering, Route 34, a continuous New Haven to Danbury route, was established. The original Route 34 continued west beyond the current western end of modern Route 34 by overlapping with US 6 into Newtown borough, then using modern Route 302 to Bethel and modern Route 53 to downtown Danbury.

In 1935, a new U.S. Route, US 202, was established in Connecticut. The new US 202 went between Danbury and Newtown via Bethel along part of modern Route 53 and the entire length of modern Route 302. Route 34 was cut back to end in the village of Sandy Hook as it does today. On May 1, 1974, US 202 was relocated to a completely new alignment in northwestern Connecticut. The Bethel to Newtown segment of old US 202 was redesignated as Route 302. The Danbury to Bethel segment was assigned as a northward extension of Route 53.

== Junction list ==
The entire route is in Fairfield County.

Location	mi	km	Destinations	Notes
Community of Bethel	0.00	0.00	Route 53 (Grassy Plain Street)	Western terminus
Town of Bethel	1.72	2.77	Route 58 south – Redding Ridge	Northern terminus of Route 58
Borough of Newtown	7.96	12.81	Route 25 (Main Street)	Eastern terminus
1.000 mi = 1.609 km; 1.000 km = 0.621 mi
