= Bethel (CDP), Connecticut =

Bethel, Connecticut
- Census-designated place
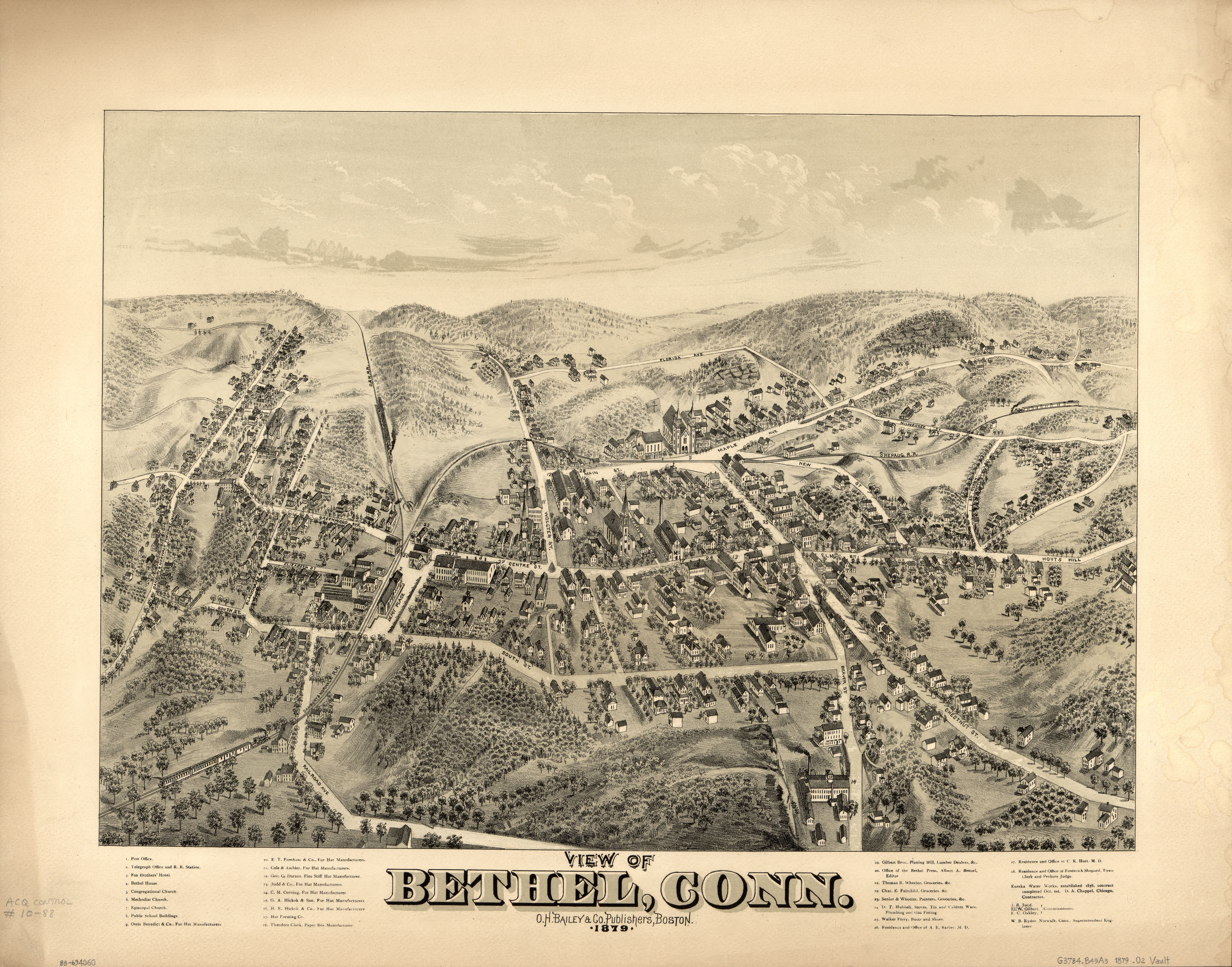
- 1879 sketch of Bethel
- Interactive map of Bethel, Connecticut
- Coordinates: 41°22′15″N 73°24′50″W
- State: Connecticut
- County: Fairfield
- Town: Bethel

Area
  - Total: 4.09 sq mi (10.59 km^{2})
  - Land: 4.09 sq mi (10.59 km^{2})
  - Water: 0 sq mi (0.0 km^{2})
- Elevation: 384 ft (117 m)

Population (2020)
  - Total: 11,582
  - Density: 2,335/sq mi (901.4/km^{2})
- ZIP Code: 06801
- FIPS code: 09-04790
- GNIS feature ID: 2378335

Bethel is a census-designated place (CDP) in Fairfield County, Connecticut, United States. It comprises the primary village and surrounding residential land within the town of Bethel. As of the 2020 census, the population of the CDP was 11,582, out of 18,584 in the entire town.

== Geography ==
The Bethel CDP is in the western part of the town of Bethel, and is bordered to the west by the city of Danbury. The CDP extends north to East Swamp Brook and east to Wolf Pit Brook. The southern border of the CDP follows (from east to west) parts of Putnam Park Road, Hoyts Hill, Governors Lane, Whippoorwill Road, Winthrop Road, Spring Hill Lane, Whippoorwill Road again, Chestnut Ridge Road, Nashville Road Exd, Nashville Road, Turkey Plain Road, Grassy Plain Street, 2nd Lane, Francis J Clarke Circle and an unnamed brook back to the Danbury border.

Connecticut Route 53 passes through the west side of the community, leading north into downtown Danbury and south 13 miles (21 km) to Weston. Connecticut Route 302 runs east–west through the center of town, following Greenwood Avenue and part of Milwaukee Avenue. It continues east 6 miles (10 km) to Newtown. Connecticut Route 58 has its northern terminus at Route 302 in the eastern part of the CDP, and leads southeast 18 miles (29 km) to Fairfield at the Bridgeport border.

According to the U.S. Census Bureau, the Bethel CDP has an area of 4.1 square miles (10.6 km^{2}), all land. Brooks in the community flow northward to the Still River in Danbury, itself a northward-flowing tributary of the Housatonic River.

== Demographics ==
As of the census of 2010, there were 9,549 people, 3,903 households, and 2,451 families residing in the CDP. The population density was 2,335 inhabitants per square mile (902/km^{2}). There were 4,168 housing units, of which 265, or 6.4%, were vacant. The racial makeup of the CDP was 84.8% White, 2.6% African American, 0.1% Native American or Alaska Native, 5.8% Asian, 4.4% some other race, and 2.3% from two or more races. Hispanic or Latino of any race were 10.4% of the population.

Of the 3,903 households in the community, 32.9% had children under the age of 18 living with them, 46.4% were headed by married couples living together, 11.9% had a female householder with no husband present, and 37.2% were non-families. 31.1% of all households were made up of individuals, and 11.2% were someone living alone who was 65 years of age or older. The average household size was 2.44, and the average family size was 3.09.

22.4% of the CDP population were under the age of 18, 7.8% were from 18 to 24, 28.9% were from 25 to 44, 29.5% were from 45 to 64, and 11.7% were 65 years of age or older. The median age was 39.5 years. For every 100 females, there were 90.9 males. For every 100 females age 18 and over, there were 87.6 males.

For the period 2013–17, the estimated median annual income for a household in the CDP was $76,636, and the median income for a family was $100,938. Per capita income was $41,813. Male full-time workers had a median income of $52,050 versus $31,458 for females. About 1.9% of families and 2.9% of the population were living below the poverty line, including 2.3% of those under age 18 and 4.6% of those age 65 and over.
