= Newtown Borough Historic District =

Historic district in Connecticut

- U.S. National Register of Historic Places
- U.S. Historic district
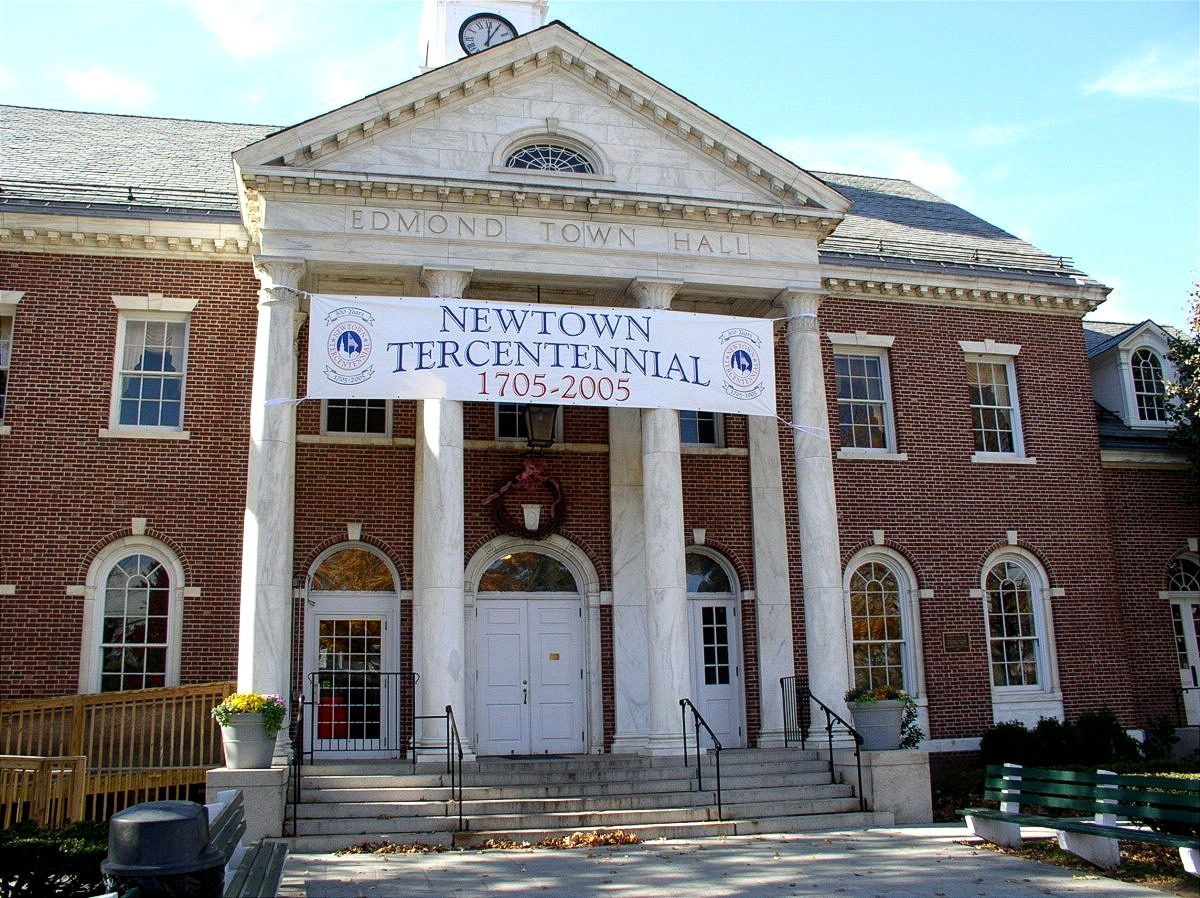
- Edmond Town Hall

- Location within Connecticut Location within the United States
- Location: Roughly, Main Street from Hawley Road to Academy Lane, Newtown, Connecticut
- Coordinates: 41°24′43″N 73°18′32″W
- Area: 100 acres (40 ha)
- Built: 1780
- Architect: multiple
- Architectural style: Colonial, Italianate, Colonial Revival
- NRHP reference No.: 96001458
- Added to NRHP: December 20, 1996

The Newtown Borough Historic District is a 100-acre (40 ha) historic district in the borough of Newtown in Newtown, Connecticut. There is a local historic district and an overlapping district that was listed on the National Register of Historic Places in 1996.

The National Register district includes just a small part of the current borough, but about half of the original borough as it was first incorporated in 1824. The local historic district was smaller, but the Ram's Pasture and another property were added in 2009. The district has a governance structure.

The district area has buildings dating from 1780 and includes the separately NRHP-listed Glover House and Caleb Baldwin Tavern.

In 1996, the district included 225 contributing buildings, tow other contributing structures, one contributing site, and two contributing objects. The one contributing site in the district is the "Ram's Pasture", a meadow that was common land.

Significant properties in the district include:

- Glover House
- Caleb Baldwin Tavern: The Baldwin Tavern is along the march route taken by French Army troops under General Rochambeau in 1781 on their march to Yorktown, Virginia.
- 17 Main Street, home of Arthur J. Smith, publisher of the Newtown Bee newspaper which began in 1877.
- Liberty Pole/Flagpole
- Soldiers and Sailors Monument
- Edmond Town Hall
- Matthew Curtiss House, 44 Main Street, a museum of the Newtown Historical Society
- Gen. Daniel Baldwin House, 38 Main Street, a formal Georgian style building that contrasts to most of the other architecture (see photo #4)
- Cyrenius H. Booth Library

== See also ==
- March Route of Rochambeau's army
- List of historic sites preserved along Rochambeau's route
- National Register of Historic Places listings in Fairfield County, Connecticut
