= Connecticut Route 136 =

State highway in Fairfield County, Connecticut, US

Route 136
- Map of Fairfield County in southwestern Connecticut with Route 136 highlighted in red

Route information
- Maintained by CTDOT
- Length: 20.46 mi (32.93 km)
- Existed: 1932–present

Major junctions
- West end: US 1 in Darien
- I-95 / Route 33 in Westport; Route 15 / Merritt Parkway / Route 57 in Westport
- East end: Route 59 in Easton

Location
- Country: United States
- State: Connecticut
- Counties: Fairfield

Highway system
- Connecticut State Highway System; Interstate; US; State; SSR; SR; Scenic
← Route 135	→ Route 137

Route 136 is a state highway in Southwestern Connecticut, running from Darien to Easton. The route was initially established in 1932 to serve the beach communities between Darien and Southport. Its eastern end was relocated in 1963 to head northeast from Westport to Easton instead.

== Route description ==
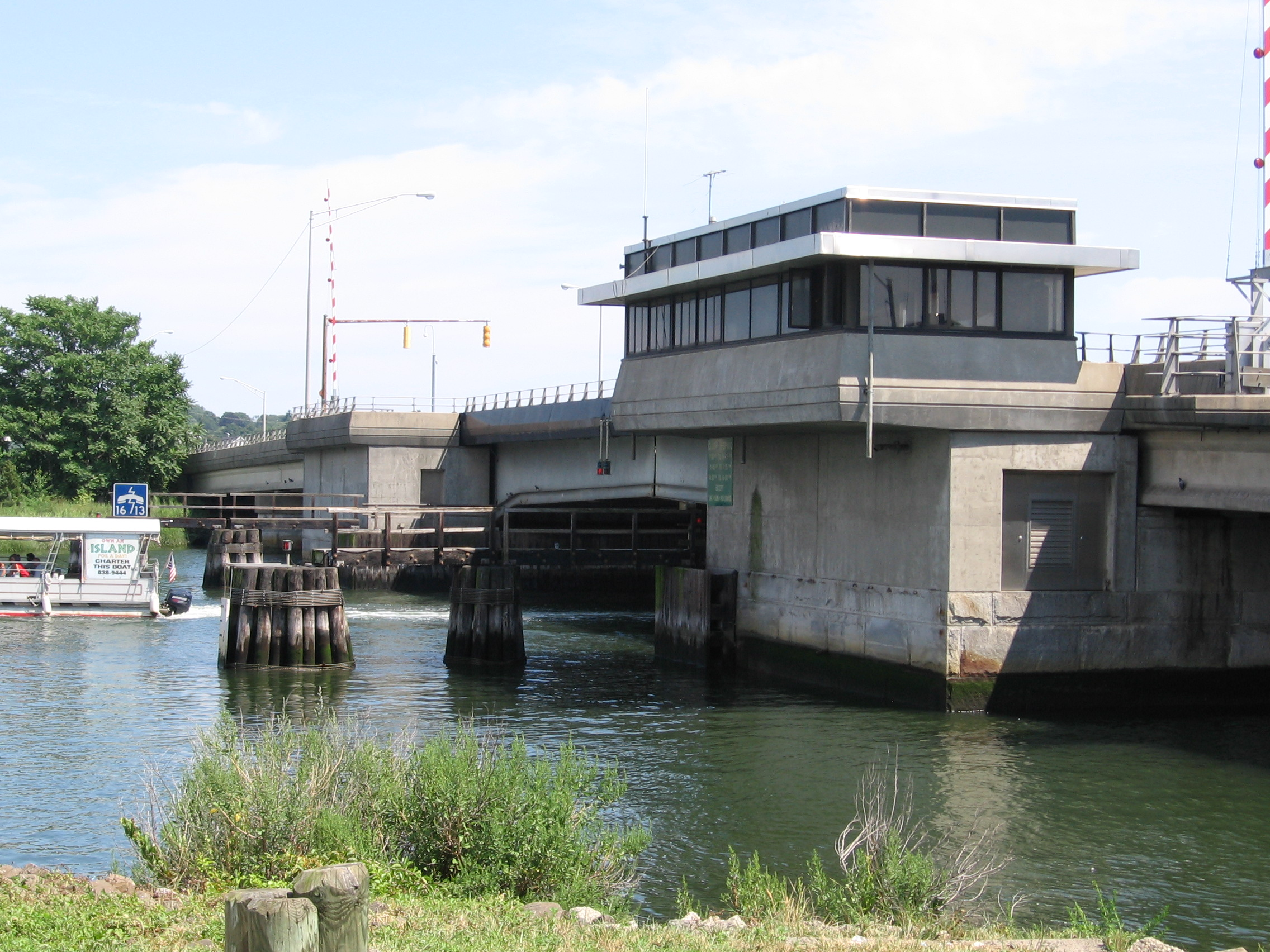
The Stanley Stroffolino Memorial Bridge is a bascule bridge that takes Route 136 over the Norwalk River. This view is facing southeast taken from a lot adjacent to Water Street in South Norwalk.

Route 136 begins at an intersection with US 1 in Darien and heads east, intersecting I-95 before crossing into Norwalk. In Norwalk, it continues south, east, and northeast through the Rowayton section of the city before a 1.11 miles (2 km) section maintained by the city between the intersection of Wilson and Meadow Streets and the intersection of Water and Washington Street, after which it continues east across the Norwalk River, through a triangular one-way couplet and into Westport. In Westport, Route 136 turns northeast along the Saugatuck River, intersecting I-95 again before crossing the Saugatuck (via the Saugatuck River Bridge), briefly overlapping with Route 57, passing underneath Route 15 (Merritt Parkway) does not have an interchange with it, and continuing northeast across the northwest corner of Fairfield into Easton. In Easton, it continues northeast before ending at an intersection with Route 59.

== History ==
Modern Route 136 in Westport and Easton was the southern portion of an early 19th-century public turnpike known as the Branch Turnpike, which was incorporated in 1831. The road ran from Wesport center, through Easton center and the Upper Stepney section of Monroe, to the Housatonic River at Bennett's Bridge in Newtown, and collected tolls until 1851. Between Easton center and Upper Stepney, the old turnpike is now part of Route 59.

In the early 1920s, Connecticut assigned numbers to its state roads. A coastal road in the Gold Coast region of the state running parallel to U.S. Route 1, from Darien to Southport, was designated as State Highway 335. The former Branch Turnpike, however, remained unnumbered. Route 136 was formed as part of the 1932 state highway renumbering as a renumbering of old Highway 335. In 1963, Route 136 was relocated to its current route, including the portion along the old Branch Turnpike, as a result of the 1961 Route Reclassification Act. Maintenance of the coastal portion of old Route 136 in Westport and Fairfield was returned to the towns. Additionally, a 1.1-mile (1.8 km) section in the South Norwalk section of Norwalk is still maintained by the city and is one of only two such maintenance gaps in a state highway in Connecticut (the other gap is at Route 83).

== Major intersections ==
The entire route is in Fairfield County.

Location	mi	km	Destinations	Notes
Darien	0.00	0.00	US 1 (Post Road)	Western terminus; serves Darien station
Darien	0.29	0.47	I-95 south – New York City	Exit 12 on I-95 north
Westport	8.28	13.33	I-95 / Route 33 north – New Haven, New York City, Westport	Exit 17 on I-95; southern terminus of Route 33
Westport	10.49	16.88	US 1 – Fairfield, Norwalk, Sherwood Island	Former Boston Post Road
Westport	11.78	18.96	Route 57 south (Main Street)	Western end of Route 57 concurrency
Westport	12.05	19.39	Route 15 / Merritt Parkway / Route 57 north	Eastern end of Route 57 concurrency; exit 21 on Merritt Parkway
Easton	17.25	27.76	Route 58 – Bridgeport, Redding Ridge	
Easton	20.46	32.93	Route 59 (Sport Hill Road)	Eastern terminus
1.000 mi = 1.609 km; 1.000 km = 0.621 mi: Concurrency terminus
