= Connecticut Route 58 =

State highway in Fairfield County, Connecticut, US

Route 58
- Map of Fairfield County in southwestern Connecticut with Route 58 highlighted in red

Route information
- Maintained by CTDOT
- Length: 18.58 mi (29.90 km)
- Existed: 1932–present

Major junctions
- South end: US 1 in Fairfield
- Route 15 / Merritt Parkway in Fairfield
- North end: Route 302 in Bethel

Location
- Country: United States
- State: Connecticut
- Counties: Fairfield

Highway system
- Connecticut State Highway System; Interstate; US; State; SSR; SR; Scenic
← Route 57	→ Route 59

Route 58 is a primary state highway in the U.S. state of Connecticut connecting the towns of Fairfield and Bethel. Route 58 is 18.58 miles (29.90 km) long and is one of the primary routes to the Downtown Danbury area via Route 302 and Route 53.

== Route description ==
Route 58 officially begins at U.S. Route 1 (US 1) in Fairfield, traveling for about one point zero mile (1.6 km) on Tunxis Hill Road up to the Black Rock Turnpike. Route 58 continues northward along the Black Rock Turnpike, passing through the towns of Easton and Redding. There is an interchange with Route 15 (Merritt Parkway) in Fairfield. Within Easton, Route 58 is also called Black Rock Road as well as the Black Rock Turnpike. Route 58 passes by two reservoirs (Hemlock Reservoir and Aspetuck Reservoir) that supply the Greater Bridgeport area with much of its drinking water. On crossing into the town of Bethel, Route 58 runs along "Putnam Park Road", ending at Route 302.

Black Rock Turnpike continues south after Route 58 separates from it in Fairfield. It ends at a junction between US 1 and Interstate 95 (I-95) in Fairfield. This portion is designated as State Road 732 and is 1.05 miles (1.69 km) long.

A 3.1-mile (5.0 km) section in Easton near the Hemlock Reservoir is a designated scenic highway.

== History ==
On April 25, 1777, during the Revolutionary War, British soldiers under the command of General William Tryon marched up the Redding Road, which paralleled present-day Route 58 south of Easton center and ran along Route 58 north of Easton center, on their way to Danbury to destroy homes, warehouses and ammunition stores as part of the Danbury Raid.

In May 1797, the northern portion of Redding Road was chartered as the Fairfield, Weston, and Redding Turnpike. The turnpike company improved the road from Easton village through Redding Ridge into Bethel (then a part of Danbury). It ran from Easton center along modern Route 58 then along Sunset Hill Road and Hoyts Hill Road. In May 1832, the road from Black Rock harbor to Easton village was chartered as a public toll road known as the Black Rock and Weston Turnpike or more commonly as just the Black Rock Turnpike. The old road ran north up to the Branch Turnpike (Route 136) and used the Branch Turnpike to reach Easton. Both turnpike roads are collectively known as Black Rock Turnpike today.

In the 1922, the Bridgeport to Danbury road became a state road and was known as State Highway 124. Highway 124 uses a newer alignment through Putnam Memorial State Park instead of the 19th century turnpike alignment (Sunset Hill Road). It also continued into Downtown Danbury using modern Route 302 and Route 53. Modern Route 58 was created in the 1932 state highway renumbering from old Highway 124. The route was truncated in 1935 to end in Bethel (at modern Route 302) instead of Danbury, when US 202 was designated, which was designated on the Danbury-Bethel segment.

The state developed plans in the 1960s to extend Route 58 northward as a freeway from its present terminus to I-84 in Danbury to divert through traffic around Danbury's congested central business district. Although the Route 58 Connector was cancelled, a short segment (known as Patriot Drive today) near the Danbury Train Station between White Street and Liberty Street was built.

== Junction list ==
The entire route is in Fairfield County.

Location	mi	km	Destinations	Notes
Fairfield	0.00	0.00	US 1 (Kings Highway)	Southern terminus; former Boston Post Road
Fairfield	1.04	1.67	Black Rock Turnpike (SR 732 south)	
Fairfield	1.55	2.49	Route 135 south – Fairfield University	Northern terminus of Route 135
Fairfield	3.41	5.49	Route 15 / Merritt Parkway – New Haven, New York City	Exit 27 on Merritt Parkway
Easton	6.90	11.10	Route 136 (Westport Road)	
Redding	15.77	25.38	Route 107 south – Redding Center	Northern terminus of Route 107
Bethel	18.58	29.90	Route 302 – Bethel, Danbury, Newtown	Northern terminus
1.000 mi = 1.609 km; 1.000 km = 0.621 mi
