= Connecticut Route 59 =

State highway in Fairfield County, Connecticut, US

Route 59
- Map of Fairfield County in southwestern Connecticut with Route 59 highlighted in red

Route information
- Maintained by CTDOT
- Length: 12.05 mi (19.39 km)
- Existed: 1932–present

Major junctions
- South end: US 1 in Bridgeport
- Route 15 / Merritt Parkway in Fairfield
- North end: Route 25 in Monroe

Location
- Country: United States
- State: Connecticut
- Counties: Fairfield

Highway system
- Connecticut State Highway System; Interstate; US; State; SSR; SR; Scenic
← Route 58	→ Route 61

Route 59 is a north–south state highway in Connecticut, running from Bridgeport to Monroe. Between Bridgeport and Easton, Route 59 used to be the Stratfield and Weston Turnpike, which operated from 1797 to 1886. Modern Route 59 was designated along the turnpike route in 1932 with a northward extension to the Upper Stepney section of Monroe.

== Route description ==
The route begins at North Avenue (U.S. Route 1, US 1) in the Stratfield Neighborhood of Bridgeport along Brooklawn Avenue. It runs in a northwest direction, briefly running along the Bridgeport–Fairfield town line for about 0.3 miles (0.48 km) before entering Fairfield proper. In Fairfield, the road is known as Stratfield Road and Easton Turnpike. Just south of the Fairfield–Easton town line, Route 59 crosses over Route 15 (Merritt Parkway) with an interchange in Fairfield. After crossing the Mill River Bridge, Route 59 enters the town of Easton and the road name changes to Sport Hill Road. The road continues northwest towards Easton Center then turns northeast along Stepney Road at the junction with Route 136. Route 59 ends at Main Street (Route 25) in the Upper Stepney section of Monroe near the Monroe Shopping Center.

== History ==
By the late 18th century, the main road from the village of Stratfield (then in the town of Fairfield) to the village of Easton (then in the town of Weston) had become almost impassable and the repairs were deemed too costly for the towns to shoulder. In 1797, the Stratfield and Weston Turnpike company was chartered with the task of improving the said road and given the privilege of collecting tolls from travelers using the road. The toll road or turnpike, which was alternatively known as the Easton Turnpike, was in operation until 1886, when Fairfield County made all its turnpikes free.

By the beginning of the 20th century, the state took over maintenance of most of the major through routes. In 1922, Connecticut began marking its state highways with numbers. By this time, the village of Stratfield had been absorbed into the city of Bridgeport while Easton had become a separate town (since 1845). The Stratfield-Easton route was designated as State Highway 306. In 1932, the state overhauled its highway numbering system. Most of old Highway 306 was renumbered as part of Route 59. Instead of turning west on Center Street in Easton center, Route 59 continued northwest to meet Westport Road (now Route 136). Westport Road and its continuation, Stepney Road, were both part of another old turnpike, the Branch Turnpike. Route 59 continued northeast along Stepney Road, ending at Route 25 in Upper Stepney. Route 136 was later relocated along the Westport Road section of the Branch Turnpike (in 1963).

=== Mill River bridge ===
The route's bridge over the Mill River in Easton, which carries more than 10,000 cars and trucks every day, has a substructure rated in critical condition by state safety inspectors. As of early August 2007, the bridge was one of 12 in the southwestern part of the state (including New Haven) with safety inspection ratings so low they are considered to be in critical condition. The ratings for these bridges were worse than the I-35W Mississippi River bridge in Minneapolis, which collapsed during rush hour on August 1, 2007.

== Major intersections ==
The entire route is in Fairfield County.

Location	mi	km	Destinations	Notes
Bridgeport	0.00	0.00	US 1 (North Avenue)	Southern terminus; former Boston Post Road
Fairfield	3.70	5.95	Route 15 / Merritt Parkway – New Haven, New York City	Exit 28 on Merritt Parkway; access via SR 713/SR 726
Easton	7.87	12.67	Route 136 south (Westport Road)	Northern terminus of Route 136
Monroe	12.05	19.39	Route 25 – Newtown, Danbury	Northern terminus
1.000 mi = 1.609 km; 1.000 km = 0.621 mi
