= Burkenroad Reports =

- Editor: Lesley Baker (US reports)
- Categories: Finance; Investment Research
- Frequency: Semi-annual
- Circulation: national
- Publisher: Freeman School of Business at Tulane University
- First issue: 1993
- Country: United States
- Language: English (US reports); Spanish & English (Latin American reports)
- Website: www.freeman.tulane.edu/burkenroad/

Burkenroad Reports are widely circulated financial reports on small- to medium-sized companies around the Gulf Coast that are traditionally under-followed by bulge bracket stock analysts. Colloquially the Burkenroad-followed companies are referred to as "stocks under rocks". The reports are published by the Freeman School of Business at Tulane University. Under faculty supervision, students work in small groups to produce the reports after visiting companies and interviewing top management. This procedure gives students the opportunity to develop practical stock analysis skills.

== History ==
Burkenroad reports was founded by Peter Ricchiuti in 1993. Since its founding, the reports have gained national attention for their "quality and for avoiding the conflicts inherent when analysts follow a company in which they have financial stake" (The Wall Street Journal, October 1995). Over 40 company reports have been published since the project's inception. Twenty-one companies under Burkenroad coverage have been taken over since 1993. The Latin American expansion of the program began in 2001. Later in 2001, The Burkenroad Mutual Fund went live. There are hundreds of Burkenroad Reports Tulane alumni in the investment industry. These alumni are colloquially jokingly referred to as "Burkendorks," in reference to their attention to detail and dedication to accurate reporting.

== Annual conference ==
Burkenroad Reports has hosted public investment conferences in New Orleans. The Burkenroad annual conference gives an opportunity for individual and institutional investors to hear directly from top management of Burkenroad-covered companies. The event also provides a forum for students, alumni, and business managers to network with one another.

== Mutual fund ==
The Hancock Horizon Burkenroad Mutual Fund (HHBUX, HYBUX and HIBUX), is managed by Horizon Advisors and is distributed by SEI Investments. The Burkenroad fund seeks capital appreciation by investing primarily in common stocks of companies with small capitalizations located or doing business in Alabama, Florida, Georgia, Louisiana, Mississippi, and Texas. The fund managers utilize a quantitative top down approach to picking stocks and use Tulane's Burkenroad Reports as a source of research and analysis when needed. Since inception (12/31/01) the fund has outperformed about 94% of domestic equity mutual funds and has significantly outpaced both the Russell 2000 and S&P 500 indexes, although appropriate risk adjustments need to be made.

== Latin America expansion ==
The Latin American expansion of the Burkenroad Reports started in 2001 when the Inter-American Development Bank issued a grant for the project. Tulane University works in conjunction with universities in Mexico, Venezuela, Colombia, Peru and Ecuador to provide reports of companies in Latin America. Universities in Guatemala and Ecuador also have plans to participate. The Latin American Burkenroad Reports are provided for free in Spanish and English (click here to access).

=== Objective ===
Burkenroad Latin America's objective is to promote the development of small and medium-sized enterprises in the region by improving its capacity to access financial markets (capital) and increasing the local supply of skilled management.

== Media coverage ==
Below is a list of several, but not all, of the media reports on the Burkenroad Reports.

=== Videos ===
- Peter Ricchiuti & NBR Co-Anchor Paul Kangas, A Lesson in Investing From Burkenroad Reports, Nightly Business Report, 21 April 2004.
- Kudlow & Company, Burkenroad Reports, CNBC, 22 April 2005.
- Peter Ricchiuti, Burkenroad Reports, Nightly Business Report, March 2006.
- CNN Interviews Peter Ricchiuti, CNN, April 2006.

=== Articles ===
- Emily Nelson, Some Managers Turn to Tulane in Search for Stock Tips, The Wall Street Journal, 10 October 1995.
- Katherine S. Mangan, Tulane Program Gives Business Students Direct Experience in Analyzing Companies, Chronicle of Higher Education, 12 December 1997.
- Sana Siwolop, Students Analyze Stocks, and the Professionals Learn to Listen, The New York Times, 7 March 1999.
- Paul Katzeff, Hancock Burkenroad Is A Classy Fund, Investor's Business Daily, Inc., 31 July 2002.
- Amy Esbenshade Hebert, Stocks Under Rocks: College students supply many of the offbeat picks for a unique fund, Kiplinger's Personal Finance, Sept. 2005.

== List of representative companies ==
Below is a sampling from the 40 companies the reports have covered since the program's inception.

- AFCE - AFC Enterprises - Atlanta, GA - Food Retailing
- AMSF - AMERISAFE, Inc. - DeRidder, LA - Insurance; former CEO Allen Bradley
- CRR - Carbo Ceramics Inc. - Irving, TX - Oilfield Services
- CNL - CLECO Corporation - Pineville, LA - Energy, Utility
- CONN - Conn's Inc. - Beaumont, TX - Retail, Electronics
- CRFT - Craftmade International - Coppell, TX - Consumer Products
- CRWS - Crown Crafts Inc. - Gonzales, LA - Apparel
- EGP - EastGroup Properties - Jackson, MS - Real Estate
- EPL - Energy Partners - New Orleans, LA - Oil & Gas Exploration
- ENSI - EnergySouth Inc. - Mobile, AL - Energy, Natural Gas
- FMFC - First M&F Corporation - Kosciusko, MS - Regional Banks
- FFEX - Frozen Food Express Indus. - Dallas, TX - Transportation
- FRZ - Reddy Ice, Dallas, TX - Packaged Ice Manufacturing
- HIBB - Hibbett Sporting Goods Inc. - Birmingham, AL - Retail, Sporting Goods
- HOS - Hornbeck Offshore Services - Covington, LA - Oilfield Services
- MPX - Marine Products Corp. - Atlanta, GA - Leisure Goods, Boats
- MMR - McMoRan Exploration - New Orleans, LA - Energy, E&P
- PKY - Parkway Properties - Jackson, MS - Real Estate
- POOL - Pool Corporation - Covington, LA - Leisure Goods, Pools
- ROL - Rollins Inc. - Atlanta, GA - Consumer Services
- RES - RPC Inc. - Atlanta, GA - Oilfield Services
- SBH - Sally Beauty Holdings - Denton, TX - Retail
- SAFM - Sanderson Farms Inc. - Laurel, MS - Chicken Processing
- CKH - SEACOR Holdings Inc. - Ft. Lauderdale, FL - Oilfield Services
- SGR - Shaw Group Inc. - Baton Rouge, LA - Engineering, Fabrication
- TISI - Team Inc. - Alvin, TX - Industrial Services
- WTI - W&T Offshore Inc. - Houston, TX - Oilfield Services
- WG - Willbros Group - Houston, TX - Oilfield Services

== See also ==
- Freeman School of Business
- Tulane University
