= Camps Nos. 10 and 41 of Rochambeau's Army =

- Camps No. 10 and 41 of Rochambeau's Army
- U.S. National Register of Historic Places
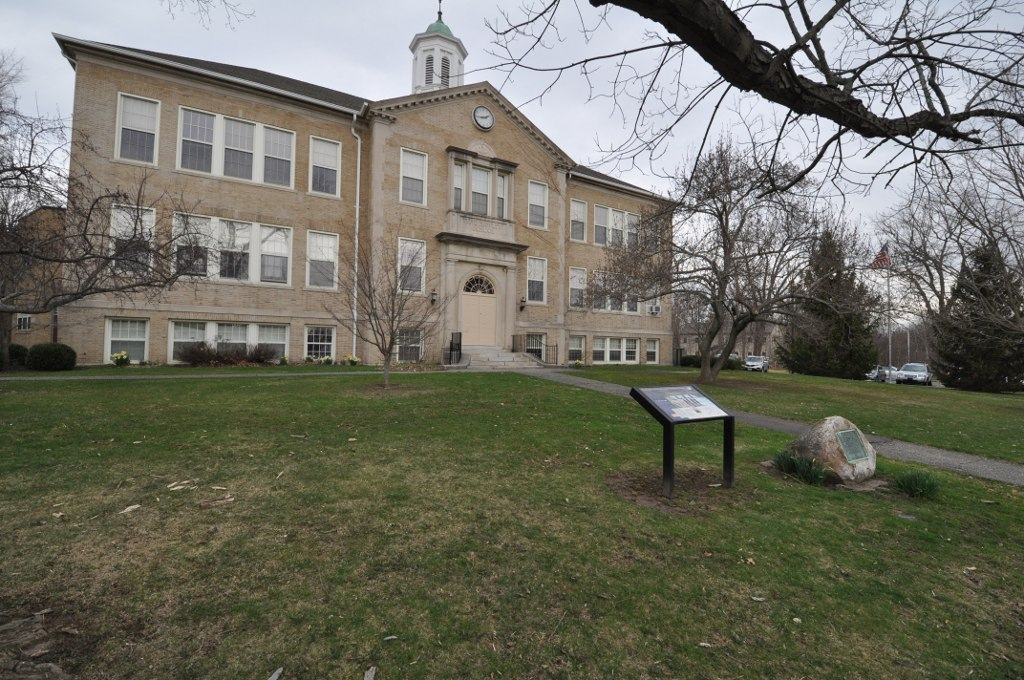
- Historic marker about the Rochambeau camps, at Hawley School

- Location within Connecticut Location within the United States
- Location: East and West of the Town Center of Newtown, Connecticut
- Coordinates: 41°24′53″N 73°18′08″W
- Area: 5 acres (2.0 ha)
- Built: 1781
- MPS: Rochambeau's Army in Connecticut, 1780-1782 MPS
- NRHP reference No.: 02000424
- Added to NRHP: May 6, 2002

Camps No. 10 and 41 of Rochambeau's Army, also known as Site No. 97-87D, is a historical archeological site that was listed on the National Register of Historic Places in 2002. It encompasses the areas occupied by the French Army under General Rochambeau during their marches across Connecticut in 1781 and 1783. One of the major encampment sites is located on the grounds of the Hawley School, where a historic marker is placed.

== History ==
American and French military leaders decided to join their forces outside British-held New York City in 1781, during the American Revolutionary War. This required Rochambeau's French army to march west across Connecticut, which it did in summer of 1781. The army's 10th camp was in Newtown, then a small community in western Connecticut. This encampment was one of the largest in Connecticut, since all four French regiments were encamped here simultaneously prior to beginning their southwesterly march toward New York. Two of the regiments were encamped on a low rise a short way east of the village center, including the area where the Hawley School now stands. French maps of the period also show a second large encampment area farther east near Sandy Hook, and a smaller camp for advance forces on a rise west of the village. Officers were quartered at the Caleb Baldwin Tavern.

On the march toward Newtown, the army's regiments all marched independently on the same route, separated by a day's travel. From Newtown south, the army marched as a single unit due to their approach to enemy-held territory. The army then marched to Virginia and the Siege of Yorktown. It returned to Providence in 1783, retracing much of the route that it had followed in 1781. The Newtown sites were among those reused during the return march.

== See also ==
- March Route of Rochambeau's army
- List of historic sites preserved along Rochambeau's route
