= Paul Spindt =

American academic

- Citizenship: USA
- Known for: Finance research
- Awards: Journal of Finance award
- Scientific career
- Fields: Finance
- Institutions: Freeman School of Business

Paul Spindt is the Keehn Berry Chair of Banking and Finance at the Freeman School of Business at Tulane University. He was previously a section chief of the Federal Reserve System and taught at the University of North Carolina at Chapel Hill and Arizona State University before coming to Tulane. In addition to teaching and researching, he also works as a consultant. He has published a multitude of influential finance articles, and has contributed to the economic understanding of the analysis of monetary transactions. Additionally, he regularly publishes research on IPO analysis and dividend vs. stock repurchase decisions. He is an award recipient of the Journal of Finance.

== Personal life ==
Spindt's hobbies include photography, golf, and scuba diving. He enjoys listening to Elvis. Spindt is known to maintain a diverse home page, P.A. Spindt Unplugged (see here), which includes photos of tortoises.

== Publications ==
Some of Spindt's more notable contributions include:

- "T vs Q: The Measurement and Analysis of Monetary transactions," (with C. Corrado), Journal of Economics and Business, 45 (1993): 193–212.
- "Wanna Dance? How Firms and Underwriters Choose Each Other,"(with V. Gatchev and C. Fernando), Journal of Finance, 60 (2005): 2437–69.
- "Are share prices informative? Evidence from ownership, pricing, turnover, and performance of IPOs",(with S. Krishnamurthy and C. Fernando), Journal of Financial Markets, 7 (2004): 377–403.

== See also ==
- Freeman School of Business
