= C.W. Lemoine =

Author, fighter pilot aviation analyst

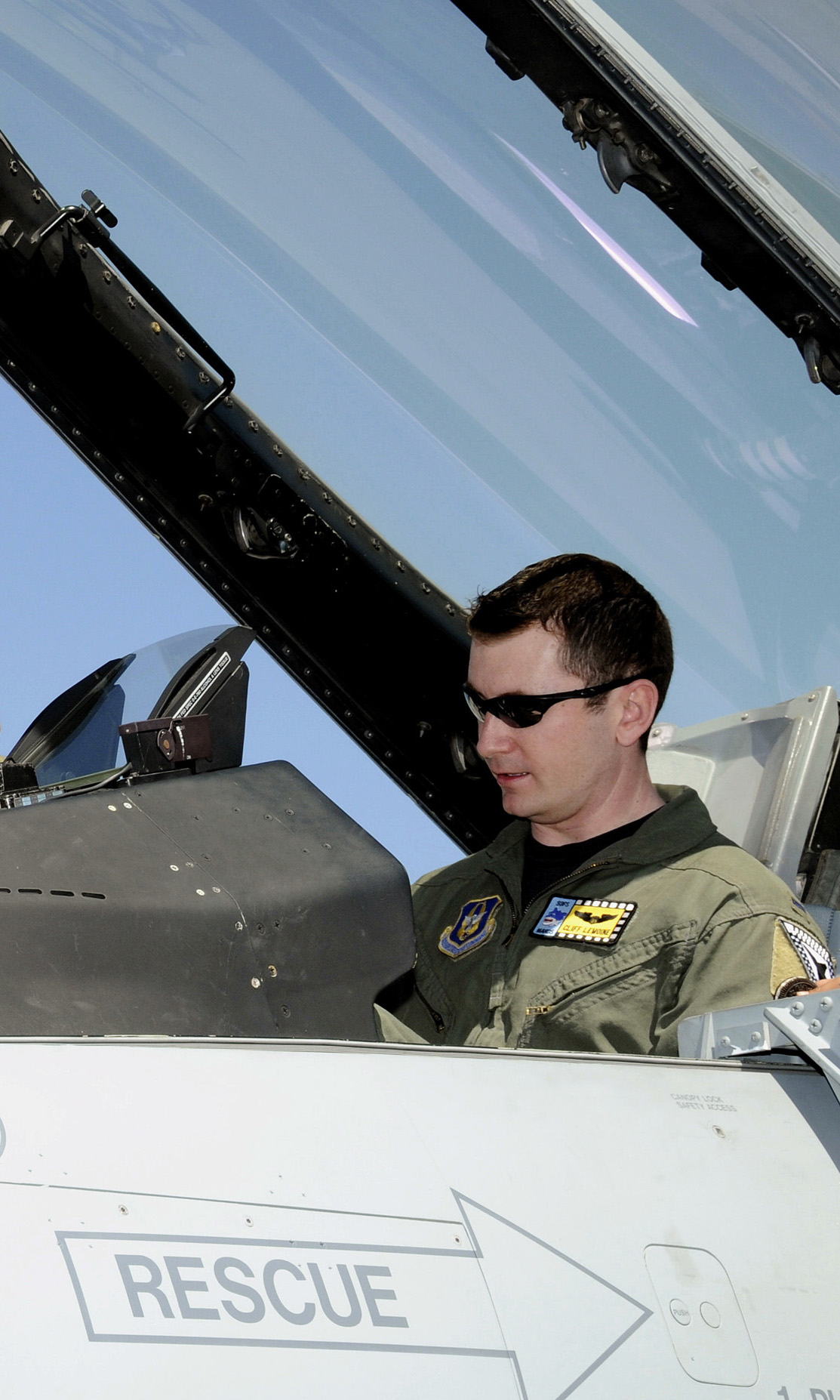
- Lemoine seated in his F-16 at Homestead Air Reserve Base, Florida
- Born: February 15, 1983 (age 43); Eunice, Louisiana, U.S.
- Education: Tulane University
- Occupations: Author; Airline pilot; Reserve fighter pilot; Reserve police officer
- Known for: Author of Spectre series and aviation analyst
- Military career
- Allegiance: United States
- Branch: United States Air Force; United States Navy
- Years: 2006–present
- Rank: Major
- Nickname: "Mover"
- Units: Air Force Reserve (2005–2012) (2018–present); United States Navy Reserve (2012–2016)
- Conflicts: War in Afghanistan; Iraq War
- Awards: Navy and Marine Corps Achievement Medal; Meritorious Service Medal; Air Medal

YouTube information
- Channel: C.W. Lemoine
- Years active: 2018–present
- Genres: Gaming; Career advising
- Subscribers: 413 thousand
- Views: 93.33 million
- Last updated: April 2024
- Website: www.cwlemoine.com

C. W. Lemoine is an American author, former military aviator, racing driver, and YouTuber who was awarded the Navy and Marine Corps Achievement Medal for his service in the reserves. His service spans a period of fifteen years in the U.S. Air Force and U.S. Navy reserves, which includes a deployment to Iraq in 2009. He has written twelve books, nine of which are part of the Spectre series.

== Personal life and education ==
Lemoine initially attended Louisiana State University but later transferred to and graduated from Tulane University in 2005 with a Bachelor of Science in Business Management studying business law and marketing. Lemoine is a brown belt and certified instructor of Survival Krav Maga.

== Career ==
=== Career as a pilot ===
Lemoine applied to the Air Force reserve and completed Air Force Officer Training School in 2006, following the completion of his training and graduation from the fighter pilot program, he was stationed in Homestead Air Reserve Base where he flew the F-16 as part of the 93rd Fighter Squadron, with the call sign "Mover". In 2009, Lemoine deployed to Iraq supporting Operation Iraqi Freedom, wherein he averaged sixty to seventy hours within two months on the F-16 and eventually accumulated a thousand hours on the aircraft.

Following the deployment, Lemoine requested, and received, a transfer to the Navy Reserves citing his unhappiness from being far from home and his father's poor health. He trained on the F/A-18 Hornet and qualified to fly the aircraft in 2012. After flying the aircraft for seven months and following the test of an upper back pain, Lemoine was diagnosed with polycystic kidney disease, suspending him from flying for a period of seven months. As a result of being unable to have the medical issue waived, Lemoine transferred back into the Air Force reserves and in 2018 was commissioned in the reserves as a major, conducting the role of adversary air with F-22 pilots while flying the T-38.

In 2015, Lemoine was awarded the Navy and Marine Corps Achievement Medal following his actions on the day that his fellow fighter pilot, Abaxes "Chili" Williams's aircraft was struck by lightning. Following the strike, Williams began to feel disoriented with his speech being slurred and was noticed by Lemoine to be slumping over in the aircraft. Lemoine guided and aided Williams on the approach and with his landing, failing the first attempt but catching the runway trap on the second. Lemoine was cleared to fly a week later, Williams was awarded the Navy Air Medal and was cleared to fly a month later.

In 2022, Lemoine was hired by American Airlines but later resigned in 2026.

=== Writing and other endeavors ===
Lemoine began writing as a way to cope with the passing of his mother when he was twelve years old. After the completion of his novella, he attempted to publish it but was unsuccessful when the book was not picked up by agents. During his downtime between the transfer from Navy to Air Force reserves, he began writing the Spectre series and self-published the books. The books contain fictional characters with real-life scenarios and events pertaining to Lemoine's life.

Lemoine is a reserve police officer in St. Tammany Parish, Louisiana and has based his book Absolute Vengeance on his experiences in law enforcement, although he has stated that the events are not correlated to his department.

Lemoine started his YouTube channel in 2018 during his career as a fighter pilot in the Air Force without a particular purpose, but soon went on to provide career advice on aviation in the military, general gaming videos as well as reaction videos to general as well as military aviation events. He received attention in 2018 for a video in which he analyzed the Greek Mirage and Turkish F-16 incidents. In August of that year, a Turkish general had stated to "not underestimate the Greeks" following the incident and the reports of Lemoine's comments.

In March 2021, Lemoine aimed to produce an air combat reality show entitled "Fight's On", which would pit one pilot against another in a dogfight. The SIAI-Marchetti S.211 trainer was the selected aircraft, but the project stalled, when fund raising fell short, as a result donations were either returned, or sent to the “Folds of Honor” charity.

In July 2023, Lemoine began a weekly podcast with fellow T-38 pilot and former Naval Aviator Trevor "Gonky" Hartsock discussing a wide variety of topics related to civil and military aviation.

== Racing career ==
In 2023, Lemoine participated in the pre-season test for the ARCA Menards Series at Daytona International Speedway, driving for Bobby Gerhart Racing, where he placed 43rd in the overall results between the two days after placing eighth in the Friday session. He was originally scheduled to drive for the team in the season opening at the track a month later, but it ultimately fell through due to sponsorship issues.

In 2025, it was revealed that Lemoine would attempt to make his ARCA Menards Series East debut at Five Flags Speedway, driving the No. 06 Toyota for Wayne Peterson Racing, although he would be replaced by Nate Moeller.

== Motorsports results ==
=== ARCA Menards Series East ===
(key) (Bold – Pole position awarded by qualifying time. Italics – Pole position earned by points standings or practice time. * – Most laps led.)

ARCA Menards Series East results
Year	Team	No.	Make	1	2	3	4	5	6	7	8	AMSEC	Pts	Ref
2025	Wayne Peterson Racing	06	Toyota	FIF; Wth	CAR	NSV	FRS	DOV	IRP	IOW	BRI	N/A	0	

== Bibliography ==
=== Fiction ===
- Spectre Rising: A Spectre Thriller (2013) (ISBN 978-1-49108-181-5)
- Avoid, Negotiate, Kill: A Spectre Thriller (2014) (ISBN 978-1-49928-189-7)
- Archangel Fallen: A Spectre Thriller (2015) (ISBN 978-1-51429-483-3)
- Executive Reaction: A Spectre Thriller (2015) (ISBN 978-1-51763-969-3)
- Brick by Brick: A Spectre Thriller (2016) (ISBN 978-1-53031-750-9)
- Stand Against Evil: A Spectre Thriller (2016) (ISBN 978-1-54064-740-5)
- Spectre Origins: A Spectre Thriller (2017) (ISBN 978-1-52156-620-6)
- Absolute Vengeance: The Alex Shepherd Story (2017) (ISBN 978-1-64008-245-8)
- The Helios Conspiracy: A Spectre Thriller (2018) (ISBN 978-1-98022-400-6)
- I Am the Sheepdog: An Alex Shepherd Novel (2018) (ISBN 978-1-98295-946-3)
- Fini Flight: A Spectre Thriller (2019) (ISBN 978-1-09765-585-4)
- N.O. Justice: An Alex Shepherd Novel (2021) (ISBN 979-8536137734)
- Project Virtus (2025) (ISBN 979-8-89590-445-9)
- AIR ONE: Origin (2026) (ISBN 979-8-9975298-1-9)
