= Hattertown, Connecticut =

- Hattertown Historic District
- U.S. National Register of Historic Places
- U.S. Historic district
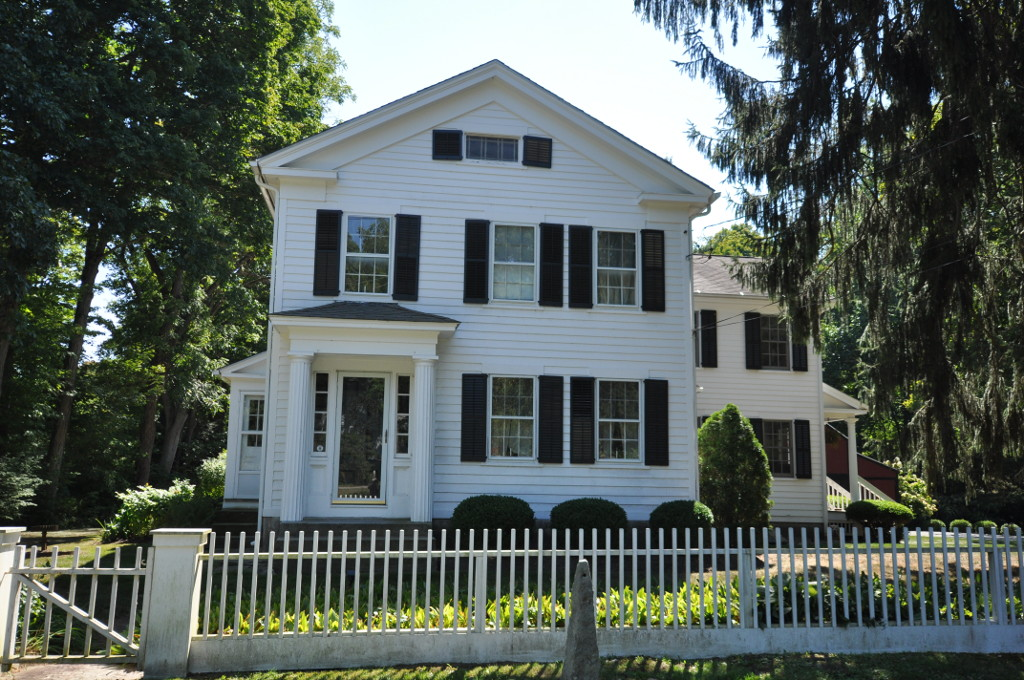

- Location within Connecticut Location within the United States
- Location: Roughly, Junction of Aunt Park Lane, Castle Meadow, Hattertown, and Hi Barlow Roads, Newtown, Connecticut
- Coordinates: 41°20′24″N 73°18′31″W
- Architect: Patchen, Isaac
- Architectural style: Colonial, Federal, Greek Revival
- NRHP reference No.: 96001461
- Added to NRHP: December 06, 1996

Hattertown is a village in the town of Newtown, Connecticut, United States that is listed on the National Register of Historic Places as the Hattertown Historic District and includes a smaller local historic district.

== History ==
Hattertown takes its name from the hat-manufacturing trade around which the village grew in the early 19th century. "Hatting" was a major economic activity in western Connecticut in the 19th century, having started in Danbury in about 1780. Hats were made from felt formed from animal fur. As hat production increased, the manufacturing activity spread from Danbury to surrounding areas where the supply of fur-bearing animals such as muskrat, fox, and beaver had not yet been depleted.

A small village existed at the site of Hattertown before 1821, when the Taylor and Benedict families arrived there and began hat production. Hattertown was later to become one of the few places in the region where an entire village was directly involved in the hat trade. Hatting in the village was a cottage industry in which hat producers made rough-formed hats for sale to wholesalers in Danbury or "front shops" in New York City where they would be finished.

Hatting continued in Hattertown until at least 1856, but it was in decline by the 1840s as fur processing and hat forming were becoming increasingly mechanized and the local supply of fur-bearing animals was largely depleted.

== Historic district ==
The Hattertown Historic District is centered on the Hattertown Green, which dates from the late 19th century and is bound by Hattertown Road, Hi Barlow Road, Gregory Lane, and the intersections of Castle Meadow Road and Aunt Park Lane. The historic district is listed on the National Register of Historic Places and includes a local historic district subject to requirements administered by the Hattertown Historic District Commission. Eleven historic residences are contributing properties of the National Register historic district, ranging in age from c.1750 (Levi Taylor House) to c.1850 (52 Aunt Park Lane). There are also several secondary structures from the same time period, such as barns, sheds, and privies that contribute to the architectural significance of the area. A schoolhouse from c.1780, now the Gregory Orchard's District School, was originally on the green (corner of Aunt Park Lane and Hattertown Road) and was moved in 1975 to its present location adjacent to the Morgan House.

== See also ==
- National Register of Historic Places listings in Fairfield County, Connecticut
