= John Glover House =

Historic house in Connecticut, United States

- U.S. National Register of Historic Places
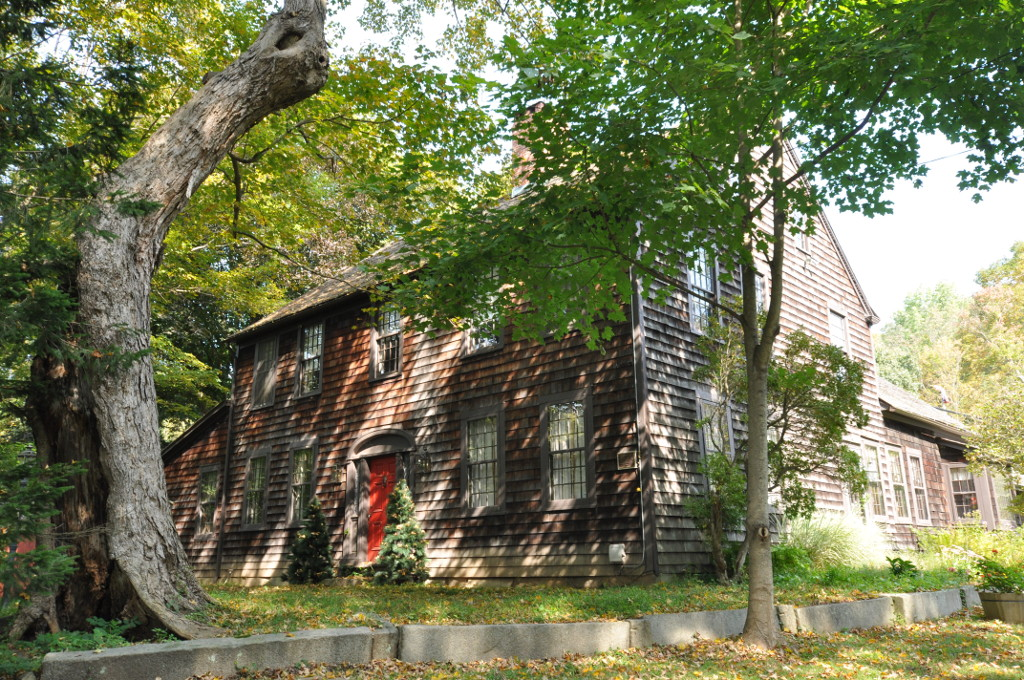

- Location within Connecticut Location within the United States
- Location: 53 Echo Valley Road, Newtown, Connecticut
- Coordinates: 41°26′49″N 73°18′34″W
- Area: 2 acres (0.81 ha)
- Built: 1708
- Architectural style: Colonial, Federal
- NRHP reference No.: 01000882
- Added to NRHP: August 17, 2001

The John Glover House is a historic house at 53 Echo Valley Road in Newtown, Connecticut, USA. Built about 1708 by an early town settler, it is a remarkably well-preserved example of 18th-century residential architecture, owned for generations by a locally prominent farming family. The house was listed on the National Register of Historic Places in 2001.

== Description and history ==
The John Glover House stands in a rural-residential area of northern Newtown, on 2 acres (0.81 ha) at the junction of Echo Valley and Alberts Hill Roads. It is a 2 1/2-story wood-frame structure, clad in wooden shingles, with a side-gable roof and a large central chimney. A series of additions extend from the rear of the house. The main facade is five bays wide, with sash windows arranged symmetrically around a center entrance. The entrance is framed by a Federal-period surround, with sidelight windows and pilasters to either side, and a fanlight in a semi-elliptical pediment above. The interior follows a typical colonial center chimney plan, with hall and parlor to either side and the kitchen behind the chimney. The building's construction details reveal an evolutionary growth of the structure, with its second floor probably added in the mid-18th century.

The house was built about 1708 by John Glover of Stratford, who purchased land in this area acquired by the town's first proprietors from Native Americans in 1705. Glover became one of Newtown's largest taxpayers, farming the surrounding land and serving in town and colonial legislative offices. Subsequent generations of Glovers owned the property, and continued the practice of farming and civic service. The house was sold out of the family in 1965; at that time, its only modern amenity was a telephone.

== See also ==
- Glover House (Newtown, Connecticut), also NRHP-listed in Newtown
- List of the oldest buildings in Connecticut
- National Register of Historic Places listings in Fairfield County, Connecticut
