= Dominik Knoll =

Italian real estate investor

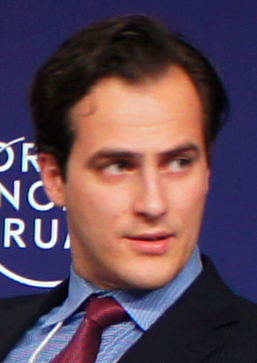
- Dominik Knoll at the 2011 World Economic Forum
- Born: Bolzano, Italy
- Education: Freeman School of Business, Tulane University
- Occupation: private equity investor

Dominik Knoll is a real estate investor. He was the CEO of the World Trade Center New Orleans from May 2010 to December 2016.

== Biography ==
Dominik Knoll received his MBA from the Freeman School of Business and also studied at the Warwick Business School and Purdue University; he is also an alumnus of the Executive Education program at Northwestern University's Kellogg School of Management. In addition, he holds a Master of Science degree in management from the School of Management at the University of Innsbruck, Austria. He has been a guest at conferences such as the Clinton Global Initiative and the World Economic Forum. Knoll is a regular contributor to the Huffington Post and has been featured in several national and international publications including the Wall Street Journal, Fortune, Forbes Magazine, China Daily, and others.

Knoll currently serves on the boards of Congressman Steve Scalise's Energy Advisory Group, French American Chamber of Commerce, Italy-America Chamber of Commerce of Louisiana, Loyola University International Business Council, and was recently appointed by Louisiana Governor Bobby Jindal to the Louisiana Board of International Commerce. He also serves as an executive advisor on the Council on Competitiveness U.S. Manufacturing Competitiveness Initiative and a steering committee member for the Campaign to Fix the Debt.

In 2013, Knoll was recognized as one of the 10 most distinguished Italians living and working in the U.S. by the Italy America Chamber of Commerce. Knoll was also featured in New Orleans Magazine's 2010 "People to Watch" article.

In 2007, he published his Master's Thesis as a book in German: Unternehmensnetzwerke: Erfolgreich einem Netzwerk - Cluster beitreten, at the self-publishing publisher VDM, Saarbruecken.
