= Forebitter =

American band

Forebitter is an American band with an international following specializing in sea shanties. It consists of four "chanteymen" employed by Mystic Seaport museum in Mystic, Connecticut, United States: Geoff Kaufman, Rick Spencer, David Littlefield, and Craig Edwards. The band has performed throughout the U.S., Canada and Europe.

== Discography ==
- Voyages: Forebitter Sings Songs of the Sea, Volume II (Mystic Seaport Museum, 2000)
- Link of Chain: Forebitter Sings Songs of the Sea, Volume I (Mystic Seaport Museum, 1999)
- American Sea Chanteys (Mystic Seaport Museum, 1998), reissued as Chants Des Marins Américains (Le Chasse Marée 2002)
- Unmooring (Mystic Seaport Museum, 1995)
- On the Ran-Tan (1989)
