= Rick Spencer (singer) =

American singer-songwriter (born 1952)

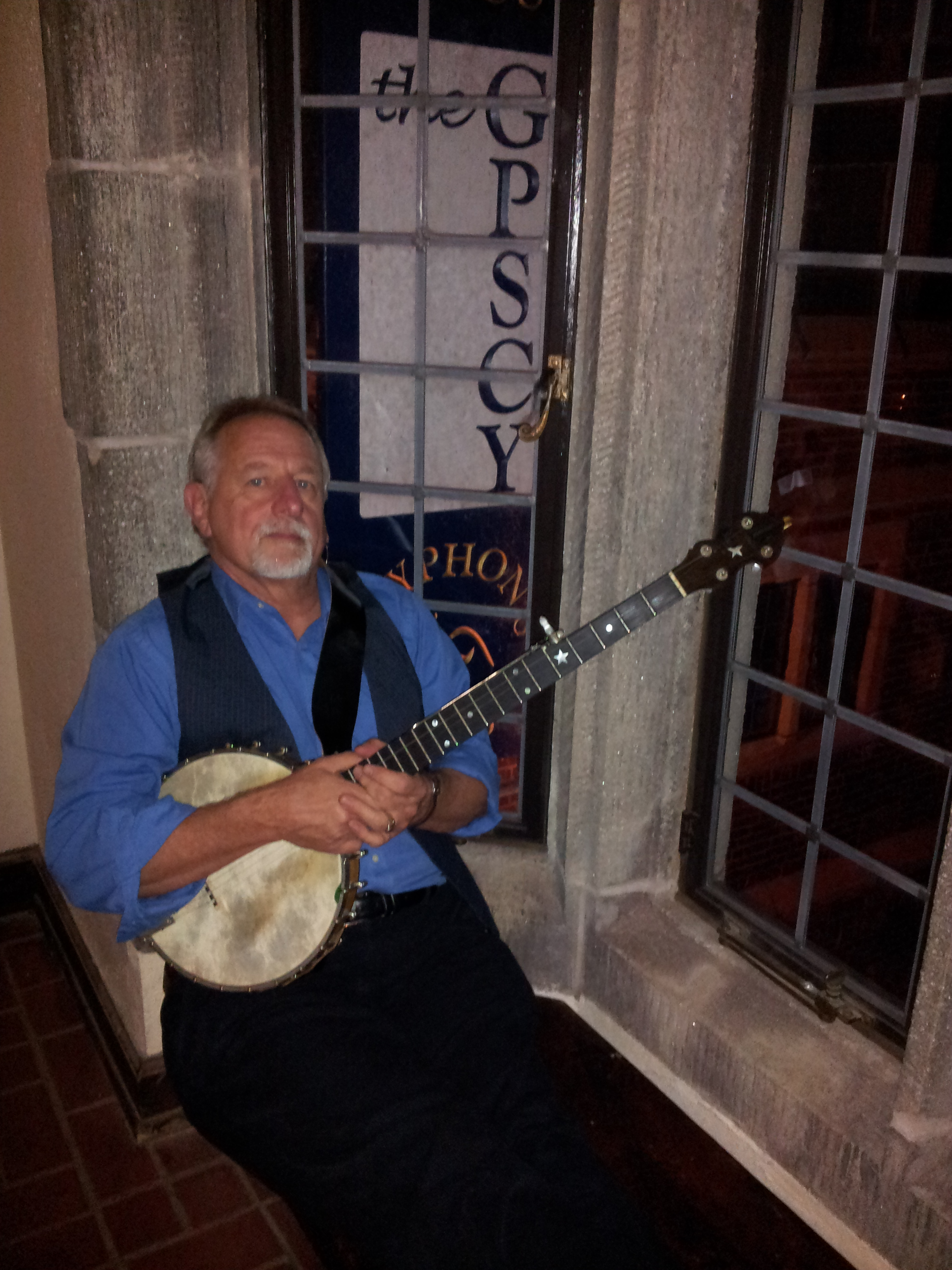
- Spencer in 2015

Background information
- Birth name: Richard Eugene Spencer
- Born: October 21, 1952 (age 72); Fort Huachuca, Arizona, United States
- Genres: Folk, Sea Shanty, Traditional Historical Music, Americana
- Occupation(s): Musician, songwriter, historian
- Instrument(s): Guitar, banjo, mandolin, Appalachian dulcimer, concertina
- Years active: 1986–present
- Website: www.catfeather.com

Rick Spencer (born October 21, 1952, Fort Huachuca, Arizona) is an American folk singer-songwriter and musical historian. He grew up in Newtown, Connecticut, and graduated from Western Connecticut State University in 1975.

== Associated acts ==
Spencer was a founding member of Forebitter with whom he toured extensively and recorded five albums.

He is a current member of the Jovial Crew and the trio, LongSplice, with Joseph Morneault and Dawn Indermuehle.

Spencer worked with Stan Hugill delving into the history of sea music and singing sea shanties. He worked for 20 years as a staff musician, interpreter, researcher and program developer at Mystic Seaport Museum. He is recognized internationally, as an authority on the history and presentation of English language maritime music.

He has been on stage with Pete Seeger, Oscar Brand, Paul Winter, John Roberts, Jerry Bryant and many others.
