= Connecticut Route 135 =

State highway in Fairfield County, Connecticut, US

Route 135
- Map of Fairfield County in southwestern Connecticut with Route 135 highlighted in red

Route information
- Maintained by CTDOT
- Length: 2.58 mi (4.15 km)
- Existed: by 1953–present

Major junctions
- South end: US 1 in Fairfield
- I-95 in Fairfield
- North end: Route 58 in Fairfield

Location
- Country: United States
- State: Connecticut
- Counties: Fairfield

Highway system
- Connecticut State Highway System; Interstate; US; State; SSR; SR; Scenic
| ← Route 133 | → Route 136 |

Route 135 is a Connecticut state highway running entirely in the town of Fairfield. It connects Interstate 95 (I-95) and U.S. Route 1 (US 1) in Downtown Fairfield to Route 58 in the northern part of town.

== Route description ==
Route 135 begins as North Benson Road at an intersection with US 1 in Downtown Fairfield and heads north, intersecting I-95 at Southbound exit 25A about 0.2 miles (0.32 km) later. Route 135 continues north, passing by Fairfield University, then turns right onto Stillson Road. It then heads northeast for another 0.6 miles (0.97 km) until it ends at an intersection with Route 58. Route 135 is two lanes wide and is classified as a minor arterial road for its entire length. It carries traffic volumes of about 14,600 per day.

== History ==
The first Connecticut road signed as 135 was State Highway 135, a road connecting New Haven and North Branford designated as such during the 1920s. This route followed a section of contemporary Route 80.

In 1932, Route 135 was created as a 9.07 miles (14.60 km) road connecting Southbury to Middlebury. This route was abolished in 1943, and it was absorbed into contemporary Route 188.

The current iteration of Route 135 was created in 1953.

Near its southern terminus at US 1, a Metro-North bridge carrying the New Haven Line runs over the route. In 2001, as part of a plan to replace the bridge, the Connecticut Department of Transportation proposed widening Route 135 to four lanes. Due to concerns about the induced demand a widened road may attract, local officials ultimately scrapped widening plans for the road.

== Junction list ==
The entire route is in Fairfield, Fairfield County.

| mi | km | Destinations | Notes |
|---|---|---|---|
| 0.00 | 0.00 | US 1 (Post Road) | Southern terminus |
| 0.15 | 0.24 | I-95 north – New Haven | Exit 25A on I-95 south |
| 2.58 | 4.15 | Route 58 (Black Rock Turnpike) | Northern terminus |
1.000 mi = 1.609 km; 1.000 km = 0.621 mi
