= Caleb Baldwin Tavern =

Historic tavern in Connecticut, US

- U.S. National Register of Historic Places
- U.S. Historic district – Contributing property
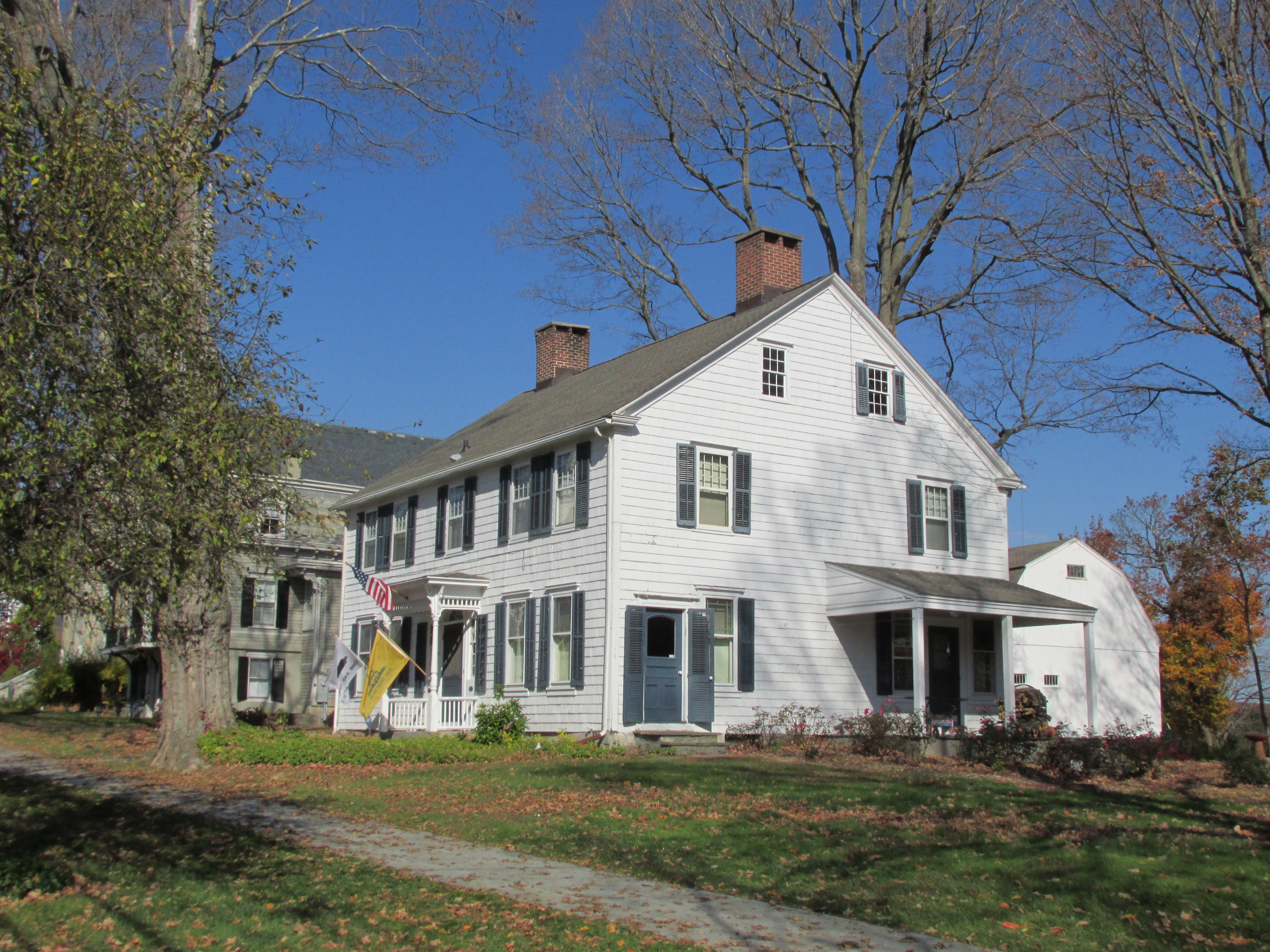
- 32 Main Street

- Location within Connecticut Location within the United States
- Location: 32 Main Street, Newtown, Connecticut
- Coordinates: 41°24′46″N 73°18′31″W
- Area: less than one acre
- Built: 1763
- Architectural style: Colonial, Federal
- Part of: Newtown Borough Historic District (ID96001458)
- MPS: Rochambeau's Army in Connecticut, 1780-1782 MPS
- NRHP reference No.: 02000869

Significant dates
- Added to NRHP: August 23, 2002
- Designated CP: December 20, 1996

The Caleb Baldwin Tavern is a historic house at 32 Main Street in the Newtown Borough Historic District in Newtown, Connecticut, built around 1763. The two-and-a-half-story house is considered historically significant for its role in movement of French Army forces under General Rochambeau, as it housed some of the army's officers in June 1781 on their march to the Siege of Yorktown. It is also an example of traditional 18th-century New England architecture and retains some details from that time period. It was listed on the National Register of Historic Places on August 23, 2002.

== Description and history ==
The former Caleb Baldwin Tavern is located in Newtown's village center on the east side of Main Street (Connecticut Route 25) a short way south of its junction with Church Hill Road (U.S. Route 6). It is a 2 1/2-story wood-frame structure with a side gable roof and shingled exterior. The roof is pierced by two brick chimneys. Its main façade is five bays wide with sash windows arranged symmetrically around the center entrance. The entry is sheltered by a Victorian-era porch with jigsaw brackets and a spindled frieze. The entry is flanked by pilasters which support an arched molding and sunburst fanlight. A secondary entrance is located on the south side of the building, sheltered by a 20th-century shed roof porch. The interior follows a central hall plan.

The tavern was built around 1763 and represents a good early example of the two-chimney center hall plan. It was one of several buildings that hosted French officers in 1781 and 1782 when the army of Rochambeau marched across Connecticut between Virginia and Providence, Rhode Island. The Baldwins are known to have hosted Claude Blanchard, Rochambeau's commissary who arrived in advance of the troops to arrange housing and supplies.

As of 2025, the tavern is now a private residence.

== See also ==
- March Route of Rochambeau's army
- List of historic sites preserved along Rochambeau's route
- National Register of Historic Places listings in Fairfield County, Connecticut
