= Crown Crafts =

- Traded as: Nasdaq: CRWS; Russell Microcap Index component

Crown Crafts is a publicly held American company headquartered in Gonzales, Louisiana. The company designs, markets and distributes infant, toddler and juvenile consumer products. Its stock is traded on the NASDAQ Capital Market under the ticker symbol "CRWS".

== Company overview ==
The company was founded in northern Georgia in 1957 by Irving Ostuw as Janyjo Inc. Its operations were originally limited to the manufacture and distribution of adult bedding, primarily tufted bedspreads, and the company added jacquard-woven bedspreads in 1967.

The company went public in 1968 on the American Stock Exchange, under the symbol CRW.

In 1984, Crown Crafts purchased Decorator Comforters Inc. for $4m, using cash from a loan.

By 1988 the company had the largest integrated flocking facility in the US.

In 1994 the company's shares were offered on the New York Stock Exchange, again under "CRW".

In 1995, the company began to enter the market for infant and juvenile products through several acquisitions, including "Red Calliope" for $16m. and Pinky Baby in 1998. Following several years of unprofitability, the company in 2000 remade itself as primarily a marketer of infant and juvenile products. During this time, the company stopped manufacturing adult woven products and began sourcing its infant and juvenile products through foreign contract manufacturers, with the largest concentration in China.

The adult bedding division was bought out by a management team, on 23 July 2001. This included the Calvin Klein Home brand (Crown Crafts Designer Inc.) as well as Royal Sateen and Private Label. The new company was called Design Works Inc.

The company relocated its headquarters from Atlanta, Georgia to Gonzales, Louisiana in 2002. It also operates a leased distribution center in Compton, California, a sales office in Bentonville, Arkansas, and a Foreign Representative Office in Shanghai, China.

The company operates indirectly through its wholly owned subsidiaries, Hamco, Inc. and Crown Crafts Infant Products, Inc. Sales of the company’s products are generally made directly to retailers, which are primarily mass merchants, mid-tier retailers, juvenile specialty stores, restaurants, internet accounts and wholesale clubs. The company’s products are marketed under a variety of company-owned trademarks, primarily NoJo™ and Neat Solutions™. The company also markets products under trademarks licensed from others and as private label goods.

== Products ==
The company’s products are primarily geared for infants, toddlers and juveniles, and include crib and toddler bedding, blankets, nursery accessories, room décor, nap mats and disposable and reusable bibs and floor mats.

== See also ==
- Microcap stock
- Graco (baby products)
