= Newtown, Connecticut =

- Town
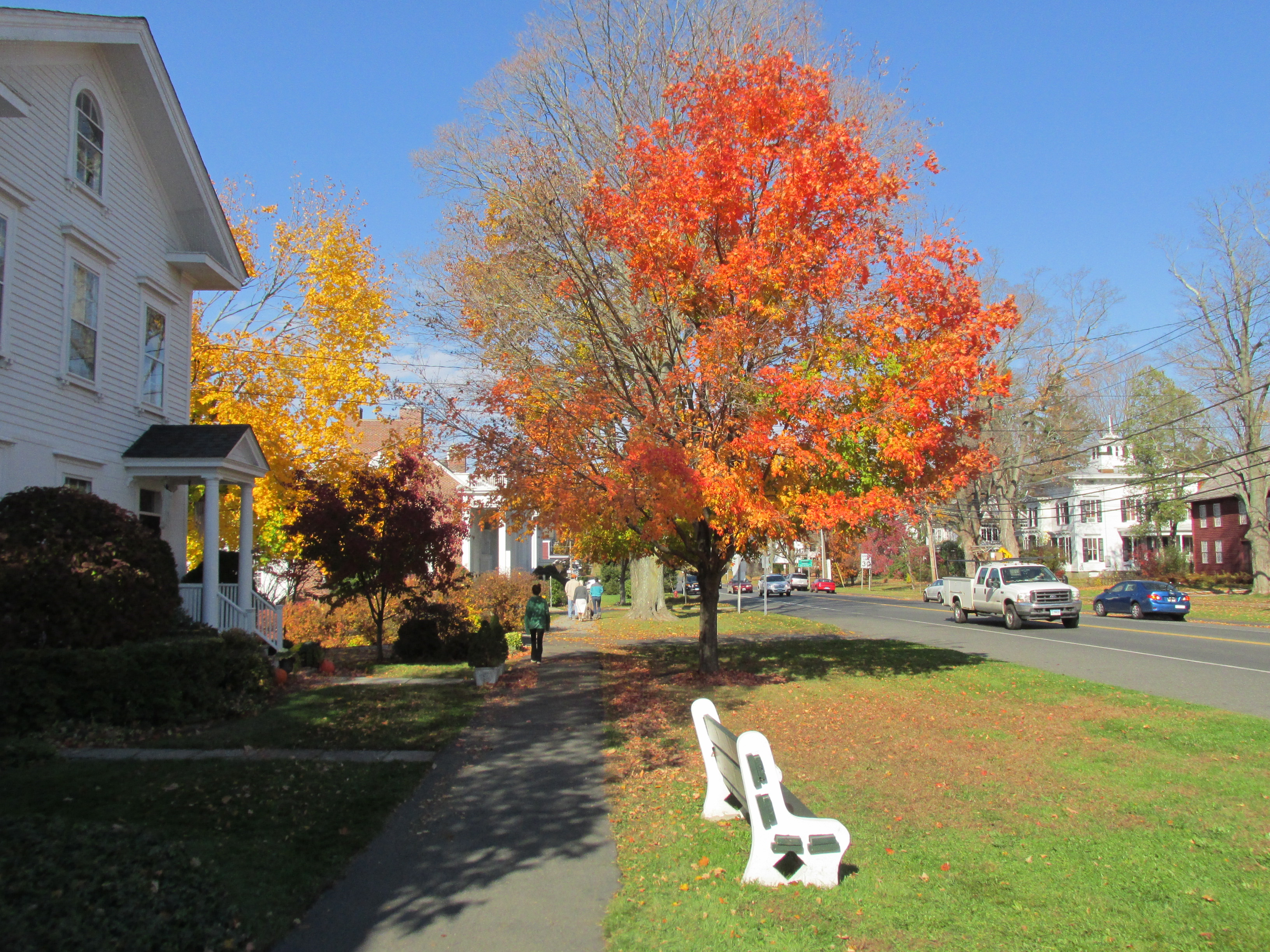
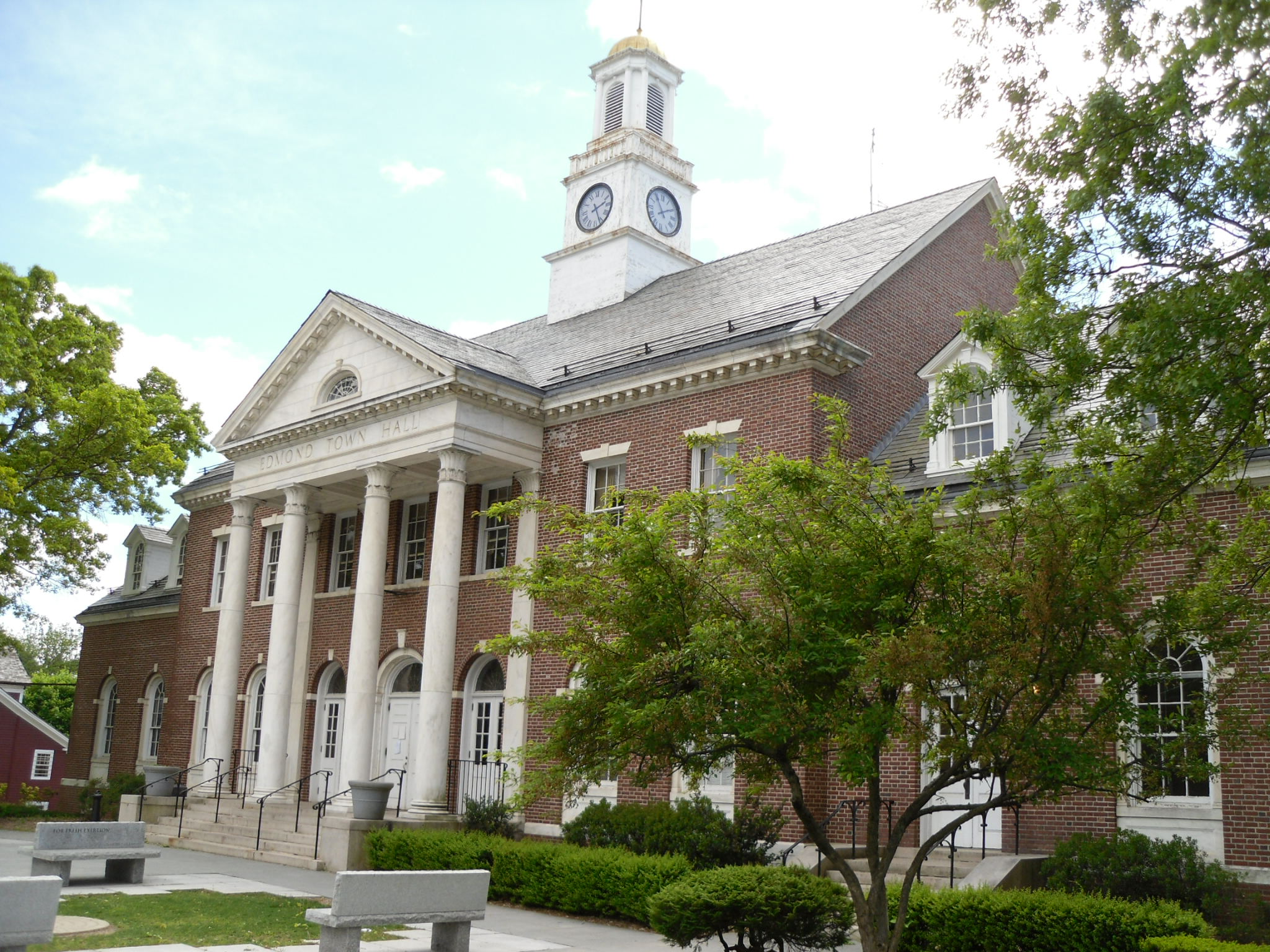
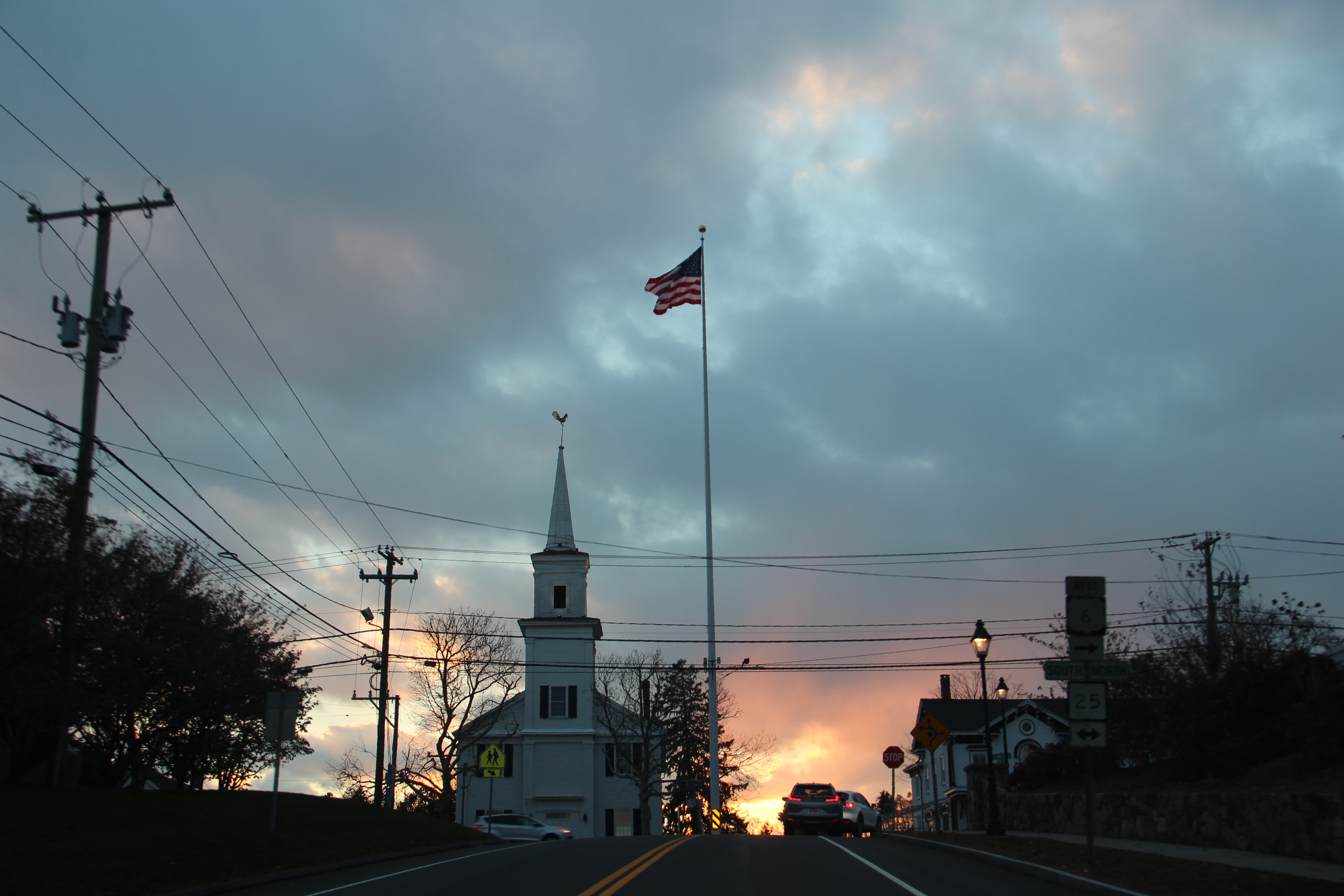
- Main Street Edmond Town Hall Town Center

- Flag Seal

- Coordinates: 41°24′48″N 73°18′32″W
- Country: United States
- U.S. state: Connecticut
- County: Fairfield
- Region: Western CT
- Incorporated: 1711

Government
  - Type: Select board
  - First selectman: Bruce Walczac (D)
  - Selectman: Dan Cruson Jr. (D)
  - Selectman: Michelle Embree Ku (D)

Area
  - Total: 57.66 sq mi (149.3 km^{2})
  - Land: 57.66 sq mi (149.3 km^{2})
  - Water: 0 sq mi (0.00 km^{2})
- Elevation: 397 ft (121 m)

Population (2020)
  - Total: 27,173
  - Density: 471.3/sq mi (182.0/km^{2})
- Time zone: UTC−5 (Eastern Standard Time)
  - Summer (DST): UTC−4 (Eastern Daylight Time)
- ZIP Codes: 06470, 06482
- Area codes: 203/475
- FIPS code: 09-52980
- GNIS ID: 0213475
- Website: www.newtown-ct.gov

Newtown (/ˈnutaʊn/ NOO-town) is a town in Fairfield County, Connecticut, United States. It is part of the Greater Danbury area as well as the New York metropolitan area. Newtown was founded in 1705, and later incorporated in 1711. As of the 2020 census, its population was 27,173. The town is part of the Western Connecticut Planning Region.

== History ==
In 1705, English colonists purchased the Townsite from the Pohtatuck Indians, a branch of the Pasgussett. It was originally known as Quanneapague. Settled by migrants from Stratford and incorporated in 1711, Newtown residents had many business and trading ties with the English. It was a stronghold of Tory sentiment during the early Revolutionary War. Late in the war, French General Rochambeau and his troops encamped there in 1781 during their celebrated march on their way to the siege of Yorktown, Virginia, which ended the Revolution.

An important crossroads throughout its early history, the village of Hawleyville briefly emerged as a railroad center. The town's population grew to over 4,000 c. 1881. In the following decades, the population dwindled to a low of 2,635 in 1930 before again growing.

Local industry has included the manufacture of furniture, tea bags, combs, fire hoses, folding boxes, buttons, and hats, as well as farming, and mica and feldspar mining. The game of Scrabble was developed here by James Brunot.

From the period of highway development and suburbanization following World War II, the town has developed as a suburb of Danbury, with many people also commuting to Norwalk, Stamford, and Bridgeport.

=== The Newtown Bee ===
The local newspaper, The Newtown Bee has been the hometown media outlet since June 1877, under Publisher John Pearce of Bethel. The Smith family purchased the newspaper in 1881 and has continuously operated it since that time.

=== Sandy Hook Elementary School shooting ===
On December 14, 2012, Adam Lanza shot and killed his mother in her home and then drove to Sandy Hook Elementary School, where he killed 20 1st-grade children and six adult staff. He committed suicide when police arrived at the school. The event reignited a national debate regarding access to firearms by people with mental illness and gun laws in the United States.

== Geography ==
The northeastern border of the town is a natural border that follows the Housatonic River.

According to the United States Census Bureau, the town has a total area of 59.1 sq mi (153 km^{2}), of which 57.8 sq mi (150 km^{2}) is land and 1.3 sq mi (3.4 km^{2}), or 2.22%, is water. Newtown is located in northern Fairfield County, about 45 mi (72 km) southwest of Hartford and about 42 mi (68 km) northeast of New York City. The state's fifth largest town in area, it is bordered by Bethel, Bridgewater, Brookfield, Easton, Monroe, Oxford, Redding and Southbury.

=== Principal communities ===
- Botsford (ZIP code 06470)
- Dodgingtown
- Hattertown
- Hawleyville (ZIP code 06470)
- Newtown Borough (ZIP code 06470)
- Rocky Glen
- Sandy Hook (ZIP code 06482) (including Berkshire, Riverside, Walnut Tree Hill, and Zoar communities)

Smaller communities include Camelot, Head of Meadow (not necessarily related to Head O'Meadow Elementary School), Hopewell, Huntingtown, Lands End, Middle Gate, Palestine, and Taunton.

== Demographics ==
Historical population
Year	Pop.	±%
1756	1,253	—
1774	2,229	+77.9%
1782	2,404	+7.9%
1790	2,764	+15.0%
1800	2,903	+5.0%
1810	2,834	−2.4%
1820	2,879	+1.6%
1830	3,096	+7.5%
1840	3,189	+3.0%
1850	3,338	+4.7%
1860	3,578	+7.2%
1870	3,681	+2.9%
1880	4,013	+9.0%
1890	3,539	−11.8%
1900	3,276	−7.4%
1910	3,012	−8.1%
1920	2,751	−8.7%
1930	2,635	−4.2%
1940	4,023	+52.7%
1950	7,448	+85.1%
1960	11,373	+52.7%
1970	16,942	+49.0%
1980	19,107	+12.8%
1990	20,779	+8.8%
2000	25,031	+20.5%
2010	27,560	+10.1%
2020	27,173	−1.4%
Source: U.S. Decennial Census

As of the 2020 census, the total population was 27,179 in 9,934 households. As of the census of 2000, there were 25,031 people, 8,325 households, and 6,776 families residing in the town. The population density was 433.4/sq mi (167.3/km^{2}). There were 8,601 housing units at an average density of 148.9/sq mi (57.5/km^{2}). The racial makeup of the town was 95.14% White, 1.75% Black or African American, 0.14% Native American, 1.40% Asian, 0.04% Pacific Islander, 0.64% from other races, and 0.89% from two or more races. Hispanic or Latino of any race were 2.36% of the population.

There were 8,325 households, out of which 44.7% had children under the age of 18 living with them, 73.3% were married couples living together, 5.8% had a female householder with no husband present, and 18.6% were non-families. 14.8% of all households were made up of individuals, and 5.8% had someone living alone who was 65 years of age or older. The average household size was 2.90 and the average family size was 3.24.

In the town, the population was spread out, with 29.3% under the age of 18, 4.4% from 18 to 24, 32.5% from 25 to 44, 25.1% from 45 to 64, and 8.7% who were 65 years of age or older. The median age was 38 years. For every 100 females, there were 104.9 males. For every 100 females age 18 and over, there were 103.5 males.

In 2007, the median income for a household in the town was $101,937 and the median income for a family was $119,175. About 2.2% of families and 3.1% of the population were below the poverty line, including 3.0% of those under age 18 and 3.9% of those age 65 or over.

== Parks and recreation ==
The town of Newtown offers many programs for area residents. Numerous parks and fields offer playgrounds, swimming, tennis, softball, baseball, volleyball, lacrosse, soccer, as well as a nature center and trails. Prominent Newtown parks include Treadwell Park, Dickinson Park, and Collis P. Huntington State Park. Treadwell Park, named after former selectman Timothy Treadwell, contains recreation facilities and the town pool. Dickinson park used to contain a swimming pool, which was a large asphalt-lined bowl-shaped depression surrounded by a grass "beach". It was a uniquely safe design for children because there was no "deep end"; however, it lacked a formal filtration system and required attendants to periodically row out and manually add chlorine to the water. The asphalt was removed and the pond pool filled with earth in 2006.

== Government ==
Newtown town vote by party in presidential elections
Year	Democratic	Republican	Third Parties
2024	53.92% 9,316	44.13% 7,624	1.95% 331
2020	56.1% 9,695	42.2% 7,292	1.7% 282
2016	48.49% 7,448	46.58% 7,154	4.93% 757
2012	47.12% 6,784	51.75% 7,451	1.13% 163
2008	51.14% 7,764	47.89% 7,270	0.97% 148
2004	45.21% 6,540	53.50% 7,740	1.29% 186
2000	45.23% 5,606	48.89% 6,059	5.88% 729
1996	41.90% 4,454	46.13% 4,904	11.97% 1,272
1992	33.16% 3,783	43.30% 4,940	23.55% 2,687
1988	35.08% 3,403	64.11% 6,220	0.81% 79
1984	28.18% 2,697	71.42% 6,835	0.40% 38
1980	26.92% 2,365	58.20% 5,113	14.88% 1,307
1976	36.54% 2,946	62.79% 5,062	0.67% 54
1972	27.73% 2,023	70.80% 5,165	1.47% 107
1968	31.60% 1,877	61.54% 3,655	6.85% 407
1964	51.76% 2,496	48.24% 2,326	0.00% 0
1960	34.69% 1,517	65.31% 2,856	0.00% 0
1956	23.70% 818	76.30% 2,634	0.00% 0

In Connecticut politics, the town of Newtown is required to have both a Democratic and a Republican Town Committee. The Town Committee members vote on which candidates to endorse for public elections. Elected to a two-year term, the Board of Selectmen supervise the administration of the affairs of the town, except those matters which by the General Statute or Town Charter are exclusively committed to the Board of Education or other departments. They are led by a First Selectman, who is the Chief Executive and Administrative Officer of the town. The Board of Selectmen, with the assistance of the departments and boards and commission, prepares the annual budget for the town in February. The Board of Education prepares and passes an education budget for the town schools at the same time. Both budgets then proceed to the Board of Finance, who reviews the town budget and education budget before being sent to the Legislative Council. The Legislative Council of 12 members (elected to the same two-year terms) acts as the legislative body of the town and has the power to pass ordinances and approve budgets for referendums. Final budget approval is subject to a town-wide referendum. These procedures are set forth in the Town Charter adopted and reviewed by the citizens.

The Borough of Newtown occupies about 1,252 acres (5.07 km^{2}) (or roughly two square miles) in the central part of town. Incorporated in 1824 by an act of the Connecticut General Assembly, it is one of only nine boroughs in the state. The borough adopted zoning for the town center long before the rest of the community. The lot sizes are smaller than the minimum 1-acre (4,000 m^{2}) lots of the rest of the community. The borough also has running public water provided by the Water & Sewer Authority. Much of the borough is sewered, whereas most of the rest of the town have wells and septic systems.

=== Law enforcement ===
The Newtown Police Department was founded in 1971.

== Landmarks ==
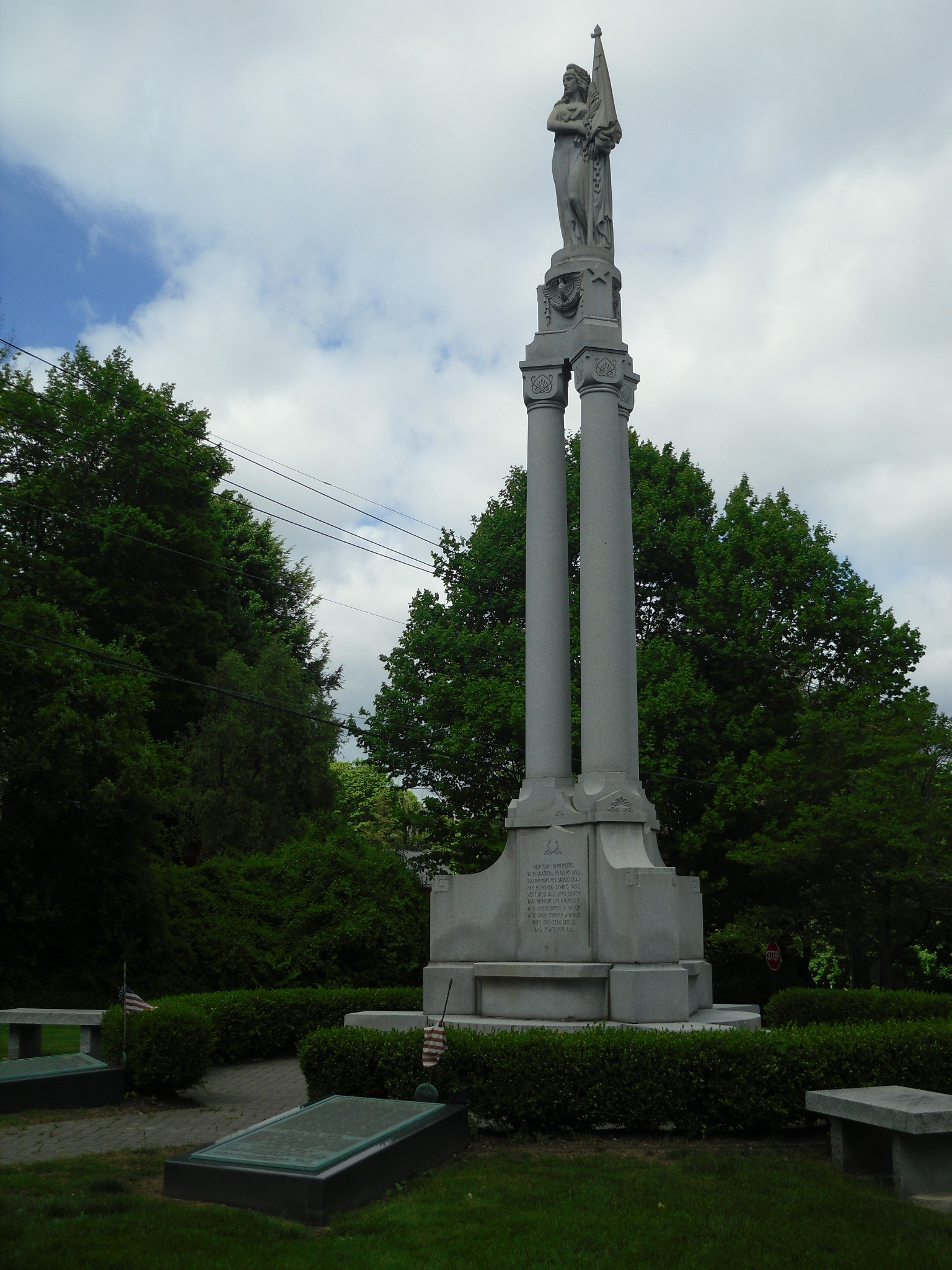
Liberty and Peace (World War I memorial)

Newtown has a number of local landmarks. The flagpole, first erected in 1876, now stands in the center of Main Street. Across from the flagpole is Newtown Meeting House, which served as the town's Congregational church for many years. The rooster weather vane (a town symbol), located atop the meeting house, is said to have been used as a target by French soldiers encamped here in 1781 during the Revolutionary War.

Hawley School is a landmark constructed in the 1920s. It has been used as a whole-town school, a high school, and an elementary school, its current function. Though it has served many different school functions, its original section has remained much the same. Two additions have been added.

Newtown is the site of Fairfield Hills Hospital, a state psychiatric hospital constructed in the 1930s and closed in 1995. The hospital was used as the set of the juvenile facility in the film Sleepers in 1995. In 2004, Newtown purchased the property and, as of 2007, was considering a controversial plan for redevelopment. In 2008, the Newtown Youth Academy began to operate there; extracurricular amenities include a fitness section, basketball courts, and a turf field.

=== Edmond Town Hall ===
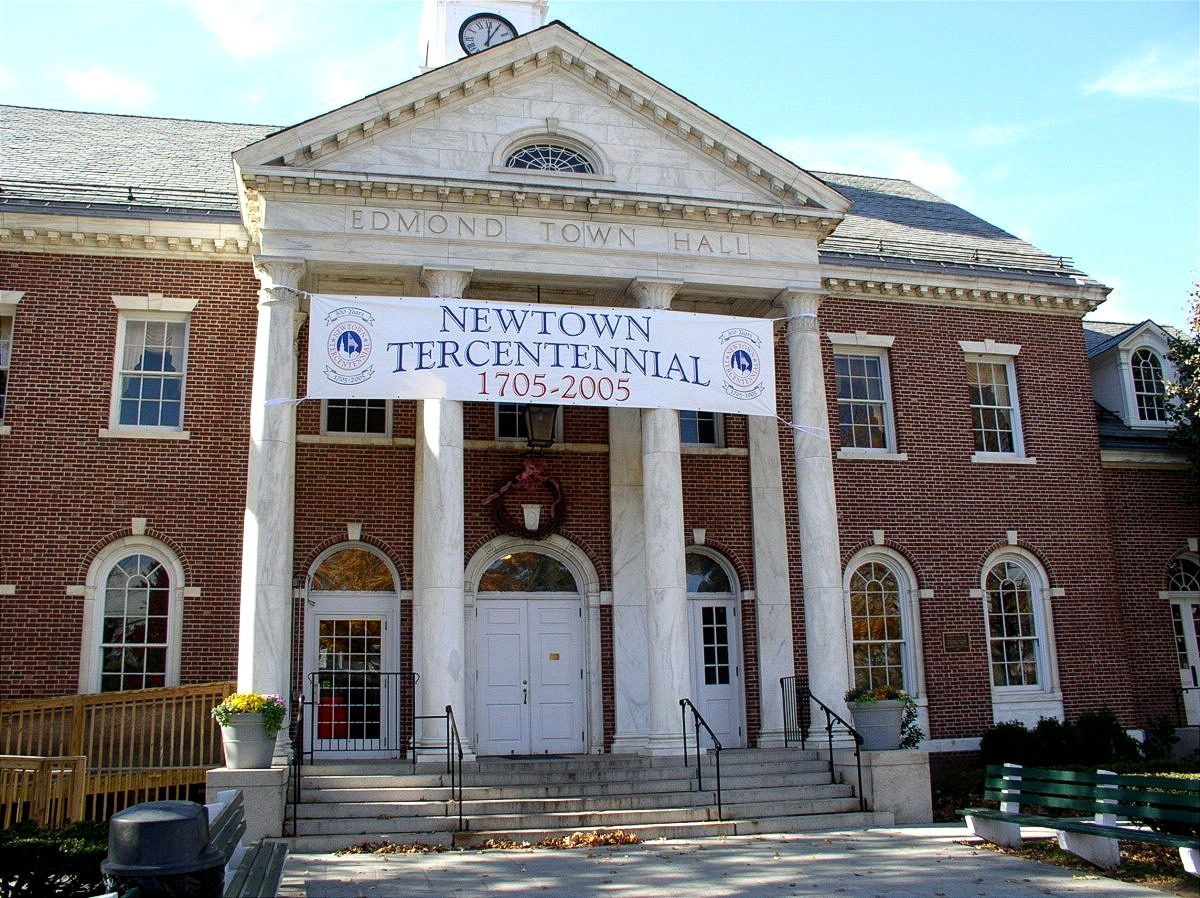
Edmond Town Hall

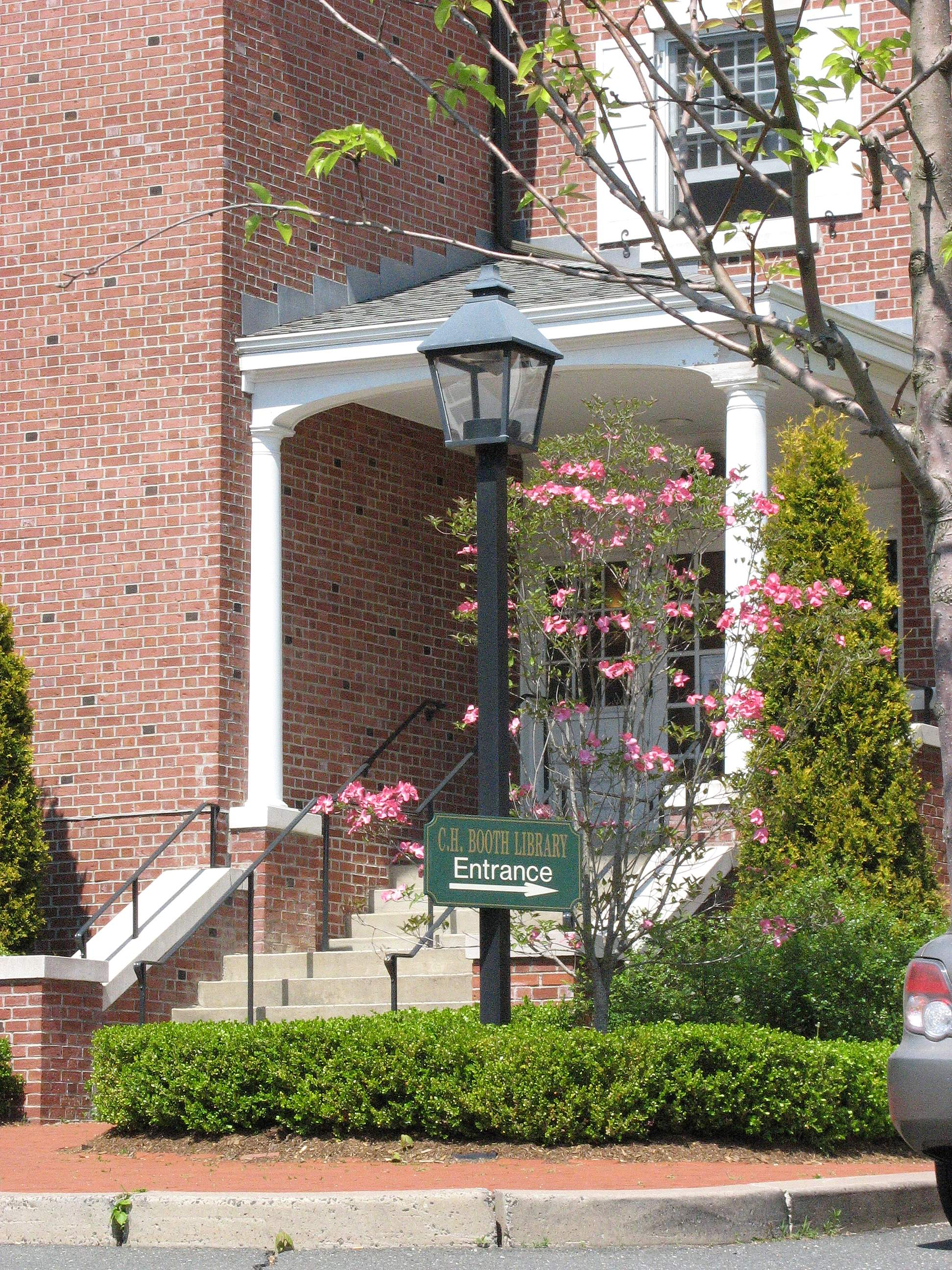
Cyrenius H. Booth Library, 2007

Edmond Town Hall is used for public-private purposes. Offices for the town were located there, but have since been moved to a new building in the Fairfield Hills property. The facility offers private rental of the Alexandria Room for weddings and other events; and smaller meeting rooms that can be reserved; a gymnasium used for community sports, private parties, and craft shows.

The Edmond Town hall is notable for its cinema. The theater occasionally shows popular films shortly after they leave mainstream theaters. It is the only $3 film theater in Connecticut. It is a popular spot for middle school and high school students.

The theater was a venue for the Newtown Friends of Music chamber music concerts, the Flagpole Radio Café productions, lecture series, comedians and numerous tribute bands. A "Live at the Edmond Town Hall" concert series was created by Newtown resident Hayden Bates in 2009. In 2014, the theater showed a classic film series in the Someday Cinema Series using community business sponsorship.

The Board of Managers of the Hall has six members serving six-year terms. At each regular Town Election, two members are elected, representing different political parties. According to Town Charter, the Board "shall have the exclusive care and maintenance of Edmond Town Hall and all grounds and buildings appurtenant thereto, together with all powers and duties prescribed for said Board by Special Act No. 98 of the 1931 session by which it was created, as amended by Special Act No. 517 of the 1953 session".

The architect was Philip Sutherland, who also designed Cyrenius H. Booth Library. The Town Hall was constructed for the community by a local benefactress Mary Elizabeth Hawley and dedicated in 1930. The building was named for Miss Hawley's maternal great-grandfather Judge William Edmond.

=== Cyrenius H. Booth Library ===
Newtown's public library was opened December 17, 1932, with a capacity for 25,000 volumes. The library is a posthumous gift of Mary Elizabeth Hawley. She named it for her maternal grandfather, a doctor in town from 1820 until his death in 1871. Hawley's gift paid for construction of the building and an endowment (a trust fund of about $250,000). As a result, the town did not have to provide any financial support to the library until the 1980s.

Designed by Philip Sutherland, the building was considered one of the most modern libraries of its time, with several innovative features. The building was fireproof, had cork floors and acoustic ceiling tiles to deaden sound, and had a built-in humidifying unit and a centralized vacuum cleaner.

In January 1998 an addition to the rear of the building was completed and officially opened. The expansion doubled the available floor space. It provides areas for meetings and displays of art and local historical artifacts from the library's large collection.

=== National Register of Historic Places ===
- Caleb Baldwin Tavern – 32 Main Street (added September 23, 2002)
- Camps Nos. 10 and 41 of Rochambeau's Army, archeological site on grounds of Hawley School (added June 6, 2002)
- Fairfield Hills Hospital (added 2024)
- Glover House – 50 Main Street (added March 11, 1982)
- Hattertown Historic District – Roughly, junction of Aunt Park Lane, Castle Meadow, Hattertown, and Hi Barlow Roads (added 1996)
- John Glover House – 53 Echo Valley Road (added September 17, 2001)
- March Route of Rochambeau's Army: Reservoir Road – Junction of Reservoir Road and Mount Pleasant Road South (added February 8, 2003)
- Nathan B. Lattin Farm – 22 Walker Hill Road (added June 24, 1990)
- New York Belting and Packing Co. – 45–71 and 79–89 Glen Road (added July 2, 1982)
- Newtown Borough Historic District – Roughly, Main Street from Hawley Road to Academy Lane (added 1996)
- Nichols Satinet Mill Site (added March 23, 1996)
- Sanford–Curtis–Thurber House (added 2007)

== Economy ==
=== Major employers ===
According to the Newtown Connecticut Economic Development Commission, the top employers in the Newtown and Sandy Hook area are:

Town of Newtown – Board of Education
Masonicare at Newtown (Now Newtown Rehabilitation and Healthcare Center owned by Athena)
State Dept. of Corrections at Garner
Taunton Press
Charter Communications
Big Y Supermarket
Town of Newtown
Tier One Manufacturing
Newtown Savings Bank
Curtis Packaging Corp.
Vodafone
Caraluzzi's Newtown Market
Stop & Shop
UConn Health Center (Garner Correctional Facility)
Sonics & Materials, Inc.
Rand – Whitney Corp.
Mediassociates

== Education ==
The Newtown Public Schools district operates four elementary schools (Hawley Elementary School, Head O'Meadow Elementary School, Middle Gate Elementary School, and Sandy Hook Elementary School) serving grades K–4, Reed Intermediate School serving grades 5–6, Newtown Middle School serving grades 7–8, and Newtown High School serving grades 9–12.

Newtown also has several private and parochial schools, including St. Rose of Lima Roman Catholic School, the Fraser-Woods Montessori School, and the Housatonic Valley Waldorf School. In 2010, six educators made the top salary list in Newtown, Connecticut.

== Notable people ==
- Renata Adler (born 1938), author
- John Ball (born 1972), soccer player
- Mary Augustine Barber (1789–1860), educator and Visitandine nun
- William Bayer (born 1939), novelist
- Scott Calabrese (born 1972), soccer player and coach
- Cyrus Beers (1786–1850), U.S. Representative from New York
- Charles Chapman (1799–1869), U.S. Representative from Connecticut
- Suzanne Collins (born 1962), author of the best-selling The Hunger Games book series
- Joanna Cole (1944–2020), author of The Magic School Bus series
- Robert Cottingham (born 1935), photorealist painter
- Hannah Cruz (born 1992), actress
- Bruce Degen (born 1945), illustrator of The Magic School Bus series
- Henry Dutton (1796–1869), former Connecticut governor
- Edward Eliscu (1902–1998), songwriter
- Joseph F. Engelberger (1925–2015), roboticist
- Scott Fellows (born 1965), producer and writer of Ned's Declassified and Big Time Rush
- Sawyer Fredericks (born 1999) folk singer notable for winning NBC's The Voice (American TV series) season 8, born in Newtown and lived there until age 8, when he moved to Fultonville, New York (near Amsterdam)
- Robert Edison Fulton Jr. (1909–2004), inventor and adventurer
- Charles Goodyear (1800–1860), inventor of the vulcanization process
- Willis Nichols Hawley (1875–1898), American soldier; born and raised in Newtown
- Rea Irvin (1881–1972), cartoonist, illustrator, and art editor
- Caitlyn Jenner (born 1949), Olympic athlete
- Elia Kazan (1909–2003), film and stage director
- Steven Kellogg (born 1940), children's author and illustrator, used to live in Sandy Hook, "is believed to have sold house to Anthony Edwards".
- Deen Kemsley, accounting professor and Christian author
- Doug Kenney, humorist (National Lampoon co-creator, Animal House co-writer)
- Chris Licht, CNN President
- Burke Marshall (1922–2003), head of the Civil Rights Division of the U.S. Department of Justice during the Civil Rights Era, retired in Newtown
- Leah McSweeney (born 1982), founder and CEO of the female "Married to the MOB" (MTTM) clothing line
- Daniel Nash Morgan (1844–1931), Treasurer of the United States
- Luzon Buritt Morris (1827–1895), 55th Governor of Connecticut
- Ryan T. Murphy (born 1971), associate director of the Mormon Tabernacle Choir, was a resident and graduate from Newtown High School
- Max Nacewicz (born 1993), professional football player
- Elizur H. Prindle (1829–1890), U.S. Representative from New York
- Mackie Samoskevich (born 2002), professional hockey player
- Francis Cornwall Sherman (1805–1870), served as the 5th and 23rd Mayor of Chicago, between 1841-1842 and 1862-1865.
- Francis Trowbridge Sherman (1825–1905), Union general during the American Civil War
- Jesse Lee Soffer (born 1984), actor, TV series As the World Turns and Chicago P.D.
- Art Spector (1920–1987), Boston Celtics basketball player
- Rick Spencer (singer) (born 1952), American folk singer-songwriter and musical historian
- Joey Styles (born 1971), announcer for Extreme Championship Wrestling and World Wrestling Entertainment
- James Thurber (1894–1961), cartoonist and playwright
- Isaac Toucey (1792–1869), U.S. Senator, Secretary of the Navy, Attorney General of the United States, and Governor of Connecticut, was born in the town
- Marcus Tracy (born 1986), professional soccer player
- Mead Treadwell (born 1956), 13th Lieutenant Governor of Alaska and former Chair of the U.S. Arctic Research Commission
- Walter S. Trumbull (died 1961), sportswriter and columnist
- Cecily Tynan (born 1969), broadcast meteorologist, WPVI TV Action News in Philadelphia, PA
- Louis Untermeyer (1885–1977), American poet, anthologist and critic who lived and later died here
- Jenna von Oÿ (born 1977), actress, TV series Blossom and The Parkers
- Nina Barr Wheeler (1909–1978), artist, muralist
