= Deen Kemsley =

- Citizenship: USA
- Education: University of North Carolina at Chapel Hill
- Known for: Accounting-related instruction, consulting, and public speaking
- Awards: Dean's Teaching Award at Columbia Business School in 1998; Columbia University's Singhvi Teaching Award for Scholarship in the Classroom in 1999; numerous Teacher Honor Roll awards at Tulane University
- Scientific career
- Fields: Accounting, Taxation
- Workplaces: Freeman School of Business

Deen Kemsley is an accounting professor and a Christian author. He earned a PhD in business and economics from the University of North Carolina at Chapel Hill in 1995. He then served on the faculty at Columbia Business School from 1995 to 2004, taking a one-year visit to Yale School of Management in 2003. He now teaches at the A.B. Freeman School of Business at Tulane University. In addition to his academic work, Professor Kemsley is the author of Trust in the Lord: Reflections of Jesus Christ (Sweetwater Books).

MBA students, stock analysts, and bond analysts all know Professor Kemsley for his teaching abilities. He earned the Dean's Teaching Award at Columbia Business School in 1998, Columbia University's Singhvi Teaching Award for Scholarship in the Classroom in 1999, and numerous Teacher Honor Roll awards at Tulane University. On Wall Street, he regularly trains analysts for Morgan Stanley, Lehman Brothers, and other banks.

Business professors know Professor Kemsley for his published research on taxes, accounting, and firm value. He has published several articles in top finance and accounting journals, including the Journal of Finance, the Journal of Accounting Research, and the Accounting Review, among others.

His joint work on taxes, dividends, and debt with Glenn Hubbard (economics), Trevor Harris, and Doron Nissim stirred considerable controversy and has been considered by Congress on several occasions.

Professor Kemsley also is an author who writes for a broad Christian audience regardless of creed or denomination. Several prominent theologians, scholars, business leaders, and media personalities from a variety of different backgrounds and beliefs have endorsed Trust in the Lord: Reflections of Jesus Christ.

Deen and his wife Kristin are the parents of nine children. They live in Abita Springs, Louisiana.

== Books ==
Deen Kemsley is the author of Trust in the Lord: Reflections of Jesus Christ. Many prominent business leaders and others have endorsed his book.
