= Glover House (Newtown, Connecticut) =

Historic house in Connecticut, United States

- U.S. National Register of Historic Places
- U.S. Historic district – Contributing property
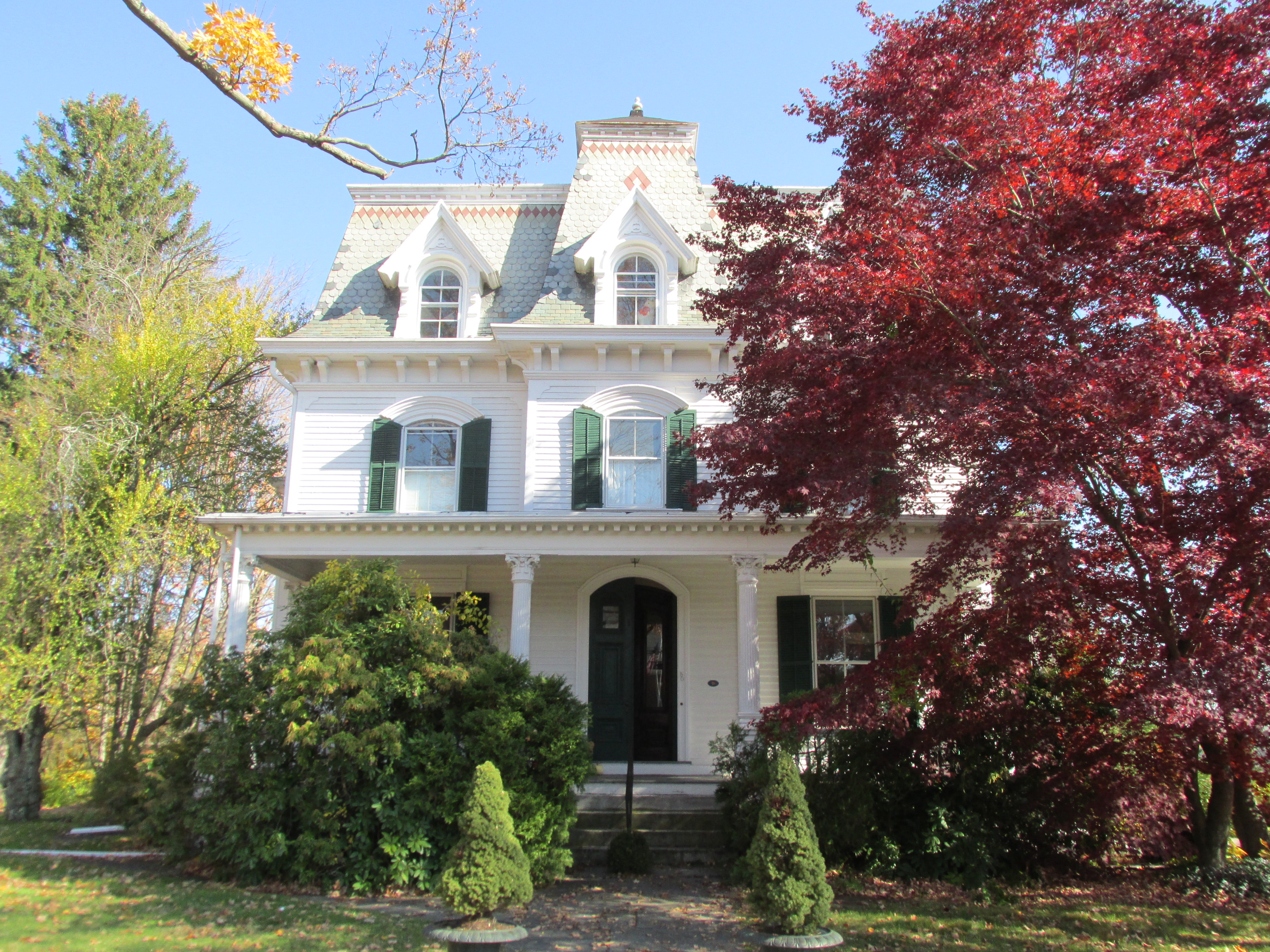

- Location within Connecticut Location within the United States
- Location: 50 Main Street, Newtown, Connecticut
- Coordinates: 41°24′55″N 73°18′36″W
- Area: 1.8 acres (0.73 ha)
- Built: 1869
- Architect: Beers, Silas N.
- Architectural style: Second Empire
- Part of: Newtown Borough Historic District (ID96001458)
- NRHP reference No.: 82004369

Significant dates
- Added to NRHP: February 11, 1982
- Designated CP: December 20, 1996

The Glover House, also known as the Budd House, is a historic house at 50 Main Street in Newtown, Connecticut. Built in 1869, it is a good local example of Second Empire architecture, and is further notable for the long tenancy of a single prominent local family. It was listed on the National Register of Historic Places in 1982.

== Description and history ==
The Glover House stands in Newtown's village center, across Main Street from Edmond Town Hall. It is a three-story wood-frame structure, covered by a mansard roof, with its exterior walls clad in clapboards. The main facade is three bays wide, with a central projecting bay and a full-width single-story porch. The porch is supported by round Corinthian columns, and has a dentillated cornice. Windows are set in segmented-arch openings on the second floor, and the third floor dormer windows are set in round-arch openings under gabled roofs. The interior retains many period features and finishes.

The house was built in 1869 for Henry Beers Glover, and its design has been attributed to Silas Beers, whom Glover knew from service on a church building committee. The house was owned by a succession of Glover descendants (whose later generations were named Budd) until 1977. Henry Beers Glover was one of the town's richest men, a successful businessman and banker. William Beecher, who married one of Glover's daughters, was a local attorney and judge of the probate court. Their daughter, Florence Budd, remained in the house until her death in 1977.

== See also ==
- John Glover House, also NRHP-listed in Newtown
- National Register of Historic Places listings in Fairfield County, Connecticut
