= Freeman School of Business =

Business school of Tulane University

A. B. Freeman School of Business
- Type: Private
- Established: 1914
- Parent institution: Tulane University
- Endowment: $89.7 million
- Dean: C. Edward Fee (interim)
- Faculty: 110
- Students: 3090
- Location: New Orleans, Louisiana, U.S. 29°56′07″N 90°07′22″W
- Campus: Urban
- Website: freeman.tulane.edu

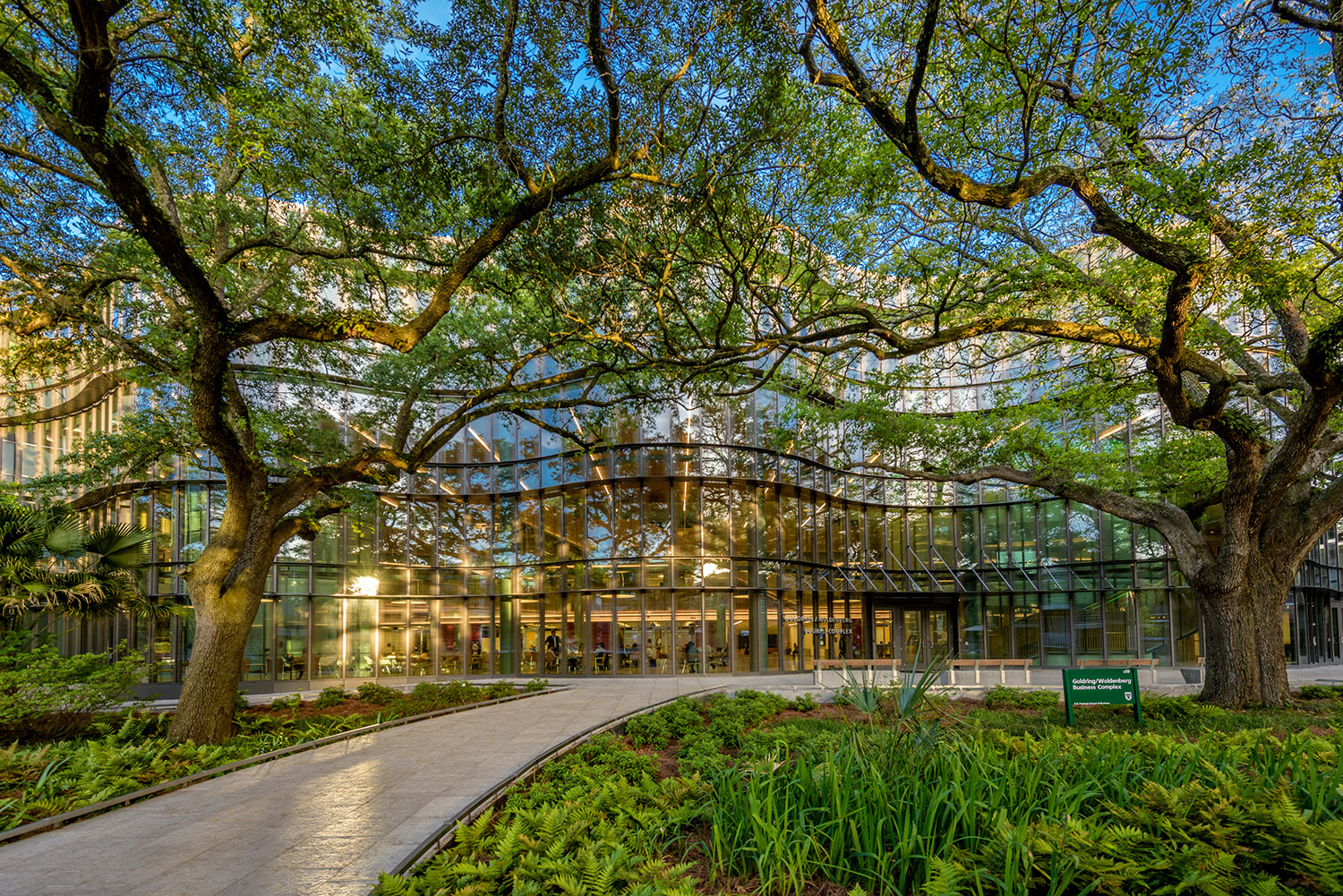
The Goldring/Woldenberg Business Complex has housed the Freeman School since 2018.

The A. B. Freeman School of Business is the business school of Tulane University, a private university in New Orleans, Louisiana, United States.

The Freeman School of Business offers undergraduate programs, a full-time MBA program and other master's programs, a doctoral program, and executive education. It was a charter member of the Association to Advance Collegiate Schools of Business in 1916. The school was named in honor of A. B. Freeman, a former chairman of the Louisiana Coca-Cola Bottling Co. and a prominent New Orleans philanthropist. The school is known in the finance community as the publisher of Burkenroad Reports.

The school's main location, in the center of Tulane's Uptown New Orleans campus, is across a pedestrian thoroughfare (McAlister Place) from the university's student center.

== History ==
In 1914, Tulane University's business school was founded as the College of Commerce and Business Administration. Two years later, the school became one of the fourteen founding members of the American Assembly of Collegiate Schools of Business (AACSB), the nation's leading accrediting body for business schools. In 1940, the school began offering the Master of Business Administration program. The Doctor of Philosophy program began in 1976, the Executive MBA program began in 1983, and the Online MBA began in 2023.

In 1986, the school moved from Norman Mayer Memorial Hall, one of the oldest buildings on Tulane's campus, to Goldring/Woldenberg Hall. In 2018, a renovation and addition was completed, making it the Goldring/Woldenberg Business Complex (GWBC).

== Campus ==
The Freeman School's main building, the Goldring/Woldenberg Business Complex, sits in the center of Tulane's Uptown New Orleans campus, which is located on St. Charles Avenue, across from Audubon Park. The GWBC houses the undergraduate and graduate business programs and features advanced hardware and software equipped with industry-leading simulation, and financial applications.

In 2019, the Freeman School opened the Stewart Center CBD, a new facility in downtown New Orleans, for executive and international programs.

In 2025, a $20 million fund to invest in startups founded by alumni and faculty was launched in partnership with 1834 Ventures.

== Academic programs ==
=== Degrees ===
The school offers a Bachelor of Science in Management degree, as well as numerous graduate degrees, including the Master of Business Administration (MBA), Master of Accounting (MACCT), Master of Business Analytics (MANA), Master of Finance (MFIN), Master of Management (MMG), and Master of Management in Energy (MME).

=== Double-degree programs ===
Double-degree offerings include, but are not limited to, the BSM/Master of Accounting, BSM/MBA, MBA/MME (Master of Management in Energy), MBA/Master of Sustainable Real Estate Development, MBA/MD, MBA/JD (Law), and MBA/MHA (Health Administration).

== Signature programs ==
=== Burkenroad Reports ===
Burkenroad Reports provides stock analyses of small- to mid-size companies throughout the Texas to Florida region of the United States. Many of these companies would otherwise not be covered by bulge bracket financial firms; consequently, the reports provide unique information that investors rely on, which helps the followed companies gain access to capital. Students are the primary authors of the reports, and they get the opportunity to visit the followed companies and interview top management. This process allows students to gain practical and marketable stock analysis skills, as well as insight into strategic management. The Burkenroad Reports program celebrated its 25th year in 2018.

=== Darwin Fenner Student Managed Fund ===
In the Darwin Fenner Student Managed Fund course, students actively manage more than $5.8 million of Tulane University's endowment in three separate equity portfolios – and regularly beat the benchmark indexes. Students are empowered to manage real risk with real money by studying academic research and learning methods for analyzing stocks while managing a mid-cap or a small-cap portfolio. Students utilize the software and databases used by professional fund managers, including Bloomberg Terminals, ThomsonOne.com, Standard & Poor's Net Advantage, and Standard & Poor's Capital IQ.

=== Aaron Selber, Jr. Courses on Distressed Debt and Hedge Funds ===
In the Selber courses, students dedicate an entire semester to learning about distressed debt (each spring) or hedge funds (each fall). Students can apply to take one or both courses, which complement topics in the traditional long-only equity or investment grade bond world.

=== Trading room ===
The Freeman School's trading room.

The Freeman School's trading room has ninety-eight flat-screen computer monitors, televisions to provide news coverage, and a stock ticker monitor. All the desks have access to Bloomberg and Reuters financial databases. The trading room is meant to resemble spaces that can be found usually at banks and brokerage houses.

== Rankings ==
Business school rankings

United States
- Bloomberg MBA: 66
- USNWR MBA: 81

Several news publications, including the Financial Times, Forbes, América Economía and the U.S. News & World Report, regularly rank the Freeman School among the top 50 business schools in the nation. Individually, the Finance department has been ranked among the top 10 in the world by the Financial Times on several occasions. Also, Entrepreneur Magazine has consistently ranked Freeman among the top 20 schools for entrepreneurship.

The Entrepreneur Magazine has ranked the Freeman School among the top twenty schools for entrepreneurship, giving the school a ranking of No. 4 in 2009. In 2018, the Freeman School's MBA program was ranked 46th in the nation by Bloomberg Businessweek and the undergraduate program was ranked 44th by U.S. News & World Report.

In 2013, Tulane University reported that admissions figures for the business school had been falsified from 2007 to 2011, including increasing the average GMAT scores of students and the number of completed applications.

== Current faculty ==
- Deen Kemsley, bulge-bracket accounting consultant
- Peter Ricchiuti, founder of Burkenroad Reports, former state chief investment officer

== Notable alumni ==
- C.W. Lemoine Author and Air Force aviator.
- Ricardo Salinas Pliego, MBA 1979, Mexican businessman, CEO of Grupo Elektra, 154th wealthiest person in the world in 2008 (worth $6.3 billion)
- Regina Benjamin, MBA 1991, former Surgeon General of the United States
- Andrew Friedman, BSM (Finance) 1999, became General Manager of the Tampa Bay Rays at age 28
- Dominik Knoll, M.B.A., CEO of World Trade Center New Orleans
- Sammis Reyes (2018), business management graduate and sportsperson who later became the first Chilean to play in the NFL
- Eleni M. Roumel, MBA 2000, Judge, United States Court of Federal Claims
- William A. Goldring (BBA ’64), Chairman, Sazerac Company, Inc.

== See also ==
- List of business schools in the United States
- List of United States business school rankings
- Tulane Corporate Law Institute
