= Newtown (borough), Connecticut =

Newtown, Connecticut
- Borough
- Borough of Newtown
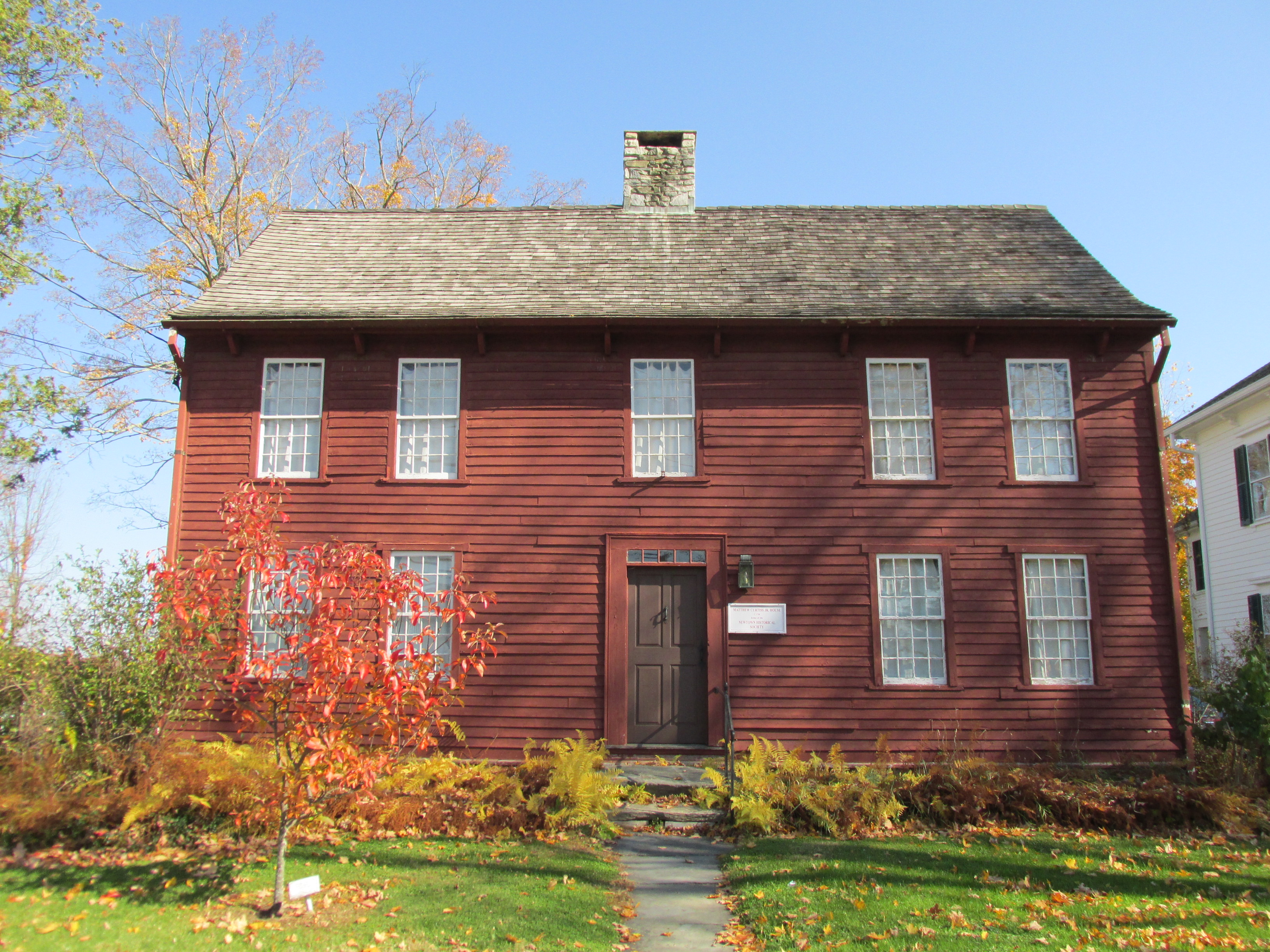
- Home of the Newtown Historical Society

- Location within the Western Connecticut Planning Region and the state of Connecticut
- Coordinates: 41.412°N 73.312°W
- Country: United States
- U.S. state: Connecticut
- County: Fairfield
- Region: Western CT
- Town: Newtown

Area
  - Total: 2.3 sq mi (6.0 km^{2})

Population (2020)
  - Total: 1,914
  - Density: 830.7/sq mi (320.7/km^{2})
- ZIP code: 06470
- Area codes: 203/475
- FIPS code: 09-52910
- Website: https://boroughofnewtownct.gov/

Newtown is a borough in Fairfield County, Connecticut, United States, within the town of Newtown. The population was 1,914 at the 2020 census.

== History ==
=== Newtown Borough Historic District ===
A small part of the borough was designated as a historic district on the National Register of Historic Places (NRHP) in 1996. The district area has buildings dating back from 1780. The district includes the separately NRHP-listed Glover House.

In 1996, the district included 225 contributing buildings, two other contributing structures, one contributing site and two contributing objects over a 100 acres (40 ha) area.

The one contributing site in the district is the "Ram's Pasture", a meadow that was common land.

== Geography ==
According to the United States Census Bureau, the borough has a total area of 2.3 square miles (6.0 km^{2}), all land.

== Government ==
The Borough of Newtown occupies about 1,475 acres (5.97 km^{2}) (or roughly two square miles) in the central part of town. Incorporated in 1824 by an act of the Connecticut General Assembly, it is one of only nine remaining boroughs in the state. The borough adopted zoning for the town center long before the rest of the community. The lot sizes are smaller than the minimum 1-acre (4,000 m^{2}) lots of the rest of the community. The borough also has running public water provided by a small town water company. Much of the borough is sewered, whereas most of the rest of the town has wells and septic systems.

== Demographics ==
As of the census of 2000, there were 1,843 people, 649 households, and 514 families residing in the borough. The population density was 796.7 inhabitants per square mile (307.6/km^{2}). There were 668 housing units at an average density of 288.8 per square mile (111.5/km^{2}). The racial makeup of the borough was 95.98% White, 0.38% Black or African American, 2.17% Asian, 0.05% Pacific Islander, 0.49% from other races, and 0.92% from two or more races. Hispanic or Latino of any race were 2.12% of the population.

There were 649 households, out of which 39.9% had children under the age of 18 living with them, 69.2% were married couples living together, 7.4% had a female householder with no husband present, and 20.8% were non-families. 16.3% of all households were made up of individuals, and 7.4% had someone living alone who was 65 years of age or older. The average household size was 2.84 and the average family size was 3.20.

In the borough the population was spread out, with 29.1% under the age of 18, 3.5% from 18 to 24, 29.7% from 25 to 44, 25.2% from 45 to 64, and 12.5% who were 65 years of age or older. The median age was 39 years. For every 100 females, there were 92.8 males. For every 100 females age 18 and over, there were 92.3 males.

The median income for a household in the borough was $86,553, and the median income for a family was $99,835. Males had a median income of $68,516 versus $41,625 for females. The per capita income for the borough was $36,030. About 1.5% of families and 1.8% of the population were below the poverty line, including 1.1% of those under age 18 and 7.5% of those age 65 or over.
