= Connecticut Route 2 =

State highway in Hartford and New London counties in Connecticut, United States

Route 2
- Route 2 highlighted in red

Route information
- Maintained by CTDOT
- Length: 58.03 mi (93.39 km)
- Existed: 1932–present

Major junctions
- West end: Columbus Boulevard / State Street in Hartford
- I-84 / US 6 in East Hartford; Route 3 in Glastonbury; Route 17 in Glastonbury; Route 11 in Colchester; I-395 / Route 2A in Norwich; Route 214 in Ledyard; I-95 in North Stonington; Route 78 in Stonington
- East end: US 1 in Stonington

Location
- Country: United States
- State: Connecticut
- Counties: Hartford; New London

Highway system
- Connecticut State Highway System; Interstate; US; State; SSR; SR; Scenic
| ← US 1A | → Route 2A |
| ← Route 16 | N.E. | → Route 18 |

Route 2 is a 58.03-mile (93.39 km) state highway in Hartford and New London counties in Connecticut. It is a primary state route, with a freeway section connecting Hartford to Norwich and following surface roads to Stonington. The entire freeway section of Route 2 west of Route 169 is also known as the Veterans of Foreign Wars Memorial Highway Though it is labelled an east-west highway, it follows a northwest-southeast route, with large sections of the highway running north-south throughout its duration.

== Route description ==
Route 2 begins as a continuation of State Street (just east of Columbus Boulevard) near Interstate 91 in downtown Hartford. It starts out heading east toward East Hartford. Route 2 then crosses the Connecticut River on the Founders Bridge and has a partial interchange with I-91 at the crossing. Immediately after crossing into East Hartford, there is a complex interchange with Interstate 84. Immediately after this interchange, Route 2 heads southeast in the direction of Glastonbury. There is a partial interchange with Route 15 about 0.75 miles (1.21 km) further. After East Hartford, Route 2 enters Glastonbury. At the East Hartford-Glastonbury town line, there is a full trumpet interchange with Route 3. About 1 mile (1.6 km) after this interchange, there is a partial interchange with Route 17. From Glastonbury, Route 2 passes into Marlborough. It continues into Colchester. In Colchester, Route 2 has a partial interchange with Route 11. After this interchange, Route 2 curves and heads east toward Norwich. Once Route 2 leaves Colchester, it passes through the towns of Lebanon and Bozrah. After Bozrah, Route 2 enters Norwich. Just after entering Norwich, Route 32 joins Route 2. Then, about 1.5 miles (2.4 km) down Route 2, there is a partial cloverleaf interchange with Interstate 395. About 1.75 miles (2.82 km) further east from the I-395 interchange, the freeway section of Route 2 ends at a four-way at-grade intersection with Town Street, Harland Road (Route 169), and Washington Street (Route 32/Route 2). Route 32 then separates in downtown Norwich after overlapping with Route 2 for 3.9 miles (6.3 km), following the west bank of the Thames River. Route 2 continues southeast from Norwich into Preston, and then into Ledyard. Just after entering Ledyard, Route 2 becomes a four-lane undivided freeway, passing by the Mashantucket Pequot Reservation and then the Foxwoods Resort Casino. After passing through Ledyard, Route 2 continues into North Stonington as a two-lane surface road. There is a roundabout with Route 184 and a partial interchange with Interstate 95 here. After leaving North Stonington, Route 2 heads into Stonington. Here, Route 2 is reduced to a minor arterial road. It has an interchange with Route 78 (Westerly Bypass) and terminates about 1.5 miles (2.4 km) later at the junction with US 1 in the Pawcatuck section of town just west of the Rhode Island state line.

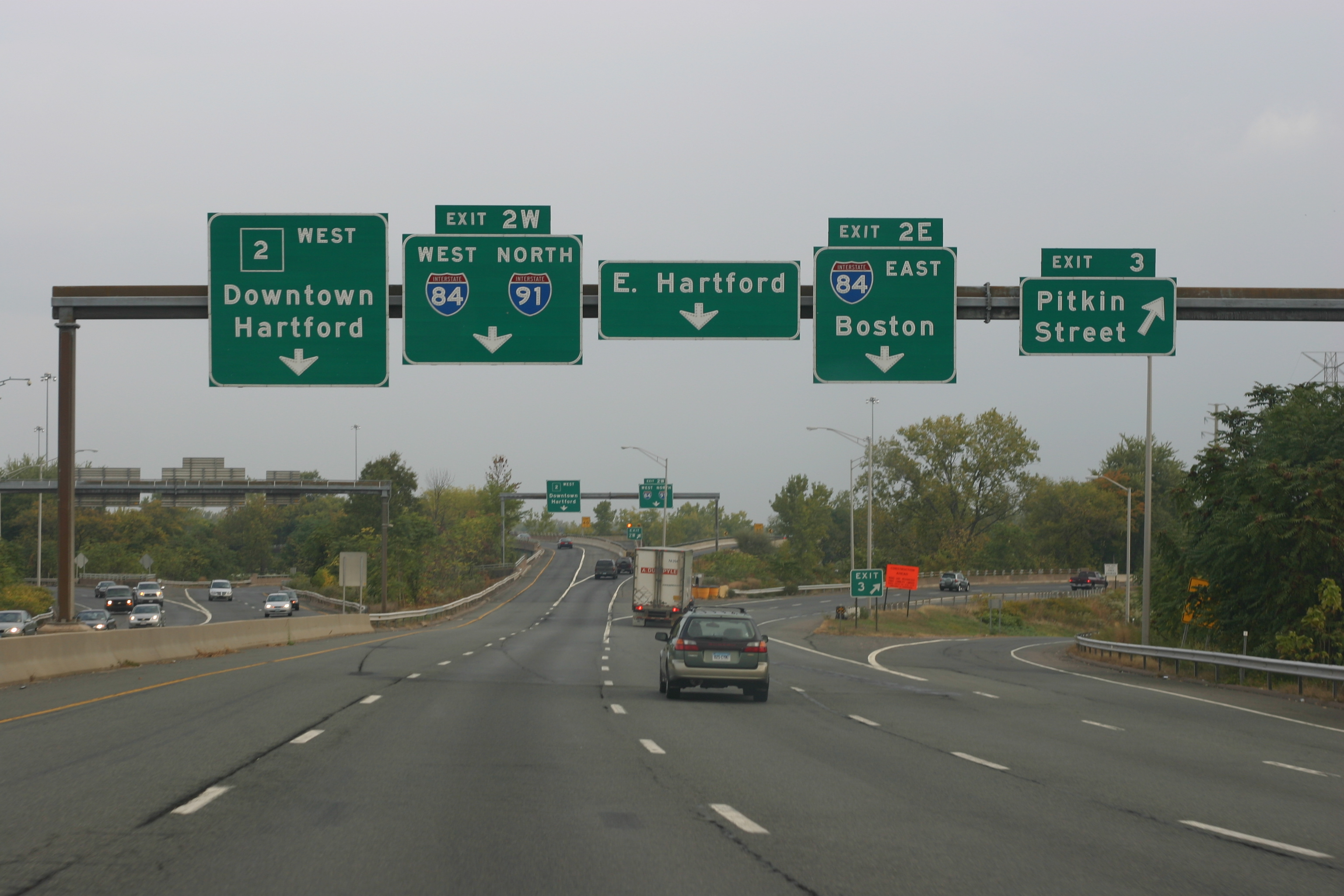
Route 2 westbound in Hartford, just before exits 2E, 2W and 3.

Several Connecticut freeways terminate at Route 2. Route 3 ends at Route 2 near the East Hartford-Glastonbury town line, Route 17 ends at Route 2 in Glastonbury, and Route 11 ends at Route 2 in Colchester. Route 78 also ends at Route 2, in Stonington. It is unusual that Route 78 intersects Route 2 where it is not a freeway.

== History ==
Two early toll roads, the Hartford and New London Turnpike and the Colchester and Norwich Turnpike, followed the alignment of current Route 2 in the 1800s. In 1922, The New England Interstate system incorporated the future Route 2 alignment as Route 17. Upon the discontinuation of the New England routes in the 1932 state highway renumbering, the eastern half of old New England Route 17 was renumbered to Route 2. The western half of old New England Route 17 eventually formed part of U.S. Route 44.

Freeway construction along the Route 2 alignment started in the 1950s and continued through the 1960s and early 1970s. The oldest freeway segment, between exits 2 and 5, opened in 1952; the latest segment, between exits 25 and 30, opened in 1971. The state still maintains some segments of the older, access highway alignment, but does not sign these segments as state routes. The state remanded the remaining access highway segments to town jurisdiction.

== Junction list ==
Exit numbers were converted from sequential to mile-based numbering in 2025.

| County | Location | mi | km | Old exit | New exit | Destinations | Notes |
|---|---|---|---|---|---|---|---|
| Hartford | Hartford | 0.00 | 0.00 | – | – | Columbus Boulevard / State Street – Convention Center, Science Center | Western terminus; at-grade intersection |
| Hartford | Hartford | 0.03 | 0.048 | – | – | I-91 south – New Haven | Eastbound exit and westbound entrance; exit 38D on I-91 |
| Hartford | Connecticut River | 0.03– 0.88 | 0.048– 1.42 | Founders Bridge | | | |
| Hartford | East Hartford | 0.46– 0.98 | 0.74– 1.58 | 3 | 1A | Pitkin Street | westbound exit and eastbound entrance |
| Hartford | East Hartford | 0.46– 0.98 | 0.74– 1.58 | 2 | 1C | I-84 (US 6) / I-91 north – Hartford, Springfield, East Hartford, Boston | Signed as exits 1B (I-84 west) and 1C (I-84 east) westbound; access to East Hartford via SR 500; no eastbound access to I-84 west |
| Hartford | East Hartford | 1.35 | 2.17 | 4 | 1D | East River Drive / US 5 / Route 15 to I-91 south – New Haven | Westbound exit and eastbound entrance; access via (SR 502 east) |
| Hartford | East Hartford | 1.80 | 2.90 | 5 | 2A | Riverside Drive / Willow Street (SR 516 east) | Eastbound exit and westbound entrance |
| Hartford | East Hartford | 2.80 | 4.51 | 5A | 2B | High Street | No westbound exit |
| Hartford | East Hartford | 3.04 | 4.89 | 5A | 2 | Main Street (SR 517 north) | Westbound exit only |
| Hartford | East Hartford | 3.27 | 5.26 | 5B | – | Sutton Avenue | Eastbound exit and westbound entrance; permanently closed in January 2022 |
| Hartford | East Hartford | 3.67 | 5.91 | 5C | 3 | Maple Street | No westbound exit |
| Hartford | Glastonbury | 4.41 | 7.10 | 5D | 4A | Route 3 south – Glastonbury, Wethersfield | Northern terminus and exits 13B and 13C on Route 3; signed as exit 4 westbound |
| Hartford | Glastonbury | 4.70 | 7.56 | 6 | 4B | Griswold Street – Glastonbury | Eastbound exit and westbound entrance |
| Hartford | Glastonbury | 5.07 | 8.16 | 7 | 5 | Route 17 south – Portland, South Glastonbury | Eastbound exit and westbound entrance; northern terminus of Route 17 |
| Hartford | Glastonbury | 5.31– 6.01 | 8.55– 9.67 | 8 | 6 | Route 94 east (Hebron Avenue) – Glastonbury Center | Western terminus of Route 94 |
| Hartford | Glastonbury | 7.12 | 11.46 | 9 | 7 | Neipsic Road – Glastonbury | Eastbound exit and westbound entrance |
| Hartford | Glastonbury | 9.94 | 16.00 | – | 10 | Route 83 north – East Glastonbury, Manchester | Southern terminus of Route 83 |
| Hartford | Glastonbury | 11.56 | 18.60 | – | 11 | Thompson Street / Wassuc Road – Glastonbury | Westbound exit and eastbound entrance |
| Hartford | Marlborough | 13.42 | 21.60 | 12 | 13 | West Road / Portland Road – Marlborough | Eastbound exit and westbound entrance |
| Hartford | Marlborough | 15.44 | 24.85 | 13 | 15 | Route 66 – Willimantic, Middletown | |
| Hartford | Marlborough | 17.66 | 28.42 | 15 | 17 | South Main Street – Marlborough | Westbound exit and eastbound entrance |
| New London | Colchester | 20.38 | 32.80 | 16 | 20 | Route 149 south (Westchester Road) – Westchester, Moodus | Northern terminus of Route 149 |
| New London | Colchester | 22.37 | 36.00 | 17 | 22 | Business Route (SR 615 east) – Colchester | Eastbound exit and westbound entrance. Access to SR 615 via Mill Hill Road. |
| New London | Colchester | 23.70 | 38.14 | 18 | 23 | Route 16 – East Haddam, Colchester | |
| New London | Colchester | 24.35 | 39.19 | 19 | 24 | Route 11 south – New London | Eastbound exit and westbound entrance; northern terminus of Route 11 |
| New London | Colchester | 25.05 | 40.31 | 20 | 25 | Route 354 (Parum Road) to Route 85 – Salem, New London | Westbound exit and eastbound entrance; access to Route 85 via SR 637 |
| New London | Colchester | 26.03 | 41.89 | 21 | 26 | Norwich Avenue – Colchester | Eastbound exit and entrance. Access to Norwich Avenue via Chestnut Hill Road |
| New London | Colchester | 26.47 | 42.60 | 21 | 26 | Norwich Avenue (SR 616) | Westbound exit and entrance |
| New London | Lebanon | 30.91 | 49.74 | 22 | 30 | Scott Hill Road – Gilman, Lebanon | |
| New London | Bozrah | 33.32 | 53.62 | 23 | 33 | Route 163 south / Haughton Road (SR 612 north) – Bozrah, Montville | Northern terminus of Route 163 |
| New London | Bozrah | 34.54 | 55.59 | 24 | 34 | Fitchville Road (SR 608) – Fitchville | Westbound exit and eastbound entrance |
| New London | Norwich | 35.62 | 57.32 | 25 | 35A | Route 32 north – Franklin, Willimantic | Western end of Route 32 concurrency; signed as exit 35 eastbound |
| New London | Norwich | 36.33 | 58.47 | 27 | 35B | Otrobando Avenue (SR 642) – Yantic | Westbound exit and entrance |
| New London | Norwich | 37.00 | 59.55 | 28 | 36-37 | I-395 / Route 2A east – New Haven, Worcester | Signed as exits 36 (I-395 south) and 37 (I-395 north); no westbound access to I-395 north; exits 13A and 13B on I-395; western terminus of Route 2A; former Route 52 |
| New London | Norwich | 37.71 | 60.69 | 29 | 38 | New London Turnpike – Norwichtown | |
| New London | Norwich | 38.15 | 61.40 | Eastern end of freeway section | | | |
| New London | Norwich | 38.15 | 61.40 | | | Route 169 north (Harland Road) – Taftville | Southern terminus of Route 169 |
| New London | Norwich | 39.52 | 63.60 | | | Route 32 south / Route 82 west – New London, Salem | Eastern end of Route 32 concurrency; eastern terminus of Route 82 |
| New London | Norwich | 39.88 | 64.18 | | | Route 12 south (Laurel Hill Avenue) – Groton | Western end of Route 12 concurrency |
| New London | Norwich | 40.19 | 64.68 | | | Route 12 north (North Main Street) | Eastern end of Route 12 concurrency |
| New London | Norwich | 40.52 | 65.21 | | | Route 165 east – Preston | Western terminus of Route 165 |
| New London | Preston | 42.95 | 69.12 | | | Route 2A west / Route 117 south to I-95 – Ledyard, Poquetanuck | Eastern terminus of Route 2A; northern terminus of Route 117 |
| New London | Preston | 45.70 | 73.55 | | | Route 164 north – Preston City | Southern terminus of Route 164 |
| New London | Ledyard | | | Western end of freeway section | | | |
| New London | Ledyard | 47.27 | 76.07 | – | — | Foxwoods Boulevard (SR 680 east) / Fox Tower Drive / Lake of Isles Drive | |
| New London | Ledyard | 48.20 | 77.57 | – | — | Route 214 west / Foxwoods Boulevard (SR 680 west) – Ledyard Center | Eastern terminus of Route 214 |
| New London | North Stonington | | | Eastern end of freeway section | | | |
| New London | North Stonington | 50.33 | 81.00 | | | Route 201 north – Ashwillet, Glasgo | Western end of Route 201 concurrency |
| New London | North Stonington | 51.11 | 82.25 | | | Route 201 south – Stonington | Eastern end of Route 201 concurrency |
| New London | North Stonington | 54.29 | 87.37 | | | Route 184 – Old Mystic, Groton, Providence | Roundabout |
| New London | North Stonington | 55.24 | 88.90 | | | I-95 south – New London To I-95 north – Providence | Exit 108 on I-95; access to I-95 north via SR 617 |
| New London | Stonington | 56.01 | 90.14 | | | Route 49 north – Sterling, Voluntown | Southern terminus of Route 49 |
| New London | Stonington | 56.67 | 91.20 | | | Route 78 east – Westerly, Rhode Island Beaches | Western terminus of Route 78 |
| New London | Stonington | 58.03 | 93.39 | | | US 1 – Mystic, Stonington, Westerly, RI | Eastern terminus |
1.000 mi = 1.609 km; 1.000 km = 0.621 mi: Concurrency terminus; Incomplete access

== See also ==
- List of state highways in Connecticut
- List of highways numbered 2
