= Connecticut Route 117 =

State highway in New London County, Connecticut, US

Route 117
- Map of New London County in southeastern Connecticut with Route 117 highlighted in red

Route information
- Maintained by CTDOT
- Length: 11.32 mi (18.22 km)
- Existed: 1963–present

Major junctions
- South end: US 1 in Groton
- I-95 in Groton
- North end: Route 2 in Preston

Location
- Country: United States
- State: Connecticut
- Counties: New London

Highway system
- Connecticut State Highway System; Interstate; US; State; SSR; SR; Scenic
← Route 116	→ Route 118

Route 117 is a state highway in southeastern Connecticut, running from Groton to Preston. Route 117 is designated the Colonel Ledyard Highway from its intersection with Route 184 in Groton to the Ledyard-Preston town line.

== Route description ==
Route 117 begins at an intersection with US 1 in the village of Poquonnock Bridge in Groton. It starts out as Newtown Road then changes to North Road. About a mile north of US 1, Route 117 has an interchange with I-95 (Exit 88), then continues northward towards the village of Center Groton, where it meets Route 184. There is also access to the Star Plaza shopping area near this junction. Route 117 then enters the town of Ledyard as Center Groton Road. It intersects with Route 214 in Ledyard Center then continues north for another 3.2 miles (5.1 km) until the town line with Preston. In Preston, the road becomes known as Hallville-Poquetanuck Road. Just north of the town line it meets Route 2A which joins Route 117 as they head north towards Route 2 in the village of Hallville. Immediately after crossing Indiantown Brook, Routes 117 and 2A end at Route 2.

== History ==
Since the 1930s, the road between Center Groton and Ledyard center was an unsigned state road known as SR 588. In 1959, SR 588 was extended north using the Colonel Ledyard Highway to the village of Poquetanuck. Route 117 was established in 1963 as part of the 1962 Route Reclassification Act as a redesignation of old SR 588. One year later, the Route 117 designation was extended south to US 1 using a newly constructed extension of North Road. A portion of the current route in Ledyard used to be an old alignment of Route 27.

== Junction list ==
The entire route is in New London County.

Location	mi	km	Destinations	Notes
Groton	0.00	0.00	US 1 – West Mystic, Groton	Southern terminus
Groton	1.07	1.72	I-95 – Providence, New London	Exit 97 on I-95
Groton	2.56	4.12	Route 184 – Groton, Old Mystic	
Ledyard	7.12	11.46	Route 214 – Ledyard, Gales Ferry	
Preston	10.45	16.82	Route 2A west – Uncasville	Southern end of Route 2A concurrency
Preston	11.32	18.22	Route 2 – Norwich, Stonington Route 2A ends	Northern terminus; eastern terminus of Route 2A
1.000 mi = 1.609 km; 1.000 km = 0.621 mi: Concurrency terminus
