= Connecticut Route 138 =

State highway in New London County, Connecticut, US

Route 138
- Map of New London County in southeastern Connecticut with Route 138 highlighted in red

Route information
- Maintained by CTDOT
- Length: 17.73 mi (28.53 km)
- Existed: 1932–present

Major junctions
- West end: Route 97 in Sprague
- I-395 in Griswold
- East end: Route 138 at the Rhode Island state line

Location
- Country: United States
- State: Connecticut
- Counties: New London

Highway system
- Connecticut State Highway System; Interstate; US; State; SSR; SR; Scenic
← Route 137	→ Route 139

Connecticut Route 138 is the portion of the 118-mile-long (190 km) multi-state Route 138 within the state of Connecticut. It is one of several New England state highways that travel through three states while keeping their number designation. The route begins in Sprague at Route 97. From its western terminus up to the junction with Interstate 395 in Griswold, the road functions as a collector road. From the Interstate 395 junction, it then enters Voluntown before ending at the Rhode Island state line, where it continues as Rhode Island Route 138.

== Route description ==
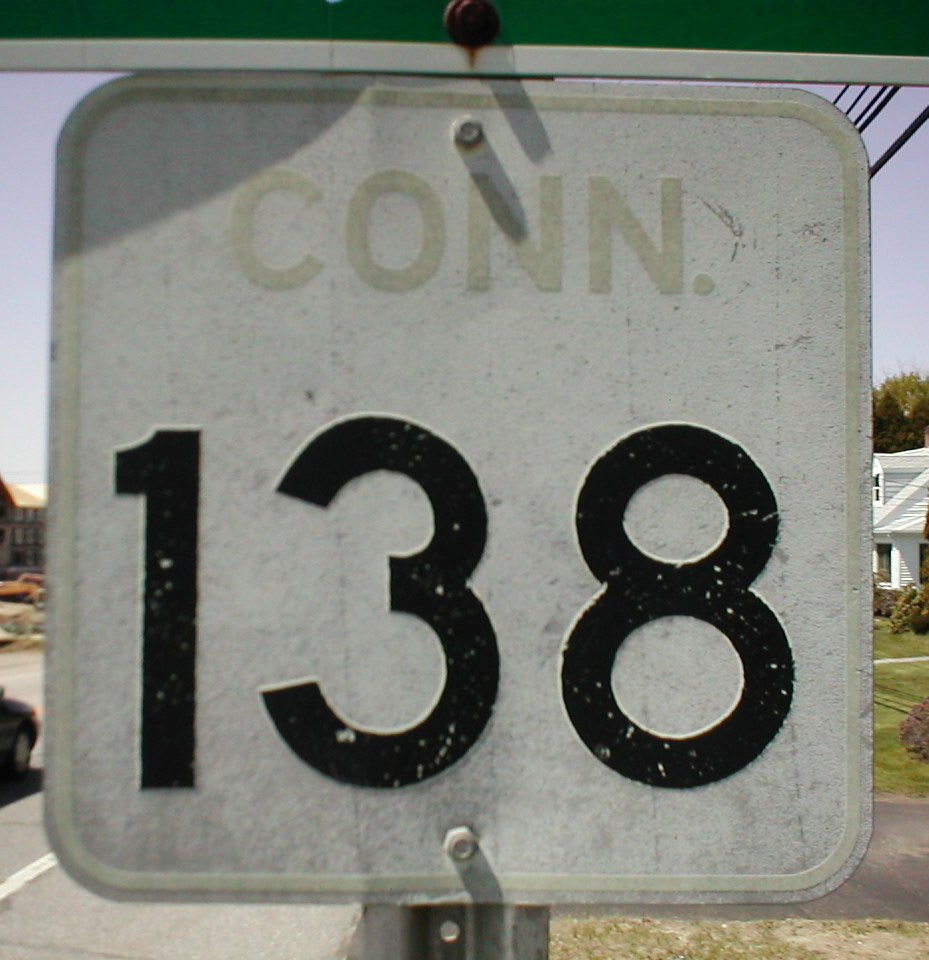
Old shield near Jewett City

Route 138 starts at Route 97, in the town of Sprague, where it is known as Bushnell Hollow Road. It heads east into the town of Lisbon becoming Kinsman Road and Town House Road. It intersects with Route 169 in Lisbon center and then becomes Newent Road, as it proceeds eastward. Route 138 overlaps with Route 12 as it crosses the Griswold town line. Route 138 splits off from Route 12 as Slater Avenue and later as Pachaug Road. It has an interchange with I-395 in the borough of Jewett City and intersects with Route 201 just west of the town line. The road continues into the town of Voluntown, where it becomes Jewett City Road. It has a three-way overlap with Route 165 and Route 49, along Beach Pond Road. Route 138 continues east as Rockville Road into the state of Rhode Island, becoming Rhode Island Route 138.

== History ==
In the 1920s, a loop route of New England Route 12 from south of Taftville to Jewett City via the village of Newent was a secondary state highway known as Highway 356. At the same time, the road connecting Jewett City and the town center of Voluntown was known as Highway 321. In the 1932 state highway renumbering, Route 138 was established from the piece of old Highway 356 from Newent to Jewett City and from the entire length of old Highway 321. Route 138 was extended to the Rhode Island state line in 1938 along former SR 420, where it connected with the westward extension of Rhode Island Route 138, which had originally ended in Newport. This resulted in a three-state Route 138 all the way to the Boston area. Route 138 in Connecticut was extended west to its current western terminus located at Route 97 in 1962 as part of the Route Reclassification Act.

== Junction list ==
The entire route is in New London County.

Location	mi	km	Destinations	Notes
Sprague	0.00	0.00	Route 97 to Route 207 – Baltic, North Franklin, Scotland	Western terminus
Lisbon	2.59	4.17	Paper Mill Road (SR 660 south)	
Lisbon	3.11	5.01	Kinsman Hill Road (SR 600 east)	
Lisbon	4.05	6.52	Route 169 – Canterbury, Norwich, Taftville	
Lisbon	5.78	9.30	Route 12 south – Norwich	Western end of Route 12 concurrency
Griswold	6.17	9.93	Route 12 north – Plainfield, Hopeville	Eastern end of Route 12 concurrency
Griswold	6.91	11.12	Route 164 south – Preston City	Northern terminus of Route 164
Griswold	7.24	11.65	To I-395 south – Norwich I-395 north – Worcester	Exit 22 on I-395; access to I-395 south via SR 629
Griswold	11.16	17.96	Route 201 – Glasgo, Hopeville Pond State Park	
Voluntown	13.33	21.45	Route 49 south / Route 165 west – Preston City, Norwich, Westerly, RI	Western end of Route 49/Route 165 concurrency
Voluntown	13.72	22.08	Route 49 north – Oneco	Eastern end of Route 49 concurrency
Voluntown	14.82	23.85	Route 165 east – Providence, RI	Eastern end of Route 165 concurrency
Voluntown	17.73	28.53	Route 138 east – Hope Valley, Rockville	Continuation into Rhode Island
1.000 mi = 1.609 km; 1.000 km = 0.621 mi: Concurrency terminus
