= Connecticut Route 49 =

State highway in southeast Connecticut, US

Route 49
- Map of eastern Connecticut with Route 49 highlighted in red

Route information
- Maintained by CTDOT
- Length: 21.74 mi (34.99 km)
- Existed: 1932 (as Route 95) (renumbered 1958)–present

Major junctions
- South end: Route 2 in Stonington
- I-95 in North Stonington
- North end: Route 14A in Sterling

Location
- Country: United States
- State: Connecticut
- Counties: New London, Windham

Highway system
- Connecticut State Highway System; Interstate; US; State; SSR; SR; Scenic
← Route 47	→ Route 52

Route 49 is a Connecticut state highway from Route 2 in Stonington to Route 14A in Sterling, in the southeast part of the state. It is a scenic route that runs 21.74 miles (34.99 km) through the Pachaug State Forest.

== Route description ==
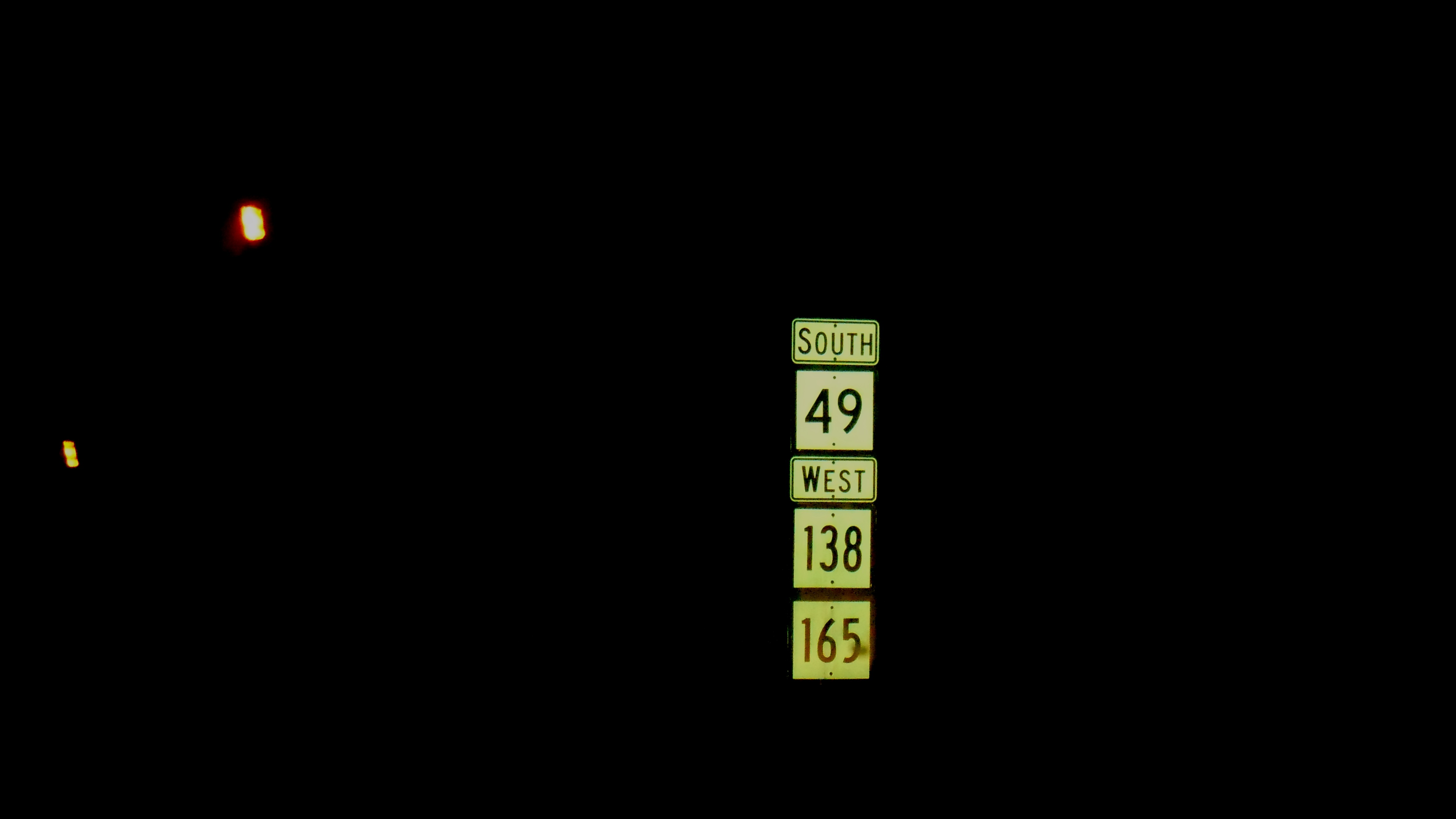
CT 49 overlapping Route 138 and Route 165 in Voluntown.

Route 49 begins as North Street at an intersection with Route 2 in the northeastern corner of the town of Stonington. It proceeds north into the town of North Stonington as Pendleton Hill Road, intersecting with Interstate 95 and Route 184. Route 49 continues north, soon intersecting Route 216. As it enters the town of Voluntown, Route 49 then becomes Westerly Road, while still on a northward track. Route 49 briefly overlaps with Route 165 and Route 138 within the town center. North of the overlap, Route 49 continues as Ekonk Hill Road, crossing the Pachaug River and running through the Pachaug State Forest, before reaching its end at Route 14A in the Sterling Hill Historic District of the town of Sterling.

Route 49 is designated as a scenic road from Route 184 (milepost 2.09) in North Stonington to milepost 12.95 (south of Route 165) in Voluntown and from the Voluntown boat launch (milepost 13.84) to the northern terminus in Sterling.

== History ==
In the 1920s, the road from the northeast corner of Stonington (at New England Route 17) heading north through North Stonington and Voluntown to the Sterling Hill section of Sterling was designated as State Highway 216. In the 1932 state highway renumbering, State Highway 216 was renumbered to Route 95. In 1950, Route 95 was extended east along modern Route 14A up to the Rhode Island state line. In 1958, Interstate 95 was formally designated in Connecticut, and Route 95 was in need of a new designation due to the numbering conflict. The new designation chosen was Route 49. In 1963, as a result of the Route Reclassification Act, Route 14A was created and the north end of Route 49 was relocated to its current terminus.

In early 2003, work on Route 49 and Route 14A Corridor Management Plan was started, funded by the FHWA and ConnDOT. The concerns are speed along Route 49, stone walls, and the surrounding scenery. Since state budget constraints preclude adding more police, one idea was to repaint the fog line so that the lanes are 11 feet (3.4 m) wide. In October 2003, the state turned down a North Stonington request to lower the speed limit from 45 mph (72 km/h) to 35 and 30 mph (48 km/h).

== Junction list ==
County	Location	mi	km	Destinations	Notes
New London	Stonington	0.00	0.00	Route 2 – Pawcatuck, North Stonington	Southern terminus
New London	North Stonington	1.25	2.01	I-95 north – Providence To I-95 south – New London	Exit 108 on I-95; access to I-95 south via SR 617
New London	North Stonington	2.09	3.36	Route 184 – Clarks Falls, Old Mystic	
New London	North Stonington	4.13	6.65	Route 216 south – Clarks Falls, Ashaway	Northern terminus of Route 216
New London	Voluntown	13.05	21.00	Route 165 west – Preston City, Norwich	Southern end of Route 165 concurrency
New London	Voluntown	13.13	21.13	Route 138 west – Jewett City	Southern end of Route 138 concurrency
New London	Voluntown	13.52	21.76	Route 138 east / Route 165 east – Exeter, Rockville	Northern end of Route 138/Route 165 concurrency
Windham	Sterling	21.74	34.99	Route 14A – Oneco, Plainfield	Northern terminus
1.000 mi = 1.609 km; 1.000 km = 0.621 mi
