= Interstate 395 (Connecticut–Massachusetts) =

Highway in Connecticut and Massachusetts

Interstate 395
- I-395 highlighted in red

Route information
- Auxiliary route of I-95
- Maintained by ConnDOT and MassDOT
- Length: 66.60 mi (107.18 km)
- Existed: 1983–present
- NHS: Entire route

Major junctions
- South end: I-95 / US 1 in East Lyme, CT
- Route 2A in Montville, CT; Route 2 / Route 32 in Norwich, CT; US 6 in Killingly, CT; US 44 in Putnam, CT
- North end: I-90 / Mass Pike / I-290 / US 20 / Route 12 in Auburn, MA

Location
- Country: United States
- States: Connecticut, Massachusetts
- Counties: CT: New London, Windham; MA: Worcester

Highway system
- Interstate Highway System; Main; Auxiliary; Suffixed; Business; Future
← I-384	CT	→ I-484
← I-391	MA	→ I-495
← Route 49	CT 52	→ Route 53
← Route 49	MA 52	→ Route 53

Interstate 395 (I-395) is an auxiliary Interstate Highway in the U.S. states of Connecticut and Massachusetts; it is maintained by the Connecticut Department of Transportation (CTDOT) and the Massachusetts Department of Transportation (MassDOT). Spanning nearly 67 miles (108 km) on a south–north axis, it is the only spur route of I-95 in Connecticut. The 36-mile (58 km) section between its splits from I-95 in East Lyme and SR 695 in Plainfield is a component highway of the Connecticut Turnpike. Within that state, the highway is named the American Ex-Prisoner of War Memorial Highway from Plainfield to Thompson.

The highway was first established as part of the Connecticut Turnpike in 1958, while the Connecticut Route 52 designation was applied to the portion north of the turnpike in 1967. Connecticut Route 52 was intended to become a southern extension of I-290, although the current designation of I-395 was ultimately assigned in 1983.

== Route description ==
Lengths
	mi	km
CT	54.69	88.02
MA	11.91	19.17
Total	66.60	107.18

=== Connecticut ===
I-395 begins at the East Lyme–Waterford town line as the Connecticut Turnpike leaves I-95 as the latter route turns more easterly toward New London. It is a relatively rural Interstate for most of its length. It passes through Waterford into Montville where it meets Route 2A at exit 9. Eastbound Route 2A provides access to the Mohegan Sun casino, while westbound Route 2A runs concurrently with I-395 into Norwich and ends at exit 13, where it terminates as it joins its parent route, Route 2. After passing Route 2, I-395 bends to the east, and continues into Lisbon, Griswold, and Plainfield, where it bends more northerly and parallels Route 12 for most of the rest of its length. At the Plainfleld–Killingly town line, the Connecticut Turnpike splits to the east as SR 695, providing access to U.S. Route 6 (US 6) at the Rhode Island state line. I-395 continues north and meets US 6 in Killingly. After crossing into Putnam, it has an interchange with US 44. It then passes through Thompson before crossing the Massachusetts state line into Webster.

=== Massachusetts ===
After passing through Webster and Oxford, it enters Auburn where it has an interchange with US 20, which provides access to the Route 146 expressway. The I-395 designation for the highway ends as it meets I-90 (Massachusetts Turnpike) at exits 11A and 11B and becomes I-290 as it heads toward Worcester, although the mileage for I-395 runs in parallel with its I-290 counterpart until it reaches I-495 in Marlborough. It should also be noted that I-395 does not connect directly connect to the Mass Pike, but instead requires Route 12 southbound for access at exit 12 (formerly exit 7), with traffic passing through at least one traffic light crossing.

== Service plazas ==
In Connecticut, there are two service plazas (a legacy of the turnpike) that provide 24-hour gas stations, convenience stores, plus a Subway and Dunkin' Donuts.

- Montville (milepost 8): It is southbound only between exits 9 and 6.
- Plainfield (milepost 35): It is northbound and southbound between exits 32 and 35.

The Connecticut State Police Troop E barracks occupies the former service plaza on the northbound side at Montville.

== History ==
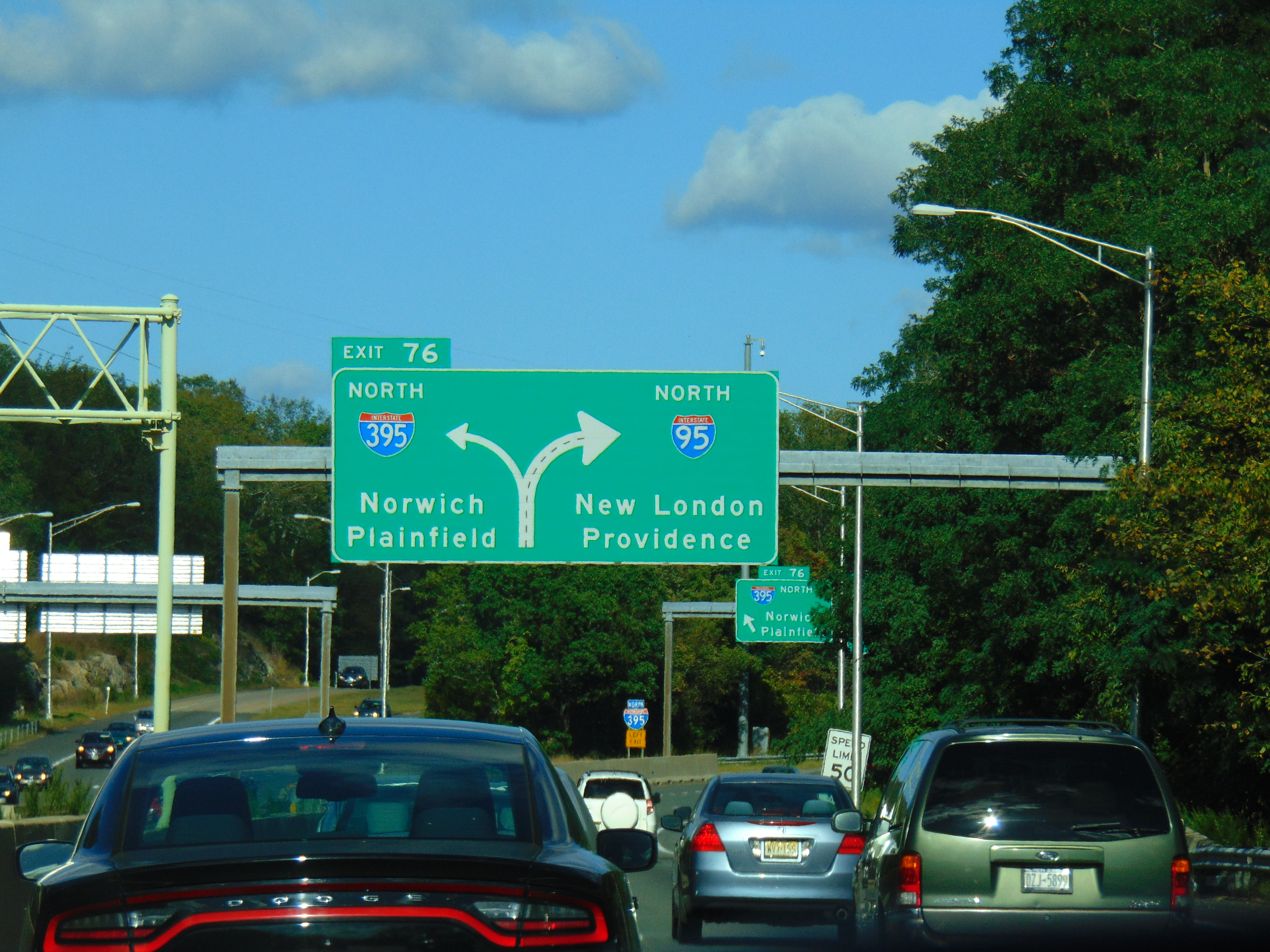
I-95 at the I-395 split in East Lyme/Waterford town line.

The highway that is now I-395 from its southern terminus with I-95 in East Lyme to exit 35 in Plainfield opened on January 2, 1958, as part of the 129-mile (208 km) Connecticut Turnpike from Greenwich at the New York state line to Killingly at the Rhode Island state line. In 1964, work began on a freeway extension beyond the turnpike in Plainfield north toward Worcester, connecting to the Massachusetts Turnpike (I-90). This new freeway, as well as the existing section of the Connecticut Turnpike from East Lyme to Plainfield, would be designated as Connecticut Route 52. The section between Plainfield and US 44 near Putnam opened in 1967, and the section from US 44 to the Massachusetts state line opened in 1969. Massachusetts completed its section of the freeway in 1977.

In 1983, in response to the cancelation of the proposed I-84 extension from Hartford to Providence, CTDOT wished to supplement the state's loss of Interstate mileage by applying an Interstate designation to Connecticut Route 52. Initially, I-290 was to be extended from its southern terminus in Auburn, Massachusetts. However, in 1983, it was decided to instead apply the I-395 designation to the freeway south of I-90.

In May 2013, CTDOT announced that a project that would begin in early 2014 that included renumbering exits along its section of I-395, and Connecticut Route 2A from the then-current sequential numbering system to a distance-based scheme to conform with federal exit numbering standards. During the transition, old exit numbers were posted atop the new exit numbers through 2017 to lessen any confusion. The renumbering began on June 24, 2015, and ended in January 2016; the project included renumbering one sign in Massachusetts announcing the first southbound Connecticut exit.

== Exit list ==
Exit numbers were changed from sequential to distance-based numbering in Connecticut between July and December 2015. Along with Connecticut Route 2A, these were Connecticut's initial distance-based exit numbers. MassDOT also planned to switch exit numbers on all of its Interstates, including I-395, to distance-based numbering in 2016. But the contract to change exit numbers which was to be awarded in December 2015 was indefinitely postponed in the middle of 2016. It was not until November 18, 2019, that MassDOT confirmed that beginning in late summer 2020 the exit renumbering project will begin. On July 29, 2021, MassDOT announced that the exit renumbering on I-395 and I-290 will start on August 8, and it will last for two weeks.

State	County	Location	mi	km	Old exit	New exit	Destinations	Notes
Connecticut	New London	East Lyme	0.00	0.00	—	—	I-95 south / US 1 – New Haven, Flanders, Waterford	Southern terminus; exit 88B on I-95 north
Connecticut	New London	Waterford	2.13	3.43	77	2	Route 85 – Waterford, Colchester	
Connecticut	New London	Montville	5.34	8.59	78	5	To Route 32 south – New London	Southbound exit and northbound entrance; access via SR 693
Connecticut	New London	Montville	6.33	10.19	79	6	Route 163 – Uncasville, Montville	
Connecticut	New London	Montville	9.60	15.45	79A	9	Route 2A east – Ledyard, Preston	Southern end of Route 2A concurrency
Connecticut	New London	Norwich	11.08	17.83	80	11	Route 82 – Salem, Downtown Norwich	
Connecticut	New London	Norwich	13.71	22.06	81	13	Route 2 / Route 32 – Norwich, Hartford Route 2A ends	Signed as exits 13A (Route 2 east) & 13B (Route 2 west) northbound; northern terminus of Route 2A; no southbound access to Route 2 west
Connecticut	New London	Norwich	14.23	22.90	82	14	West Town Street (SR 642) – Yantic, Norwichtown (NB) To Route 2 west / Route 32 north – Hartford, Colchester (SB)	
Connecticut	New London	Norwich	18.17	29.24	83	18	Route 97 – Taftville, Occum	
Connecticut	New London	Lisbon	19.53	31.43	83A	19	Route 169 – Lisbon, Canterbury	Northbound exit and southbound entrance
Connecticut	New London	Lisbon	21.16	34.05	84	21	Route 12 – Jewett City, Griswold, Lisbon, Taftville	Signed as exits 21A (Route 12 north) & 21B (Route 12 south) southbound
Connecticut	New London	Griswold	21.80	35.08	85	22	Route 164 to Route 138 – Preston City, Pachaug	Northbound exit and southbound entrance; access to Route 138 via SR 630
Connecticut	New London	Griswold	22.28	35.86	85	22	Route 138 to Route 164 – Jewett City, Griswold	Southbound exit and northbound entrance; access to Route 164 via SR 629
Connecticut	New London	Griswold	24.26	39.04	86	24	Route 201 – Hopeville, Jewett City	
Connecticut	Windham	Plainfield	28.23	45.43	87	28	Lathrop Road (SR 647 north)	
Connecticut	Windham	Plainfield	29.65	47.72	88	29	Route 14A – Plainfield, Oneco	
Connecticut	Windham	Plainfield	32.30	51.98	89	32	Route 14 – Central Village, Moosup	
Connecticut	Windham	Plainfield	35.50	57.13	90	35	To US 6 east – Providence, RI	Northbound exit and southbound entrance; access via SR 695
Connecticut	Windham	Killingly	37.62	60.54	91	37	US 6 – Danielson, Willimantic, Hartford, Providence, RI	No northbound access to US 6 east; signed as exits 37A (US 6 east) & 37B (US 6 west) southbound
Connecticut	Windham	Killingly			92	38	South Killingly	Northbound exit and southbound entrance; access via Knox Avenue
Connecticut	Windham	Killingly			92	38	South Killingly, Danielson	Southbound exit and northbound entrance; access via SR 607
Connecticut	Windham	Killingly	41.16	66.24	93	41	Route 12 / Route 101 – Dayville, East Killingly	Route 12 not signed
Connecticut	Windham	Killingly	42.99	69.19	94	43	Lake Road – Attawaugan, Ballouville	
Connecticut	Windham	Putnam	45.24	72.81	95	45	Kennedy Drive	
Connecticut	Windham	Putnam	46.09	74.17	96	46	Route 12 / Heritage Road – Putnam, Putnam Heights	
Connecticut	Windham	Putnam	47.05	75.72	97	47	US 44 – Woodstock, East Putnam	
Connecticut	Windham	Thompson	49.52	79.69	98	49	Route 12 – Grosvenor Dale	Northbound left exit and southbound entrance
Connecticut	Windham	Thompson	50.25	80.87	99	50	Route 200 – Thompson, North Grosvenor Dale	
Connecticut	Windham	Thompson	53.57	86.21	100	53	Wilsonville Road – East Thompson, Wilsonville	
					Connecticut–Massachusetts state line			
Massachusetts	Worcester	Webster	1.006	1.619		1	Route 193 – Webster, Thompson, CT	
Massachusetts	Worcester	Webster	2.578	4.149	2	3	Route 16 – Webster, Douglas	To Route 12, Route 193 and Route 197
Massachusetts	Worcester	Webster	4.025	6.478	3	4	Cudworth Road – North Webster, South Oxford	Exit partially in Oxford
Massachusetts	Worcester	Oxford	6.583	10.594	4	7	Sutton Avenue – Oxford, Sutton	Signed as exits 7A (Sutton east) & 7B (Oxford Center west)
Massachusetts	Worcester	Oxford	8.989	14.466	5	9	Depot Road – North Oxford	
Massachusetts	Worcester	Auburn	11.495– 11.500	18.499– 18.507	6	11	US 20 to Route 146 (Route 122A) – Shrewsbury, Sturbridge	Signed as exits 11A (US 20 east) & 11B (US 20 west)
Massachusetts	Worcester	Auburn	11.94	19.22	—	—	I-90 / Mass Pike / I-290 east / Route 12 to I-190 north – Worcester, Marlboro	Continuation east; exit 90 on I-90 / Mass Pike
1.000 mi = 1.609 km; 1.000 km = 0.621 mi: Concurrency terminus; Incomplete access
