= Connecticut Route 165 =

State highway in New London County, Connecticut, US

Route 165
- Map of New London County in southeastern Connecticut with Route 165 highlighted in red

Route information
- Maintained by CTDOT
- Length: 16.01 mi (25.77 km)
- Existed: 1932–present

Major junctions
- West end: Route 2 in Norwich
- Route 49 / Route 138 in Voluntown
- East end: Route 165 at the Rhode Island state line in Voluntown

Location
- Country: United States
- State: Connecticut
- Counties: New London

Highway system
- Connecticut State Highway System; Interstate; US; State; SSR; SR; Scenic
← Route 164	→ Route 166

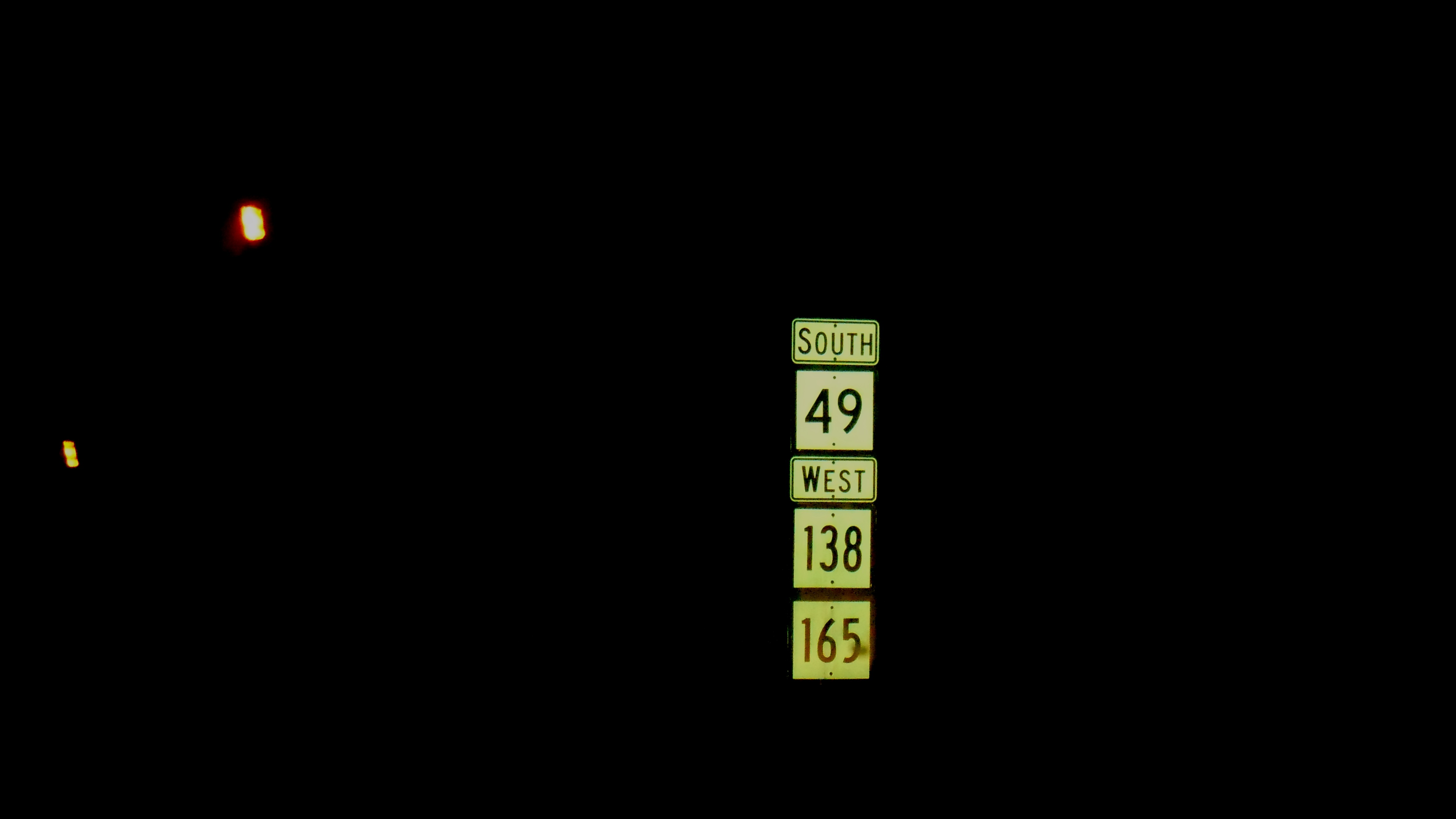
CT 165 overlapping CT 138 and CT 49 in Voluntown.

Route 165 is a state highway in southeastern Connecticut running from Norwich to the Rhode Island state line in Voluntown, where it continues as Rhode Island Route 165.

== Route description ==
Route 165 begins at an intersection with Route 2 in eastern Norwich and heads northeast into Preston. In Preston, it continues east through the town into Griswold. In Griswold, it continues generally east-northeast across Pachaug Pond and Glasgo Pond before continuing into Voluntown. In Voluntown, it heads northeast to overlap Route 49 and Route 138 in a triple concurrency. It turns east with Routes 49 and 138, then continues east in a concurrency with Route 138. After leaving Route 138, Route 165 continues east to the Rhode Island state line, meeting RI Route 165.

== History ==
Route 165 was commissioned in 1932, running from Route 2 in Norwich to Route 138 in Voluntown, apparently on a different route around Pachaug Pond in Griswold. Between 1932 and 1936, it was rerouted to its current location crossing Pachaug Pond at its southern end. In 1947, it was extended to the Rhode Island state line. In 1960, a section in Norwich and Preston was rerouted from Long Society Road to its current location.

== Junction list ==
The entire route is in New London County.

Location	mi	km	Destinations	Notes
Norwich	0.00	0.00	Route 2 (East Main Street) – Colchester, Preston	Western terminus
Preston	5.16	8.30	Route 164 (Jewett City Road) – Ledyard, Jewett City	
Griswold	10.15	16.33	Route 201 (Glasgo Road) – Hopeville, North Stonington	
Voluntown	12.12	19.51	Route 49 south (Westerly Road) – North Stonington	Western end of Route 49 concurrency
Voluntown	12.20	19.63	Route 138 west (Jewett City Road) – Jewett City	Western end of Route 138 concurrency
Voluntown	12.59	20.26	Route 49 north (Ekonk Hill Road) – Sterling	Eastern end of Route 49 concurrency
Voluntown	13.69	22.03	Route 138 east (Rockville Road) – Rockville, RI	Eastern end of Route 138 concurrency
Voluntown	16.01	25.77	Route 165 east – Exeter	Continuation into Rhode Island
1.000 mi = 1.609 km; 1.000 km = 0.621 mi: Concurrency terminus
