= Connecticut Route 214 =

State highway in New London County, Connecticut, US

Route 214
- Map of New London County in southeastern Connecticut with Route 214 highlighted in red

Route information
- Maintained by CTDOT
- Length: 7.30 mi (11.75 km)
- Existed: 1963–present

Major junctions
- West end: Route 12 in Ledyard
- East end: Route 2 in Ledyard

Location
- Country: United States
- State: Connecticut
- Counties: New London

Highway system
- Connecticut State Highway System; Interstate; US; State; SSR; SR; Scenic
← Route 213	→ Route 215

Route 214 is a state highway in southeastern Connecticut, running entirely within the town of Ledyard and servicing Foxwoods Casino. Route 214 runs east–west across the entire town.

== Route description ==
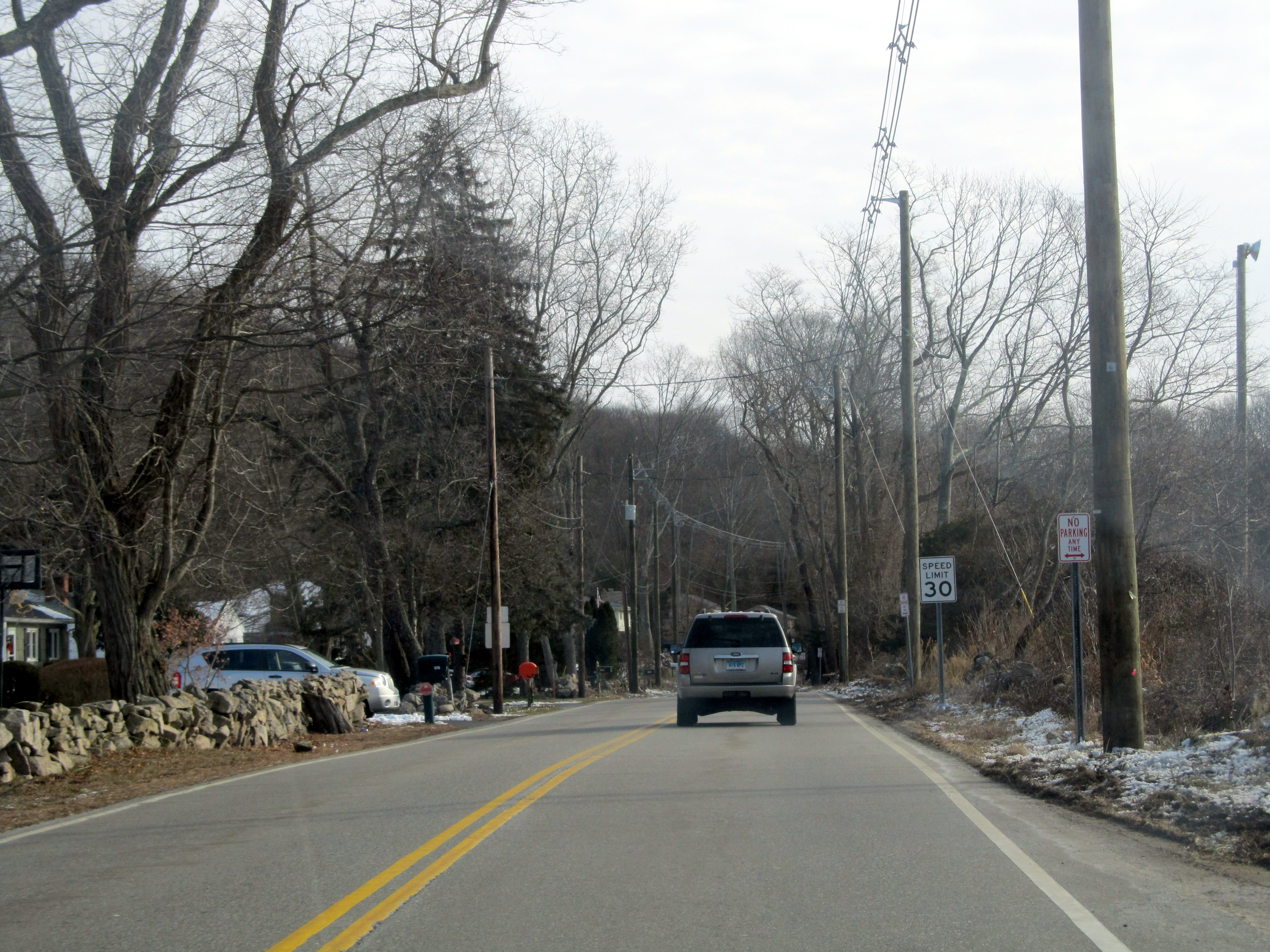
Route 214 near its western end in 2017

Route 214 begins as Stoddards Wharf Road at an intersection with Route 12 on the Thames River in the western part of the town of Ledyard. Stoddard Hill State Park is located near the western terminus of the route. Route 214 heads generally east across the town, intersecting with Route 117 just north of the town center. East of Route 117, Route 214 follows Iron Street and Indiantown Road for about four miles (6 km). Route 214 ends at an intersection with Route 2 at the eastern edge of the Mashantucket Pequot Indian Reservation near Foxwoods Casino.

Route 214 is classified as a collector road. It carries average daily traffic of about 4,100 vehicles, except for the easternmost 210 yards (190 m) between the casino entrance and Route 2, which has an average daily volume of 10,600 vehicles. The easternmost section is the only four-lane part of Route 214; for the remaining 7.18 miles it is a narrow two-lane road.

== History ==
Route 214 was designated in 1963 as part of the 1962 Route Reclassification Act. It has had assorted minor improvements since then to accommodate casino traffic.

== Junction list ==
The entire route is in Ledyard, New London County.

mi	km	Destinations	Notes
0.00	0.00	Route 12 – Groton, Norwich	Western terminus
2.92	4.70	Route 117 – Poquetanuck, Center Groton	
7.30	11.75	Route 2 / Foxwoods Boulevard (SR 680 west) – North Stonington, Norwich	Eastern terminus
1.000 mi = 1.609 km; 1.000 km = 0.621 mi
