= Preston Historical Society =

Historical society located in Preston, Connecticut

- Type: Nonprofit, historical society
- Headquarters: Long Society Meetinghouse
- President: Bridget Park
- Website: https://www.preston-ct.org/294/Historical-Society

The Preston Historical Society is a historical society located in Preston, Connecticut. They maintain historical records for the town and maintain historical locations, such as National Register of Historic Places listed places like the Long Society Meetinghouse and Preston City Historic District.

== Organization ==
The Historical Society is a small, volunteer operated organization. They meet four times a year, generally within the Long Society Meetinghouse, with exceptions made for cold or hot weather.

== Activities ==
The Preston Historical Society has extensively cataloged Preston history and has produced publications documenting it, such as records of the many small cemeteries within the town and Preston in Review. They are in the process of digitizing their collection.

The Society maintains and advocates for historic and monuments, such as the Long Society Meetinghouse and a Revolutionary War memorial. They have also been involved with historical research on Norwich State Hospital and Amos Lake. During their restoration of the Long Society Meetinghouse, the Society formed a relationship with the Mohegan Tribe.

The Society has also been involved in archaeological research within Preston, especially relating to historic New England architecture. In 2015, they held an archaeological excavation at the Meetinghouse.

== See also ==
- List of historical societies in Connecticut
