= Connecticut Route 216 =

State highway in New London County, Connecticut, US

Route 216
- Map of New London County in southeastern Connecticut with Route 216 highlighted in red

Route information
- Maintained by CTDOT
- Length: 2.78 mi (4.47 km)
- Existed: 1933–present

Major junctions
- West end: Route 49 in North Stonington
- I-95 / Route 184 in North Stonington
- East end: Route 216 at the Rhode Island state line in Ashaway, RI

Location
- Country: United States
- State: Connecticut
- Counties: New London

Highway system
- Connecticut State Highway System; Interstate; US; State; SSR; SR; Scenic
← Route 215	→ Route 217

Route 216 is a state highway in southeastern Connecticut, running entirely within the town of North Stonington. It connects Route 49 to the Rhode Island state line and serves the village of Clarks Falls.

== Route description ==
Route 216 begins at an intersection with Route 49 in the eastern part of the town of North Stonington. It heads east to the village of Clarks Falls, then continues southeast past the village intersecting I-95 (at exit 111) just shy of the Rhode Island state line. It continues beyond the state line as RI Route 216. Route 216 is known as Clarks Falls Road for its entire length.

== History ==
Route 216 was established between 1932 and 1934 as a continuation of the already existing Rhode Island Route 216. The original route followed Denison Hill Road through the Laurel Hill community of North Stonington. It was realigned in 1962 resulting in a decrease of 0.88 miles (1.42 km) in its official length.

== Junction list ==
The entire route is in North Stonington, New London County.

mi	km	Destinations	Notes
0.00	0.00	Route 49 – Voluntown, Jewett City, Pawcatuck	Western terminus
2.46	3.96	Route 184 west (Providence–New London Turnpike)	Eastern terminus of Route 184
2.53	4.07	I-95 – New London, Providence	Exit 111 on I-95
2.78	4.47	Route 216 south – Ashaway, Charlestown, Burlingame State Park	Continuation into Rhode Island
1.000 mi = 1.609 km; 1.000 km = 0.621 mi
