= Connecticut Route 201 =

State highway in New London County, Connecticut, US

Route 201
- Map of New London County in southeastern Connecticut with Route 201 highlighted in red

Route information
- Maintained by CTDOT
- Length: 20.10 mi (32.35 km)
- Existed: 1934–present

Major junctions
- South end: Route 184 in Stonington
- Route 2 in North Stonington; Route 165 in Griswold; I-395 in Griswold
- North end: Route 12 in Griswold

Location
- Country: United States
- State: Connecticut
- Counties: New London

Highway system
- Connecticut State Highway System; Interstate; US; State; SSR; SR; Scenic
← Route 200	→ US 202

Route 201 is a state highway in southeastern Connecticut, running in an inverted "L" pattern from Stonington to Griswold.

== Route description ==
Route 201 begins at an intersection with Route 184 in northwestern Stonington and heads north into North Stonington. In North Stonington, it continues northeast and north, overlapping Route 2 before continuing north into Griswold. In Griswold, it continues north before turning west past Hopeville Pond. It then intersects I-395 before continuing to end at an intersection with Route 12 in the Jewett City section of Griswold.

== History ==
Route 201 was commissioned in 1934 from an unsigned state road (old SR 663) between Route 165 and Route 138 in Griswold. As part of the 1962 Route Reclassification Act, Route 201 was extended south to Route 2 and north to Jewett City (at Route 12). By 1963, it was extended further south to Route 184 in Stonington, absorbing most of former Route 119 in the process.

== Junction list ==
The entire route is in New London County.

Location	mi	km	Destinations	Notes
Stonington	0.00	0.00	Route 184 – Old Mystic, Clarks Falls	Southern terminus
North Stonington	4.13	6.65	Route 2 east – Pawcatuck, Stonington	Southern end of Route 2 concurrency
North Stonington	4.91	7.90	Route 2 west – Norwich, Hartford	Northern end of Route 2 concurrency
Griswold	12.08	19.44	Route 165 – Norwich, Voluntown	
Griswold	14.31	23.03	Route 138 – Jewett City, Voluntown	
Griswold	18.14	29.19	I-395 – Norwich, Worcester, MA	Exit 22 on I-395; former Route 52
Griswold	20.10	32.35	Route 12 – Plainfield, Lisbon	Northern terminus
1.000 mi = 1.609 km; 1.000 km = 0.621 mi: Concurrency terminus
