= Connecticut Route 164 =

State highway in New London County, Connecticut, US

Route 164
- Map of New London County in southeastern Connecticut, with Route 184 highlighted in red

Route information
- Maintained by CTDOT
- Length: 7.83 mi (12.60 km)
- Existed: 1932–present

Major junctions
- South end: Route 2 in Preston
- I-395 in Griswold
- North end: Route 138 in Griswold

Location
- Country: United States
- State: Connecticut
- Counties: New London

Highway system
- Connecticut State Highway System; Interstate; US; State; SSR; SR; Scenic
← Route 163	→ Route 165

Route 164 is a minor state highway in southeastern Connecticut, United States, running from Route 2 in Preston through the village of Preston City to Route 138 in Griswold just south of the borough of Jewett City.

== Route description ==
Route 164 begins as Preston Plains Road at an intersection with Route 2 in the southeastern portion of the town of Preston. It runs for about three miles (5 km) through rural Preston until it reaches Preston City, where it has a junction with Route 165. From here, the road becomes known as Jewett City Road, continuing north for 2.5 miles (4.0 km) towards the town of Griswold. In Griswold, the road name changes to Preston Road, continuing north for 1.9 miles (3.1 km) until the interchange with I-395 (at Exit 22). Route 164 continues for another 0.3 miles (0.48 km) beyond the interchange to end at Route 138 just south of the borough of Jewett City.

A section of Route 164 in Preston from the center of Preston City to the Griswold town line is designated a scenic road.

== History ==
The direct route from the village of Preston City to the borough of Jewett City was established as Route 164 in the 1932 state highway renumbering. No major changes in alignment or designation has occurred since.

== Junction list ==
The entire route is in New London County.

Location	mi	km	Destinations	Notes
Preston	0.00	0.00	Route 2 – Stonington, Hartford	Southern terminus
Preston	3.11	5.01	Route 165 – Norwich, Voluntown	
Griswold	7.54	12.13	To I-395 north – Worcester I-395 south – Norwich	Exit 22 on I-395; access to I-395 north via SR 630
Griswold	7.83	12.60	Route 138 – Baltic, Lisbon	Northern terminus
1.000 mi = 1.609 km; 1.000 km = 0.621 mi
