= Harbison =

Harbison is a surname. Notable people with the surname include:

- Beth Harbison, American author
- Clarence Ellis Harbison (1885–1960), American animal psychologist
- E. Harris Harbison (1907–1964), American academic
- Ed Harbison (born 1941), American politician
- Frederick H. Harbison (1912–1976), American organizational theorist
- Joan Harbison (born 1938), British academic
- John Harbison (born 1938), American composer
- John Harbison (pathologist) (1935–2020), first State pathologist of Ireland
- Mercy Harbison (1770–1837), American writer
- Michael Harbison, Australian politician
- Thomas Harbison (1864–1930), Irish politician
- Thomas Grant Harbison (1862–1936), American botanist
- Tony Harbison, American politician
- Tre Harbison (born 1998), American football player

Harbison may also refer to:

- Harbison cheese by Jasper Hill Farm

== See also ==
- Harbison Canyon, California
- Harbison Township, Dubois County, Indiana
