= Connecticut Route 354 =

State highway in New London County, Connecticut, US

Route 354

- Map of New London County in southeastern Connecticut with Route 354 highlighted in red

Route information
- Maintained by CTDOT
- Length: 7.37 mi (11.86 km)
- Existed: 1963–present

Major junctions
- West end: Route 85 in Colchester
- Route 2 in Colchester
- East end: Route 82 in Salem

Location
- Country: United States
- State: Connecticut
- Counties: New London

Highway system
- Connecticut State Highway System; Interstate; US; State; SSR; SR; Scenic
← Route 349	→ Route 361

Route 354 is a state highway in eastern Connecticut running from Colchester to Salem.

== Route description ==
Route 354 begins as Parum Road at an intersection with Route 85 in the town center of Colchester and heads southeast. It intersects Route 2 after 0.4 with a partial interchange at Exit 21. Route 354 continues southeast, becoming Deep River Road as it heads towards the town of Salem. In Salem, the road becomes Old Colchester Road and continues southeast to end at an intersection with Route 82 at the south side of Gardner Lake.

== History ==
Route 354 was commissioned from SR 654 in 1963 and has had no significant changes since. SR 654 itself first became a state road in 1955. A proposal to extend it to Route 32 in Montville was rejected in 1973.

== Junction list ==
The entire route is in New London County.

Location	mi	km	Destinations	Notes
Colchester	0.00	0.00	Route 85 – Salem, Hebron	Western terminus
Colchester	0.40	0.64	To Route 2 west / Route 11 south / Route 85 south – Hartford	Access via SR 637
Colchester	0.40	0.64	Route 2 east – Norwich	Exit 25 on Route 2
Salem	7.37	11.86	Route 82 – Montville, East Haddam	Eastern terminus
1.000 mi = 1.609 km; 1.000 km = 0.621 mi
