= Connecticut Route 163 =

State highway in New London County, Connecticut, US

Route 163
- Map of New London County in southeastern Connecticut with Route 163 highlighted in red

Route information
- Maintained by CTDOT
- Length: 12.86 mi (20.70 km)
- Existed: 1932–present

Major junctions
- South end: Route 32 in Montville
- I-395 in Montville
- North end: Route 2 in Bozrah

Location
- Country: United States
- State: Connecticut
- Counties: New London

Highway system
- Connecticut State Highway System; Interstate; US; State; SSR; SR; Scenic
| ← Route 162 | → Route 164 |

Route 163 is a state highway in southeastern Connecticut running from Montville to Bozrah.

== Route description ==
Route 163 begins as Oakdale Road at an intersection with Route 32 in the village of Uncasville within the town of Montville. It heads in a northwest direction and soon intersects I-395 (at exit 6) after half a mile. Route 163 then passes through the Palmertown community, passing in front of the Rand-Whitney company headquarters. It soon reaches the village of Oakdale, about 1.5 miles (2.4 km) later, where the road makes a few turns, crosses the Oxoboxo Brook, and continues northwest for another three miles (5 km) to reach Route 82 in northwest Montville. After overlapping Route 82 for 200 yards (180 m), it continues north along Bozrah Road and soon enters the town of Bozrah. In Bozrah, Route 163 veers to the northeast then continues for 4.5 miles (7.2 km) through rural areas before ending at an interchange Route 2 (at exit 23) west of the village of Fitchville. The road continues as unsigned State Road 612 for another 0.14 miles (0.23 km) to end at Fitchville Road, an old alignment of Route 2.

== History ==
The road connecting Uncasville through Oakdale to the Norwich and Salem Turnpike (now Route 82) was designated as a secondary state highway known as Highway 364 in 1922. As part of the 1932 state highway renumbering, old Highway 364 was renumbered to Route 163, running from Route 32 to Route 82. In 1936, it was extended along former SR 655 to its current northern terminus at Route 2 in Bozrah.

== Junction list ==
The entire route is in New London County.

| Location | mi | km | Destinations | Notes |
|---|---|---|---|---|
| Montville | 0.00 | 0.00 | Route 32 – New London, Quaker Hill, Norwich | Southern terminus |
| Montville | 0.54 | 0.87 | I-395 – New Haven, Norwich | Exit 6 on I-395; former Route 52 |
| Montville | 7.34– 7.46 | 11.81– 12.01 | Route 82 – Norwich, Salem | |
| Bozrah | 12.86 | 20.70 | Route 2 – Norwich, Hartford | Exit 23 on Route 2 |
| Bozrah | 12.86 | 20.70 | Haughton Road (SR 612 north) | Continuation north |
1.000 mi = 1.609 km; 1.000 km = 0.621 mi
