= Founders Bridge =

Bridge connecting Hartford and East Hartford, Connecticut

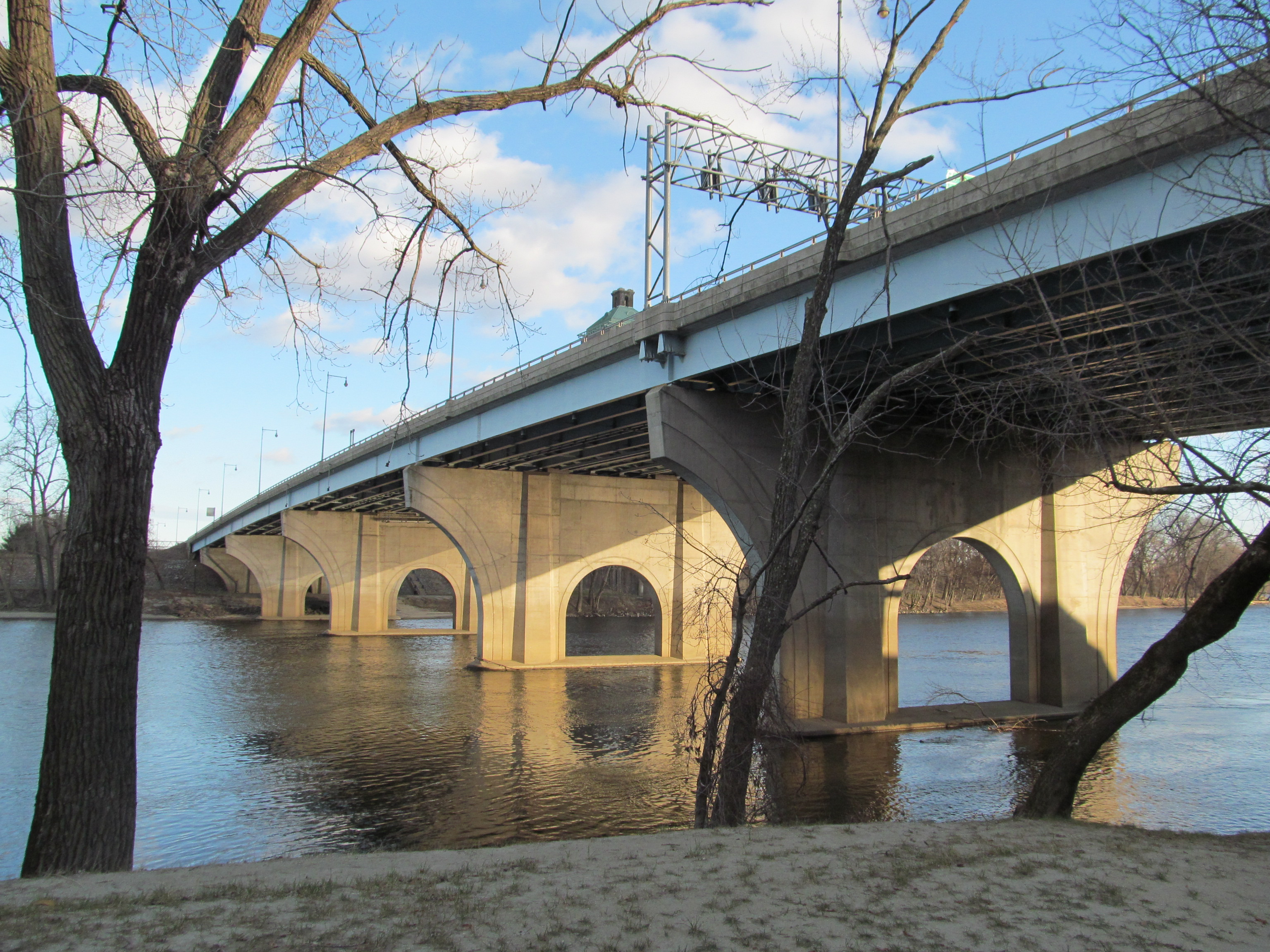
- Founders Bridge
- Coordinates: 41°45′56.32″N 72°39′55.57″W
- Carries: 7 lanes of Route 2
- Crosses: Connecticut River, I-91
- Locale: Hartford, Connecticut and East Hartford, Connecticut
- Official name: Founders Bridge
- Maintained by: Connecticut Department of Transportation

Characteristics
- Design: Stringer/multibeam or girder
- Total length: 1175 ft (358.1 m)
- Width: 86.0 ft (26.2 m)
- Clearance below: 49 ft (15 m)

History
- Opened: December 23, 1957

The Founders Bridge is one of the three highway bridges over the Connecticut River between Hartford, Connecticut and East Hartford, Connecticut. The steel stringer bridge carries the Route 2 freeway, and also crosses over Interstate 91 (which runs parallel to the river). As of 2013 the bridge had an average daily traffic of 29,200.

One of the centerpieces of Hartford's Riverfront Recapture project, it features a wide pedestrian promenade and access to the rest of the riverfront park area as well as to Constitution Plaza.

The bridge makes up a section of the East Coast Greenway, a 3,000-mile (4,800 km) system of trails connecting Calais, Maine to Key West, Florida.

== History ==
In 1950, the Bulkeley Bridge upstream was very congested with traffic, primarily because it was the only bridge that led to downtown Hartford, so it was planned to build a bridge just downstream, called the State Street Bridge. In 1955 they renamed this planned bridge as the Founders Bridge. In the same year, the Greater Hartford Bridge Authority was created to help with this bridge's planning, along with the Putnam Bridge and the Bissell Bridge. The bridge opened on December 27, 1957, and was put under the designation of CT 2. Tolls were removed about the time the bridge was connected to I-91 and I-84. In the late 1980s the bridge was considered for rebuilding to accompany a riverfront plaza being planned in the area. This led the state to rebuild the bridge in 1994 to add lanes, a large sidewalk, and path connections to East Hartford and Hartford. This rebuilding also eliminated the hazardous, congestion-prone connections to and from I-91 Northbound, as these ramps had been made redundant by the toll-free Charter Oak Bridge replacement span. In 2001, a walkway was completed to link the path across Columbus Boulevard to Constitution Plaza.

== See also ==
- List of crossings of the Connecticut River
