= Strawberry Park =

Campground in Connecticut, United States

Coordinates: 41°32′4.92″N 71°57′17.28″W

Strawberry Park Resort Campground is a 75-acre (300,000 m^{2}) campground located in Preston, Connecticut. The park offers RV and tent sites with water, electricity, and sewer connections. Lots are available for seasonal rental and for sale/lease-to-own. Lodgings such as log cabins, park models and trailer rentals are also available. The park is open April 1 to Columbus Day, Oct 13.
