= List of state roads in Connecticut =

State Road System

System information
- Notes: State roads in Connecticut maintained by ConnDOT

Highway names
- Interstates: Interstate X (I-X)
- US Highways: U.S. Route X (US X)
- State: Route X

System links
- Connecticut State Highway System; Interstate; US; State; SSR; SR; Scenic

In the U.S. state of Connecticut, state highways are grouped into signed routes, unsigned special service roads (SSR), and unsigned state roads (SR). State roads are feeder roads that provide additional interconnections between signed routes, or long entrance/exit ramps to expressways. Roads classified by the Connecticut Department of Transportation as state roads are given an unsigned number designation between 500 and 999, with the first digit depending on which Maintenance District the road is primarily located in. Below is a list of the state roads that are classified as arterial roads.

Number	Length (mi)	Length (km)	Southern or western terminus	Northern or eastern terminus	Local names	Formed	Removed	Notes
SR 500	0.51	0.82	I-84 / US 6 / Route 2 in East Hartford	Governor Street in East Hartford	—	—	—	
SR 501	0.77	1.24	I-84 / US 6 in West Hartford	Park Road in West Hartford	Trout Brook Connector	—	—	
SR 502	6.31	10.15	Route 2 in East Hartford	US 6 / US 44 in Manchester	East River Drive Extension, Silver Lane, Spencer Street	—	—	
SR 503	0.68	1.09	Sisson Avenue in Hartford	I-84 / US 6 in Hartford	Sisson Avenue Connector	—	—	
SR 504	0.70	1.13	Flatbush Avenue in Hartford	I-84 / US 6 in Hartford	—	—	—	
SR 505	0.53	0.85	Route 175 in Newington	Route 9 in Newington	Fenn Road	—	—	
SR 508	1.82	2.93	Route 4 in Farmington	I-84 / US 6 in Farmington	—	—	—	
SR 509	0.51	0.82	Route 322 in Southington	Route 10 in Southington	Clark Street	—	—	
SR 510	2.55	4.10	US 5 in East Windsor	US 5 in Enfield	Main Street, Depot Hill Road	—	—	
SR 511	0.38	0.61	Route 10 in Plainville	Route 72 in Plainville	Hooker Street	—	—	
SR 513	0.67	1.08	Route 75 in Suffield	End state maintenance	Bridge Street	—	—	
SR 514	0.20	0.32	US 5 in Enfield	Route 190 / Pearl Street in Enfield	Franklin Street	—	—	
SR 515	0.20	0.32	Pearl Street in Enfield	US 5 / Route 190 in Enfield	Frew Terrace	—	—	
SR 516	0.18	0.29	Route 2 in East Hartford	Main Street (SR 517) in East Hartford	Willow Street Extended	—	—	
SR 517	1.24	2.00	Route 2 in East Hartford	US 5 / Route 15 in East Hartford	Main Street, High Street	—	—	
SR 518	0.45	0.72	Silver Lane (SR 502) in East Hartford	I-84 / US 6 in East Hartford	Roberts Street	—	—	
SR 524	0.31	0.50	Route 3 in Cromwell	Route 372 in Cromwell	Berlin Road	—	—	
SR 526	1.66	2.67	Route 187 in Suffield	Route 168 in Suffield	Sheldon Street	—	—	
SR 527	2.05	3.30	Route 30 in Vernon	Route 74 / Route 83 in Vernon	West Street	—	—	
SR 528	2.59	4.17	Route 190 in Somers	Route 83 in Somers	Turnpike Road	—	—	
SR 529	1.33	2.14	Route 173 in West Hartford	Newington Avenue in Hartford	New Britain Avenue	—	—	
SR 530	0.58	0.93	Wethersfield Avenue in Hartford	Brainard Road in Hartford	Airport Road	—	—	
SR 531	1.39	2.24	Route 4 in Farmington	I-84 / US 6 in Farmington	South Road, Colt Highway	—	—	
SR 532	0.44	0.71	Route 177 in Plainville	Route 10 in Southington	Washington Street, Birch Street	—	—	
SR 533	4.03	6.49	US 6 / US 44 / Route 85 in Bolton	Route 30 in Vernon	Cider Mill Road, Tunnel Road	—	—	
SR 534	4.45	7.16	Route 83 in Manchester	Route 85 in Bolton	Charter Oak Street, Highland Street	—	—	
SR 535	0.21	0.34	Route 71 in West Hartford	I-84 / US 6 in West Hartford	Ridgewood Road	—	—	
SR 536	1.53	2.46	Route 372 in Plainville	Route 372 in Plainville	Pine Street, Woodford Avenue, Crooked Street	—	—	
SR 539	3.70	5.95	Route 20 in Hartland	Route 189 in Granby	Mountain Road	—	—	
SR 540	1.43	2.30	Route 189 in East Granby	Route 187 in East Granby	Hatchett Hill Road	—	—	
SR 541	0.82	1.32	Tunnel Road (SR 533) in Vernon	Route 30 in Vernon	South Frontage Road, Bolton Road	—	—	
SR 542	0.30	0.48	Tunnel Road (SR 533) in Vernon	Bolton Road (SR 541) in Vernon	Ferguson Road	—	—	
SR 543	0.38	0.61	Route 314 in Wethersfield	Maple Avenue at Wethersfield–Hartford town line	Berlin Turnpike	—	—	
SR 545	0.15	0.24	Route 66 in Middletown	Route 9 / Route 17 in Middletown	Washington Street	—	—	
SR 549	1.14	1.83	US 6 in Farmington	South Road (SR 531) in Farmington	Birdseye Road	—	—	
SR 552	0.23	0.37	US 6 in Farmington	Route 10 in Farmington	Scott Swamp Road	—	—	
SR 555	1.30	2.09	Route 372 in New Britain	Main Street in New Britain	West Main Street	—	—	
SR 565	1.73	2.78	Route 179 in Canton	US 44 in Canton	Maple Avenue	—	—	
SR 569	0.17	0.27	I-91 in Windsor Locks	Route 159 in Windsor Locks	Lawnacre Road	—	—	
SR 571	1.52	2.45	Route 71A / Route 372 in Berlin	Route 9 in Berlin	—	—	—	
SR 572	0.48	0.77	Route 9 in Berlin	US 5 / Route 15 in Berlin	Frontage Road, Worthington Ridge Road	—	—	
SR 585	1.25	2.01	Route 168 in Suffield	Point Grove Road at the Massachusetts state line in Suffield	Babbs Road	—	—	
SR 597	0.58	0.93	Route 10 in Southington	I-84 in Southington	—	—	—	
SR 598	0.76	1.22	Pulaski Circle in Hartford	I-91 in Hartford	Whitehead Highway	—	—	
SR 600	0.67	1.08	Route 138 in Lisbon	Route 169 in Lisbon	Kinsman Hill Road	—	—	
SR 602	3.28	5.28	Route 154 in Essex	Route 80 in Deep River	Main Street, Warsaw Street	—	—	
SR 603	3.54	5.70	Route 85 in Hebron	Route 316 in Andover	London Road, Boston Hill Road	—	—	
SR 604	0.80	1.29	Route 153 in Essex	Main Street (SR 602) in Essex	Westbrook Road	—	—	
SR 605	0.30	0.48	Route 165 in Preston	Route 164 in Preston	Old Shetucket Turnpike	—	—	
SR 607	2.54	4.09	Route 12 in Killingly	US 6 in Killingly	Westcott Road	—	—	
SR 608	4.32	6.95	Norwich Avenue (SR 616) / McGrath Lane in Lebanon	Fitchville Road at Bozrah–Norwich town line	Norwich Avenue, Fitchville Road	—	—	
SR 609	0.97	1.56	Route 151 in East Haddam	Route 149 in East Haddam	Leesville Road	—	—	
SR 610	2.16	3.48	Route 32 in Franklin	Route 207 in Franklin	Baltic Road	—	—	
SR 612	0.14	0.23	Route 163 in Bozrah	Fitchville Road (SR 608) in Bozrah	Haughton Road	—	—	
SR 614	2.63	4.23	US 1 in Groton	Route 184 in Groton	Allyn Street, Mystic Street, Cow Hill Road	—	—	
SR 615	1.32	2.12	Route 2 in Colchester	Route 85 in Colchester	Old Hartford Road, Broadway	—	—	
SR 616	6.83	10.99	Route 85 in Colchester	Road end in Lebanon	Norwich Avenue, McGrath Lane	—	—	
SR 617	0.85	1.37	I-95 / Route 2 in North Stonington	Route 49 in North Stonington	—	—	—	
SR 618	0.69	1.11	Westcott Road (SR 607) in Killingly	US 6 in Killingly	North Frontage Road	—	—	
SR 619	0.49	0.79	I-395 in Killingly	Westcott Road (SR 607) in Killingly	Gauthier Avenue	—	—	
SR 620	0.31	0.50	Route 171 in Union	End state maintenance	Mashapaug Road	—	—	
SR 621	0.10	0.16	Route 9 / Route 153 in Essex	Route 154 in Essex	—	—	—	
SR 623	1.23	1.98	One-way frontage road along southbound I-95 in New London and Waterford		North Frontage Road, Parkway North	—	—	
SR 624	0.60	0.97	I-95 in Waterford	US 1 in New London	Parkway South, South Frontage Road	—	—	
SR 625	0.99	1.59	US 1 in Westbrook	Route 145 in Westbrook	Grove Beach Road	—	—	
SR 626	0.25	0.40	Route 216 / Route 184 in North Stonington	Rhode Island state line	Providence New London Turnpike	—	—	
SR 627	0.91	1.46	Route 201 in North Stonington	Route 2 in North Stonington	Mystic Road	—	—	
SR 628	0.33	0.53	US 1 in Old Saybrook	End state maintenance	Spring Brook Road	—	—	
SR 629	0.26	0.42	Route 138 in Griswold	I-395 / Route 164 in Griswold	—	—	—	
SR 630	0.36	0.58	Route 164 in Griswold	Route 138 / I-395 in Griswold	—	—	—	
SR 632	0.80	1.29	Route 195 in Mansfield	US 6 / Mansfield City Road in Mansfield	North Frontage Road	—	—	
SR 633	0.79	1.27	Mansfield City Road in Mansfield	US 6 / Route 195 in Mansfield	South Frontage Road	—	—	
SR 635	0.58	0.93	Huntington Street (SR 641) in New London	Briggs Street (SR 638) in New London	Williams Street	—	—	
SR 636	0.64	1.03	Norwood Avenue in New London	Route 32 in New London	Briggs Street, Briggs-Mohegan Connector, Mohegan Avenue	—	—	
SR 637	0.51	0.82	Route 11 in Colchester	Route 354 in Colchester	Lake Hayward Road	—	—	
SR 638	0.16	0.26	Williams Street (SR 635) in New London	Briggs Street (SR 638) / Briggs-Mohegan Connector (SR 638) in New London	Briggs Street	—	—	
SR 639	0.77	1.24	US 1 / Jefferson Avenue in New London	US 1 in New London	Colman Street	—	—	Signed as southbound US 1
SR 640	0.14	0.23	Route 74 in Willington	Route 32 in Willington	Phelps Way	—	—	
SR 641	1.76	2.83	US 1 in New London	US 1 in New London	South Frontage Road, Huntington Street, Jay Street, Truman Street, Bank Street	—	—	
SR 642	2.65	4.26	Route 2 / Route 32 in Norwich	Route 2 / Route 32 / Route 169 in Norwich	Town Street, Washington Street	—	—	
SR 643	0.13	0.21	US 1 in New London	Route 213 in New London	Lee Avenue	—	—	
SR 644	0.75	1.21	Route 97 in Pomfret	US 44 / Route 169 in Pomfret	Murdock Road	—	—	
SR 646	0.18	0.29	Route 82 in Norwich	Route 82 in Norwich	North Thames Street	—	—	
SR 647	0.24	0.39	I-395 in Plainfield	Route 12 in Plainfield	Lathrop Road	—	—	
SR 649	2.69	4.33	Route 349 in Groton	US 1 in Groton	Rainville Avenue, Poquonnock Road, High Rock Road, Tower Avenue, South Road	—	—	
SR 654	0.28	0.45	Route 27 in Stonington	I-95 in Stonington	—	—	—	
SR 660	1.64	2.64	Route 97 in Norwich	Route 138 in Sprague	Bridge Street	—	—	
SR 661	0.11	0.18	Route 32 in Windham	Route 66 in Windham	Thread City Crossing (Frog Bridge)	—	—	
SR 664	5.70	9.17	Route 14 in Plainfield	US 6 in Killingly	Lake Street, Snake Meadow Road	—	—	
SR 668	2.00	3.22	Route 169 in Canterbury	Route 12 in Canterbury	Butts Bridge Road	—	—	
SR 680	0.99	1.59	Route 2 in Ledyard	Route 2 / Wintechog Hill Road in North Stonington	MGM Drive, Foxwoods Boulevard	—	—	
SR 693	1.41	2.27	Route 32 in Waterford	I-395 in Montville	Montville Connector	—	—	
SR 695	4.49	7.23	I-395 in Plainfield	US 6 in Killingly	Connecticut Turnpike	—	—	
SR 700	1.73	2.78	Route 130 / Water Street in Bridgeport	Route 130 / State Street Extended in Bridgeport	Fairfield Avenue	—	—	Westbound couplet of Route 130
SR 702	0.81	1.30	US 5 in Wallingford	I-91 in Wallingford	Wharton Brook Connector	—	—	
SR 703	0.20	0.32	Route 63 in Bethany	Route 42 in Bethany	Litchfield Turnpike	—	—	
SR 705	2.63	4.23	Route 162 in West Haven	Route 162 in West Haven	Ocean Avenue, Platt Avenue	—	—	
SR 706	0.82	1.32	Howe Street in New Haven	Route 10 in New Haven	North Frontage Road	—	—	Westbound couplet of Route 34
SR 707	3.62	5.83	Whitney Avenue at New Haven–Hamden town line	Route 10 / Dixwell Avenue (SR 717) in Hamden	Whitney Avenue	—	—	
SR 708	0.32	0.51	Old Gate Lane in Milford	I-95 / Woodmont Road in Milford	Old Gate Lane	—	—	
SR 709	0.27	0.43	Route 63 in Naugatuck	Route 8 in Naugatuck	South Main Street	—	—	
SR 710	0.31	0.50	Route 8 / Union Street (SR 723) in Naugatuck	Route 8 in Naugatuck	North Main Street	—	—	
SR 711	0.81	1.30	Penny Avenue (SR 730 and SR 743) in Trumbull	Route 108 in Trumbull	Huntington Turnpike	—	—	
SR 712	0.24	0.39	Route 110 in Shelton	Route 34 in Derby	Bridge Street	—	—	
SR 713	0.27	0.43	Route 15 in Fairfield	Route 59 in Fairfield	Congress Street	—	—	
SR 714	0.24	0.39	Huntington Street in Shelton	Route 108 in Shelton	Bridgeport Avenue, Center Street	—	—	
SR 715	0.51	0.82	I-91 in North Haven	Route 103 in North Haven	Universal Drive, Montowese Avenue	—	—	
SR 717	1.15	1.85	Route 10 / Whitney Avenue (SR 707) in Hamden	US 5 in North Haven	Dixwell Avenue	—	—	
SR 718	0.27	0.43	US 1 in Guilford	I-95 in Guilford	Goose Lane	—	—	
SR 719	2.02	3.25	Route 123 in Norwalk	US 7 in Norwalk	Main Avenue	—	—	
SR 720	0.26	0.42	Hartford Turnpike in North Haven	US 5 in North Haven	Devine Street	—	—	
SR 721	1.85	2.98	Route 67 in Seymour	Old Turnpike in Beacon Falls	North Street, North Main Street, South Main Street	—	—	
SR 722	0.37	0.60	US 1 in Bridgeport	Route 8 in Bridgeport	Chopsey Hill Road	—	—	
SR 723	0.16	0.26	North Main Street (SR 710) in Naugatuck	North Main Street (SR 710) in Naugatuck	Union Street, Golden Court	—	—	
SR 724	0.6	0.97	MLK Boulevard / South Frontage Road in New Haven	Interstate 91 and Interstate 95 in New Haven	Oak Street Connector	—	—	Originally part of Route 34 until the early-2020s.
SR 725	0.08	0.13	Route 22 in North Haven	Route 15 in North Haven	Hartford Turnpike	—	—	
SR 816	1.7	2.7	Route 34 in Newtown	River Road No. 1 in Southbury		—	—	Original Route 6 surface routing, before I84.

== See also ==
- List of state routes in Connecticut
