= Clarence Ellis Harbison =

American animal psychologist

Clarence Ellis Harbison (March 3, 1885 – October 1, 1960) was an animal psychologist.

== Biography ==
C. Ellis Harbison was born in 1885 in Schenectady, New York. Previously divorced and widowed, he married Mary Louise Jorjorian in 1951 and had a son, Michael Harbison, in 1953. He resided in Darien, Connecticut. Stumping the panel, Harbison made an appearance on the popular [career/identity] guessing game television show, What's My Line?, in 1954. He died at age 75 on October 1, 1960, in Preston, Connecticut.
