= Hallville Mill Historic District =

Historic district in Connecticut, United States

- U.S. National Register of Historic Places
- U.S. Historic district
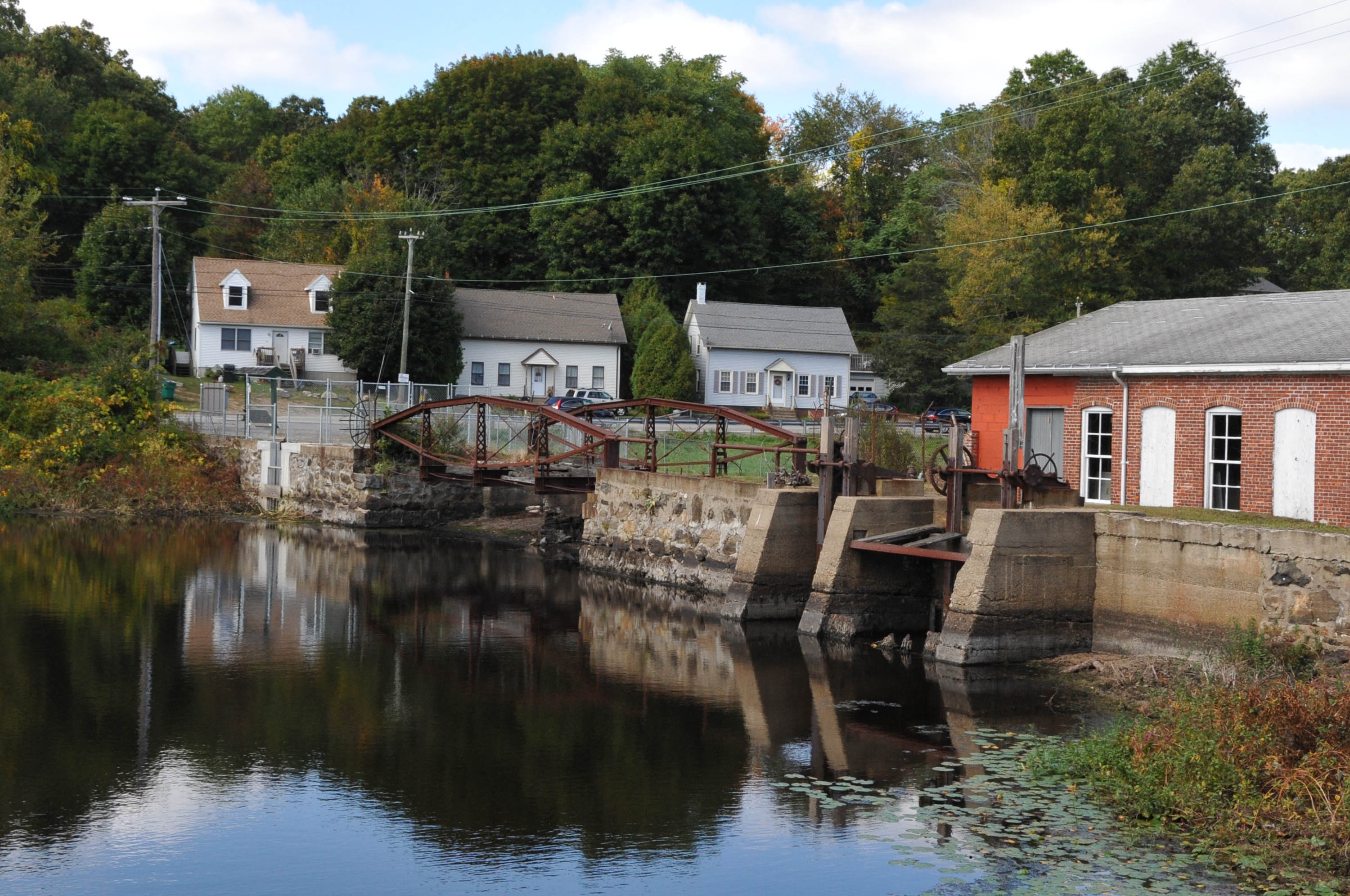

- Location within Connecticut Location within the United States
- Location: Hallville Road, Hall's Mill Road, and CT 2A on Hallville Pond, Preston, Connecticut
- Coordinates: 41°29′40″N 72°2′0″W
- Area: 50 acres (20 ha)
- Architectural style: Late Victorian, Mid-19th-Century Revival
- NRHP reference No.: 96000913
- Added to NRHP: August 22, 1996

Hallville Mill Historic District is a historic district in the town of Preston, Connecticut, that was listed on the National Register of Historic Places in 1996. Contributing properties in the district are 23 buildings, two other contributing structures, and one other contributing site over a 50-acre (20 ha) area. The district includes the dam that forms Hallville Pond (a mill pond), historic manufacturing buildings and worker housing, and the Hallville Mill Bridge, a lenticular pony truss bridge built circa 1890 by the Berlin Iron Bridge Company.

Hallville is a historic textile mill village. The first mill on the local stream, Indiantown Brook, was a fulling mill built in 1752 for finishing of locally produced homespun woolen cloth. Carding machines were added in the early 19th century. In 1857 Joseph Hall, Sr., a weaver born in England, built an industrial-scale woolen mill on the site. The mill remained under his family's ownership under the name Hall Brothers' Woolen Mill (named for the founder's sons) and was continually expanded over the years. As of 1888 the mill employed 175 workers and produced 860,000 yards (790,000 m) of cloth annually. The woolen mill burned in 1943, but manufacturing continued in Hallville until the 1960s. It was a major source of employment and tax revenue for the town of Preston.

The district has significance "as an intact representative small-scale 19th-century mill village containing a high concentration of contributing buildings and structures built as components of a company-owned town based initially on so-called Rhode Island manufacturing system." As such, the mill and its associated village provide physical evidence of the area's economic transition to industrial production during the late 19th century.

Route 2A, a two-lane undivided highway, passes through Hallville. Increased traffic volumes on this road, attributed to the nearby Foxwoods and Mohegan Sun casinos, are considered to be a threat to the historic character of the village.

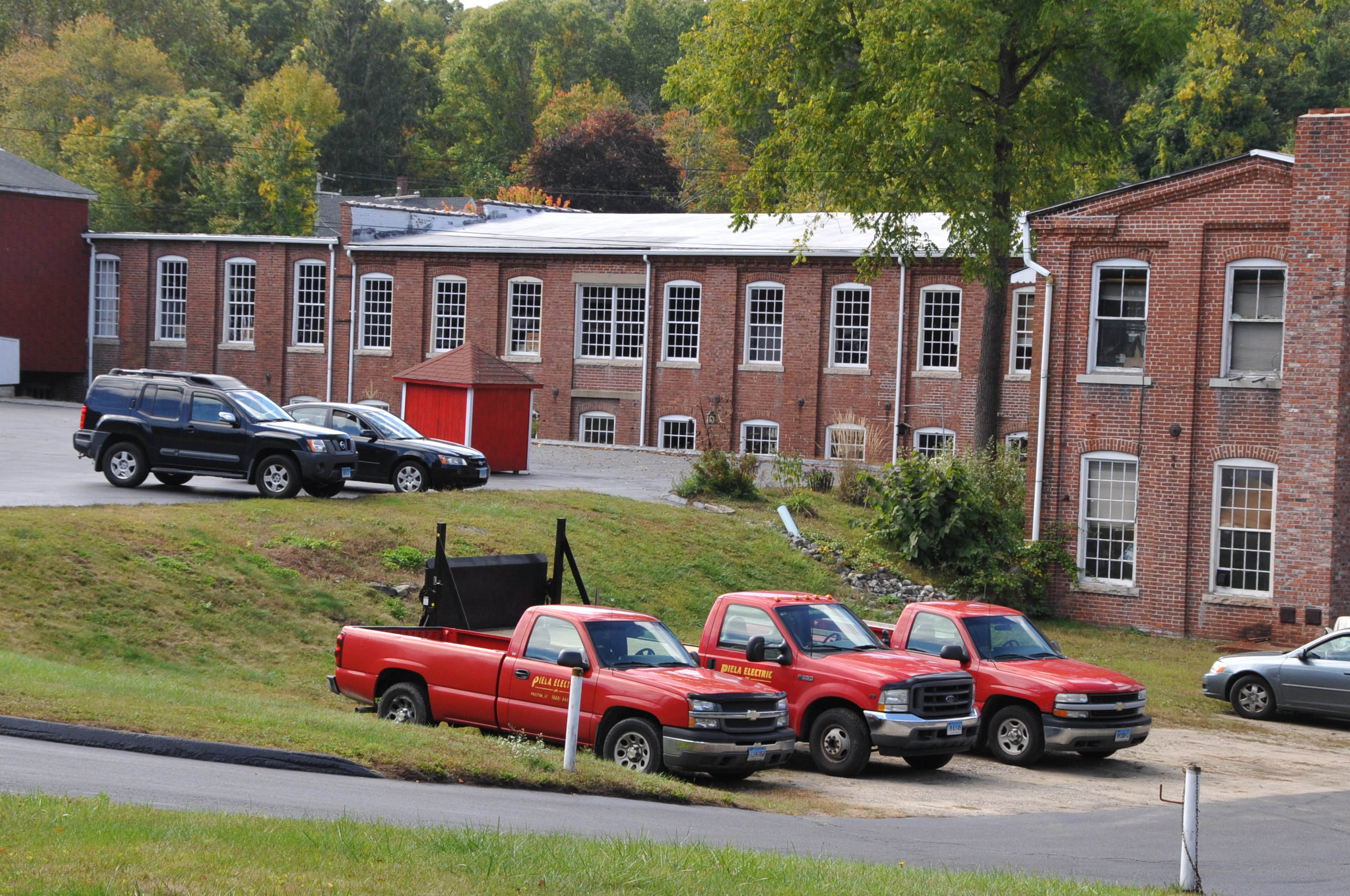

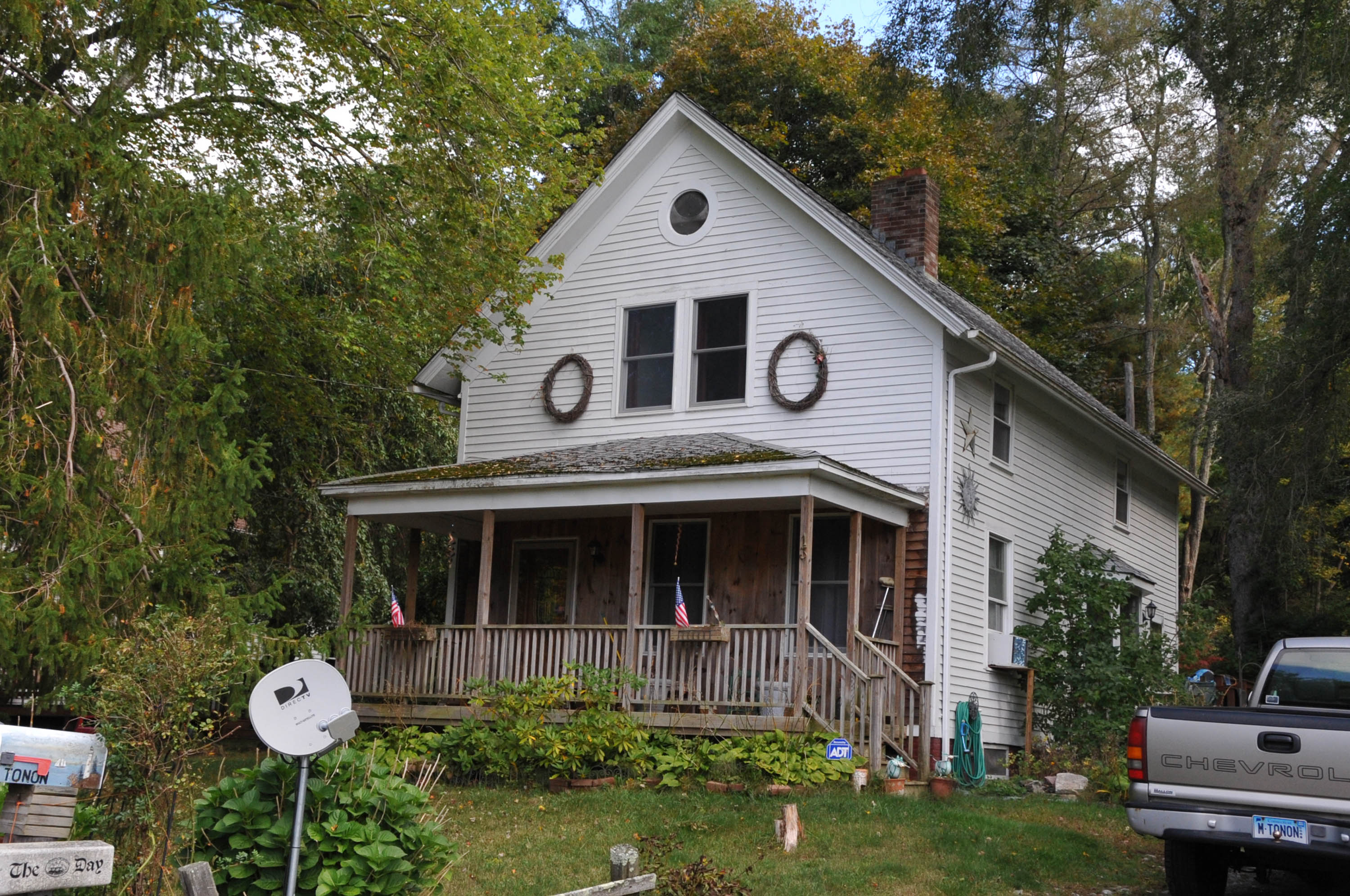

== See also ==
- National Register of Historic Places listings in New London County, Connecticut
