= Poquetanuck, Connecticut =

- Poquetanuck Village Historic District
- U.S. National Register of Historic Places
- U.S. Historic district
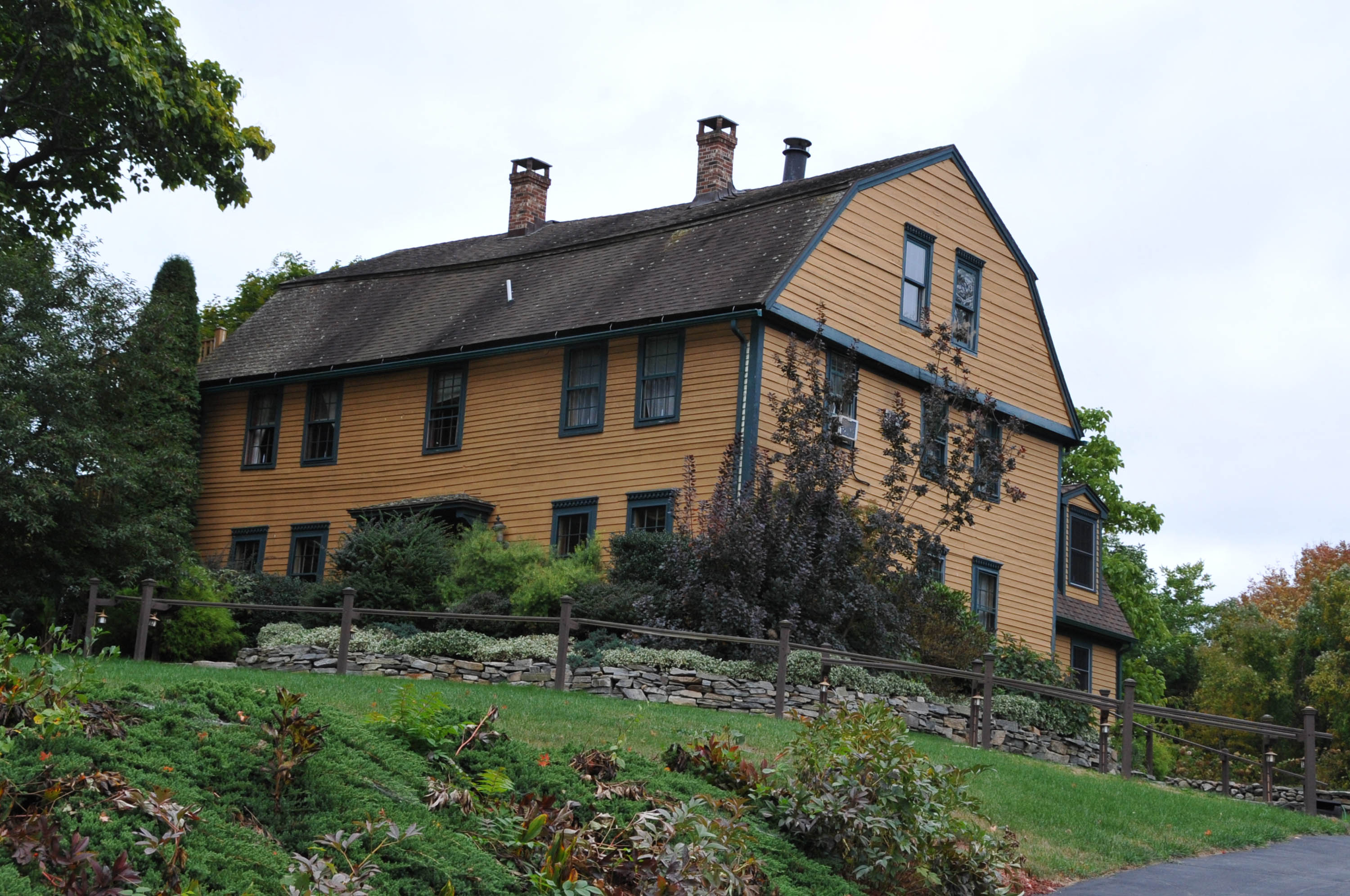
- Captain William Grant House, Built c. 1754

- Location within Connecticut Location within the United States
- Location: Roughly, along Main Street between CT 117 and Middle Road and along School House and Cider Mill Road, Preston, Connecticut
- Coordinates: 41°29′14″N 72°2′31″W
- Architectural style: Colonial, Mid 19th Century Revival, Late Victorian
- NRHP reference No.: 96000912
- Added to NRHP: August 22, 1996

Poquetanuck (/ˈpɑːkwəˈtænɪk/ PAH-kwuh-TA-nik) is a village in the town of Preston, Connecticut, United States, located near the banks of a bay known as Poquetanuck Cove that opens to the Thames River. The village includes the National Register of Historic Places (NRHP)-listed Poquetanuck Village Historic District.

== History ==
Historically, Poquetanuck was one of three distinct settlements in the town of Preston, the others being Preston City and Long Society. The village of Poquetanuck was the site of shipbuilding activity.

The historic district was listed on the National Register of Historic Places on August 22, 1996. It includes representations of Colonial, Mid 19th Century Revival, and Late Victorian architectural styles. At the time of the 1996 listing, there were 39 contributing buildings, two other contributing structures, and one contributing site in the district. In its National Register nomination, the district was described as "a well-preserved, cohesive, and densely built concentration of primarily 18th-century and early 19th-century village residences....[It has] the identity of location, feeling, and association of a center of colonial and early 19th-century daily life."

One contributing property in the historic district is a home built in 1754 by sea captain William Gonzales Grant which currently houses a bed and breakfast inn.

Route 2A, a two-lane undivided highway, passes through Poquetanuck. Increased traffic volumes on this road, attributed to the nearby Foxwoods and Mohegan Sun casinos, are considered to be a threat to the historic character of the village.

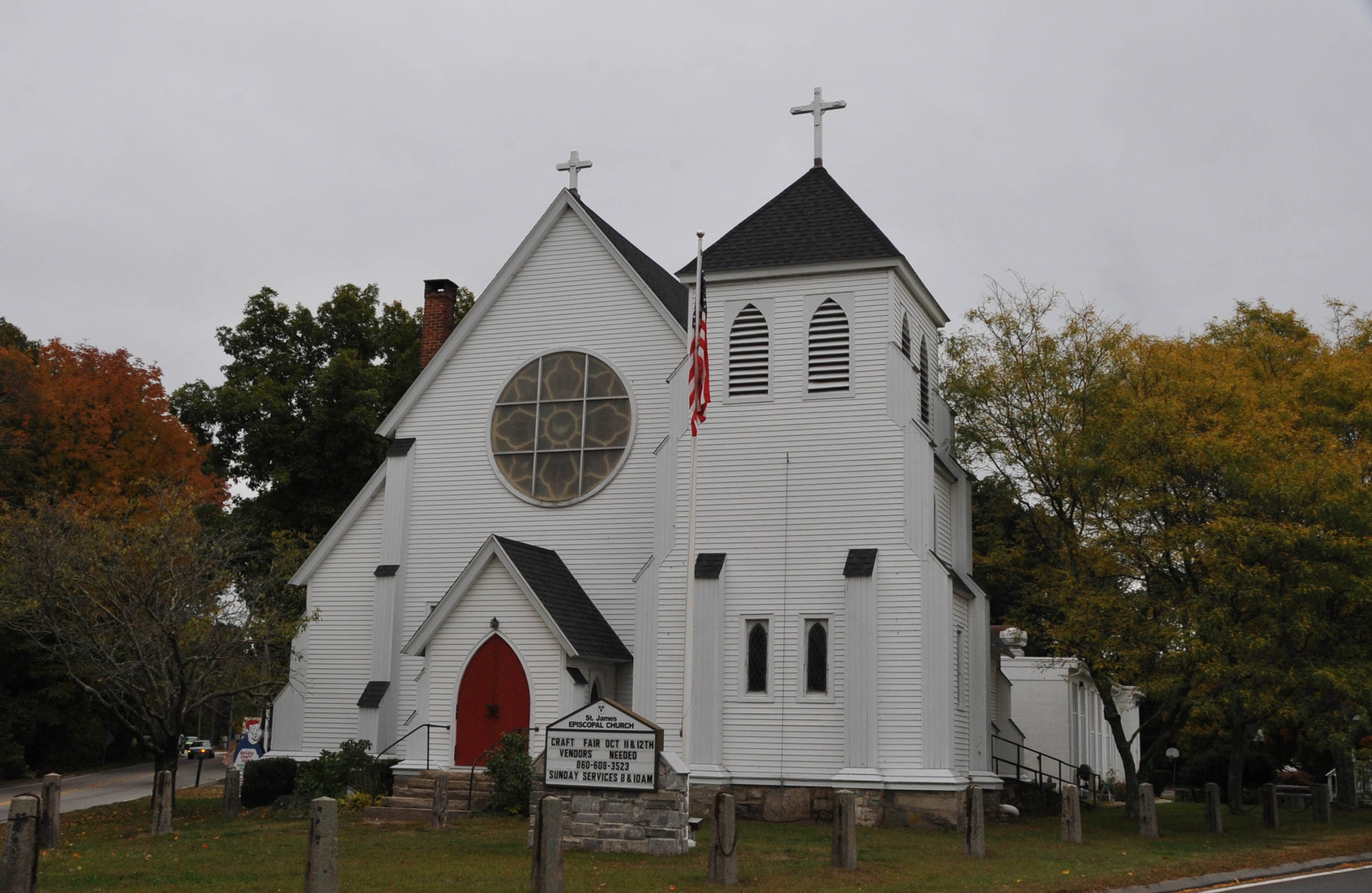
St. James Church, built 1896

A 234-acre (95 ha) tract with about one mile of shore frontage on Poquetanuck Cove belongs to The Nature Conservancy, which maintains it as Poquetanuck Cove Preserve.

== See also ==
- National Register of Historic Places listings in New London County, Connecticut
