= Preston City, Connecticut =

- Preston City Historic District
- U.S. National Register of Historic Places
- U.S. Historic district
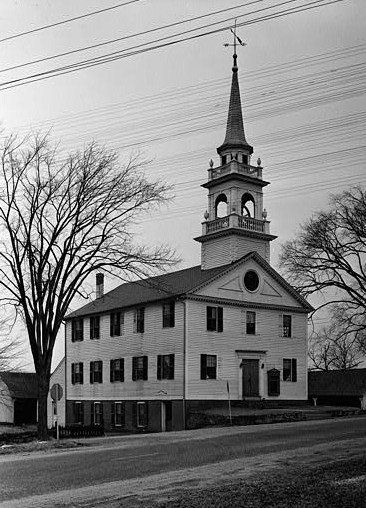
- Preston City Bible Church, in 1940

- Location within Connecticut Location within the United States
- Location: Amos and Old Shetucket Roads, Northwest Corner Road, and CT 164, Preston, Connecticut
- Coordinates: 41°31′42″N 71°58′31″W
- Area: 25 acres (10 ha)
- Architectural style: Greek Revival, Georgian, Federal
- NRHP reference No.: 87000452
- Added to NRHP: July 31, 1987

Preston City is a village and the original town center of the town of Preston, Connecticut, United States. The core of the village around the Junction of Old Northwest Road and Route 164 is designated as the Preston City Historic District, a historic district that is listed on the National Register of Historic Places. The district is located along Old Shetucket and Amos Roads, which, prior to the 1930s, were major thoroughfares.

The historic district was listed on the National Register in 1987. It includes 24 contributing buildings, one other contributing structure, another contributing site, and three contributing objects. It includes representation of Greek Revival, Georgian, and Federal architectural styles.

Historically, Preston City was one of three distinct settlements in the town, the others being Poquetanuck and Long Society. The first Congregational church in Preston City was founded in 1698.

Preston City prospered in its early years when the town of Preston was an important supplier of agricultural products to the port of Norwich on the Thames River, from which local farm goods were shipped to other ports on the east coast. The period of greatest prosperity was between the American Revolutionary War and circa 1830, and is reflected in the architecture of the homes built by successful local farmers and merchants.

== Historical significance ==
Preston City was established in 1686 as the town center for the newly designated town of Preston. The town of Preston was initially set up as an agricultural community for the port town of Norwich with Preston City as the focus for transporting farm goods to the larger town.

== Contributing properties ==
Contributing properties in the district include a church, a library, a blacksmith shop, a former tavern, and a poorhouse, as well as houses and some barns. All buildings are of wood-frame construction.

The Preston City Baptist Church was built in 1812. The building was turned to a different orientation, and its "three-stage steeple and bell tower with a pyramidal roof" were added later, in 1832.

The James Treat House is the largest residence and is located prominently on Amos Road. The "Mott and Downer House", a five-bay colonial house, are both on Amos Road and were both built before the American Revolutionary War.

The Calvin Barstow House, a Georgian colonial house surrounded by a picket fence, was built during 1786–1800. It includes a meeting room for the St. James Masonic Temple.

The Aron B. Gates House, built c. 1830, on Northwest Corner Road, is a Greek Revival building. It has a barn built c.1900.

The Thomas Meech House, built in 1795, on Northwest Corner Road, is Federal/Colonial. It includes a facade overhang that is unique within the district.

The Rev. Augustus Collins House, built c. 1830, on Shetucket Road, is Greek Revival.

The "Old Town Pound" on Amos Road is a stone wall enclosure. It served as a pound, a common feature of British medieval villages (where stray livestock might be held).

One house, the Ephraim Jones House, used to be the poorhouse of Preston and was originally built in 1733.

Other contributing elements include the Civil War Monument and Mott Memorial, erected in 1898.

Non-contributing elements include a Revolutionary War Monument dating from 1967 and the Downer-Doane Memorial Park, which, as of 1986, is maintained by the Preston Historical Society.

As of 1986, the district's area included only three modern intrusions.

== See also ==
- National Register of Historic Places listings in New London County, Connecticut
