= Long Society Meetinghouse =

Historic meetinghouse in Connecticut, United States

- U.S. National Register of Historic Places
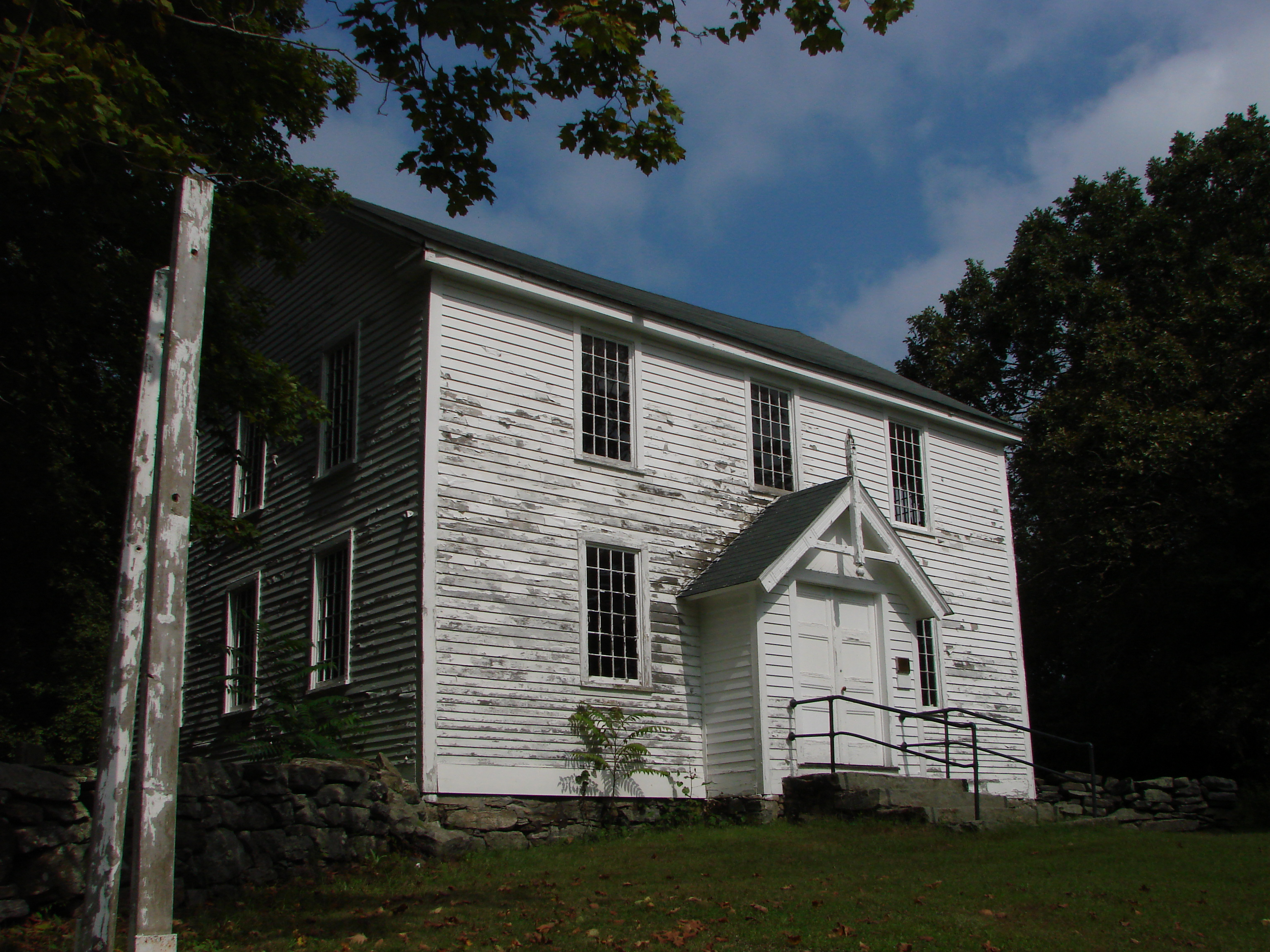

- Location within Connecticut Location within the United States
- Location: 45 Long Society Road, Preston, Connecticut
- Coordinates: 41°32′4″N 72°2′9″W
- Area: 2 acres (0.81 ha)
- Built: 1819
- NRHP reference No.: 76001996
- Added to NRHP: April 22, 1976

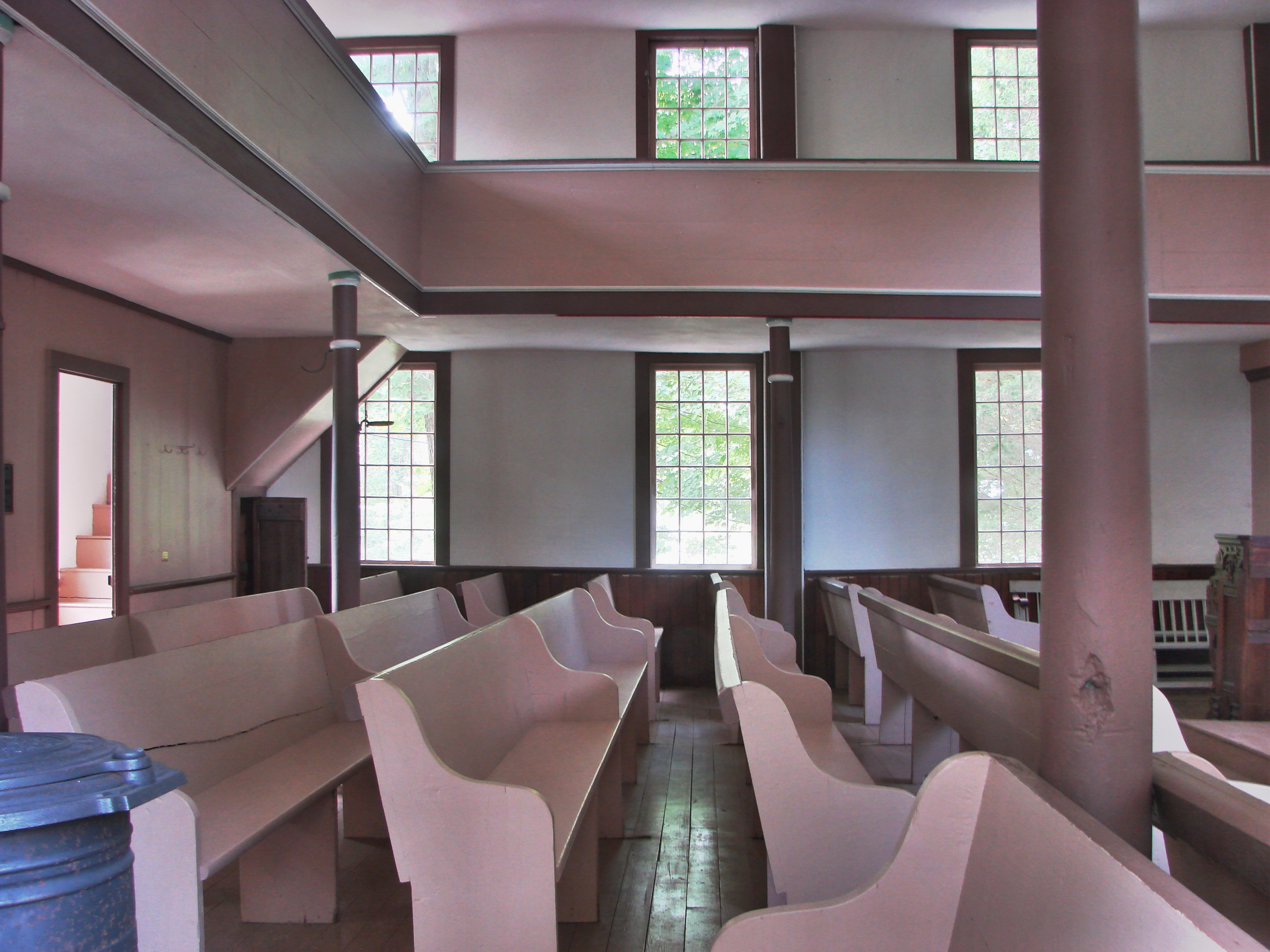
Interior

The Long Society Meetinghouse is a historic church building at 45 Long Society Road in Preston, Connecticut. It is one of only about a dozen surviving colonial "broad side" meeting houses, and is the last example surviving in Connecticut that has not been altered from that configuration by the addition of a tower or relocation of its entrance or pulpit. The meeting house was built from 1817 to 1819 on the site of an earlier meetinghouse, incorporating some elements of the earlier building. The meeting house was used both as a church and for civic functions, the reason for its plain, not overtly religious appearance. The building was added to the National Register of Historic Places in 1976.

== Description and history ==
The Long Society Meetinghouse is located in western Preston, on the north side of Long Society Road, surrounded by a small cemetery. It is a two-story wood-frame structure, with a side gable roof and clapboarded exterior. Its main facade is three bays wide, with the entrance at the center, sheltered by a late 19th-century enclosed vestibule. The vestibule has a gabled roof, and applied Stick style woodwork. The side walls are also three bays wide, with windows in each of the bays. The rear wall has only a single window, that for the pulpit, which is placed high in the center of the facade. The interior has a small entry area, from which stairs lead to the left and right to the gallery. The gallery extends around three sides of the interior, supported by columns with turned capitals. The open downstairs of the sanctuary is filled with simple bench pews.

The Long Society was a Congregationalist parish set off from Norwich, building its first meetinghouse at this site in 1726. The present building was built as a replacement in 1819; its relatively primitive interior, especially in comparison to meetinghouses of the late 18th and early 19th century, suggests that this building was basically a reconstruction of the original, some of whose timbers may have been recycled in its construction. The Society declined in size in the late 19th century, and its last records date to 1927. The building is now owned by the town and maintained by the local historical society.

== See also ==
- National Register of Historic Places listings in New London County, Connecticut
