= Preston, Connecticut =

- Town
- Town of Preston
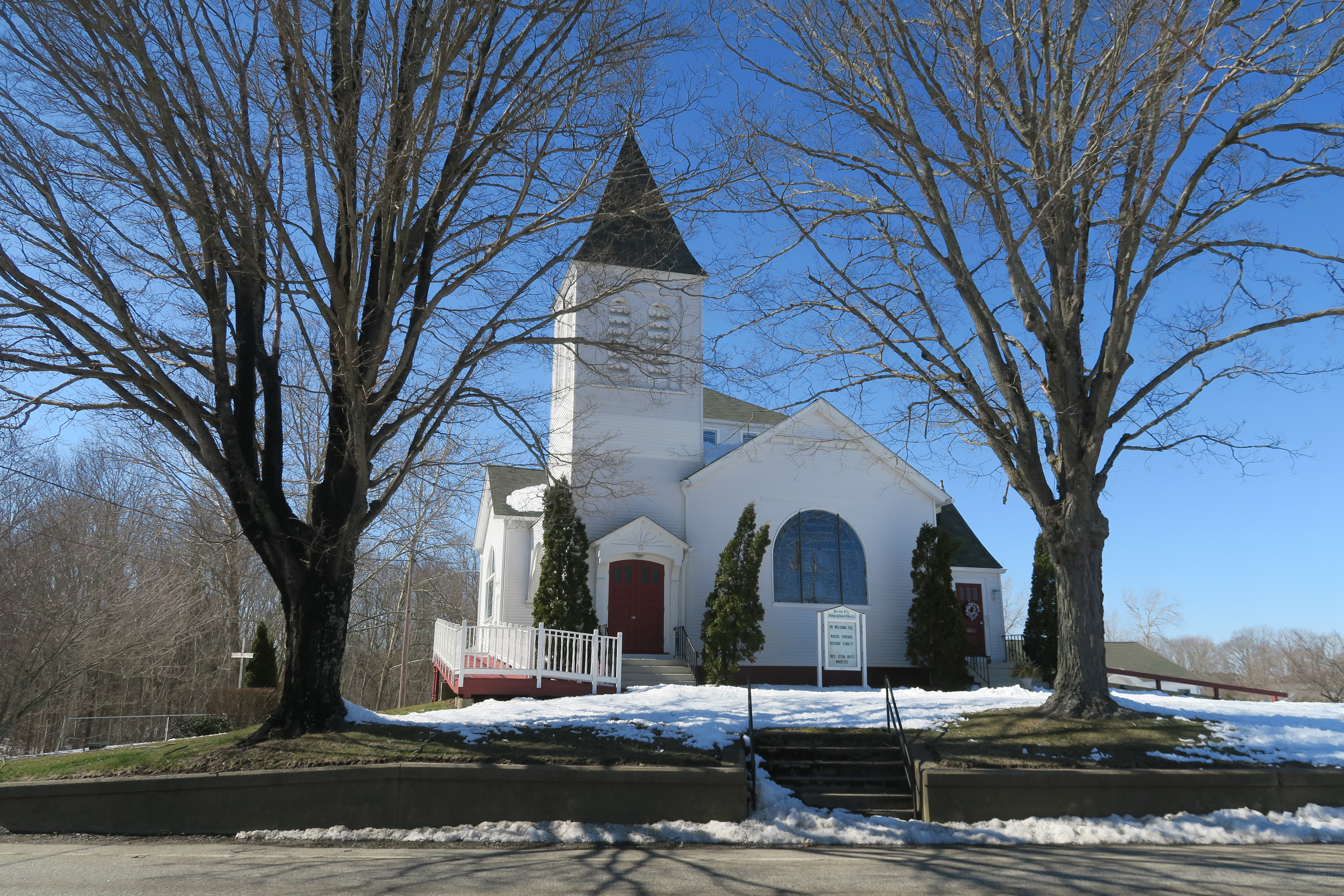
- Preston City Congregational Church

- Seal

- Coordinates: 41°31′N 72°0′W
- Country: United States
- State: Connecticut
- County: New London
- Region: Southeastern CT
- Incorporated: 1687

Government
  - Type: Selectman-town meeting
  - First selectman: Sandra L. Allyn-Gauthier (D)
  - Selectman: Gerald W. Grabarek (D)
  - Selectman: Kenneth L. Zachem (R)

Area
  - Total: 31.8 sq mi (82.4 km^{2})
  - Land: 30.9 sq mi (80.0 km^{2})
  - Water: 0.85 sq mi (2.2 km^{2})
- Elevation: 177 ft (54 m)

Population (2020)
  - Total: 4,788
  - Density: 155/sq mi (59.9/km^{2})
- Time zone: UTC-5 (Eastern)
  - Summer (DST): UTC-4 (Eastern)
- ZIP Code: 06365
- Area codes: 860/959
- FIPS code: 09-62150
- GNIS feature ID: 0213492
- Website: www.preston-ct.org

Preston is a town in New London County, Connecticut, United States. The town is part of the Southeastern Connecticut planning region. Its population was 4,788 at the 2020 census. The town includes the villages of Long Society, Preston City, and Poquetanuck.

== History ==
In 1686, Thomas Parke, Thomas Tracy, and several others petitioned for and were granted by the Connecticut General Court authority to establish a plantation seven miles square to the east of Norwich and north of New London and Stonington. Owaneco, son of the Mohegan sachem Uncas, gave a confirmatory deed for the land in 1687. In October of that same year, the town was formally incorporated as Preston, named for the English city of Preston, Lancashire.

Early trades in the area included shoemaking, metalsmithing, shipbuilding, and brickmaking.

The Ecclesiastical Society of Preston was first organized in 1698, with the first meetinghouse located in present-day Preston City. At the request of residents in the northern part of Preston (now the town of Griswold), the North Society was established in 1716. A splinter group, the Separate Church of Preston, was established in 1747 and continued until 1817. The Preston City Baptist Church (now the Preston City Bible Church) was established in 1812. The town of Griswold separated from the town of Preston in 1815.

On August 4, 1954, an Air France Lockheed L-1049C Super Constellation flying from Orly Airport, Paris, to Idlewild Airport, New York City, crash-landed in a farm field in Preston, with no casualties.

Preston has a large number of properties on the National Register of Historic Places, including the Preston City Historic District and the Long Society Meeting House.

== Geography ==
According to the United States Census Bureau, the town has a total area of 31.8 square miles (82 km^{2}), of which 0.9 sq mi (2.3 km^{2}), or 2.71%, is covered by water.

=== Principal communities ===
Three distinct settlements were in the town when it was first established:

- Long Society
- Preston City
- Poquetanuck

Other minor communities and geographic locations in the town are Hallville, Happyland, and Preston Plains.

== Demographics ==
Historical population
Census	Pop.	Note	%±
1820	1,899		—
1850	1,842		—
1860	2,092		13.6%
1870	2,161		3.3%
1880	2,523		16.8%
1890	2,555		1.3%
1900	2,807		9.9%
1910	1,917		−31.7%
1920	2,743		43.1%
1930	3,928		43.2%
1940	4,206		7.1%
1950	1,775		−57.8%
1960	4,992		181.2%
1970	3,593		−28.0%
1980	4,644		29.3%
1990	5,006		7.8%
2000	4,688		−6.4%
2010	4,726		0.8%
2020	4,788		1.3%
U.S. Decennial Census

As of the census of 2000, 4,688 people, 1,837 households, and 1,359 families were residing in the town. The population density was 151.7 inhabitants per square mile (58.6/km^{2}). The 1,901 housing units had an average density of 61.5 per square mile (23.7/km^{2}). The racial makeup of the town was 95.63% White, 0.75% African American, 0.83% Native American, 1.15% Asian, 0.02% Pacific Islander, 0.51% from other races, and 1.11% from two or more races. [Hispanics or Latinos of any race were 1.39% of the population.

Of the 1,837 households, 30.3% had children under 18 living with them, 62.9% were married couples living together, 7.0% had a female householder with no husband present, and 26.0% were not families. About 21.0% of all households were made up of individuals, and 8.1% had someone living alone who was 65 or older. The average household size was 2.55 and the average family size was 4.95.

In the town, the age distribution was 22.4% under 18, 5.9% from 18 to 24, 29.4% from 25 to 44, 28.3% from 45 to 64, and 14.0% who were 65 or older. The median age was 41 years. For every 100 females, there were 100.1 males. For every 100 females 18 and over, there were 100.1 males.

The median income for a household in the town was $54,942, and for a family was $62,554. Males had a median income of $44,053 versus $28,226 for females. The per capita income for the town was $24,752. About 1.6% of families and 3.3% of the population were below the poverty line, including 1.5% of those under 18 and 5.5% of those 65 or over.

== Education ==
According to the Preston Historical Society, "Schools were built in 'districts' to serve the local children, until two central schools, one on Poquetanuck and one in Preston City, were built between 1938 and 1940." Currently, public education in Preston is administered by Preston Public Schools, which operates the Preston Veterans' Memorial School (prekindergarten to grade 5) and the Preston Plains Middle School (grades 6–8). For high school, students go to multiple school districts of surrounding towns, including the Norwich Free Academy, Ledyard High School, Grasso Tech, Norwich Tech, Griswold High School, Wheeler High School, Marine Science Magnet High School, and New London Multi Magnet High School.

== Notable locations ==
- Strawberry Park is located within Preston.
- Pachaug State Forest
- Amos Lake
- Foxwoods Resort Casino is located just outside of Preston.

=== On the National Register of Historic Places ===
- Hallville Mill Historic District – Hallville Road, Hall's Mill Road, and Route 2A on Hallville Pond (added September 22, 1996)
- Long Society Meetinghouse was built in 1819 on the site of an earlier meetinghouse and added to the register in 1976.
- Norwich State Hospital is a former psychiatric hospital in the town.
- Poquetanuck Village Historic District – roughly along Main Street between Route 117 and Middle Road and along School House and Cider Mill Road (added September 22, 1996)
- Preston City Historic District – Amos and Old Shetucket Roads, Northwest Corner Road, and Route 164 (added August 31, 1987)

== Notable people ==
- Nathan Belcher (1813–1891), lawyer, Connecticut state senator, and US congressman, born in Preston
- Jonathan Brewster (1593–1659), buried in Preston
- Isaac E. Crary (1804–1854), the first elected congressman from the state of Michigan, born in Preston
- William Howard Doane (1831–1915), industrialist and composer
- Beriah Green (1795–1874), abolitionist and author born in Preston
- Clarence Ellis Harbison (1885–1960), animal psychologist who lived his later life and died in Preston
- John Haskell Hewitt (1835–1920), classical scholar and professor born in Preston
- George D. Prentice (1802–1870), controversial newspaper editor born in town
- Henry Brewster Stanton (1805–1887), abolitionist, social reformer and husband of Elizabeth Cady Stanton; born in town
- George A. Starkweather (1794–1879), congressman for New York, born in Preston
- Henry H. Starkweather (1826–1876), postmaster and congressman born in Preston
- Joseph Steward (1753–1822), artist who studied and lived in Preston
- Ann Story (1735-1817), local revolutionary war heroine born in Preston
