= Voluntown, Connecticut =

- Town
- Town of Voluntown
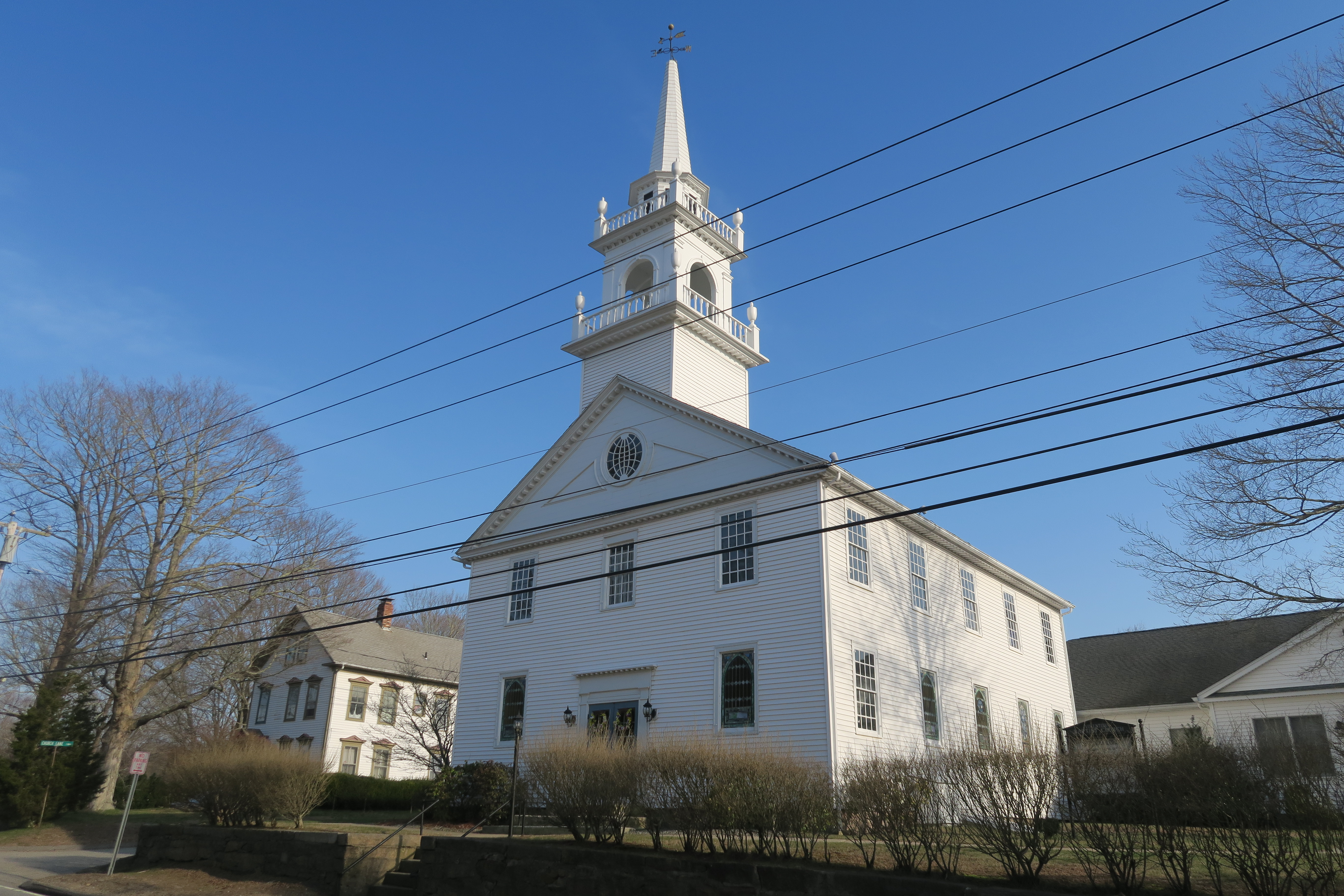
- Voluntown Baptist Church

- Seal

- Coordinates: 41°35′N 71°50′W
- Country: United States
- U.S. state: Connecticut
- County: New London
- Region: Northeastern CT
- Incorporated: 1721

Government
  - Type: Selectman-town meeting
  - First Selectman: Brian Muschiano

Area
  - Total: 39.8 sq mi (103.1 km^{2})
  - Land: 38.9 sq mi (100.8 km^{2})
  - Water: 0.85 sq mi (2.2 km^{2})
- Elevation: 381 ft (116 m)

Population (2020)
  - Total: 2,570
  - Density: 66.0/sq mi (25.5/km^{2})
- Time zone: UTC-5 (Eastern)
  - Summer (DST): UTC-4 (Eastern)
- ZIP code: 06384
- Area codes: 860/959
- FIPS code: 09-78600
- GNIS feature ID: 0213521
- Website: www.voluntown.gov

Voluntown is a town in New London County, Connecticut, part of the Northeastern Connecticut Planning Region. The population was 2,570 at the 2020 census. Voluntown was part of Windham County from 1726 to 1881, after which it became part of New London County.

== History ==
The town was named for the colonial volunteers in the 1675 King Philip's War who stayed to fight "and went not away". One of the founders of Voluntown was Lieutenant Thomas Leffingwell, who secured the town's approval in the colonial legislature and surveyed its original layout.

== Geography ==
According to the United States Census Bureau, the town has a total area of 39.8 square miles (103 km^{2}), of which 38.9 square miles (101 km^{2}) is land and 0.9 square miles (2.3 km^{2}) (2.14%) is water.

== Demographics ==
Historical population
| Census | Pop. | Note | %± |
|---|---|---|---|
| 1820 | 1,116 | | — |
| 1850 | 1,064 | | — |
| 1860 | 1,055 | | −0.8% |
| 1870 | 1,052 | | −0.3% |
| 1880 | 1,186 | | 12.7% |
| 1890 | 1,060 | | −10.6% |
| 1900 | 872 | | −17.7% |
| 1910 | 779 | | −10.7% |
| 1920 | 656 | | −15.8% |
| 1930 | 651 | | −0.8% |
| 1940 | 723 | | 11.1% |
| 1950 | 825 | | 14.1% |
| 1960 | 1,028 | | 24.6% |
| 1970 | 1,452 | | 41.2% |
| 1980 | 1,637 | | 12.7% |
| 1990 | 2,113 | | 29.1% |
| 2000 | 2,528 | | 19.6% |
| 2010 | 2,603 | | 3.0% |
| 2020 | 2,570 | | −1.3% |
U.S. Decennial Census

At the 2000 census there were 2,528 people, 952 households, and 702 families living in the town. The population density was 65.0 inhabitants per square mile (25.1/km^{2}). There were 1,091 housing units at an average density of 28.0 per square mile (10.8/km^{2}). The racial makeup of the town was 96.64% White, 0.55% African American, 0.99% Native American, 0.28% Asian, 0.40% from other races, and 1.15% from two or more races. Hispanic or Latino of any race were 1.19%. 13.2% were of English, 12.5% French Canadian, 11.5% Irish, 9.2% American, 8.9% French, 8.0% Polish, 7.6% Italian, 7.3% German and 5.6% Finnish ancestry according to Census 2000.

Of the 952 households 37.4% had children under the age of 18 living with them, 61.9% were married couples living together, 7.0% had a female householder with no husband present, and 26.2% were non-families. 19.0% of households were one person and 6.3% were one person aged 65 or older. The average household size was 2.66 and the average family size was 3.05.

The age distribution was 26.5% under the age of 18, 5.3% from 18 to 24, 36.9% from 25 to 44, 21.7% from 45 to 64, and 9.5% 65 or older. The median age was 36 years. For every 100 females, there were 104.2 males. For every 100 females age 18 and over, there were 105.6 males.

The median household income was $56,802 and the median family income was $61,618. Males had a median income of $42,647 versus $27,368 for females. The per capita income for the town was $23,707. About 3.0% of families and 4.9% of the population were below the poverty line, including 4.7% of those under age 18 and 10.3% of those age 65 or over.

== Education ==
There is only one school in the school district. Voluntown Elementary School offers grades pre-k through 8th and has offered full-day kindergarten since the 2008–2009 school year. The school also offers a program for three-year-old children. In-town high school students are given the option of attending one of three public schools: Griswold High School, Norwich Free Academy, or Wheeler High School in North Stonington. They are also given the choice of selecting a technical school: Norwich Tech or Ellis Tech. Students can also attend magnet schools - Quinebaug Middle College at Q.V.C.C. in Danielson, CT, and Marine Science Magnet High School in Groton, CT.
