= Route 197 (Connecticut–Massachusetts) =

Highway in Connecticut and Massachusetts

Route 197
- Route 197 highlighted in red

Route information
- Maintained by CTDOT
- Length: 14.17 mi (22.80 km) 10.97 miles (17.65 km) in CT; 3.20 miles (5.15 km) in MA
- Existed: 1932–present

Major junctions
- West end: Route 171 in Union, CT
- North end: Route 12 in Dudley, MA

Location
- Country: United States
- States: Connecticut, Massachusetts
- Counties: CT: Tolland, Windham, MA: Worcester

Highway system
- Connecticut State Highway System; Interstate; US; State; SSR; SR; Scenic
← Route 196	→ Route 198
← I-195	MA	→ Route 198

Route 197 is a 14.17-mile-long (22.80 km) state highway in northeastern Connecticut and southern Massachusetts, running from Union, Connecticut, to Dudley, Massachusetts. The Connecticut section is signed as an east–west route, while the Massachusetts section is signed north–south.

== Route description ==
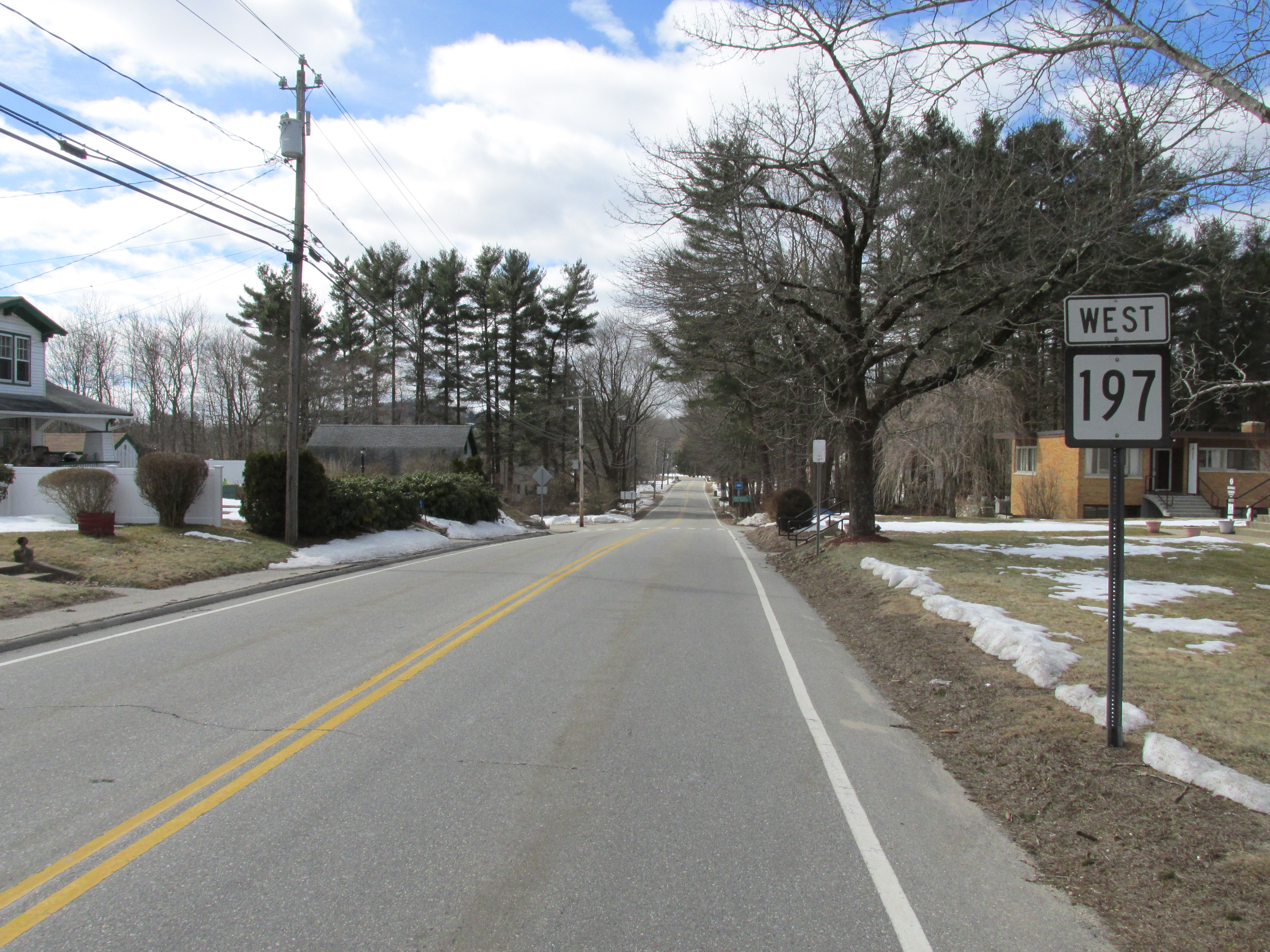
Route 197 westbound in Quinebaug, CT

Route 197 begins as Lawson Road at an intersection with Route 171 in southeastern Union. It heads east towards Woodstock, entering the town after 0.9 miles (1.4 km) and becoming Red White School Road. Route 197 travels east for about 6.3 miles (10.1 km) through rural northern Woodstock, becoming Old Turnpike Road after two miles (3 km) and curving southeast and then northeast across the town, and intersecting Route 198. Route 197 eventually reaches the village of North Woodstock, where it has a junction with Route 169. The road continues another three miles (5 km) to the Thompson town line. In Thompson, it soon crosses the Quinebaug River into the village of Quinebaug, intersecting with Route 131 in the village. Route 197 continues northeast another 0.3 miles (0.48 km) to an oblique crossing of the Massachusetts state line. The state line crossing is a short distance east of the southern terminus of Massachusetts Route 31. The two-lane highway heads northeast as Main Street through the town of Dudley and passes to the south of Nichols College. Route 197 passes to the south of Merino Lake before reaching its eastern terminus at a four-way intersection with Route 12 and Village Street. Route 12 heads south along Schofield Street toward Connecticut and east along Main Street across the French River into Webster.

== History ==
=== Connecticut ===
The Center Turnpike was chartered in May 1826 as a road from the center of Tolland to the village of Quinebaug via Westford, North Ashford, and North Woodstock. In 1922, a portion of the Center Turnpike was designated as State Highway 151, which began at New England Route 32, and followed Turnpike Road, Boston Hollow Road, Centre Pike, and Old Turnpike Road to the Massachusetts state line.

In the 1932 state highway renumbering, old Highway 151 was renumbered to Route 197, following the old Center Turnpike alignment. In 1941, the western end was truncated to a point in Ashford 1.34 miles (2.16 km) west of Route 89. In 1947, the western end was truncated to Route 169 in Woodstock. In 1962, Route 197 was extended west along its current alignment to its modern western terminus.

== Major intersections ==
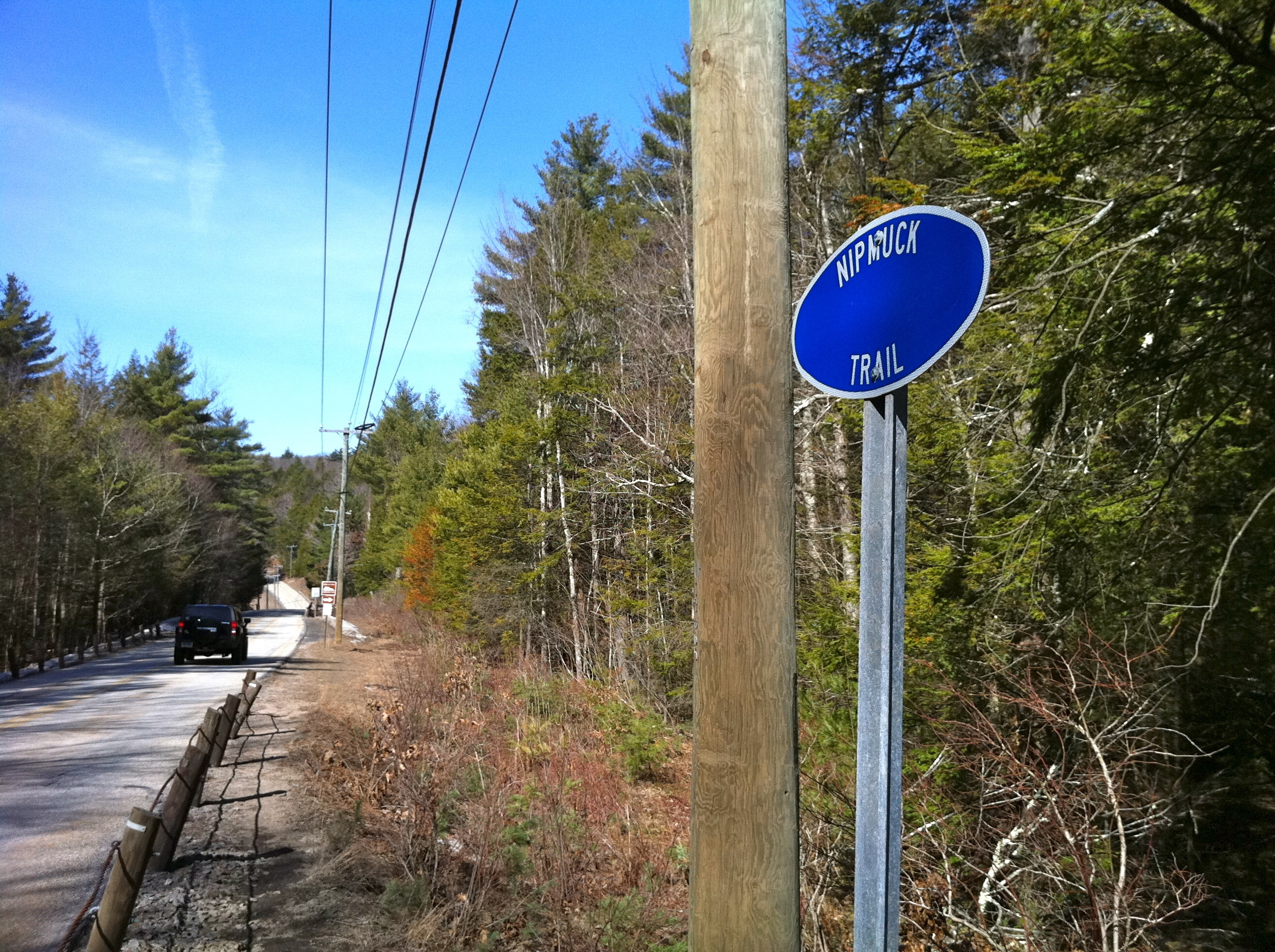
Nipmuck Trail sign on Route 197 near Bigelow Hollow State Park

State	County	Location	mi	km	Destinations	Notes
Connecticut	Tolland	Union	0.00	0.00	Route 171 to I-84 – Union, North Ashford	Western terminus
Connecticut	Windham	Woodstock	1.84	2.96	Route 198 – Eastford, Southbridge, MA	
Connecticut	Windham	Woodstock	7.20	11.59	Route 169 – Pomfret, Southbridge, MA	
Connecticut	Windham	Thompson	10.66	17.16	Route 131 – North Grosvenordale, Southbridge, MA	
Connecticut	Windham	Thompson	10.89	17.53	Route 31 north	Southern terminus of Route 31; access via Dresser Hill Road
Connecticut–Massachusetts state line			10.97 0.000	17.65 0.000	Route transition	
Massachusetts	Worcester	Dudley	3.200	5.150	Route 12 (Schofield Avenue) to Route 193 / Route 16 / I-395 – Webster, Worcester	Northern terminus
1.000 mi = 1.609 km; 1.000 km = 0.621 mi: Route transition
