= Connecticut Route 205 =

State highway in Windham County, Connecticut, US

Route 205
- Map of Windham County in northeastern Connecticut with Route 205 highlighted in red

Route information
- Maintained by CTDOT
- Length: 3.81 mi (6.13 km)
- Existed: 1932–present

Major junctions
- South end: Route 12 in Plainfield
- North end: Route 169 in Brooklyn

Location
- Country: United States
- State: Connecticut
- Counties: Windham

Highway system
- Connecticut State Highway System; Interstate; US; State; SSR; SR; Scenic
← Route 203	→ Route 207

Route 205 is a state highway in eastern Connecticut, running from the village of Wauregan in Plainfield to the town center of Brooklyn.

== Route description ==
Route 205 begins at an intersection with Route 12 in the village of Wauregan in the north western corner of the town of Plainfield. It heads northwest about 0.5 miles (0.80 km) across the Quinebaug River into the town of Brooklyn. In Brooklyn, it continues northwest through the southeastern part of town until its end at an intersection with Route 169 in the town center of Brooklyn. Route 205 is known as Wauregan Road for its entire length.

== History ==
In 1922, the road connecting the village of Wauregan and Brooklyn center was designated as a primary state highway known as Highway 144. Highway 144 was renumbered to Route 205 as part of the 1932 state highway renumbering. The route had no major changes since, other than a partial realignment in Brooklyn in 1999.

== Junction list ==
The entire route is in Windham County.

Location	mi	km	Destinations	Notes
Plainfield	0.00	0.00	Route 12 – Danielson, Plainfield	Southern terminus
Brooklyn	3.81	6.13	Route 169 – Pomfret, Canterbury	Northern terminus
1.000 mi = 1.609 km; 1.000 km = 0.621 mi
