= Connecticut Route 244 =

State highway in Windham County, Connecticut, US

Route 244
- Map of Windham County in northeastern Connecticut with Route 244 highlighted in red

Route information
- Maintained by CTDOT
- Length: 5.72 mi (9.21 km)
- Existed: 1988–present

Major junctions
- West end: Route 198 in Eastford
- East end: Route 97 in Pomfret

Location
- Country: United States
- State: Connecticut
- Counties: Windham

Highway system
- Connecticut State Highway System; Interstate; US; State; SSR; SR; Scenic
← Route 243	→ Route 254

Route 244 is a secondary state highway in rural Northeastern Connecticut. It connects the towns of Eastford (at Route 198) and Pomfret (at Route 97).

== Route description ==
Route 244 starts at an intersection with Route 198 in Eastford, Connecticut. It travels east, and intersects a minor road called Andert Drive. Known as The Boston Turnpike, it turns northeast before falling back on an eastward track. It intersects Taft Pond Road before passing near Nightingale Pond. Route 244 then intersects several minor roads before traveling parallel to the Vineyard Valley Golf Club as it intersects and ends at Route 97 in Pomfret Center. Northbound Route 97 serves as the continuation of the road towards U.S. Route 44 and Route 169.

The section of Route 244 from Ragged Hill Road in Pomfret to the eastern terminus is designated a scenic road.

== History ==
Route 244 was, at one time, part of the Middle Boston Post Road and was one of the principal roads connecting the city of Hartford in Connecticut to Boston in Massachusetts and Providence in Rhode Island. It was established as a private toll road known as the Boston Turnpike in 1797 and reverted to a public road in 1879. On February 1, 1988, the road changed from unsigned State Road 622 (which became a state road in 1962) to Route 244.

== Junction list ==
The entire route is in Windham County.

Location	mi	km	Destinations	Notes
Eastford	0.00	0.00	Route 198 to US 44 – Phoenixville, Eastford	Western terminus
Pomfret	5.72	9.21	Route 97 – Pomfret, Hampton	Eastern terminus
1.000 mi = 1.609 km; 1.000 km = 0.621 mi
