= Route 198 (Connecticut–Massachusetts) =

Highway in Connecticut and Massachusetts

Route 198
- Route 198 highlighted in red

Route information
- Maintained by ConnDOT and MassDOT
- Length: 23.18 mi (37.30 km) 19.22 miles (30.93 km) in CT; 3.96 miles (6.37 km) in MA
- Existed: 1932–present

Major junctions
- South end: US 6 in Chaplin, CT
- US 44 in Eastford, CT; Route 171 in Woodstock, CT
- North end: Route 131 in Southbridge, MA

Location
- Country: United States
- States: Connecticut, Massachusetts
- Counties: CT: Windham, MA: Worcester

Highway system
- Connecticut State Highway System; Interstate; US; State; SSR; SR; Scenic
← Route 197	→ Route 199
← Route 197	MA	→ US 202

Route 198 is a 23.18-mile-long (37.30 km) state highway in northeastern Connecticut and southern Massachusetts, running from Chaplin, Connecticut to Southbridge, Massachusetts.

== Route description ==
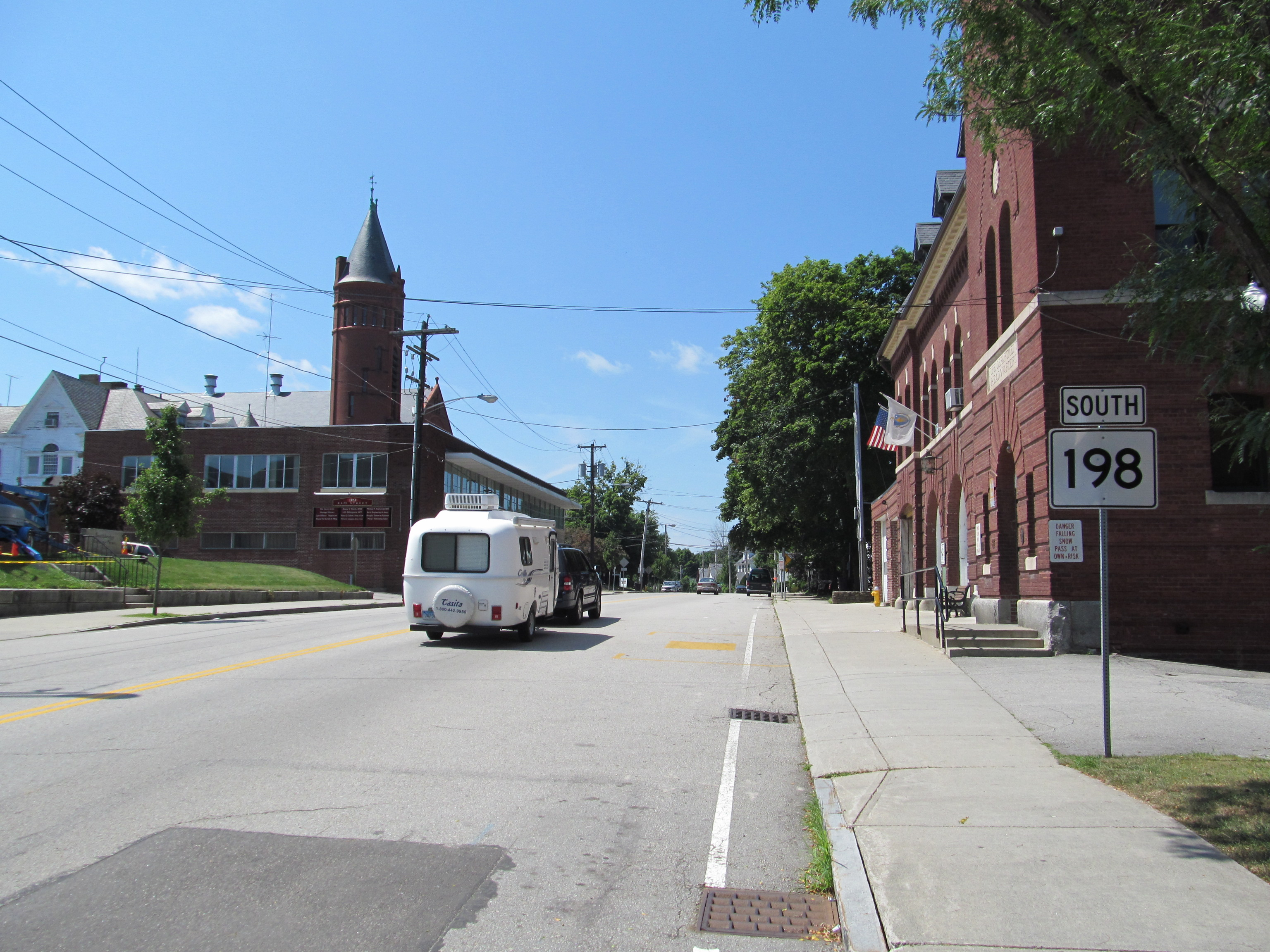
Looking southbound near its northern terminus in Southbridge, MA

Route 198 begins at an intersection with US 6 in Chaplin and heads north across the Natchaug River, then northeast parallel to the river into Eastford. In Eastford, it continues north, crossing US 44 and meeting the west end of Route 244 (an old alignment of US 44) in the center of town. It then enters the town of Woodstock, where it passes through the western part of town, briefly overlapping Route 171 and crossing Route 197 before continuing north to the Massachusetts state line. It continues along Eastford Road in the town of Southbridge. At the south end of the town center, Route 198 has an oblique intersection with Elm Street, and the state highway assumes that name to its northern terminus at Route 131 (Main Street) in the town center.

== History ==
Map of Worcester County, Massachusetts with Route 198 highlighted in red

=== Connecticut ===
In the 1920s, modern Route 198 belonged to different state highways. From US 6 to US 44, it was part of old Highway 101, and from US 44 to Route 171, it was part of old Highway 183. Route 198 was commissioned in 1932, running along the current route of Route 171 from former Route 15 (now I-84) in Union to former Route 91 (now Route 171) in Woodstock. Between 1932 and 1942, its western terminus was truncated at the Union-Eastford town line. Between 1947 and 1949, it was extended back to Route 15. Between 1952 and 1954, it was extended along the current route of Route 190 to the newly opened Route 15 freeway (now I-84). On January 1, 1959, with the decommissioning of Route 91, Route 198 was extended east to US 6. In 1963, Routes 171 and 198 were rerouted, with the northern terminus of Route 198 being moved to the state line. In 1998, the southern terminus was moved 0.05 miles (0.080 km) north with a rerouting of US 6.

== Major intersections ==
State	County	Location	mi	km	Destinations	Notes
Connecticut	Windham	Chaplin	0.00	0.00	US 6 – Willimantic, Killingly	Southern terminus
Connecticut	Windham	Eastford	8.17	13.15	US 44 – Mansfield, Putnam	
Connecticut	Windham	Eastford	8.96	14.42	Route 244 east – Pomfret	Western terminus of Route 244
Connecticut	Windham	Woodstock	11.92	19.18	Route 171 west – Union	Southern end of Route 171 concurrency
Connecticut	Windham	Woodstock	12.82	20.63	Route 171 east – South Woodstock	Northern end of Route 171 concurrency
Connecticut	Windham	Woodstock	15.95	25.67	Route 197 – Union, Webster, MA	
Connecticut–Massachusetts state line			19.22 0.000	30.93 0.000	Route transition	
Massachusetts	Worcester	Southbridge	3.960	6.373	Route 131 – Sturbridge, Springfield, Quinebaug, CT	Northern terminus
1.000 mi = 1.609 km; 1.000 km = 0.621 mi: Concurrency terminus; Route transition
