= Connecticut Route 12 =

State highway in Connecticut, US

Route 12
- Map of eastern Connecticut with Route 12 highlighted in red

Route information
- Maintained by CTDOT
- Length: 54.46 mi (87.64 km)
- Existed: 1922–present

Major junctions
- South end: I-95 / US 1 / Route 184 in Groton
- Route 2A in Preston; Route 2 in Norwich; I-395 in Lisbon; Route 14 in Central Village; US 6 in Danielson; I-395 / Route 101 in Dayville; US 44 in Putnam
- North end: Route 12 at the Massachusetts state line near North Grosvenordale

Location
- Country: United States
- State: Connecticut
- Counties: New London, Windham

Highway system
- Connecticut State Highway System; Interstate; US; State; SSR; SR; Scenic
← Route 11	→ Route 14
← Route 11	N.E.	→ Route 12A

Connecticut Route 12 is a state highway that runs from Groton north to the Massachusetts state line in Thompson.

== History ==
Route 12 was preceded by New England Interstate Route 12. The southern terminus of NE-12 was originally at New London, Connecticut. It travelled along present-day Route 32 (along the west bank of the Thames River) from New London to Norwich, Connecticut. In 1932, when Connecticut decommissioned its New England Routes, Route 12 swapped places with Route 32 south of Norwich. From Norwich to the Massachusetts border, Route 12 still follows its 1920s alignment.

== Route description ==
Route 12 from Groton to Norwich is a primary route, serving the Naval Submarine Base New London and is known as the U.S. Submarine Veterans Memorial Highway. North of Norwich, Route 12 is a minor road closely paralleling Interstate 395. Route 12 goes through the following towns: Groton, Ledyard, Preston, Norwich, Lisbon, Griswold, Canterbury (0.14 miles only), Plainfield, Killingly, Putnam, and Thompson.

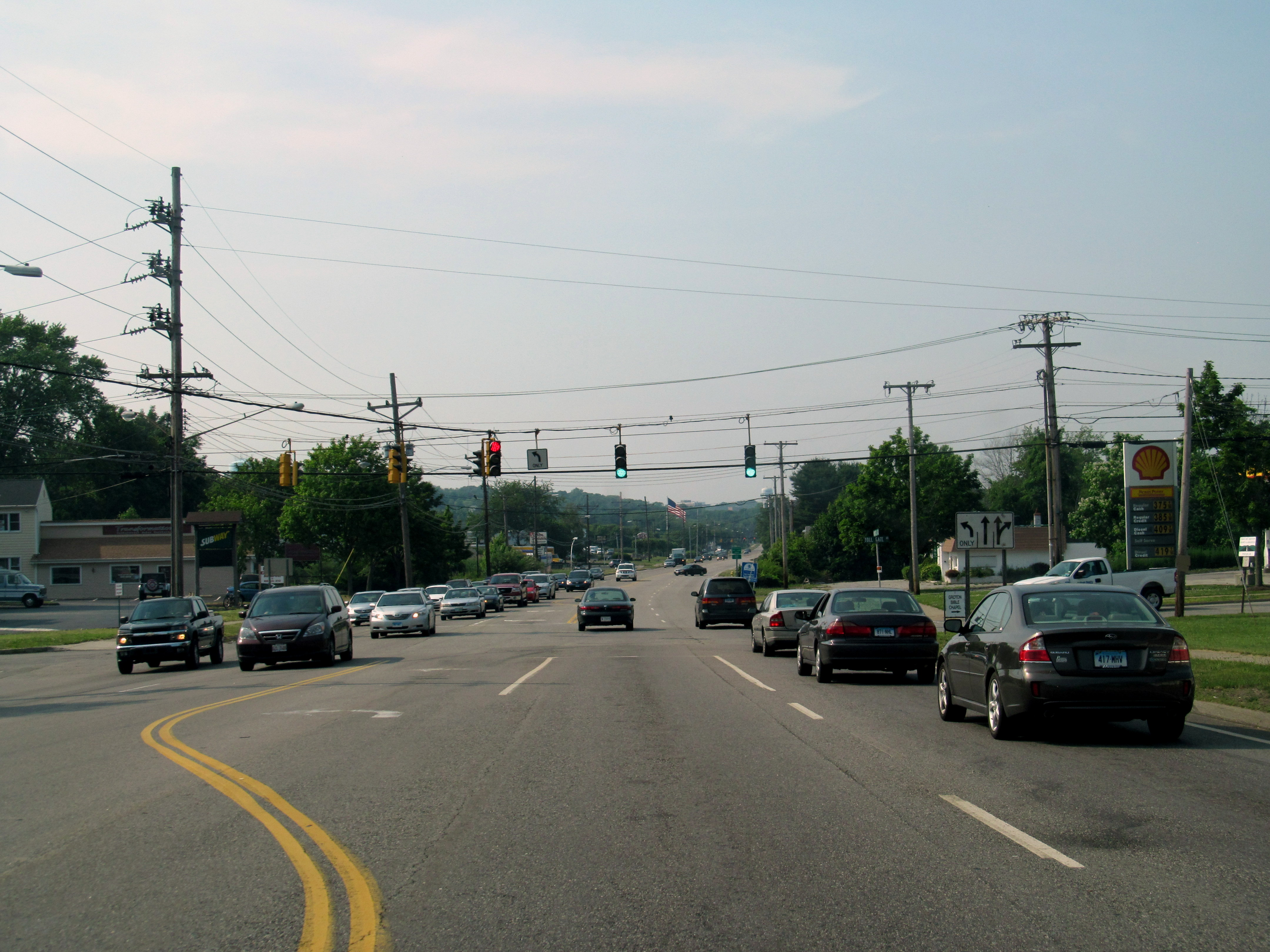
Route 12 in Groton near its southern end

== Junction list ==
County	Location	mi	km	Destinations	Notes
New London	Groton	0.0	0.0	US 1 north – Groton City	Continuation north; southern end of US 1 concurrency northbound
New London	Groton	0.22	0.35	I-95 south / US 1 south / Route 184 east – New London, Providence, Ledyard	Exit 95 on I-95; western terminus and exit 1 on Route 184; northern end of US 1 concurrency northbound
New London	Ledyard	6.86	11.04	Route 214 east – Ledyard	Western terminus of Route 214
New London	Preston	9.08	14.61	Route 2A west to I-395 – Uncasville	Southern end of Route 2A concurrency
New London	Preston	9.38	15.10	Route 2A east – Hallville	Northern end of Route 2A concurrency
New London	Norwich	12.12	19.51	Route 2 west to Route 32 – Hartford	Southern end of Route 2 concurrency
New London	Norwich	12.43	20.00	Route 2 east – Stonington	Northern end of Route 2 concurrency
New London	Norwich	15.19	24.45	Route 97 north – Taftville	Southern terminus of Route 97
New London	Lisbon	19.62	31.58	I-395 – Worcester, New Haven	Exits 21A-B on I-395; former Route 52
New London	Lisbon	20.43	32.88	Route 138 west – Newent	Southern end of Route 138 concurrency
New London	Griswold	20.82	33.51	Route 138 east – Pachaug	Northern end of Route 138 concurrency
New London	Griswold	21.05	33.88	Route 201 south – Hopeville Pond State Park	Northern terminus of Route 201
Windham	Canterbury	23.57	37.93	Butts Bridge Road (SR 668 west)	
Windham	Plainfield	26.60	42.81	To I-395	Access via SR 647
Windham	Plainfield	27.50	44.26	Route 14A west – Plainfield, Canterbury	Southern end of Route 14A concurrency
Windham	Plainfield	27.91	44.92	Route 14A east to I-395 – Sterling	Northern end of Route 14A concurrency
Windham	Plainfield	30.31	48.78	Route 14 east to I-395 – Moosup	Southern end of Route 14 concurrency
Windham	Plainfield	30.59	49.23	Route 14 west – Canterbury	Northern end of Route 14 concurrency
Windham	Plainfield	32.12	51.69	Route 205 north – Wauregan, Brooklyn	Southern terminus of Route 205
Windham	Killingly	36.15	58.18	US 6 east to I-395 – Providence	Southern end of US 6 concurrency
Windham	Killingly	36.51	58.76	US 6 west – Hartford	Northern end of US 6 concurrency
Windham	Killingly	37.19	59.85	To I-395	Access via SR 607
Windham	Killingly	39.46	63.50	I-395 / Route 101 – Dayville, East Killingly	Exit 41 on I-395
Windham	Killingly	42.04	67.66	Route 21 north – Putnam Heights	Southern terminus of Route 21
Windham	Putnam			I-395 – Thompson, Webster, MA	Access via Heritage Road; exit 46 on I-395; former Route 52
Windham	Putnam	45.58	73.35	US 44 west – Pomfret	Southern end of US 44 concurrency
Windham	Putnam	46.02	74.06	Route 171 west – Woodstock	Eastern terminus of Route 171
Windham	Putnam	46.22	74.38	US 44 east to I-395 – East Putnam	Northern end of US 44 concurrency
Windham	Thompson	48.17	77.52	Route 193 north – Webster, MA	Southern terminus of Route 193
Windham	Thompson	48.88	78.66	I-395 south – Norwich, New Haven	Exit 49 on I-395; former Route 52
Windham	Thompson	49.88	80.27	Route 200 east – Thompson	Western terminus of Route 200
Windham	Thompson	51.95	83.61	Route 131 west – Quinebaug, Southbridge, MA	Eastern terminus of Route 131
Windham	Thompson	54.46	87.64	Route 12 north – Auburn, Worcester	Continuation into Massachusetts
1.000 mi = 1.609 km; 1.000 km = 0.621 mi
