= Route 131 (Connecticut–Massachusetts) =

Highway in Connecticut and Massachusetts

Route 131
- Map of southern Massachusetts with MA 131 highlighted in solid red and of northeastern Connecticut with CT 131 highlighted in dotted red

Route information
- Maintained by CTDOT
- Length: 13.55 mi (21.81 km) Connecticut: 3.78 mi Massachusetts: 9.77 mi
- Existed: 1923 (extended into Connecticut 1932)–present

Major junctions
- West end: US 20 in Sturbridge, MA
- East end: Route 12 in Thompson, CT

Location
- Country: United States
- States: Connecticut, Massachusetts
- Counties: MA: Worcester; CT: Windham

Highway system
- Connecticut State Highway System; Interstate; US; State; SSR; SR; Scenic
- Massachusetts State Highway System; Interstate; US; State
- Connecticut State Highway System; Interstate; US; State; SSR; SR; Scenic
← Route 130	MA	→ Route 132
← Route 130	CT	→ Route 132

Route 131 is a 13.55-mile-long (21.81 km) state highway in the U.S. states of Massachusetts and Connecticut. It serves the southwestern portion of the Worcester metropolitan area. It begins at Route 12 in the North Grosvenordale section of the town of Thompson in Connecticut and ends at U.S. Route 20 in the center of Sturbridge in Massachusetts.

== Route description ==
Route 131 begins at U.S. Route 20 in Sturbridge, just west of where that route meets Interstate 84, and just south of I-84's terminus with Interstate 90. After crossing under I-84, Route 131 meets the former northern end of Route 15, which was a continuation of Connecticut Route 15. Route 131 continues southeastward into Southbridge, where it crosses the Quinebaug River. In downtown Southbridge, Route 131 meets the northern end of Route 198 before becoming concurrent with Route 169 for half a mile, south of the Southbridge Industrial Park and the old American Optical Company plant.

After leaving its concurrency with Route 169, Route 131 makes a quick right and left turn as it crosses the Quinebaug once more, before heading into the town of Dudley. The route heads southeastward through the West Dudley section of town, crossing the Quinebaug once more before crossing the Connecticut state line into the Quinebaug section of Thompson. Once in Quinebaug, Route 131 intersects Route 197 before continuing towards North Grosvenordale, passing Walker Road, which continues into Massachusetts as Massachusetts Route 31. Route 131 continues southeastward until finally ending at Route 12 next to the French River.

== History ==
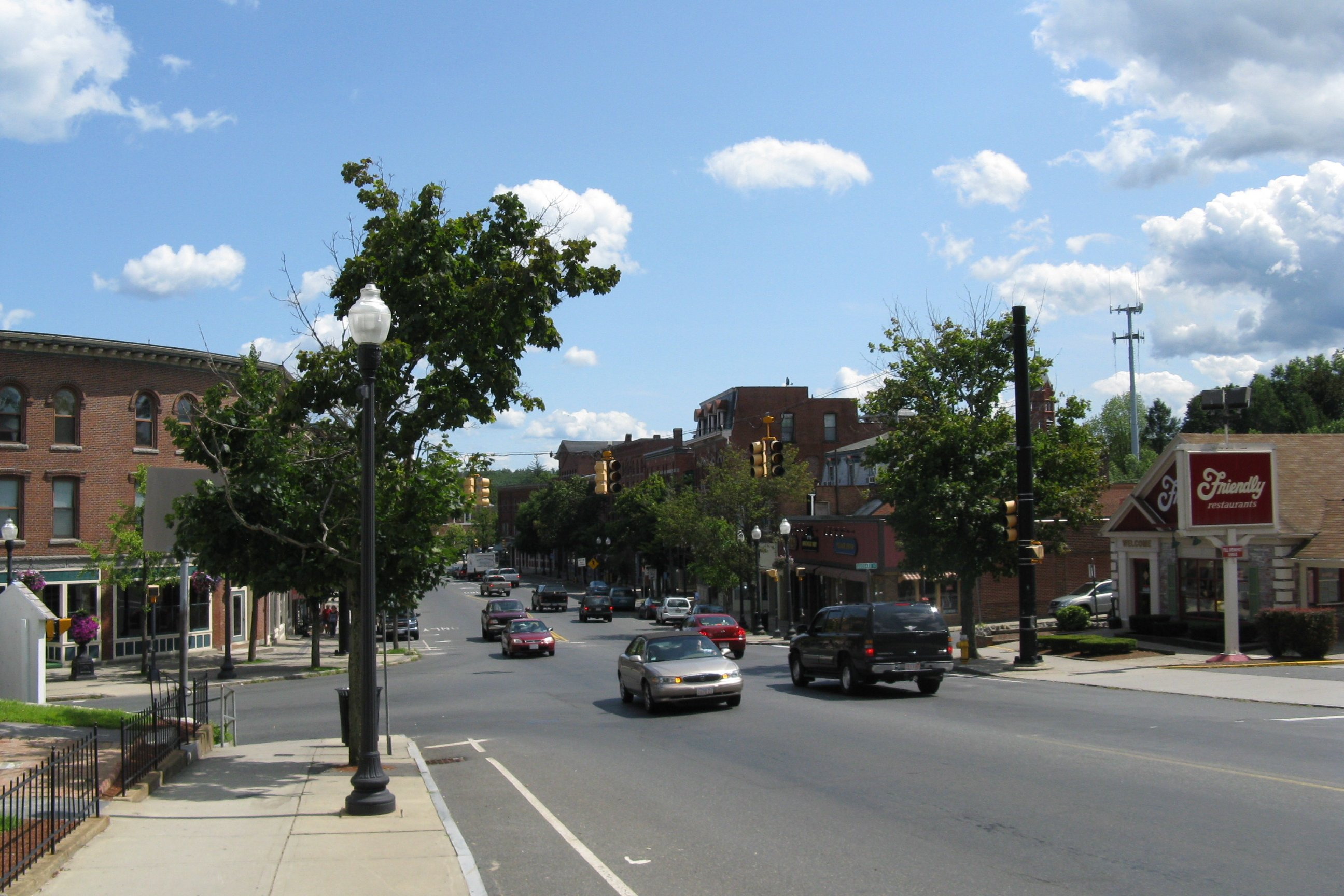
Route 131 eastbound in Southbridge

In October 1803, the Thompson Turnpike Company was chartered to improve and maintain the highway between the Rhode Island state line in West Glocester to the Massachusetts line in Quinebaug. The toll road was established as part of a direct route from Providence to Springfield. At the Rhode Island line, the road continued east as the West Glocester Turnpike (modern U.S. Route 44). At the Massachusetts line, the road did not continue as a turnpike, and the route to Springfield was over public roads. The Thompson Turnpike used Elmwood Hill Road, Quaddick Road, Thompson Hill Road, Buckley Hill Road, and Quinebaug Road. It went through the village of Quaddick, Thompson center, North Grosvenordale, and Quinebaug.

In 1923, the southern New England states began numbering their main highways, most of which had, by the time, been under state control. Massachusetts had numbered the continuation of the Thompson Turnpike as Highway 131, but the designation did not continue into Connecticut at that time. In Connecticut, the middle portion of the former Thompson Turnpike, between Thompson center and North Grosvenordale, had become part of Highway 185. The southern and northern sections remained unnumbered. In the 1932 state highway renumbering, the southern portion and part of the middle portion (Thompson Hill Road) became a section of Route 200. The northern portion was designated as SR 874, an unsigned state road. At the same time, a Route 131 was also created in Roxbury. This Route 131 was then renumbered in 1935 to Route 199, and the number 131 was then assigned to SR 874 (Quinebaug Road) to match the existing route number in Massachusetts.

== Major intersections ==
State	County	Location	mi	km	Destinations	Notes
Massachusetts	Worcester	Sturbridge	0.00	0.00	US 20 to I-84 / I-90 / Route 49 / Mass Pike – Brimfield, Charlton, Palmer	Western terminus
Massachusetts	Worcester	Southbridge	4.00	6.44	Route 198 south – Woodstock Valley, CT, Eastford, CT	Northern terminus of Route 198
Massachusetts	Worcester	Southbridge	4.52	7.27	Route 169 north – Charlton	Western end of Route 169 concurrency
Massachusetts	Worcester	Southbridge	5.05	8.13	Route 169 south – Woodstock, CT	Eastern end of Route 169 concurrency
Connecticut–Massachusetts state line			9.77 3.78	15.72 6.08	Route transition	
Connecticut	Windham	Thompson	3.53	5.68	Route 197 – Woodstock, Webster, MA	
Connecticut	Windham	Thompson	0.00	0.00	Route 12 – Wilsonville, Grosvenordale	Eastern terminus
1.000 mi = 1.609 km; 1.000 km = 0.621 mi: Closed/former; Concurrency terminus; Route transition
