= Route 169 (Connecticut–Massachusetts) =

Highway in Connecticut and Massachusetts, United States

Route 169
- Map of eastern Connecticut with CT 169 highlighted in solid red and of southern Massachusetts with MA 169 highlighted in dotted red

Route information
- Maintained by ConnDOT and MassDOT
- Length: 47.36 mi (76.22 km): Connecticut: 38.25 mi (61.56 km); Massachusetts: 9.11 mi (14.66 km)
- Existed: January 1, 1959–present
- History: Created in 1932 as Route 93
- Tourist routes: Connecticut State Route 169

Major junctions
- South end: Route 2 / Route 32 in Norwich, CT
- I-395 in Lisbon, CT; US 6 in Brooklyn, CT; US 44 in Pomfret, CT; Route 171 in Woodstock, CT
- North end: US 20 in Charlton, MA

Location
- Country: United States
- States: Connecticut, Massachusetts
- Counties: Connecticut: New London; Windham; Massachusetts Worcester

Highway system
- Connecticut State Highway System; Interstate; US; State; SSR; SR; Scenic
← Route 168	→ Route 171
← Route 168	MA	→ Route 177
← I-91	CT 93	→ Route 94
← I-93		→ I-95

Route 169 is a 47.36-mile-long (76.22 km) state highway in Connecticut and Massachusetts, United States. It begins in the city of Norwich, Connecticut, and runs 38 miles (61 km) through Northeastern Connecticut, continuing across the state border into Southbridge, Massachusetts. The route ends in Charlton after another nine miles (14 km). A portion of the route in the town center of Pomfret is on the National Register of Historic Places as Pomfret Street Historic District, and 32.10 miles (51.66 km) of the road is designated as the Connecticut State Route 169 National Scenic Byway.

== Route description ==
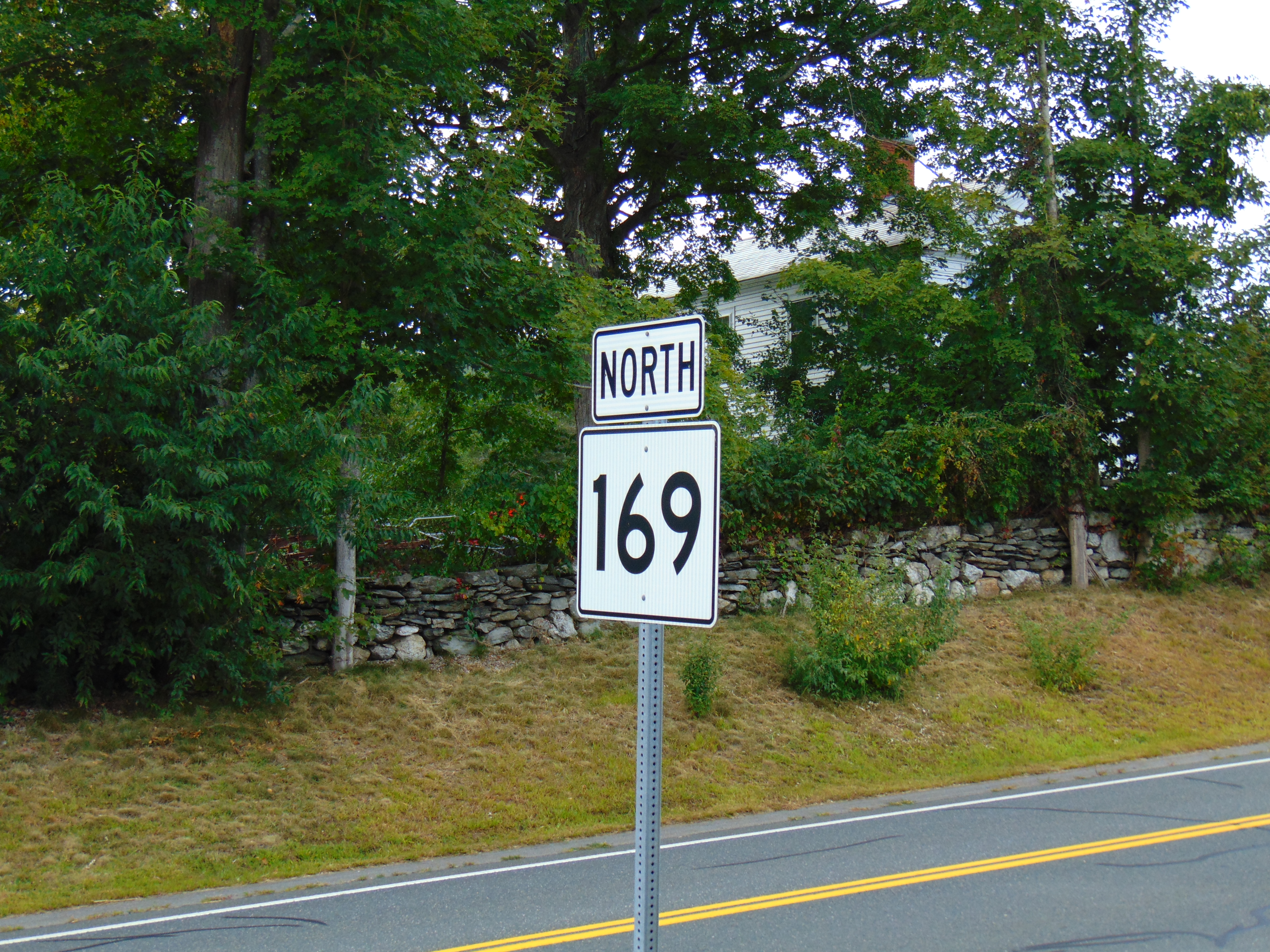
A reassurance sign in Southbridge, Massachusetts

Route 169 begins at an intersection with Route 2 and Route 32 in Norwich and heads northeast to the Taftville section of Norwich, where it briefly overlaps Route 97 and turns south before crossing the Shetucket River into Lisbon. In Lisbon, Route 169 continues generally northeast, intersecting I-395 before continuing into Canterbury. In Canterbury, Route 169 continues north, generally parallel to the Quinebaug River although not actually along it, before crossing into Brooklyn. In Brooklyn, it continues north, bisecting the town, before crossing into Pomfret. In Pomfret, it continues north, overlapping US 44 through the center of town, before continuing north into Woodstock. In Woodstock, it continues north past the Woodstock Airport, briefly overlapping Route 171, before heading generally northwest to the Massachusetts state line.

In Massachusetts, Route 169 is an undivided two-lane highway through the towns of Southbridge and Charlton. It begins as North Woodstock Road, briefly overlaps Route 131 as part of East Main Street, then splits north on Mechanic Street at the American Optical rotary, bypassing Southbridge center. At the north end of Mechanic Street, the highway follows Worcester Street north to the Charlton town line, where it changes its name to Southbridge Road. It ends at U.S. Route 20 in Charlton City, a village in Charlton.

A 32.10-mile (51.66 km) stretch of Route 169, running from Rocky Hollow Road in Lisbon to the Massachusetts state line, is a designated National Scenic Byway and state scenic road known for its vibrant autumn foliage and historic communities. The entire route within Connecticut is also designated the General Israel Putnam Highway. The portion of Route 169 in Pomfret Center between Bradley Road and Woodstock Road is a historic district known as the Pomfret Street Historic District.

== History ==
The Norwich and Woodstock Turnpike was a private toll road incorporated in 1801 connecting the city of Norwich to the town center of Woodstock. The corporation was dissolved in 1846. The turnpike left Norwich using Canterbury Turnpike, crossing the Shetucket River at Occum and continuing northeast on Kinsman Hill Road to Route 169. The turnpike then followed Route 169 all the way to Woodstock and the Massachusetts state line. In 1923, state routes were first designated in Connecticut and Massachusetts. The route from downtown Norwich to Taftville and Baltic along Harland Road and modern Route 97 was designated as State Highway 187. A loop route of New England Route 12 between Taftville and Jewett City via the village of Newent (partly along modern Route 138) was designated as State Highway 356. In northeastern Connecticut, the route from Putnam to Woodstock and beyond to the Massachusetts state line (partly along modern Route 171) was assigned State Highway 142. In Massachusetts, the road from Southbridge center via Charlton along modern Route 169, then to West Auburn along modern US 20, was assigned as State Highway 124. By 1931, Highway 124 was relocated along roughly modern I-84 from the Connecticut state line in Holland via Sturbridge center to Charlton, then continuing along its original route to West Auburn. The former alignment of Highway 124 was redesignated as Highway 124A.

Route 93
- Location: Norwich–Newent
- Existed: 1932–January 1, 1959

In 1932, most of the turnpike route was renumbered as Route 93 as part of a major statewide renumbering of roads. Portions of old Highways 187 (Norwich-Taftville) and 356 (Taftville-Newent) were utilized for the new Route 93. At the same time, Massachusetts renumbered Highway 124A as Route 93 to maintain number continuity across the state line. On January 1, 1959, Route 93 was renumbered to Route 169 in both Connecticut and Massachusetts because the route number was to be used for I-93.

In April 1991, the Connecticut Department of Transportation (ConnDOT) designated Route 169 as a Connecticut Scenic Road. This designation ran between Lisbon and the Massachusetts state line in Woodstock. Two years later, the highway was named to the country’s top 10 scenic byways by Scenic America. The highway was then designated a National Scenic Byway in September 1996.

== Junction list ==
State	County	Location	mi	km	Destinations	Notes
Connecticut	New London	Norwich	0.00	0.00	Route 2 / Route 32 – Preston, Mohegan, Colchester, Franklin	Southern terminus
Connecticut	New London	Norwich	2.88	4.63	Route 97 north – Baltic	Southern end of Route 97 concurrency
Connecticut	New London	Norwich	3.19	5.13	Route 97 south – Downtown Norwich	Northern end of Route 97 concurrency
Connecticut	New London	Lisbon	5.36	8.63	I-395 south – Norwich	Exit 19 on I-395; former Route 52
Connecticut	New London	Lisbon	6.46	10.40	Route 138 – Jewett City, Baltic	
Connecticut	New London	Lisbon	7.65	12.31	Kinsman Hill Road (SR 600 west)	
Connecticut	Windham	Canterbury	10.59	17.04	Butts Bridge Road (SR 668 east)	
Connecticut	Windham	Canterbury	14.07	22.64	Route 14 – Scotland, Moosup	
Connecticut	Windham	Brooklyn	20.31	32.69	Route 205 south – Wauregan	Northern terminus of Route 205
Connecticut	Windham	Brooklyn	20.59	33.14	US 6 – Danielson, Willimantic	
Connecticut	Windham	Pomfret	25.50	41.04	Route 101 – Dayville	
Connecticut	Windham	Pomfret	26.77	43.08	US 44 west – Mansfield	Southern end of US 44 concurrency
Connecticut	Windham	Pomfret	28.33	45.59	US 44 east / Route 97 south – Putnam, Hampton	Northern end of US 44 concurrency; northern terminus of Route 97
Connecticut	Windham	Woodstock	30.54	49.15	Route 171 east – Putnam	Southern end of Route 171 concurrency
Connecticut	Windham	Woodstock	31.32	50.40	Route 171 west – Union	Northern end of Route 171 concurrency
Connecticut	Windham	Woodstock	35.71	57.47	Route 197 – Quinebaug, Union	
Connecticut–Massachusetts state line			38.25 0.00	61.56 0.00	Route transition	
Massachusetts	Worcester	Southbridge	3.81	6.13	Route 131 – Sturbridge, North Grosvenordale	
Massachusetts	Worcester	Charlton	9.11	14.66	US 20 – Sturbridge, Auburn	Northern terminus
1.000 mi = 1.609 km; 1.000 km = 0.621 mi: Concurrency terminus; Route transition
