= Centre Village Historic District =

Historic district in Massachusetts, United States

- U.S. National Register of Historic Places
- U.S. Historic district
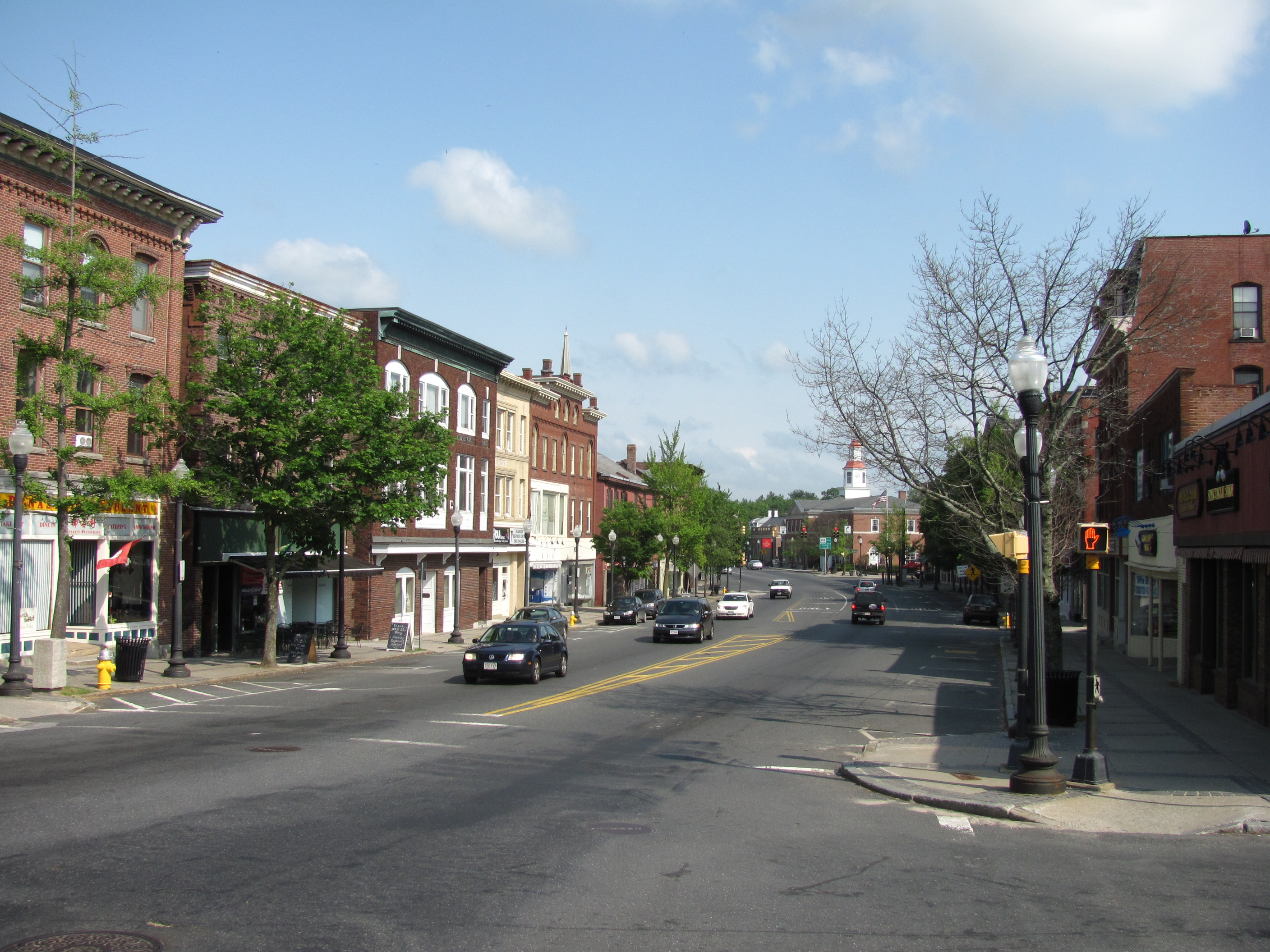
- Main Street

- Location within Massachusetts Location within the United States
- Location: Along Main St., Southbridge, Massachusetts
- Coordinates: 42°4′32″N 72°2′4″W
- Area: 24 acres (9.7 ha)
- Architect: Multiple
- Architectural style: Mid 19th Century Revival , Late 19th And 20th Century Revivals , Late Victorian
- NRHP reference No.: 79000379
- Added to NRHP: September 07, 1979

The Centre Village Historic District encompasses the historic central business district of Southbridge, Massachusetts. The district includes properties on Main Street, roughly between Elm and Goddard Streets. The central area represents a fairly well preserved Late Victorian commercial center. It was added to the National Register of Historic Places in 1979.

== Description and history ==
The area that is now the city of Southbridge was settled in 1713, and was incorporated out of portions of Sturbridge and Charlton in 1816. Its center was long a civic meeting space, with a meeting house at the site of the present Central Baptist Church, and the adjacent cemetery. Its industrial development also began early, with sawmills and gristmills on the banks of the Quinebaug River. In the 19th century, the city experienced rapid growth, as the waters of the river were harnessed for the manufacture of textiles and optical equipment. Main Street (now Massachusetts Route 131) developed as both a commercial center, and as the place were the city's business leaders built their homes. The result is a central commercial area with commercial architecture dating from the 1840s to the 1910s, along with a series of high-quality homes of the same period.

The historic district extends along Main Street for about 0.4 miles (0.64 km), from Hamilton Street in the west to Coombs Street in the east. Anchoring the east end of the district is the 1810s house of Ebenezer Ammidown, whose family one of the leading forces in the creation of both the city's mills and its downtown. The house now serves as a local cultural center. Prominent at the western end of the district is the former Universalist Church, a Greek Revival structure built about 1840. Commercial buildings lining Main Street in between date mainly from 1840 to 1900, and are a combination of wood-frame and brick buildings in a diversity of styles. Prominent civic buildings include the Jacob Edwards Library, a fine Georgian Revival building built in 1914 to a design by Chicago architect Daniel Burnham.

== See also ==
- National Register of Historic Places listings in Southbridge, Massachusetts
- National Register of Historic Places listings in Worcester County, Massachusetts
