= March Route of Rochambeau's Army: Manship Road-Barstow Road =

- U.S. National Register of Historic Places
- U.S. Historic district
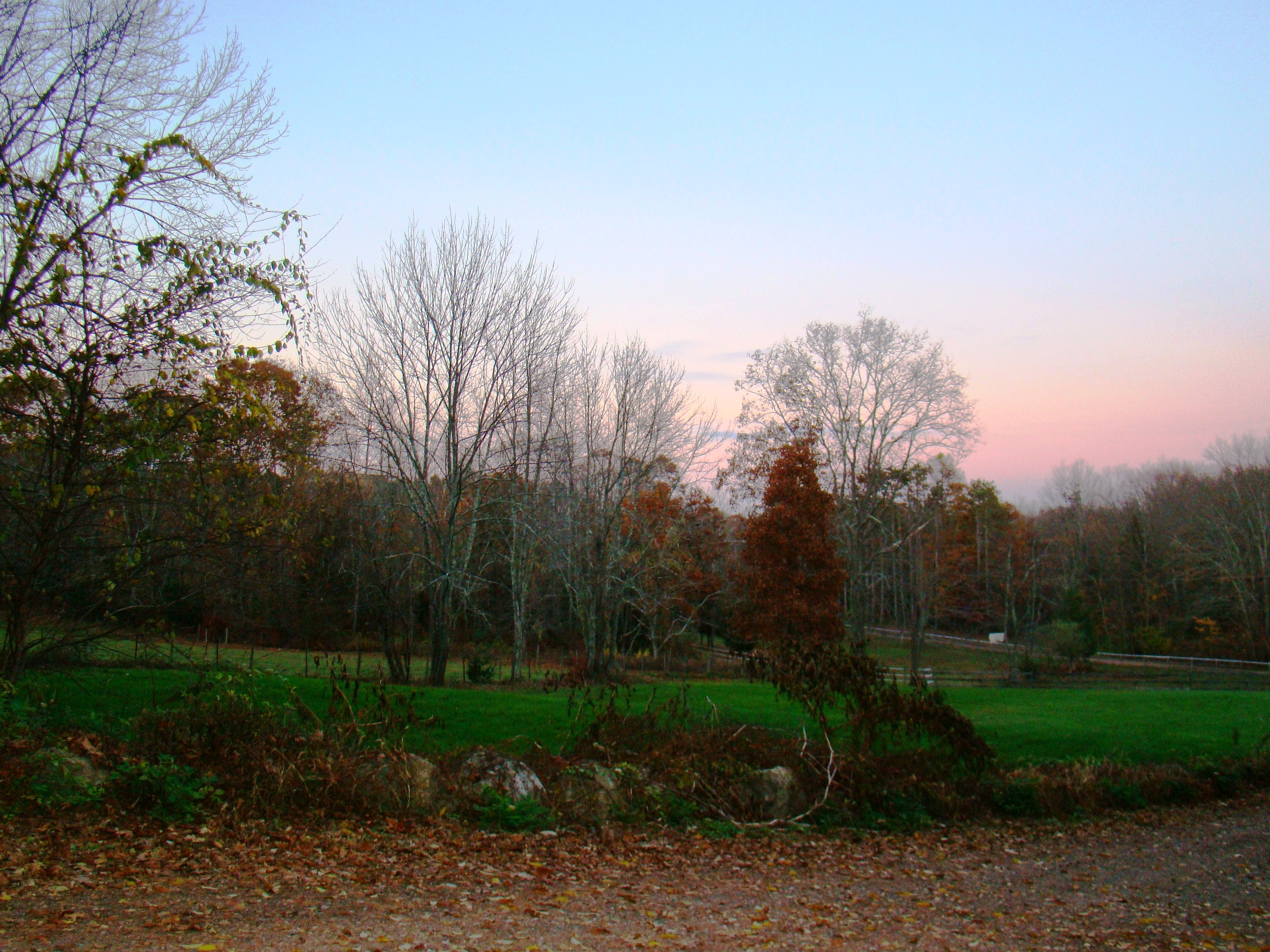
- Manship Road and stone wall, in 2016

- Location within Connecticut Location within the United States
- Location: Manship Road, Barstow Road from Junction with Manship Road to Westminster Road, Canterbury, Connecticut
- Coordinates: 41°42′7″N 72°0′13″W
- Area: 2 acres (0.81 ha)
- MPS: Rochambeau's Army in Connecticut, 1780-1782 MPS
- NRHP reference No.: 02001678

Significant dates
- Dates of significance: 1781, 1782
- Added to NRHP: January 8, 2003

March Route of Rochambeau's Army: Manship Road-Barstow Road is a historic site in Canterbury, Connecticut that was listed on the National Register of Historic Places in 2003, for its evocation of the march route French commander Rochambeau's troops in 1781 and in 1782.

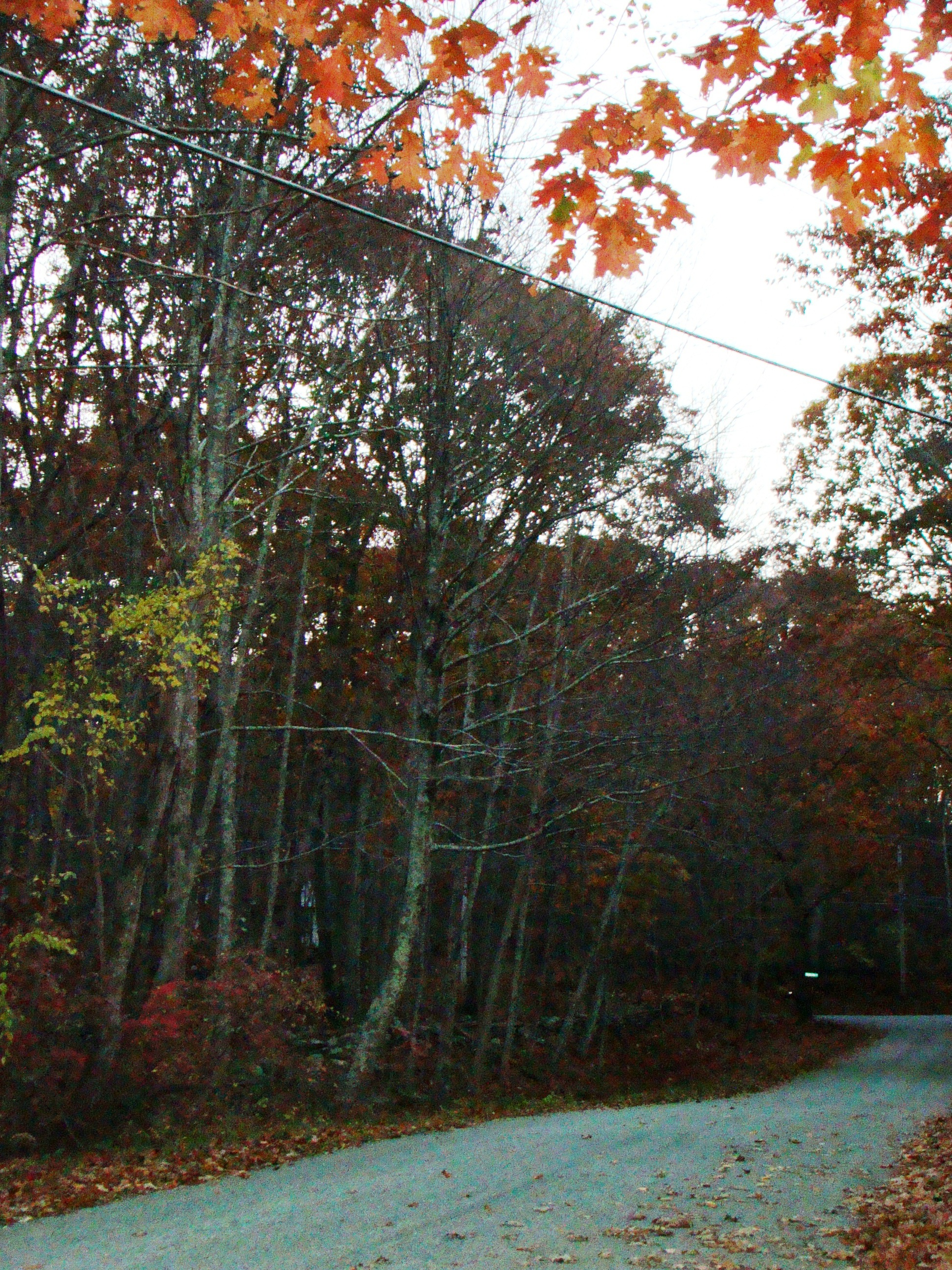
Barstow Road, towards Canturbury Road, in 2016

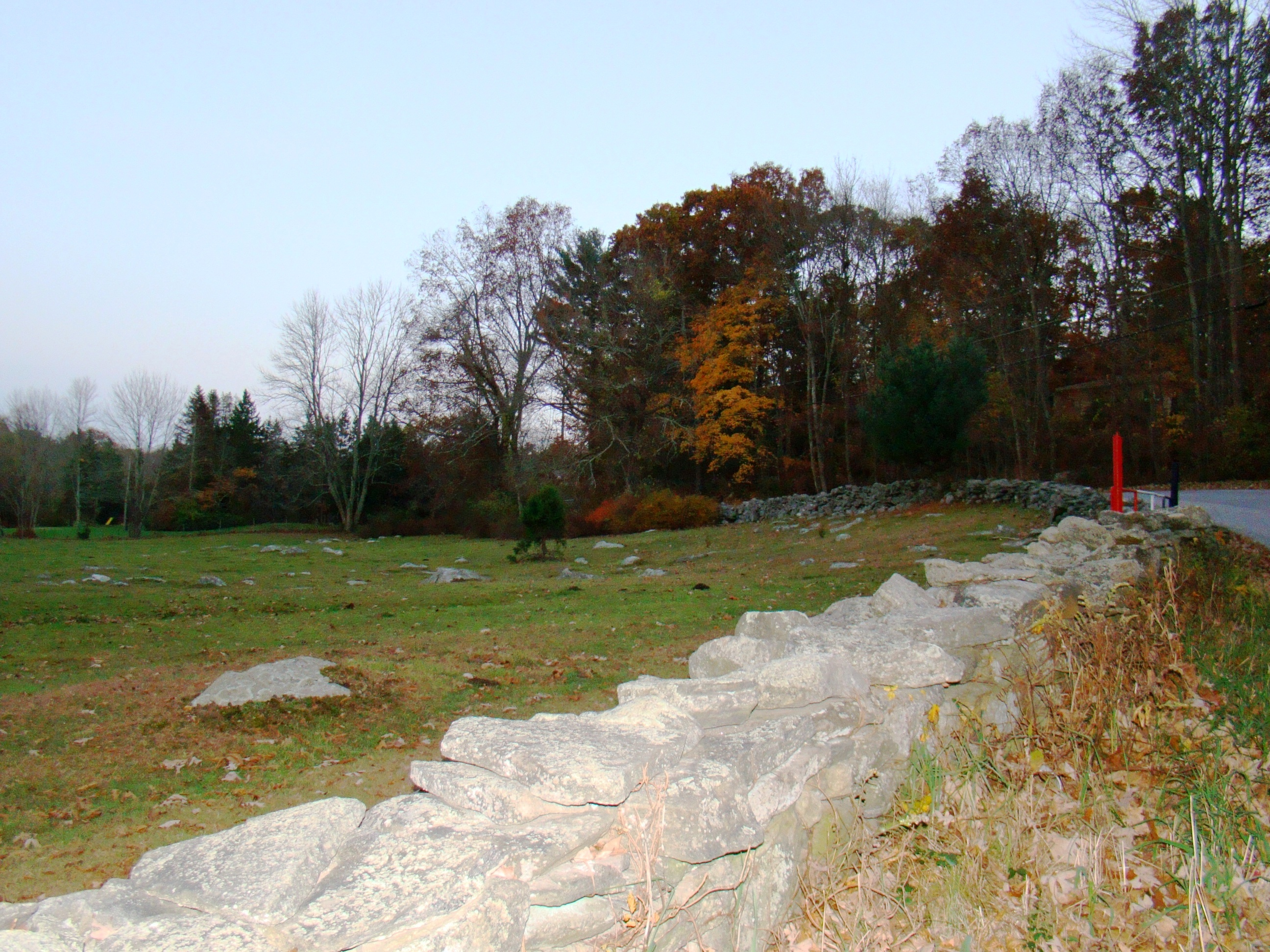
Stone walls at junction of Manship and Barstow roads, in 2016

It is significant as a preserved section of the march route which, in this area, is followed by what is now Connecticut Route 14. This section, however, is a bypassed loop of road, cut off by a road realignment in the 1930s, and therefore without traffic and not modernized. The section is approximately 1,400 feet of bypassed loop of road, on the north side of the main road, along Manship Road and Barstow Road, starting from a junction of the loop with Manship Road and running to Westminster Road. It is paved road about 20 feet wide, plus a margin to stone walls lining the road. The designated area is about 50 to 55 feet wide, extending to the walls. The National Register nomination of 2001 includes six photos of narrow roadway, stone walls, and the one house along this section. The house is itself historical, dating from about the 1840s, and adds rather than detracts from the historical feel.

Rochambeau's troops marched through here in June, 1781, and found the road along this general area to be the most difficult along their whole journey. Although the road has been paved, the visual appearance is still evocative of passage of troops.

Other preserved sections of the route nearby include March Route of Rochambeau's Army: Old Canterbury Road (about 2 miles (3.2 km) to the east, along Route 14 through Canterbury then straight on 14A, Canterbury Road) and March Route of Rochambeau's Army: Palmer Road (an approximately 2,000-foot (610 m) stretch about 3 miles (4.8 km) to the west along Route 14).

Multiple other properties whose association with Rochambeau's route is known were also considered for listing on the National Register in a 2001 study.

== See also ==
- March Route of Rochambeau's army
- List of historic sites preserved along Rochambeau's route
