= Ashland Mill Tenement =

- U.S. National Register of Historic Places
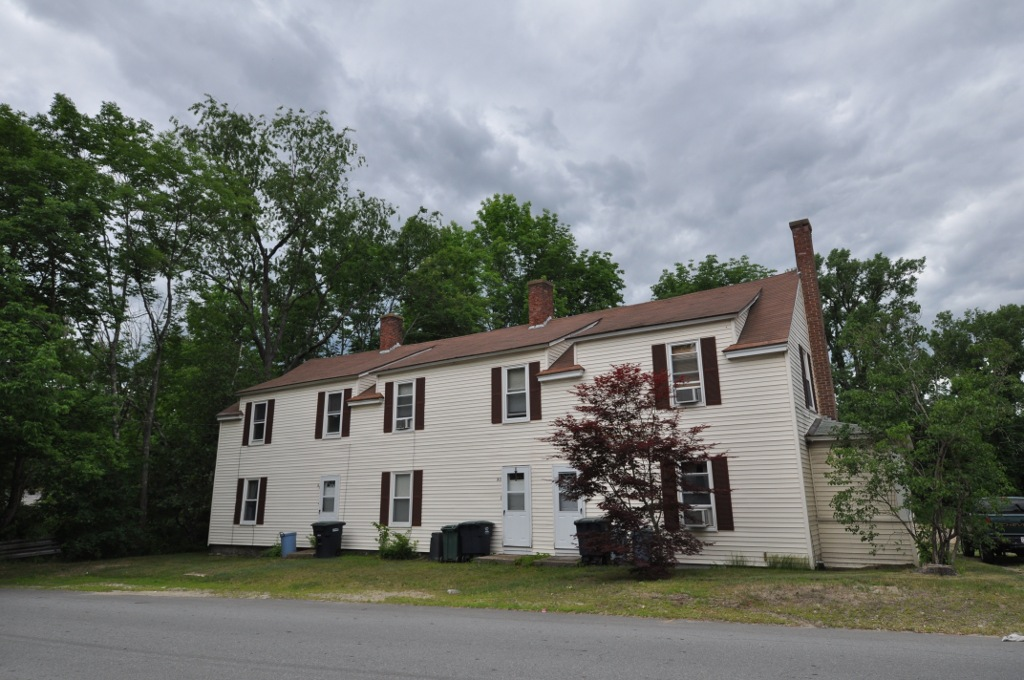

- Location within Massachusetts Location within the United States
- Location: 141-145 Ashland Ave., Southbridge, Massachusetts
- Coordinates: 42°3′55″N 72°0′37″W
- Area: less than one acre
- Built: 1835
- Architectural style: Utilitarian
- MPS: Southbridge MRA
- NRHP reference No.: 89000545
- Added to NRHP: June 22, 1989

The Ashland Mill Tenement is a historic tenement at 141-145 Ashland Avenue in Southbridge, Massachusetts. Built about 1835, this unassuming rowhouse is one of the oldest documented factory-related buildings in the city. It was listed on the National Register of Historic Places in 1989.

== Description and history ==
The Ashland Mill Tenement is located east of downtown Southbridge, at the junction of Ashland Avenue and Sandersdale Road (Massachusetts Route 131). It is an architecturally unassuming two story wood-frame construction, with a gable roof and clapboarded exterior. It has three units of housing, arrayed townhouse-style; the south side of each unit is two bays wide, with a sash window and simply framed entry on the first floor, and a brick chimney on one side. A shed-roof dormer (apparently original to the building construction) provides additional space on the second floor to each unit. The north side facades have porches sheltering the unit entrances.

The earliest known industrial use in the area of this building was a blacksmithy, which was operating in 1815. A cotton mill was established on nearby Lebanon Brook in 1834, and this tenement was probably soon afterward. It was apparently one of three such tenements built for the mill workers, and is the only surviving structure of that enterprise. In 1874, a printing operation was established on the brook, with this building probably providing housing for that business's workers.

The first known examples of housing built for mill workers in Southbridge were built about 1815, but neither the buildings nor descriptions of them have survived. The only factory housing of similar vintage in Southbridge are brick buildings built c. 1837 for the Hamilton Woolen Mill, which has more elaborate Greek Revival styling.

== See also ==
- National Register of Historic Places listings in Southbridge, Massachusetts
- National Register of Historic Places listings in Worcester County, Massachusetts
