= Connecticut Route 97 =

State highway in eastern Connecticut, US

Route 97
- Map of eastern Connecticut with Route 97 highlighted in red

Route information
- Maintained by CTDOT
- Length: 29.14 mi (46.90 km)
- Existed: 1932–present

Major junctions
- South end: Route 12 in Norwich
- I-395 in Occum; US 6 in Hampton; US 44 in Abington
- North end: US 44 / Route 169 in Pomfret

Location
- Country: United States
- State: Connecticut
- Counties: New London, Windham

Highway system
- Connecticut State Highway System; Interstate; US; State; SSR; SR; Scenic
← I-95	→ Route 99

Route 97 is a north–south state highway in eastern Connecticut running for 29.14 miles (46.90 km) from Route 12 in Norwich to US 44 in Pomfret.

== Route description ==
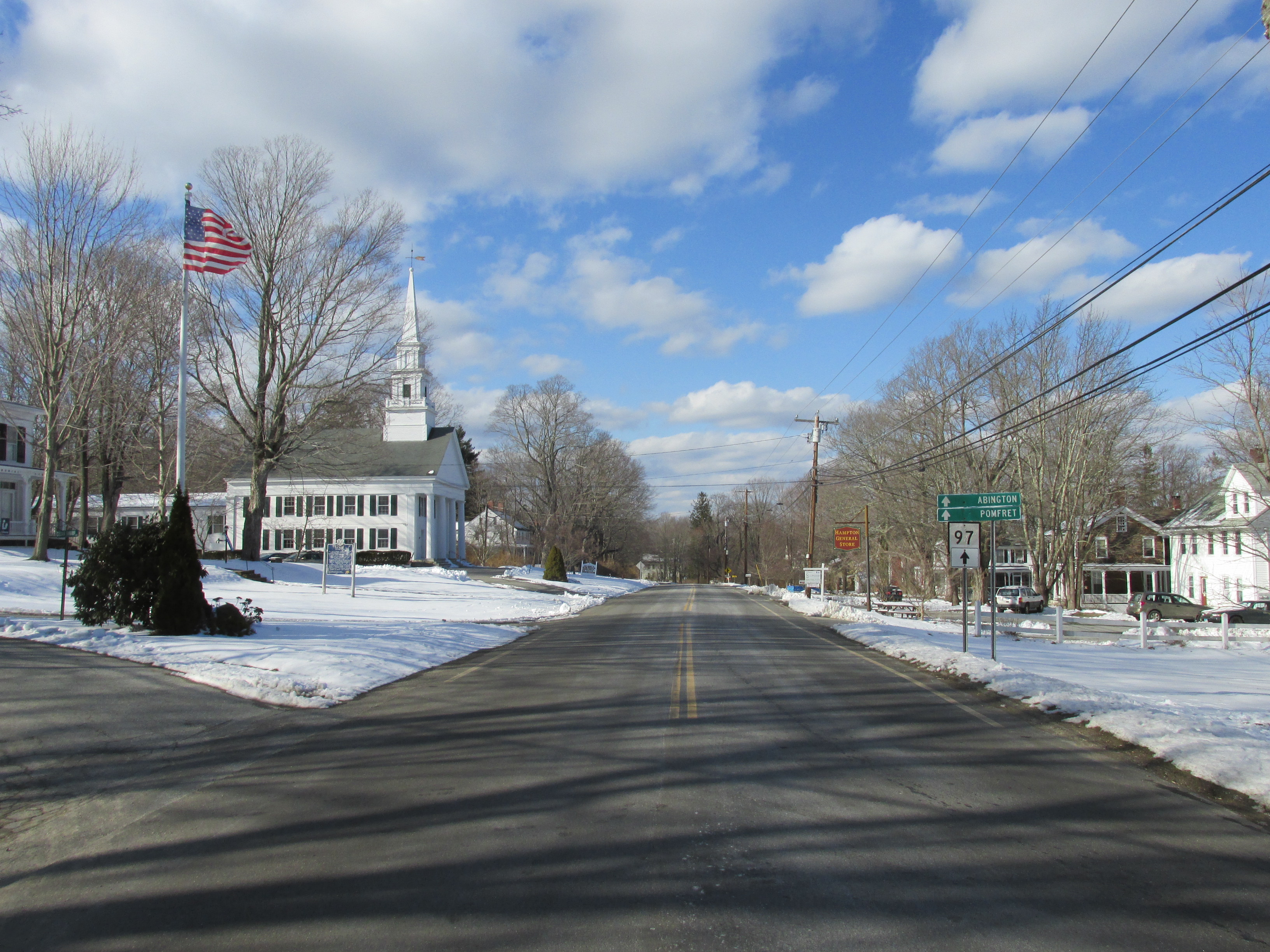
Route 97 northbound in Hampton

Route 97 begins at an intersection with Route 12 in the Taftville section of Norwich, then heads north along the Shetucket River, briefly overlapping with Route 169 before passing through Sprague into Scotland, where it overlaps Route 14 for 0.68 miles (1.09 km). After the overlap, it continues north and northeast through Hampton into Pomfret, where it ends at its northern of two intersections with US 44, also meeting Route 169.

Route 97 is designated a scenic route from its southern intersection with US 44 in Pomfret to its northern terminus, a distance of 4.50 miles (7.24 km).

== History ==
In 1922, the road from Abington to Pomfret Center along modern Route 97 was designated as State Highway 345. Further south, the road from Taftville to Baltic was part of State Highway 354, which continued past Baltic to Lebanon center. In the 1932 state highway renumbering, Highway 345 renumbered to Route 201, while most of Highway 354 (between Baltic and Lebanon center) became Route 207. Most of modern Route 97 was commissioned in 1932 as well, including the Taftville-Baltic portion of old Highway 354. The original Route 97 deviated from the current route at Station Road in Hampton and ran north to Route 91 (now Route 198) in Chaplin. It was relocated to its current route between Hampton and Abington using a previously unsigned state road (former SR 860) in 1934. At the same time, Route 97 absorbed former Route 201, extending the route to Pomfret Center.

== Junction list ==
County	Location	mi	km	Destinations	Notes
New London	Norwich	0.00	0.00	Route 12	Southern terminus
New London	Norwich	0.70	1.13	Route 169 north – Newent, Jewett City, Canterbury	Southern end of Route 169 concurrency
New London	Norwich	0.98	1.58	Route 169 south – Yantic	Northern end of Route 169 concurrency
New London	Norwich	2.13	3.43	I-395 – New Haven, Worcester, MA	Exit 18 on I-395; former Route 52
New London	Sprague	5.38	8.66	Route 207 west – North Franklin	Eastern terminus of Route 207
New London	Sprague	5.54	8.92	Route 138 east – Jewett City	Western terminus of Route 138
Windham	Scotland	11.26	18.12	Route 14 west – Windham	Southern end of Route 14 concurrency
Windham	Scotland	11.94	19.22	Route 14 east – Canterbury	Northern end of Route 14 concurrency
Windham	Hampton	16.80	27.04	US 6 – Chaplin, Brooklyn	
Windham	Pomfret	24.69	39.73	US 44 – Phoenixville, Pomfret	
Windham	Pomfret	28.41	45.72	Route 244 west – Eastford	Eastern terminus of Route 244
Windham	Pomfret	29.14	46.90	US 44 / Route 169 – Woodstock, Putnam, Brooklyn	Northern terminus
1.000 mi = 1.609 km; 1.000 km = 0.621 mi: Concurrency terminus
