= Connecticut Route 171 =

State highway in northeastern Connecticut, US

Route 171
- Map of northeastern Connecticut with Route 171 highlighted in red

Route information
- Maintained by CTDOT
- Length: 20.70 mi (33.31 km)
- Existed: January 1, 1959–present

Major junctions
- West end: I-84 in Union
- Route 198 in Woodstock; Route 169 in Woodstock
- East end: US 44 / Route 12 in Putnam

Location
- Country: United States
- State: Connecticut
- Counties: Tolland, Windham

Highway system
- Connecticut State Highway System; Interstate; US; State; SSR; SR; Scenic
← Route 169	→ Route 172

Route 171 is a state highway in northeastern Connecticut, running from Union to Putnam.

== Route description ==
Route 171 begins at an interchange from I-84 in northern Union (Also known as Mashapaug) and heads south to the town center, then east, south, and southeast into Eastford. It cuts across the northeast corner of Eastford into Woodstock. In Woodstock, it heads southeast, then turns northeast, briefly overlapping Route 198 before continuing. It then passes Toutant Airport and turns east, briefly overlapping Route 169 before cutting across the southwest corner of Thompson into Putnam. In Putnam, it continues southeast before ending at an intersection with US 44 and Route 12.

== History ==
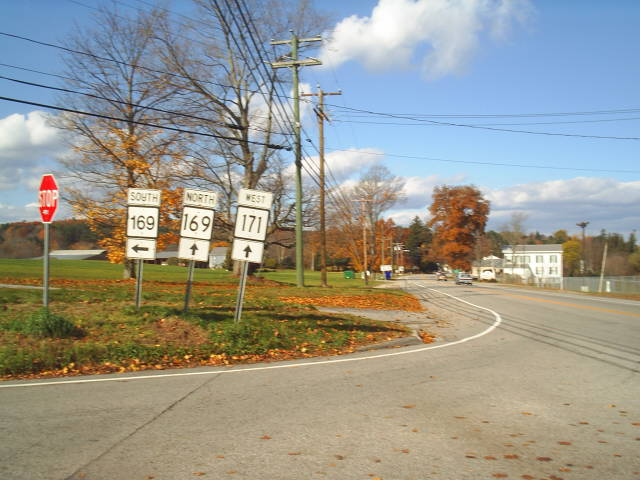
CT 171 at CT 169 in Woodstock

The portion of modern Route 171 between South Woodstock and Woodstock Valley was part of an early toll road known as Woodstock and Somers Turnpike. This section of the turnpike became part of a state highway in 1922 with the designation Highway 183. Old Highway 183 continued south of Woodstock Valley to Eastford along modern Route 198. Between Putnam and South Woodstock, modern Route 171 was part of Highway 142, which continued north along modern Route 169 to North Woodstock and the Massachusetts state line. In Union, the Buckley Highway became Highway 149.

In the 1932 state highway renumbering, Route 91 was created from old Highway 183. It began further south than the old route at US 6 in Chaplin using modern Route 198 and extended further east to Route 12 in Putnam (along part of old Highway 142). At the same time, the Buckley Highway became part of Route 15 and Bigelow Hollow Road became Route 198.

On January 1, 1959, Route 91 was renumbered as a result of the designation of Interstate 91 to avoid a numbering conflict. Route 171 was created from part of former Route 91, running from Woodstock Valley to the current eastern terminus at Route 12. The portion between Woodstock Valley and Chaplin became part of an extended Route 198. In 1963, Routes 171 and 198 were reconfigured to their current locations, resulting in part of Route 198 being redesignated as a westward extension of Route 171.

== Junction list ==
County	Location	mi	km	Destinations	Notes
Tolland	Union	0.00	0.00	I-84 – Hartford, Boston	Western terminus; exit 97 on I-84; former I-86
Tolland	Union	2.76	4.44	Route 190 west – Stafford Springs	Eastern terminus of Route 190
Tolland	Union	5.04	8.11	Route 197 east – North Woodstock	Western terminus of Route 197
Windham	Woodstock	9.53	15.34	Route 198 south – Eastford	Western end of Route 198 concurrency
Windham	Woodstock	10.43	16.79	Route 198 north – Southbridge, MA	Eastern end of Route 198 concurrency
Windham	Woodstock	17.17	27.63	Route 169 north – Woodstock	Western end of Route 169 concurrency
Windham	Woodstock	17.53	28.21	Route 169 south – Pomfret	Eastern end of Route 169 concurrency
Windham	Putnam	20.70	33.31	US 44 / Route 12 – Providence, RI, Norwich	Eastern terminus
1.000 mi = 1.609 km; 1.000 km = 0.621 mi: Concurrency terminus
