= Connecticut Route 14 =

State highway in Windham County, Connecticut, US

Route 14

Route information
- Maintained by CTDOT
- Length: 24.33 mi (39.16 km)
- Existed: 1932 (truncated 1941)–present

Major junctions
- West end: Route 66 / Route 195 in Windham
- Route 169 in Canterbury; Route 12 in Central Village; I-395 in Moosup
- East end: Route 14 at the Rhode Island state line in Oneco

Location
- Country: United States
- State: Connecticut
- Counties: Windham

Highway system
- Connecticut State Highway System; Interstate; US; State; SSR; SR; Scenic
← Route 12	→ Route 15

Connecticut Route 14 is one of several secondary routes from eastern Connecticut into Rhode Island. It runs from the Willimantic section of the town of Windham to the Rhode Island state line in Sterling.

== Route description ==
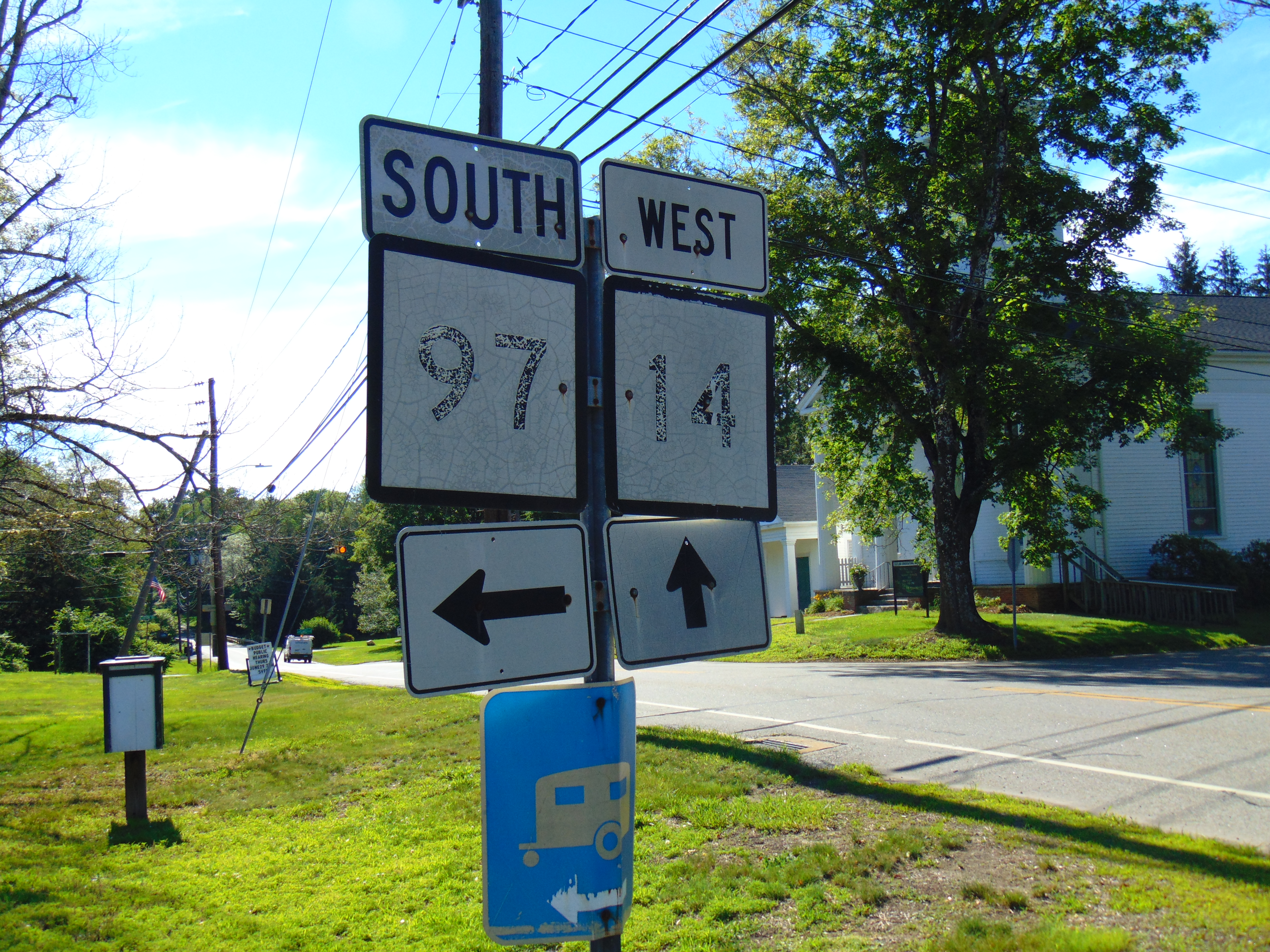
CT 14 intersecting CT 97 in Scotland.

Route 14 begins at a junction with Route 66 (Main Street) in Willimantic, initially as Main Street which changes to Brick Top Road after 0.2 miles (0.32 km). The road runs through Windham Center and briefly overlaps Route 203 as North Road, shifting to Scotland Road as it heads into the town of Scotland. In Scotland, Route 14 is known as Huntington Road and Palmer Road. It also overlaps Route 97 for 0.68 miles (1.09 km) from the eastern section of town to the center of it.

Route 14 continues east into the town of Canterbury where the road name changes to Westminster Road. The road intersects with Route 169 in the town center, at which point the road name changes to Lovell Lane and Plainfield Road. Immediately after crossing the Quinebaug River into the town of Plainfield, Route 14 turns left onto Black Hill Road while Route 14A continues straight as Canterbury Road. Route 14 passes through the village of Central Village as Main Street (while overlapped with Route 12) then East Main Street. It crosses under I-395 at Exit 32 along the north bank of the Moosup River.

East of I-395, Route 14 heads into the village of Moosup where the road uses a pair of one-way streets. Eastbound traffic uses Ward Avenue while westbound traffic uses Prospect Street. Heading out of the town of Plainfield, Route 14 uses Main Street then North Main Street, which later changes to Sterling Road near the town line. Sterling Road goes through the town center and meets with the east end of Route 14A at the Rhode Island state line. The road continues as Rhode Island Route 14.

A 4.4-mile (7.1 km) section between Windham and Scotland is a designated state scenic road, running through mostly rural areas.

== Route 14A ==
Route 14A
- Location: Plainfield Village and Oneco
- Length: 10.34 mi (16.64 km)

Connecticut Route 14A is an alternate route of Route 14 in the Plainfield and Sterling areas. Prior to 1963, Route 14A was the original road used by Route 14 between Canterbury and Plainfield. In Sterling, modern Route 14A was known as Route 211 between 1932 and 1950. From 1950 to 1963, the Sterling portion became an extension of former Route 95 (now Route 49). Route 14A is 10.30 miles (16.58 km) long and has junctions with Route 12 and I-395. It runs south of Route 14 between Canterbury center and the Rhode Island state line. Route 14A serves the villages of Plainfield Village and Oneco.

== History ==
Route 14A east of Route 12 was part of an early toll road connecting the cities of Norwich and Providence via Plainfield Village. The road was known as the New London and Windham County Turnpike and was chartered in 1795. It used modern Route 12 from Norwich to Plainfield and modern Route 14A to the Rhode Island state line. Modern Route 14 west of Route 12 was the eastern half of another early turnpike known as the Windham Turnpike, which was chartered in 1799 and began in Coventry and ran to Willimantic using modern Route 31 and Route 32, then from Willimantic through Scotland to Plainfield using modern Route 14.

In the 1920s, the Willimantic-Plainfield portion of the Windham Turnpike was designated as State Highway 141. The road from Central Village via Sterling center to the Rhode Island state line was assigned as State Highway 103, which continued as the same number in Rhode Island. The Route 14 designation was established as part of the 1932 state highway renumbering from old Highways 141 and 103 via an overlap with Route 12. When it was established, Route 14 extended further west than it does today. It extended all the way to Waterbury along modern Route 66, East Main Street in Meriden, modern Route 322, and Meriden Road in Waterbury (SR 844). The route served as an alternative to U.S. Route 6. This western extension was signed as part of U.S. Route 6A from 1941 to 1968, when it was replaced by I-84 as the main through route in the area. Route 14 was rerouted in Plainfield and Sterling in 1963, with the old route becoming the western half of modern Route 14A. The eastern half of Route 14A was designated on former unsigned SR 586 in Plainfield and former Route 211 in Sterling.

== Junction list ==
The entire route is in Windham County.

Location	mi	km	Destinations	Notes
Windham	0.00	0.00	Route 66 / Route 195 – Columbia, Hartford, Chaplin, Providence, RI	Western terminus
Windham	1.89	3.04	Route 203 north – North Windham	Western end of Route 203 concurrency
Windham	2.71	4.36	Route 203 south – South Windham	Eastern end of Route 203 concurrency
Scotland	6.64	10.69	Route 97 south – Baltic, Hanover, Norwich	Western end of Route 97 concurrency
Scotland	7.32	11.78	Route 97 north – Hampton	Eastern end of Route 97 concurrency
Canterbury	12.93	20.81	Route 169 – Brooklyn, Lisbon, Norwich	
Plainfield	13.46	21.66	Route 14A east – Plainfield	Western terminus of Route 14A
Plainfield	16.99	27.34	Route 12 north – Wauregan, Danielson	Western end of Route 12 concurrency
Plainfield	17.26	27.78	Route 12 south – Plainfield, Norwich	Eastern end of Route 12 concurrency
Plainfield	17.77	28.60	I-395 – Norwich, Worcester, MA	Exit 32 on I-395; former Route 52
Sterling	24.26	39.04	Route 14A west – Plainfield, Oneco	Eastern terminus of Route 14A
Sterling	24.33	39.16	Route 14 east – Providence	Continuation into Rhode Island
1.000 mi = 1.609 km; 1.000 km = 0.621 mi
