= Plainfield Village, Connecticut =

Census-designated place in Connecticut, United States

- Village
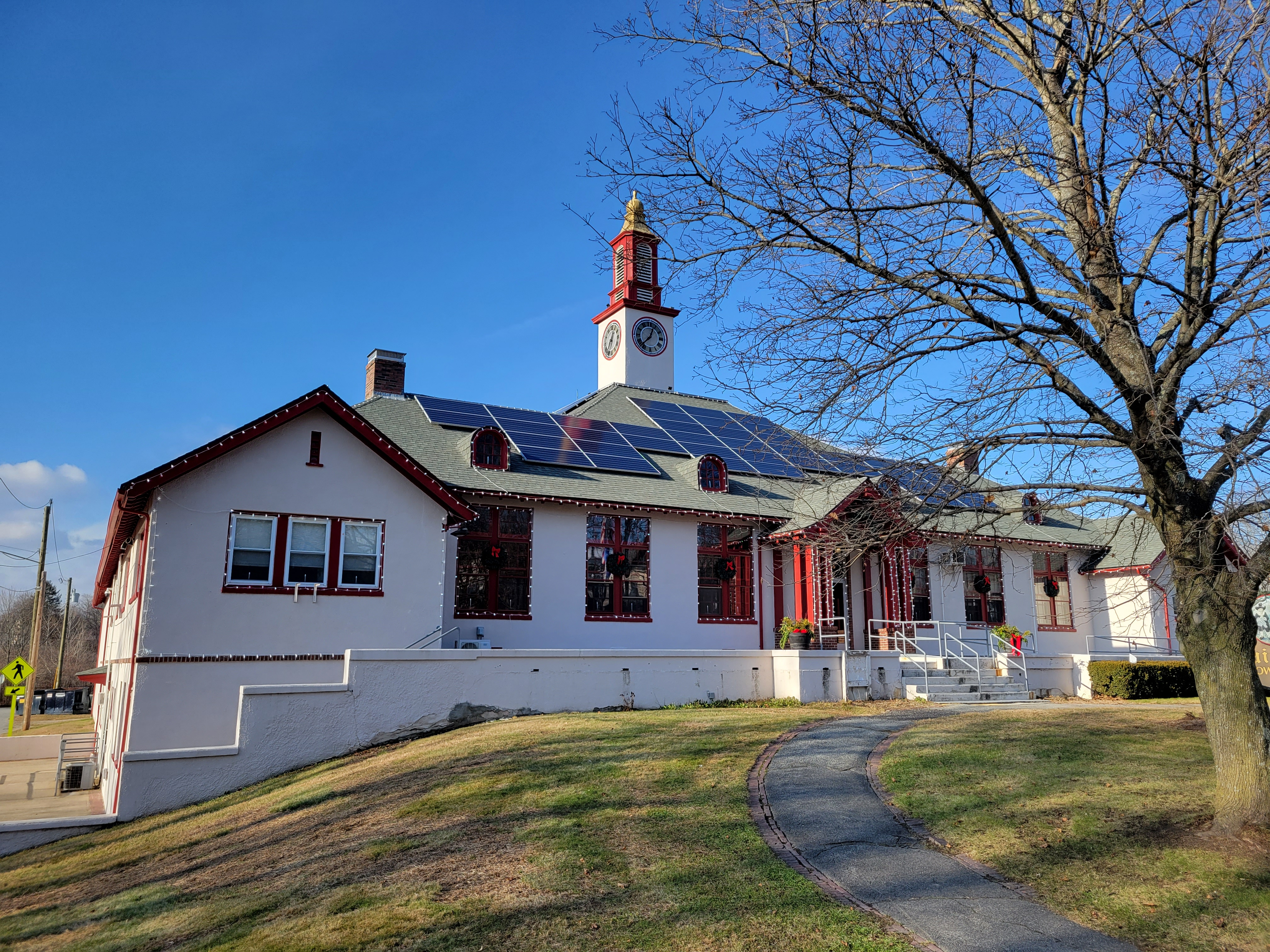
- Plainfield Town Hall

- Location in Windham County and the state of Connecticut.
- Coordinates: 41.7006°N 71.8947°W
- Country: United States
- State: Connecticut
- Town: Plainfield

Area
  - Total: 1.7 sq mi (4.4 km^{2})
  - Land: 1.6 sq mi (4.1 km^{2})
  - Water: 0.04 sq mi (0.10 km^{2})
- Elevation: 171 ft (52 m)

Population (2010)
  - Total: 2,557
  - Density: 1,600/sq mi (620/km^{2})
- Time zone: UTC−5 (Eastern (EST))
  - Summer (DST): UTC−4 (EDT)
- ZIP code: 06374
- Area code: 860
- FIPS code: 09-60090
- GNIS feature ID: 2377851

Plainfield Village is a village and census-designated place (CDP) in the town of Plainfield, Connecticut, United States. The population was 2,557 at the 2010 census. It is located in the southwestern section of town, in the area west of I-395 and south of Route 14. The village is also the core of the Plainfield, CT urban cluster.

== Geography ==
According to the United States Census Bureau, the CDP has a total area of 1.7 square miles (4.4 km^{2}), of which 1.6 square miles (4.1 km^{2}) is land and 0.04 square miles (0.10 km^{2}) (1.80%) is water.

== Demographics ==
As of the census of 2000, there were 2,638 people, 959 households, and 648 families residing in the CDP. The population density was 1,605.5 inhabitants per square mile (619.9/km^{2}). There were 1,007 housing units at an average density of 612.9 per square mile (236.6/km^{2}). The racial makeup of the CDP was 94.66% White, 1.48% African American, 0.80% Native American, 0.57% Asian, 1.21% from other races, and 1.29% from two or more races. Hispanic or Latino of any race were 2.35% of the population.

There were 959 households, out of which 36.7% had children under the age of 18 living with them, 45.0% were married couples living together, 14.3% had a female householder with no husband present, and 32.4% were non-families. 24.7% of all households were made up of individuals, and 11.7% had someone living alone who was 65 years of age or older. The average household size was 2.58 and the average family size was 3.03.

In the CDP, the population was spread out, with 25.8% under the age of 18, 8.7% from 18 to 24, 30.4% from 25 to 44, 18.9% from 45 to 64, and 16.3% who were 65 years of age or older. The median age was 36 years. For every 100 females, there were 90.5 males. For every 100 females age 18 and over, there were 85.9 males.

The median income for a household in the CDP was $33,268, and the median income for a family was $40,081. Males had a median income of $29,219 versus $23,261 for females. The per capita income for the CDP was $14,836. About 7.5% of families and 9.2% of the population were below the poverty line, including 13.1% of those under age 18 and none of those age 65 or over.
