= Sturbridge (CDP), Massachusetts =

Sturbridge, Massachusetts
- Census-designated place
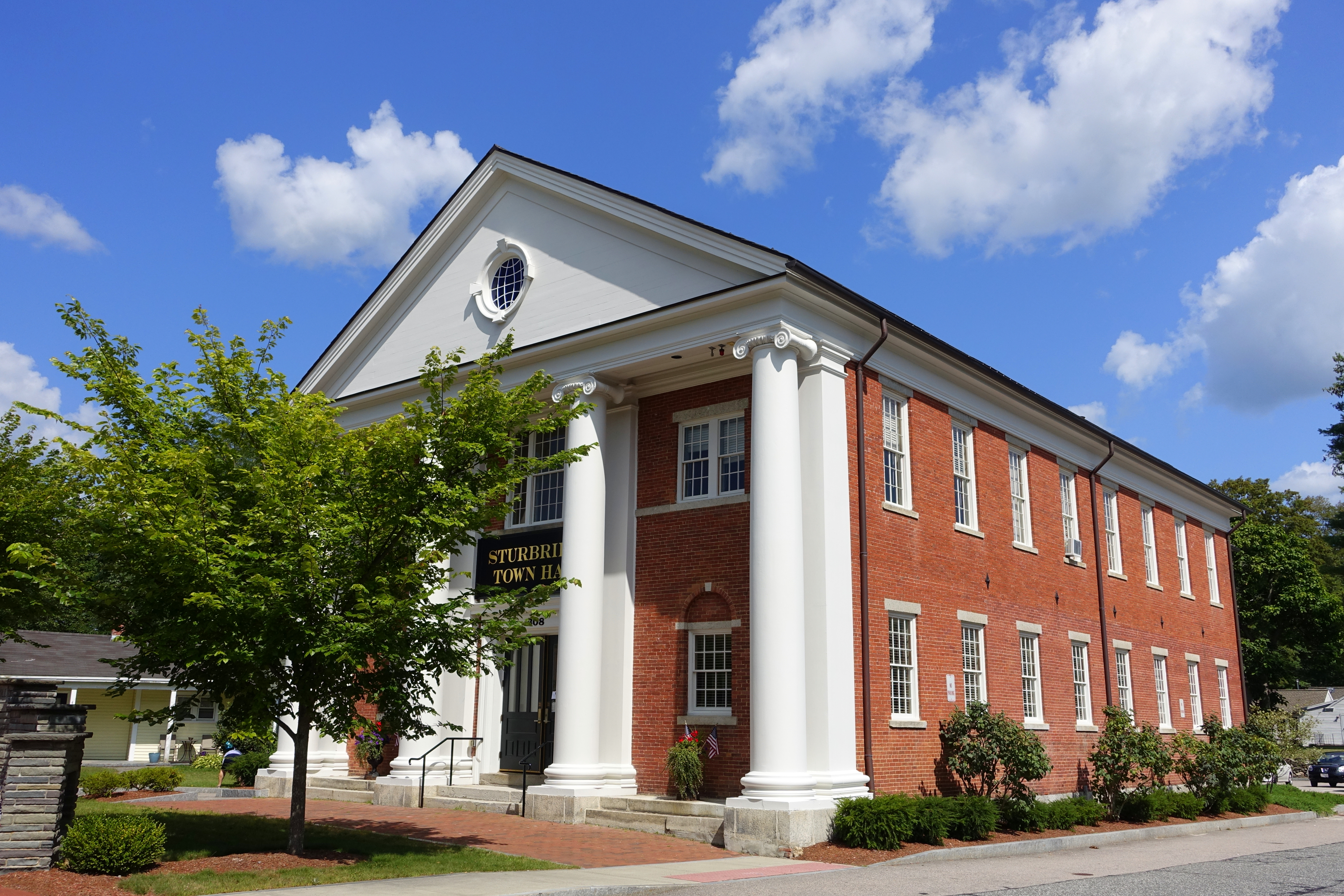
- Sturbridge Town Hall

- Location in Worcester County and the state of Massachusetts.
- Coordinates: 42°5′53″N 72°3′50″W
- Country: United States
- State: Massachusetts
- County: Worcester

Area
  - Total: 5.41 sq mi (14.00 km^{2})
  - Land: 5.33 sq mi (13.80 km^{2})
  - Water: 0.077 sq mi (0.20 km^{2})
- Elevation: 587 ft (179 m)

Population (2020)
  - Total: 2,385
  - Density: 447.5/sq mi (172.79/km^{2})
- Time zone: UTC-5 (Eastern (EST))
  - Summer (DST): UTC-4 (EDT)
- ZIP Code: 01566
- Area code: 508
- FIPS code: 25-68120
- GNIS feature ID: 0610150

Sturbridge is a census-designated place (CDP) in the town of Sturbridge in Worcester County, Massachusetts, United States. The population was 2,253 at the 2010 census.

== Geography ==
Sturbridge is located at 42°5′52″N 72°3′50″W (42.097954, -72.063936).

According to the United States Census Bureau, the CDP has a total area of 14.0 km^{2} (5.4 mi^{2}), of which 13.9 km^{2} (5.3 mi^{2}) is land and 0.1 km^{2} (0.04 mi^{2}) (0.74%) is water.

== Demographics ==
Historical population
| Census | Pop. | Note | %± |
|---|---|---|---|
| 2020 | 2,385 | | — |
U.S. Decennial Census

As of the census of 2000, there were 2,047 people, 795 households, and 580 families residing in the CDP. The population density was 147.7/km^{2} (382.8/mi^{2}). There were 823 housing units at an average density of 59.4/km^{2} (153.9/mi^{2}). The racial makeup of the CDP was 97.56% White, 0.10% Black or African American, 0.05% Native American, 2.05% Asian, 0.10% from other races, and 0.15% from two or more races. Hispanic or Latino of any race were 0.83% of the population.

There were 795 households, out of which 34.1% had children under the age of 18 living with them, 62.0% were married couples living together, 8.2% had a female householder with no husband present, and 27.0% were non-families. 22.1% of all households were made up of individuals, and 6.2% had someone living alone who was 65 years of age or older. The average household size was 2.57 and the average family size was 3.03.

In the CDP, the population was spread out, with 24.9% under the age of 18, 5.8% from 18 to 24, 31.7% from 25 to 44, 25.7% from 45 to 64, and 12.0% who were 65 years of age or older. The median age was 39 years. For every 100 females, there were 100.5 males. For every 100 females age 18 and over, there were 94.9 males.

The median income for a household in the CDP was $56,806, and the median income for a family was $65,649. Males had a median income of $45,000 versus $32,768 for females. The per capita income for the CDP was $24,596. About 5.1% of families and 5.7% of the population were below the poverty line, including 13.5% of those under age 18 and none of those age 65 or over.
