= Windham County, Connecticut =

County in Connecticut, United States

- County
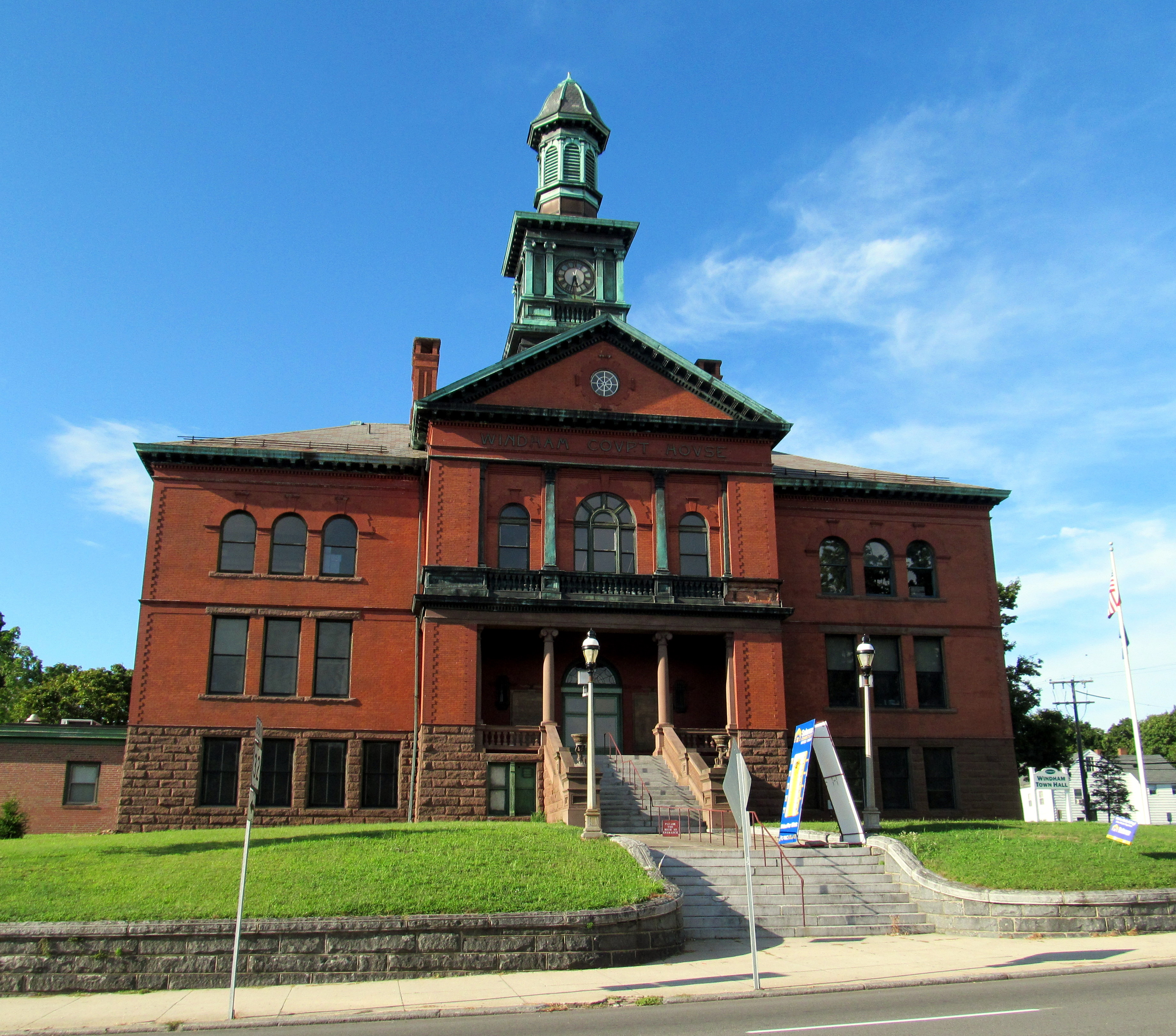
- Windham Town Hall, a former county courthouse

- Location within the U.S. state of Connecticut
- Coordinates: 41°50′N 71°59′W
- Country: United States
- State: Connecticut
- Founded: May 12, 1726
- Named for: Windham, England
- Seat: none (1960-present) Willimantic (1893–1960) Windham Center (1726–1893)
- Largest town: Windham

Area
  - Total: 521 sq mi (1,350 km^{2})
  - Land: 513 sq mi (1,330 km^{2})
  - Water: 8.5 sq mi (22 km^{2}) 1.6%

Population (2020)
  - Total: 116,418 ▼
  - Density: 223.5/sq mi (86.3/km^{2})
- Time zone: UTC−5 (Eastern)
  - Summer (DST): UTC−4 (EDT)
- Area code: 860 and 959
- Congressional district: 2nd

Interactive map of Windham County, Connecticut

Windham County (/ˈwɪndəm/ WIN-dəm) is one of the eight counties in the U.S. state of Connecticut, located in its northeastern corner. As of the 2020 census, the population was 116,418, making it the least populous county in Connecticut. It forms the core of the region known as the Quiet Corner. Windham County is included in the Worcester, MA-CT Metropolitan Statistical Area, which is also included in the Boston-Worcester-Providence, MA-RI-NH-CT Combined Statistical Area. The entire county is within the Quinebaug and Shetucket Rivers Valley National Heritage Corridor, as designated by the National Park Service.

== History ==
The area that is now Windham County became of interest to the English around 1635, but went unsettled for over fifty years due to its lack of access to the shore. John Winthrop the Younger took a strong interest to this land, purchased land from the Narragansetts, and was given permission by the court of Connecticut to settle in October 1671. In 1678, a tract of land, called Joshua's Tract (Joshua was the son of Mohegan chief Uncas), was willed to Connecticut officials, and in February 1682, it was gifted to Samuel and Daniel Mason. In 1684, 1200 acres of land was sold to Jonathan Curtis, Thomas Dudley and Samuel Mason, among others, by the Nipmunks.

Windham County was created from Hartford and New London counties on May 12, 1726, by an act of the Connecticut General Court. The act establishing the county states:

That the west bounds of the town of Lebanon, the north
bounds of Coventry, the north bounds of Mansfield till it
meet with the southwest bounds of Ashford, the west bounds
of Ashford, the east bounds of Stafford, the Massachusetts
line on the north, and Rhode Island line on the east, the north
bounds of Preston, and north bounds of Norwich, containing
the towns of Windham, Lebanon, Plainfield, Canterbury,
Mansfield, Coventry, Pomfret, Killingly, Ashford, Voluntown
and Mortlake, shall be one entire county, and called by the
name of County of Windham.

In May 1749, the town of Woodstock (formerly New Roxbury), Worcester County, Province of Massachusetts Bay, was unilaterally annexed by Connecticut Colony and assigned to Windham County. In 1785, the town of Union (incorporated in 1734) was transferred to the newly formed Tolland County. Over the next century, Windham County would lose several towns to Tolland and New London counties: Coventry to Tolland in 1786, Lebanon to New London in 1824, Columbia and Mansfield to Tolland in 1827, and Voluntown to New London in 1881. New towns were formed over the years using land from the original towns of the county: Thompson in 1785, Brooklyn and Hampton in 1786, Sterling in 1794, Chaplin in 1822, Eastford in 1847, Putnam in 1855, and Scotland in 1857. The final boundary adjustment occurred on April 7, 1885, when the boundary dispute between the towns of Windham and Mansfield was resolved.

On June 6, 2022, the U.S. Census Bureau formally recognized Connecticut's nine councils of governments as county equivalents instead of the state's eight counties. Connecticut's county governments were disbanded in 1960, and the councils of governments took over some of the local governmental functions. Connecticut's historical counties continue to exist in name only, and are no longer considered for statistical purposes.

== Geography ==
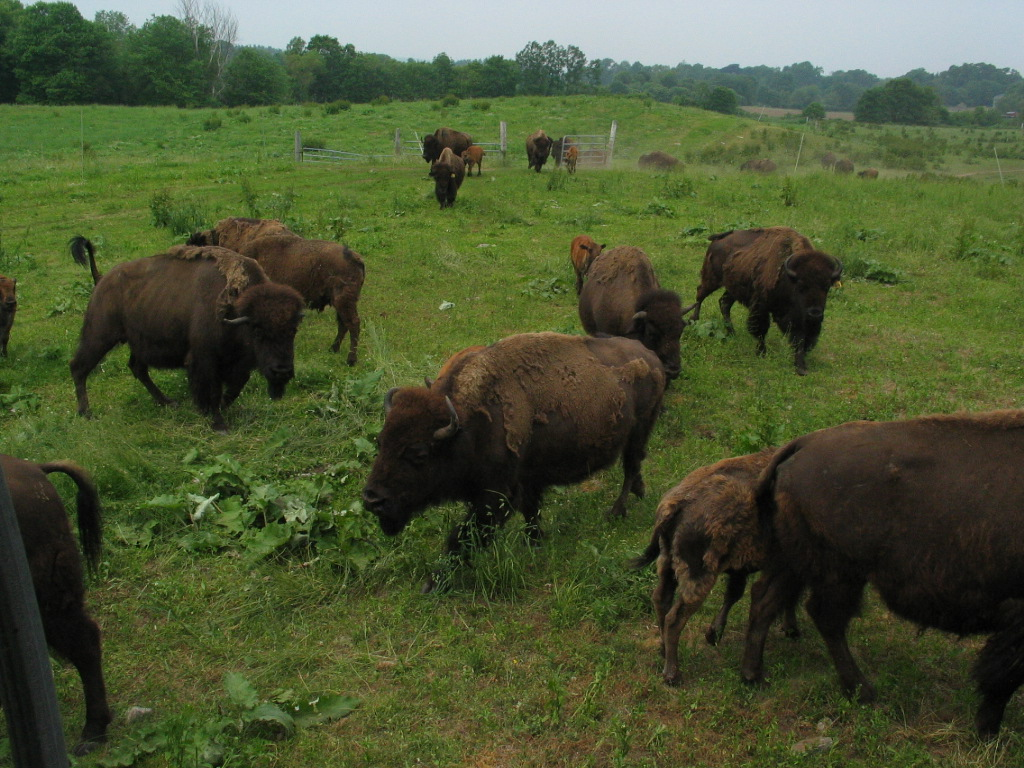
Bison Farm

According to the U.S. Census Bureau, the county has a total area of 521 square miles (1,350 km^{2}), of which 513 square miles (1,330 km^{2}) is land and 8.5 square miles (22 km^{2}) (1.6%) is water.

The highest point in Windham County is Snow Hill in Ashford at 1,210 feet.

=== Adjacent counties ===
- Worcester County, Massachusetts (north)
- Providence County, Rhode Island (east)
- Kent County, Rhode Island (southeast)
- New London County (south)
- Tolland County (west)

=== Climate ===
Climate data for Windham County, Connecticut (including University of Connecticut and Storrs, Connecticut), 1991–2020 normals, extremes 1888–present
Month	Jan	Feb	Mar	Apr	May	Jun	Jul	Aug	Sep	Oct	Nov	Dec	Year
Record high °F (°C)	68 (20)	69 (21)	83 (28)	95 (35)	93 (34)	96 (36)	101 (38)	97 (36)	97 (36)	89 (32)	82 (28)	73 (23)	101 (38)
Mean maximum °F (°C)	56.4 (13.6)	55.2 (12.9)	64.1 (17.8)	77.7 (25.4)	84.1 (28.9)	87.3 (30.7)	89.8 (32.1)	87.8 (31.0)	84.0 (28.9)	76.1 (24.5)	68.2 (20.1)	59.8 (15.4)	91.6 (33.1)
Mean daily maximum °F (°C)	35.0 (1.7)	37.2 (2.9)	44.8 (7.1)	57.0 (13.9)	67.6 (19.8)	75.6 (24.2)	80.5 (26.9)	79.1 (26.2)	72.7 (22.6)	61.3 (16.3)	50.3 (10.2)	40.1 (4.5)	58.4 (14.7)
Daily mean °F (°C)	26.9 (−2.8)	28.8 (−1.8)	36.3 (2.4)	47.5 (8.6)	57.7 (14.3)	66.3 (19.1)	71.7 (22.1)	70.0 (21.1)	63.4 (17.4)	52.1 (11.2)	42.1 (5.6)	32.7 (0.4)	49.6 (9.8)
Mean daily minimum °F (°C)	18.8 (−7.3)	20.4 (−6.4)	27.8 (−2.3)	38.0 (3.3)	47.7 (8.7)	57.0 (13.9)	62.8 (17.1)	60.9 (16.1)	54.1 (12.3)	42.9 (6.1)	34.0 (1.1)	25.3 (−3.7)	40.8 (4.9)
Mean minimum °F (°C)	−0.2 (−17.9)	3.2 (−16.0)	11.1 (−11.6)	26.6 (−3.0)	36.4 (2.4)	44.9 (7.2)	53.3 (11.8)	51.2 (10.7)	40.3 (4.6)	29.7 (−1.3)	20.0 (−6.7)	9.9 (−12.3)	−2.1 (−18.9)
Record low °F (°C)	−19 (−28)	−20 (−29)	−6 (−21)	10 (−12)	25 (−4)	35 (2)	42 (6)	37 (3)	26 (−3)	16 (−9)	1 (−17)	−17 (−27)	−20 (−29)
Average precipitation inches (mm)	3.65 (93)	2.99 (76)	4.38 (111)	4.23 (107)	3.73 (95)	4.52 (115)	4.01 (102)	4.30 (109)	4.48 (114)	4.58 (116)	3.90 (99)	4.50 (114)	49.27 (1,251)
Average snowfall inches (cm)	8.3 (21)	14.1 (36)	6.3 (16)	1.7 (4.3)	0.0 (0.0)	0.0 (0.0)	0.0 (0.0)	0.0 (0.0)	0.0 (0.0)	0.3 (0.76)	1.1 (2.8)	7.2 (18)	39.0 (99)
Average precipitation days (≥ 0.01 in)	10.2	9.0	10.2	11.3	12.7	10.9	10.5	9.5	9.0	10.6	9.1	10.4	123.4
Average snowy days (≥ 0.1 in)	3.8	4.0	2.5	0.6	0.0	0.0	0.0	0.0	0.0	0.1	0.4	2.1	13.5
Source 1: NOAA
Source 2: National Weather Service

== Government ==
County level government in the state of Connecticut was abolished in 1960. All government affairs and services are administered by either the state or local municipality.

The office of county high sheriff was abolished by constitutional referendum in 2000. All former functions of the county sheriff's office are now carried out by the state marshals service. The last high sheriff (or official for that matter) of Windham County was Thomas W. White, who left office in 2000 due to the discontinuation of the county sheriff's departments in Connecticut.

== Transportation ==
=== Roads ===
Major highways through Windham County include Interstate 395, which runs north–south from the New London County line at Plainfield to the Massachusetts state line at Thompson. The southern part of I-395 is part of the Connecticut Turnpike, which branches off the interstate in Killingly and runs east–west from I-395 exit 35, to U.S. Route 6 at the Rhode Island state line.

Other north–south routes include Route 12, which parallels I-395 through many local communities, Route 169, a National Scenic Byway traveling through rural communities from the New London County line in Canterbury to the Massachusetts state line in Woodstock. Other secondary north–south roads are Routes 89, 198, 97, 21, and 49.

Major east–west routes are U.S. Route 44 from the Tolland County line at Ashford to the Rhode Island state line at Putnam, and U.S. Route 6 from the Tolland County line at Windham to the Rhode Island state line at Killingly. U.S. Route 6 has short expressway segments in Windham and Killingly. Other secondary east–west roads are Routes 14, 101, 171, and 197.

=== Air ===
Windham Airport is the primary airport for the county, located three miles from Willimantic. Other smaller airports include Woodstock Airport and Danielson Airport.

=== Biking ===
There are many bike paths in the county. The major two trails are the Air Line State Park Trail and the Hop River State Park Trail, both these trails enter the county through Windham. The Hop River Trail ends at the Air Line Trail shortly after entering the county, while the Air Line Trail continues all the way into Putnam. Another section of the Air Line Trail is in Thompson, which continues to the border with Massachusetts which it counties as the Southern New England Trunkline Trail. Another shorter trail is the Moosup Valley State Park Trail that starts in Plainfield and continues down into the state border with Rhode Island which it continues as Washington Secondary Rail Trail. Smaller trails include the Quinebaug River Trail and the Putnam River Trail.

== Law enforcement ==
The primary law enforcement agency most Windham County towns is the Connecticut State Police, primarily Troop D based in Danielson which serves Brooklyn, Canterbury, Chaplin, Eastford, Hampton, Killingly, Pomfret, Putnam (outside the SSD), Scotland, Sterling, Thompson, Woodstock and I-395 between exit 28 and the MA border. Troop C, based in Tolland, covers the town of Ashford, and Troop K, based in Colchester, covers the town of Windham.

Only three municipalities in the county (the town of Plainfield, the Willimantic Special Services District, and the Putnam Special Services District), have their own local police departments that serve as the primary law enforcement in those areas. Eastern Connecticut State University located in Willimantic also has its own local police department (established under Connecticut General Statutes Sec. 10a-142) which serves as the primary law enforcement agency for the university campus even though they are located within the Willimantic Special Services District.

The Windham County Sheriff's Department was disbanded in 2000 and their former duties are now carried out by the Connecticut State Marshals Service.

Most towns in the county have local Constables that carry out some municipal legal and security functions.

== Demographics ==
Historical population
Census	Pop.	Note	%±
1790	28,881		—
1800	28,222		−2.3%
1810	28,611		1.4%
1820	31,684		10.7%
1830	27,082		−14.5%
1840	28,080		3.7%
1850	31,081		10.7%
1860	34,747		11.8%
1870	38,518		10.9%
1880	43,856		13.9%
1890	45,158		3.0%
1900	46,861		3.8%
1910	48,361		3.2%
1920	52,815		9.2%
1930	54,086		2.4%
1940	56,223		4.0%
1950	61,759		9.8%
1960	68,572		11.0%
1970	84,515		23.3%
1980	92,312		9.2%
1990	102,525		11.1%
2000	109,091		6.4%
2010	118,428		8.6%
2020	116,418		−1.7%
U.S. Decennial Census; 1790-1960 1900-1990; 1990-2000 2010-2018

=== 2020 census ===
As of the 2020 census, the county had a population of 116,418. Of the residents, 19.9% were under the age of 18 and 17.6% were 65 years of age or older; the median age was 41.3 years. For every 100 females there were 97.6 males, and for every 100 females age 18 and over there were 95.9 males. 49.4% of residents lived in urban areas and 50.6% lived in rural areas.

The racial makeup of the county was 81.6% White, 2.1% Black or African American, 0.7% American Indian and Alaska Native, 1.7% Asian, 0.0% Native Hawaiian and Pacific Islander, 5.7% from some other race, and 8.2% from two or more races. Hispanic or Latino residents of any race comprised 12.4% of the population.

There were 45,874 households in the county, of which 28.1% had children under the age of 18 living with them and 26.2% had a female householder with no spouse or partner present. About 27.3% of all households were made up of individuals and 11.7% had someone living alone who was 65 years of age or older.

There were 49,590 housing units, of which 7.5% were vacant. Among occupied housing units, 68.2% were owner-occupied and 31.8% were renter-occupied. The homeowner vacancy rate was 1.3% and the rental vacancy rate was 5.0%.

=== Racial and ethnic composition ===
Windham County, Connecticut – Racial and ethnic composition Note: the US Census treats Hispanic/Latino as an ethnic category. This table excludes Latinos from the racial categories and assigns them to a separate category. Hispanics/Latinos may be of any race.
Race / Ethnicity (NH = Non-Hispanic)	Pop 1980	Pop 1990	Pop 2000	Pop 2010	Pop 2020	% 1980	% 1990	% 2000	% 2010	% 2020
White alone (NH)	88,908	96,098	96,666	101,138	91,844	96.31%	93.73%	88.61%	85.40%	78.89%
Black or African American alone (NH)	625	1,022	1,739	1,995	2,064	0.68%	1.00%	1.59%	1.68%	1.77%
Native American or Alaska Native alone (NH)	262	337	453	436	326	0.28%	0.33%	0.42%	0.37%	0.28%
Asian alone (NH)	225	737	901	1,360	1,960	0.24%	0.72%	0.83%	1.15%	1.68%
Native Hawaiian or Pacific Islander alone (NH)	x	x	34	38	17	x	x	0.03%	0.03%	0.01%
Other race alone (NH)	206	70	92	126	506	0.22%	0.07%	0.08%	0.11%	0.43%
Mixed race or Multiracial (NH)	x	x	1,469	1,984	5,242	x	x	1.35%	1.68%	4.50%
Hispanic or Latino (any race)	2,086	4,261	7,737	11,351	14,459	2.26%	4.16%	7.09%	9.58%	12.42%
Total	92,312	102,525	109,091	118,428	116,418	100.00%	100.00%	100.00%	100.00%	100.00%

=== 2010 census ===
As of the 2010 United States census, there were 118,428 people, 44,810 households, and 30,343 families residing in the county. The population density was 230.9 inhabitants per square mile (89.2/km^{2}). There were 49,073 housing units at an average density of 95.7 per square mile (36.9/km^{2}). The racial makeup of the county was 89.6% white, 2.2% black or African American, 1.2% Asian, 0.5% American Indian, 4.2% from other races, and 2.3% from two or more races. Those of Hispanic or Latino origin made up 9.6% of the population. In terms of ancestry, 18.8% were Irish, 13.5% were English, 11.7% were French Canadian, 11.5% were Italian, 10.2% were German, 9.3% were Polish, and 2.9% were American.

Of the 44,810 households, 32.6% had children under the age of 18 living with them, 50.0% were married couples living together, 12.3% had a female householder with no husband present, 32.3% were non-families, and 24.6% of all households were made up of individuals. The average household size was 2.54 and the average family size was 3.01. The median age was 39.2 years.

The median income for a household in the county was $59,370 and the median income for a family was $69,642. Males had a median income of $48,880 versus $36,873 for females. The per capita income for the county was $26,457. About 8.7% of families and 11.4% of the population were below the poverty line, including 16.0% of those under age 18 and 7.7% of those age 65 or over.

=== Demographics breakdown by town ===
Data is from the 2010 United States Census and the 2006-2010 American Community Survey 5-Year Estimates.

Rank	Town		Per capita income	Median household income	Median family income	Population	Number of households
1	Eastford	Town	$36,784	$76,786	$93,295	1,749	690
2	Woodstock	Town	$36,342	$74,000	$88,737	7,964	3,151
3	Hampton	Town	$34,642	$79,943	$84,079	1,863	747
4	Pomfret	Town	$33,910	$68,278	$82,917	4,247	1,582
5	Ashford	Town	$32,842	$69,407	$79,157	4,317	1,716
6	Chaplin	Town	$32,188	$62,679	$72,426	2,305	920
7	Canterbury	Town	$30,453	$70,902	$84,093	5,132	1,934
8	Scotland	Town	$29,371	$75,417	$79,722	1,726	637
9	Thompson	Town	$27,222	$60,951	$74,613	9,458	3,730
10	Putnam	Town	$26,506	$51,180	$61,168	9,584	3,950
11	Sterling	Town	$25,557	$64,500	$74,405	3,830	1,383
12	Killingly	Town	$25,215	$53,192	$65,496	17,370	6,749
13	Brooklyn	Town	$25,124	$68,851	$76,224	8,210	2,989
14	Plainfield	Town	$24,825	$61,500	$69,096	15,405	5,726
15	Danielson	Borough	$22,798	$55,097	$56,831	4,051	1,627
16	Windham	Town	$20,272	$40,063	$48,145	25,268	8,906

== Politics ==
Windham County leaned toward Democratic candidates at the presidential level from 1992 to 2012 but then swung its support to Republican candidate Donald Trump in 2016, 2020, and 2024, even as Trump lost Connecticut all three times. Trump won it by double digits in 2024, his best performance in the state.

Windham remained Democratic downballot in the state's Senate races during Trump's first term, in 2016 and 2018. However, in the leadup to Trump's second, nonconsecutive term, the county started shifting rightward in the Senate races as well; the Republican candidates won Windham in 2022 and 2024 despite losing statewide.

United States presidential election results for Windham County, Connecticut
Year	Republican		Democratic		Third party(ies)	
Year	No.	%	No.	%	No.	%
1884	4,139	58.32%	2,748	38.72%	210	2.96%
1888	4,195	54.67%	3,185	41.51%	293	3.82%
1892	4,154	52.27%	3,363	42.32%	430	5.41%
1896	5,423	71.23%	1,927	25.31%	263	3.45%
1900	4,951	65.00%	2,560	33.61%	106	1.39%
1904	4,934	61.82%	2,833	35.50%	214	2.68%
1908	4,960	63.57%	2,623	33.62%	219	2.81%
1912	3,051	41.82%	2,881	39.49%	1,363	18.68%
1916	4,259	51.86%	3,797	46.23%	157	1.91%
1920	8,594	61.95%	5,071	36.56%	207	1.49%
1924	9,488	59.64%	5,475	34.42%	945	5.94%
1928	10,040	51.35%	9,447	48.31%	66	0.34%
1932	9,522	46.38%	10,801	52.61%	206	1.00%
1936	11,466	46.00%	12,605	50.57%	857	3.44%
1940	12,079	44.55%	14,989	55.29%	43	0.16%
1944	12,032	44.53%	14,886	55.09%	104	0.38%
1948	13,692	46.49%	15,433	52.40%	328	1.11%
1952	17,979	53.53%	15,535	46.25%	74	0.22%
1956	20,029	59.64%	13,553	40.36%	0	0.00%
1960	15,180	43.02%	20,105	56.98%	0	0.00%
1964	9,080	26.44%	25,238	73.50%	19	0.06%
1968	14,162	40.84%	19,098	55.08%	1,414	4.08%
1972	21,621	56.04%	16,459	42.66%	504	1.31%
1976	17,643	46.11%	20,380	53.26%	239	0.62%
1980	18,852	47.82%	15,444	39.18%	5,123	13.00%
1984	24,917	61.59%	15,351	37.95%	187	0.46%
1988	21,268	50.88%	20,005	47.86%	526	1.26%
1992	14,963	30.80%	19,621	40.38%	14,004	28.82%
1996	13,237	30.97%	22,077	51.65%	7,432	17.39%
2000	16,708	38.00%	24,023	54.64%	3,232	7.35%
2004	22,324	45.69%	25,477	52.14%	1,060	2.17%
2008	21,210	41.72%	28,673	56.39%	961	1.89%
2012	19,768	42.43%	25,957	55.72%	863	1.85%
2016	25,747	50.66%	21,792	42.88%	3,284	6.46%
2020	29,141	51.05%	26,706	46.79%	1,235	2.16%
2024	30,911	54.34%	25,073	44.08%	903	1.59%

United States Senate election results for Windham County, Connecticut1
Year	Republican		Democratic		Third party(ies)	
Year	No.	%	No.	%	No.	%
2012	20,764	46.60%	22,712	50.97%	1,082	2.43%
2018	19,032	45.52%	22,058	52.76%	716	1.71%
2024	27,118	49.85%	26,116	48.01%	1,168	2.15%

United States Senate election results for Windham County, Connecticut2
Year	Republican		Democratic		Third party(ies)	
Year	No.	%	No.	%	No.	%
2010	15,258	42.53%	19,840	55.30%	782	2.18%
2016	18,546	37.81%	28,849	58.81%	1,657	3.38%
2022	20,652	52.75%	18,495	47.24%	2	0.01%

Connecticut Gubernatorial election results for Windham County
Year	Republican		Democratic		Third party(ies)	
Year	No.	%	No.	%	No.	%
2010	17,114	50.06%	16,212	47.42%	862	2.52%
2014	16,561	50.11%	15,901	48.11%	589	1.78%
2018	22,210	52.35%	17,571	41.42%	2,643	6.23%
2022	20,688	52.47%	18,264	46.32%	474	1.20%

== Communities ==
Boroughs are incorporated portions of one or more towns with separate borough councils, zoning boards, and borough officials. Villages are named localities, but have no separate corporate existence from the towns they are in.

- Ashford
  - Lake Chaffee
- Brooklyn
  - Brooklyn
  - East Brooklyn
  - Wauregan (part)
- Canterbury
- Chaplin
- Eastford
- Hampton
- Killingly
  - Danielson
  - Dayville
- Plainfield
  - Central Village
  - Moosup
  - Plainfield Village
  - Wauregan (part)
- Pomfret
- Putnam
  - Putnam District
- Scotland
- Sterling
  - Oneco
- Thompson
  - Fabyan
  - Mechanicsville
  - North Grosvenordale
  - Quinebaug
- Windham
  - South Windham
  - Willimantic
- Woodstock
  - Lake Bungee
  - Quasset Lake
  - South Woodstock
  - Witches Woods

== Education ==
School districts include:

K-12:

- Killingly School District
- Plainfield School District
- Putnam School District
- Thompson School District
- Windham School District

Secondary:

- Regional High School District 19
- Regional High School District 11

Elementary:

- Ashford School District
- Brooklyn School District
- Canterbury School District
- Chaplin School District
- Eastford School District
- Hampton School District
- Pomfret School District
- Scotland School District
- Sterling School District
- Woodstock School District

There is also Woodstock Academy, a privately endowed publicly funded high school.

== See also ==
- National Register of Historic Places listings in Windham County, Connecticut
