= Webster (CDP), Massachusetts =

Webster, Massachusetts
- CDP
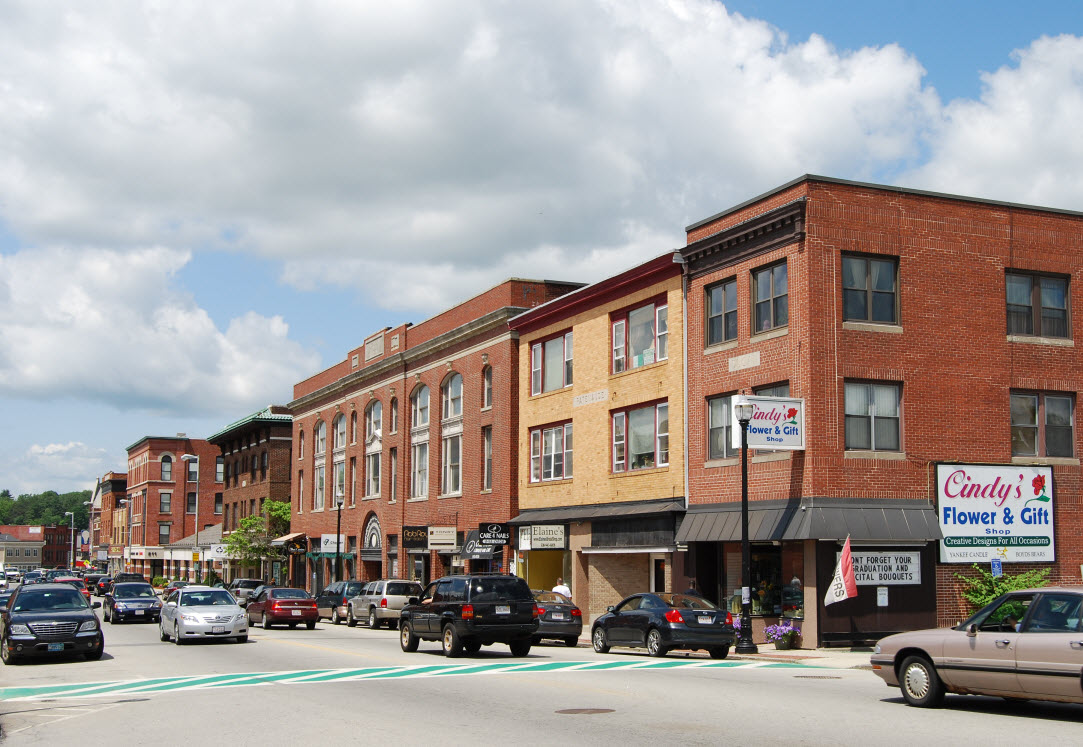
- Downtown Webster

- Location in Worcester County and the state of Massachusetts.
- Coordinates: 42°2′56″N 71°52′32″W
- Country: United States
- State: Massachusetts
- County: Worcester

Area
  - Total: 3.03 sq mi (7.84 km^{2})
  - Land: 2.97 sq mi (7.69 km^{2})
  - Water: 0.054 sq mi (0.14 km^{2})
- Elevation: 463 ft (141 m)

Population (2020)
  - Total: 12,194
  - Density: 4,104.7/sq mi (1,584.82/km^{2})
- Time zone: UTC-5 (Eastern (EST))
  - Summer (DST): UTC-4 (EDT)
- ZIP code: 01570
- Area code: 508
- FIPS code: 25-73930
- GNIS feature ID: 0610298

Webster is a census-designated place (CDP) in the town of Webster in Worcester County, Massachusetts, United States. The population was 11,412 at the 2010 census.

== Geography ==
Webster is located at 42°2′56″N 71°52′32″W (42.048981, −71.875602).

According to the United States Census Bureau, the CDP has a total area of 7.7 km^{2} (3.0 mi^{2}), of which 7.5 km^{2} (2.9 mi^{2}) is land and 0.2 km^{2} (0.1 mi^{2}) (2.03%) is water.

== Demographics ==
Historical population
| Census | Pop. | Note | %± |
|---|---|---|---|
| 2020 | 12,194 | | — |
U.S. Decennial Census

As of the census of 2000, there were 11,600 people, 5,024 households, and 2,868 families residing in the CDP. The population density was 1,544.4/km^{2} (3,996.8/mi^{2}). There were 5,425 housing units at an average density of 722.3/km^{2} (1,869.2/mi^{2}). The racial makeup of the CDP was 93.67% White, 1.34% Black or African American, 0.40% Native American, 1.09% Asian, 1.93% from other races, and 1.57% from two or more races. Hispanic or Latino of any race were 5.07% of the population.

There were 5,024 households, out of which 27.3% had children under the age of 18 living with them, 38.3% were married couples living together, 13.7% had a female householder with no husband present, and 42.9% were non-families. 36.0% of all households were made up of individuals, and 15.6% had someone living alone who was 65 years of age or older. The average household size was 2.26 and the average family size was 2.93.

In the CDP, the population was spread out, with 23.4% under the age of 18, 8.0% from 18 to 24, 30.6% from 25 to 44, 19.5% from 45 to 64, and 18.5% who were 65 years of age or older. The median age was 37 years. For every 100 females, there were 89.0 males. For every 100 females age 18 and over, there were 84.2 males.

The median income for a household in the CDP was $32,163, and the median income for a family was $43,643. Males had a median income of $35,187 versus $26,432 for females. The per capita income for the CDP was $18,524. About 10.5% of families and 13.7% of the population were below the poverty line, including 16.0% of those under age 18 and 16.5% of those age 65 or over.
