= Quinebaug, Connecticut =

- Census-designated place
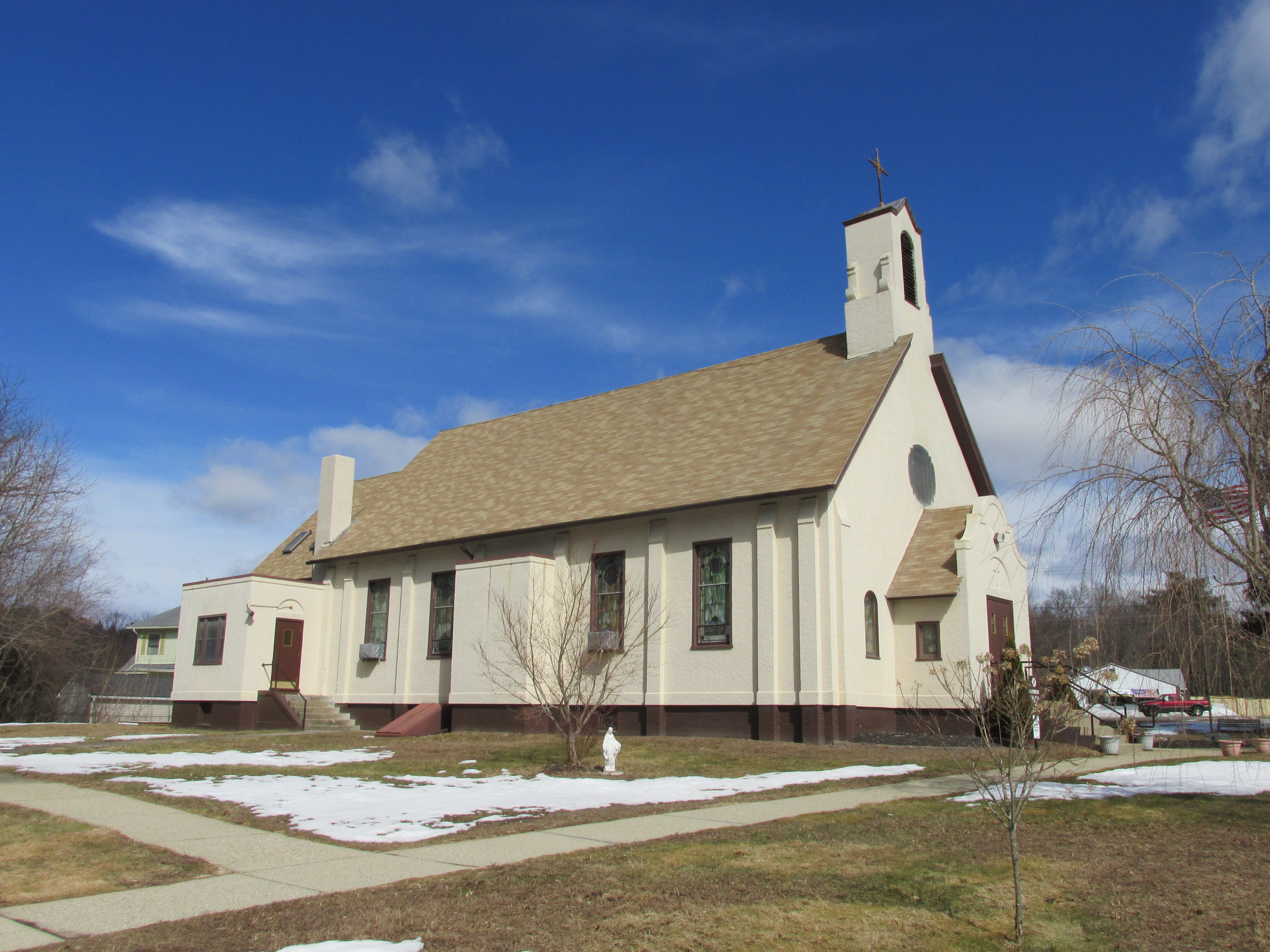
- St. Stephen's Church

- Location in Windham County and the state of Connecticut.
- Coordinates: 42°01′25″N 71°56′59″W
- Country: United States
- State: Connecticut
- County: Windham
- Town: Thompson

Area
  - Total: 4.6 sq mi (11.8 km^{2})
  - Land: 4.4 sq mi (11.3 km^{2})
  - Water: 0.15 sq mi (0.4 km^{2})
- Elevation: 341 ft (104 m)

Population (2010)
  - Total: 1,133
  - Density: 260/sq mi (100/km^{2})
- Time zone: UTC-5 (Eastern (EST))
  - Summer (DST): UTC-4 (EDT)
- Area code: 860
- FIPS code: 09-63270
- GNIS feature ID: 2377855

Quinebaug (/ˈkwɪnəbɔːɡ/ KWIH-nə-bawg) is a village and census-designated place (CDP) in Thompson, a town in Windham County, Connecticut, United States. As of the 2020 census, Quinebaug had a population of 1,114.

== Geography ==
According to the United States Census Bureau, the CDP has a total area of 11.8 km^{2} (4.5 mi^{2}), of which 11.3 km^{2} (4.4 mi^{2}) is land and 0.4 km^{2} (0.2 mi^{2}) (3.74%) is water. The CDP is located where the Quinebaug River enters Connecticut from Massachusetts.

== Demographics ==
=== 2020 census ===
As of the 2020 census, Quinebaug had a population of 1,114. The median age was 51.5 years. 15.4% of residents were under the age of 18 and 25.9% of residents were 65 years of age or older. For every 100 females there were 91.4 males, and for every 100 females age 18 and over there were 94.4 males age 18 and over.

44.3% of residents lived in urban areas, while 55.7% lived in rural areas.

There were 497 households in Quinebaug, of which 23.5% had children under the age of 18 living in them. Of all households, 50.1% were married-couple households, 15.5% were households with a male householder and no spouse or partner present, and 25.8% were households with a female householder and no spouse or partner present. About 28.4% of all households were made up of individuals and 16.1% had someone living alone who was 65 years of age or older.

There were 519 housing units, of which 4.2% were vacant. The homeowner vacancy rate was 1.8% and the rental vacancy rate was 1.6%.

Racial composition as of the 2020 census
Race	Number	Percent
White	1,001	89.9%
Black or African American	3	0.3%
American Indian and Alaska Native	3	0.3%
Asian	14	1.3%
Native Hawaiian and Other Pacific Islander	0	0.0%
Some other race	22	2.0%
Two or more races	71	6.4%
Hispanic or Latino (of any race)	49	4.4%

=== 2000 census ===
As of the census of 2000, there were 1,122 people, 454 households, and 310 families residing in the CDP. The population density was 99.4/km^{2} (257.1/mi^{2}). There were 476 housing units at an average density of 42.2/km^{2} (109.1/mi^{2}). The racial makeup of the CDP was 98.31% White, 1.16% African American, 0.18% Native American, 0.27% Asian, and 0.09% from two or more races. Hispanic or Latino of any race were 0.09% of the population.

There were 454 households, out of which 28.4% had children under the age of 18 living with them, 57.5% were married couples living together, 7.3% had a female householder with no husband present, and 31.7% were non-families. 26.7% of all households were made up of individuals, and 13.0% had someone living alone who was 65 years of age or older. The average household size was 2.47 and the average family size was 3.01.

In the CDP the population was spread out, with 22.5% under the age of 18, 6.0% from 18 to 24, 26.5% from 25 to 44, 24.7% from 45 to 64, and 20.3% who were 65 years of age or older. The median age was 41 years. For every 100 females, there were 104.4 males. For every 100 females age 18 and over, there were 97.5 males.

The median income for a household in the CDP was $37,614, and the median income for a family was $51,667. Males had a median income of $37,292 versus $29,375 for females. The per capita income for the CDP was $20,615. None of the families and 4.1% of the population were living below the poverty line, including no under eighteens and 4.8% of those over 64.
