= List of Connecticut locations by per capita income =

In terms of per capita income, Connecticut is the wealthiest state in the United States of America. As of 2024, Connecticut had a per capita income of $55,915.

Despite its high per capita income, Connecticut is still mainly a middle to upper-middle class state. Much of Connecticut’s wealth is concentrated in lower Fairfield County. Several zip codes in Fairfield Country are amongst the wealthiest in the United States. Other wealthy areas above the state average include the suburbs surrounding Hartford and New Haven, many of the towns along coastal Connecticut, and areas of Litchfield County. Among Connecticut's eight counties, Windham had an average per capita income below the average county in the United States.

== Counties ==
Rank	County	Per capita income	Median household income	Median family income	Population	Number of households
1	Fairfield	$48,295	$87,268	$109,593	916,829	335,545
2	Litchfield	$45,848	$79,639	$94,890	189,927	76,640
3	Tolland	$41,108	$78,175	$89,631	152,691	54,477
	Connecticut	$36,775	$67,740	$84,170	3,574,097	1,371,087
4	Middlesex	$35,848	$69,639	$84,890	189,927	76,640
5	Hartford	$33,151	$62,590	$78,599	894,014	350,854
6	New London	$32,888	$65,419	$80,425	274,055	107,057
7	New Haven	$31,720	$61,114	$77,379	862,477	334,502
	United States	$27,334	$51,914	$62,982	308,745,538	116,716,292
8	Windham	$26,585	$59,370	$69,642	118,428	45,724

== Planning Regions ==
In 2022, the U.S. Census Bureau recognized the state's nine Councils of Governments (coterminous with planning regions) as replacement for the state's eight legacy counties for all statistical purposes. Full implementation will be completed by 2024.

Rank	Region	Per capita income	Median household income	Median family income	Population	Number of households
1	Western Connecticut	$76,090	$118,930	$155,651	623,690	230,507
2	Lower Connecticut River Valley	$54,712	$99,742	$125,607	176,622	73,084
3	Northwest Hills	$52,279	$87,971	$104,909	113,234	45,976
	Connecticut	$52,034	$90,213	$115,183	3,626,205	1,409,807
4	Greater Bridgeport	$48,201	$83,147	$108,315	327,286	117,497
5	Capitol Region	$47,802	$88,190	$114,519	981,447	386,549
6	South Central Connecticut	$46,781	$83,617	$109,402	573,244	226,154
7	Naugatuck Valley	$44,275	$82,939	$100,815	454,083	177,656
8	Southeastern Connecticut	$43,292	$80,330	$99,776	280,403	113,810
	United States	$41,261	$75,149	$92,148	333,287,557	116,716,292
9	Northeastern Connecticut	$40,723	$83,119	$91,222	96,196	38,574

== Incorporated county subdivisions ==
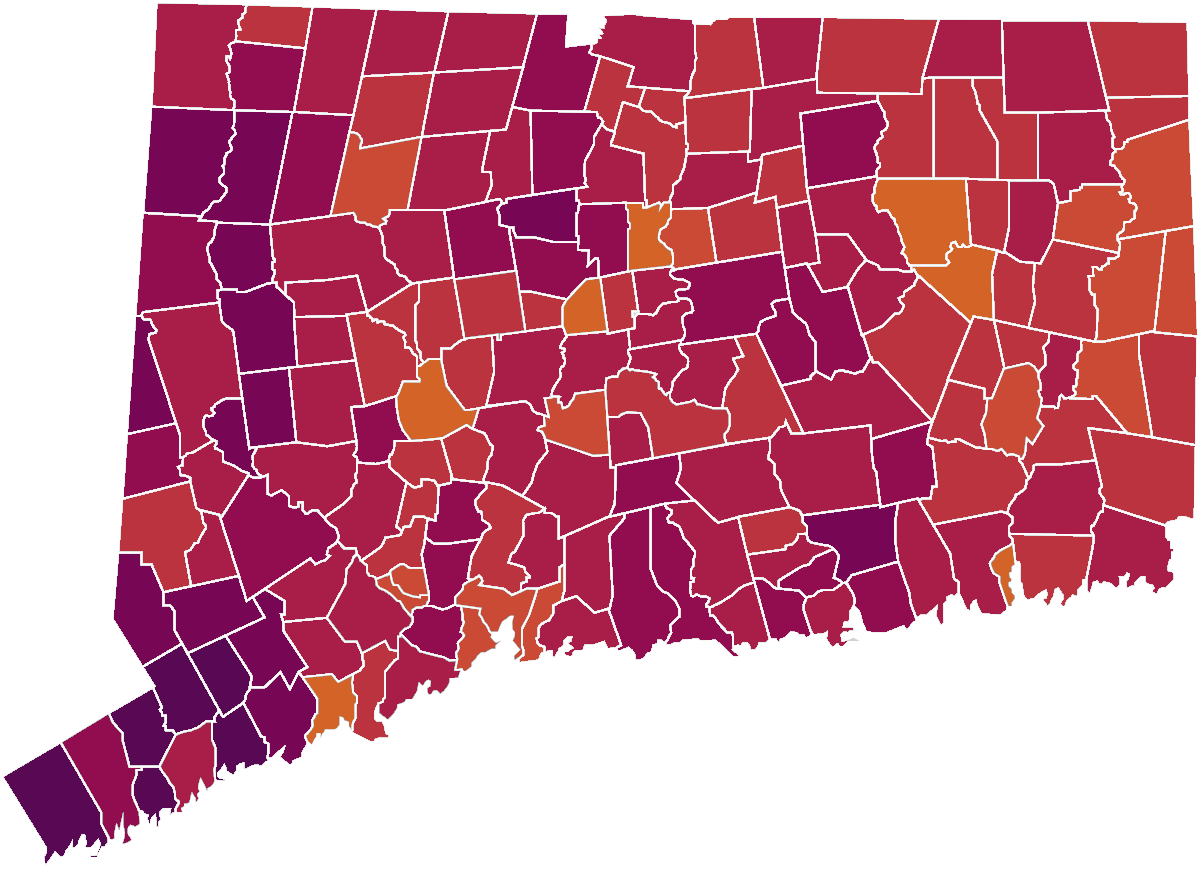
Map of municipalities by per capita income (ACS 2015-2019). Areas with higher income are shaded more purple, areas with lower income are shaded more orange.

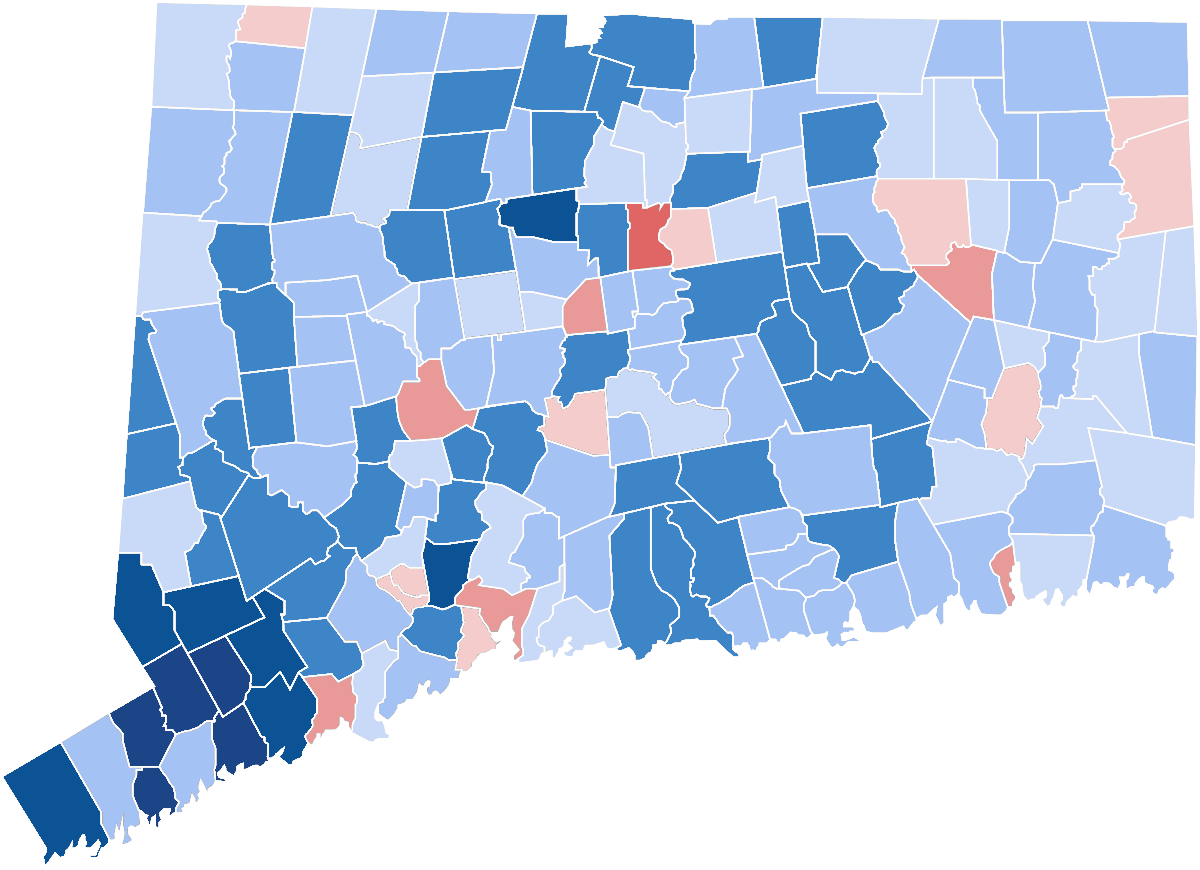
Map of municipalities by median household income (ACS 2015-2019). Areas with higher income are shaded more blue, areas with lower income are shaded more red.

Place	Type	County	Planning Region	Per capita income	Median household income	Median family income	Population	Number of households
New Canaan	Town	Fairfield	Western CT	$105,846	$174,611	$211,875	19,738	6,857
Darien	Town	Fairfield	Western CT	$105,846	$208,848	$343,456	20,732	6,555
Greenwich	Town	Fairfield	Western CT	$90,087	$128,153	$167,825	61,171	22,083
Weston	Town	Fairfield	Western CT	$92,794	$219,868	$285,612	10,179	3,379
Westport	Town	Fairfield	Western CT	$97,395	$181,360	$237,353	26,391	9,740
Glastonbury	Town	Hartford	Capitol Region	$84,200	$130,837	$192,018	34,564	13,121
Ridgefield	Town	Fairfield	Western CT	$75,634	$163,954	$182,820	24,638	8,902
Wilton	Town	Fairfield	Western CT	$78,131	$180,313	$205,902	18,062	5,953
Brookfield	Town	Fairfield	Western CT	$63,411	$132,950	$172,383	17,550	6,584
Avon	Town	Hartford	Capitol Region	$89,357	$146,153	$159,405	18,871	7,318
Redding	Town	Fairfield	Western CT	$61,043	$137,916	$152,344	9,158	3,528
Roxbury	Town	Litchfield	Northwest Hills	$68,446	$96,875	$112,045	2,262	922
Fenwick	Borough	Middlesex	Lower CT River Valley	$67,318	$148,650	$217,583	2,406	1,077
Stonington	Borough	New London	Southeastern CT	$55,429	$66,705	$88,194	929	508
Easton	Town	Fairfield	Greater Bridgeport	$58,532	$131,189	$149,884	7,490	2,682
Bridgewater	Town	Litchfield	Western CT	$66,035	$98,424	$113,088	1,727	753
Essex	Town	Middlesex	Lower CT River Valley	$53,427	$86,376	$121,447	6,683	2,992
Lyme	Town	New London	Lower CT River Valley	$66,822	$123,894	$162,438	18,098	7,024
Fairfield	Town	Fairfield	Greater Bridgeport	$60,155	$122,306	$152,760	59,404	20,233
Tolland	Town	Tolland	Capitol Region	$45,901	$110,593	$122,299	15,502	5,238
Old Lyme	Town	New London	Lower CT River Valley	$46,429	$87,025	$112,588	7,603	3,145
Madison	Town	New Haven	South Central CT	$52,413	$107,183	$136,981	18,269	6,779
Guilford	Town	New Haven	South Central CT	$65,609	$124,793	$150,902	22,019	8,786
Washington	Town	Litchfield	Northwest Hills	$70,264	$81,354	$89,441	3,578	1,466
Kent	Town	Litchfield	Northwest Hills	$34,015	$60,714	$94,271	2,979	1,104
Cornwall	Town	Litchfield	Northwest Hills	$49,753	$75,833	$91,458	1,420	568
Farmington	Town	Hartford	Capitol Region	$52,341	$91,712	$120,026	25,340	10,343
Woodbridge	Town	New Haven	South Central CT	$58,594	$133,412	$160,313	8,990	3,084
Warren	Town	Litchfield	Northwest Hills	$49,142	$87,857	$94,583	1,461	601
Sherman	Town	Fairfield	Western CT	$63,914	$108,398	$115,149	3,581	1,427
Salisbury	Town	Litchfield	Northwest Hills	$53,332	$82,794	$112,778	3,741	1,518
Bethany	Town	New Haven	South Central CT	$47,241	$113,720	$121,701	5,563	1,971
Granby	Town	Hartford	Capitol Region	$46,687	$97,500	$111,339	11,282	4,194
Canton	Town	Hartford	Capitol Region	$46,401	$87,643	$101,793	10,292	4,150
Killingworth	Town	Middlesex	Lower CT River Valley	$45,404	$99,500	$108,232	6,525	2,474
Newtown	Town	Fairfield	Western CT	$45,308	$108,148	$120,507	27,560	9,459
Orange	Town	New Haven	South Central CT	$44,983	$102,255	$115,685	13,956	5,123
Middlebury	Town	New Haven	Naugatuck Valley	$44,850	$100,866	$109,750	7,575	2,748
Stamford	City	Fairfield	Western CT	$44,667	$75,579	$88,050	122,643	47,357
Woodbury	Town	Litchfield	Naugatuck Valley	$44,060	$80,595	$100,500	9,975	4,214
Trumbull	Town	Fairfield	Greater Bridgeport	$44,006	$102,059	$117,855	36,018	12,725
Newtown	Borough	Fairfield	Western CT	$43,916	$106,141	$109,821	1,941	696
Norfolk	Town	Litchfield	Northwest Hills	$43,866	$85,526	$98,098	1,709	720
Monroe	Town	Fairfield	Greater Bridgeport	$43,842	$109,727	$119,357	19,479	6,735
West Hartford	Town	Hartford	Capitol Region	$53,534	$98,530	$136,547	63,268	25,258
Old Saybrook	Town	Middlesex	Lower CT River Valley	$43,400	$79,985	$99,595	10,242	4,247
Burlington	Town	Hartford	Northwest Hills	$43,392	$115,341	$120,580	9,301	3,291
Sharon	Town	Litchfield	Northwest Hills	$43,317	$70,104	$74,313	2,782	1,250
Norwalk	City	Fairfield	Western CT	$43,303	$76,161	$93,009	85,603	33,217
Woodmont	Borough	New Haven	South Central CT	$43,149	$71,667	$99,423	1,488	691
Bolton	Town	Tolland	Capitol Region	$42,312	$89,432	$93,472	4,980	1,915
Stonington	Town	New London	Southeastern CT	$42,184	$72,445	$86,029	18,545	8,115
Cromwell	Town	Middlesex	Lower CT River Valley	$41,926	$82,012	$99,362	14,005	5,752
Oxford	Town	New Haven	Naugatuck Valley	$41,909	$107,500	$113,077	12,683	4,504
Simsbury	Town	Hartford	Capitol Region	$41,883	$99,764	$108,564	23,511	8,776
New Hartford	Town	Litchfield	Northwest Hills	$41,709	$80,718	$90,172	6,970	2,632
Marlborough	Town	Hartford	Capitol Region	$41,669	$108,232	$110,527	6,404	2,292
Litchfield	Town	Litchfield	Northwest Hills	$41,649	$78,750	$100,833	8,466	3,459
Branford	Town	New Haven	South Central CT	$41,540	$70,640	$86,696	28,026	12,739
Salem	Town	New London	Southeastern CT	$41,414	$95,000	$106,875	4,151	1,525
Suffield	Town	Hartford	Capitol Region	$41,098	$90,023	$99,855	15,735	5,155
Chester	Town	Middlesex	Lower CT River Valley	$40,783	$80,185	$89,760	3,994	1,714
East Granby	Town	Hartford	Capitol Region	$40,698	$77,596	$97,174	5,148	2,062
Litchfield	Borough	Litchfield	Northwest Hills	$40,635	$68,125	$81,875	1,258	548
Cheshire	Town	New Haven	Naugatuck Valley	$40,498	$107,936	$123,539	29,261	10,041
Prospect	Town	New Haven	Naugatuck Valley	$40,126	$86,526	$99,028	9,405	3,357
Southbury	Town	New Haven	Naugatuck Valley	$40,022	$68,041	$104,838	19,904	8,213
Bloomfield	Town	Hartford	Capitol Region	$39,738	$68,372	$84,583	20,486	8,554
Bethlehem	Town	Litchfield	Naugatuck Valley	$39,704	$82,899	$86,792	3,607	1,411
North Stonington	Town	New London	Southeastern CT	$39,588	$88,869	$96,125	5,297	2,052
Shelton	City	Fairfield	Naugatuck Valley	$39,579	$105,417	$110,583	41,141	14,190
Goshen	Town	Litchfield	Northwest Hills	$39,562	$76,705	$86,114	2,976	1,192
New Fairfield	Town	Fairfield	Western CT	$39,486	$101,067	$108,720	13,881	4,802
Hebron	Town	Tolland	Capitol Region	$39,416	$108,444	$112,894	9,686	3,398
Colebrook	Town	Litchfield	Northwest Hills	$39,324	$72,000	$85,833	1,485	589
Eastford	Town	Windham	Northeastern CT	$46,025	$100,673	$130,972	7,964	3,151
Portland	Town	Middlesex	Lower CT River Valley	$39,100	$86,661	$96,016	9,508	3,822
South Windsor	Town	Hartford	Capitol Region	$38,945	$88,350	$94,602	25,709	9,918
New Milford	Town	Litchfield	Western CT	$38,893	$84,824	$100,574	28,142	10,618
Andover	Town	Tolland	Capitol Region	$38,710	$84,274	$96,286	3,303	1,244
Milford	City	New Haven	South Central CT	$38,489	$76,973	$92,684	52,759	21,708
Durham	Town	Middlesex	Lower CT River Valley	$38,341	$80,656	$97,211	39,559	7,152
Bozrah	Town	New London	Southeastern CT	$38,339	$75,000	$99,625	2,627	1,007
North Haven	Town	New Haven	South Central CT	$38,286	$83,588	$94,916	24,093	9,135
Westbrook	Town	Middlesex	Lower CT River Valley	$38,158	$61,069	$72,969	6,938	2,948
Berlin	Town	Hartford	Capitol Region	$38,134	$86,211	$98,677	19,866	7,808
Harwinton	Town	Litchfield	Northwest Hills	$37,902	$85,253	$92,083	5,642	2,170
Waterford	Town	New London	Southeastern CT	$37,690	$69,810	$91,893	19,517	8,005
Ledyard	Town	New London	Southeastern CT	$37,663	$85,321	$97,152	15,051	5,634
Wethersfield	Town	Hartford	Capitol Region	$37,329	$71,284	$91,563	26,668	11,204
Haddam	Town	Middlesex	Lower CT River Valley	$37,324	$86,179	$100,343	8,346	3,218
Ellington	Town	Tolland	Capitol Region	$37,322	$81,582	$95,547	15,602	6,257
Canaan	Town	Litchfield	Northwest Hills	$37,283	$54,219	$77,500	1,234	583
East Haddam	Town	Middlesex	Lower CT River Valley	$37,156	$82,695	$86,023	9,126	3,593
Clinton	Town	Middlesex	Lower CT River Valley	$37,117	$74,174	$82,839	13,260	5,303
East Lyme	Town	New London	Southeastern CT	$37,019	$79,815	$102,864	19,159	7,192
Hartland	Town	Hartford	Northwest Hills	$36,874	$85,956	$91,188	2,114	789
Columbia	Town	Tolland	Capitol Region	$36,784	$76,786	$93,295	1,749	690
Connecticut	State			$36,775	$67,740	$84,170	3,574,097	1,371,087
Middlefield	Town	Middlesex	Lower CT River Valley	$36,747	$80,392	$94,432	4,425	1,742
Morris	Town	Litchfield	Northwest Hills	$36,682	$81,583	$97,381	2,388	958
Bethel	Town	Fairfield	Western CT	$36,608	$83,483	$99,568	18,584	6,938
Woodstock	Town	Windham	Northeastern CT	$36,342	$74,000	$88,737	7,964	3,151
North Branford	Town	New Haven	South Central CT	$36,297	$80,618	$92,083	14,407	5,441
Southington	Town	Hartford	Capitol Region	$36,053	$77,673	$102,186	43,069	16,814
Rocky Hill	Town	Hartford	Capitol Region	$36,021	$72,417	$88,750	19,709	8,307
Windsor	Town	Hartford	Capitol Region	$35,780	$78,695	$90,856	29,044	11,233
Deep River	Town	Middlesex	Lower CT River Valley	$35,564	$65,250	$81,641	4,629	1,940
Colchester	Town	New London	Southeastern CT	$35,479	$92,431	$101,860	16,068	5,915
Somers	Town	Tolland	Capitol Region	$35,134	$98,977	$108,636	11,444	3,328
Barkhamsted	Town	Litchfield	Northwest Hills	$34,775	$87,656	$107,804	3,799	1,452
Hampton	Town	Windham	Northeastern CT	$34,642	$79,943	$84,079	1,863	747
Lebanon	Town	New London	Southeastern CT	$34,608	$72,431	$80,566	7,308	2,644
Hamden	Town	New Haven	South Central CT	$34,596	$66,695	$88,613	60,960	23,727
East Hampton	Town	Middlesex	Lower CT River Valley	$34,555	$88,281	$95,854	12,959	5,060
Coventry	Town	Tolland	Capitol Region	$34,524	$86,244	$91,931	12,435	4,783
Watertown	Town	Litchfield	Naugatuck Valley	$34,158	$77,771	$93,194	22,514	8,672
Pomfret	Town	Windham	Northeastern CT	$33,910	$68,278	$82,917	4,247	1,582
Wallingford	Town	New Haven	South Central CT	$33,839	$71,317	$87,641	45,135	18,032
Lisbon	Town	New London	Southeastern CT	$33,685	$77,872	$86,469	4,338	1,659
Wolcott	Town	New Haven	Naugatuck Valley	$33,572	$78,882	$90,061	16,680	6,007
Vernon	Town	Tolland	Capitol Region	$33,160	$61,103	$77,649	29,179	12,976
Preston	Town	New London	Southeastern CT	$32,956	$77,377	$86,435	4,726	1,869
Ashford	Town	Windham	Northeastern CT	$32,842	$69,407	$79,157	4,317	1,716
Voluntown	Town	New London	Northeastern CT	$32,760	$73,980	$76,197	2,603	1,002
Manchester	Town	Hartford	Capitol Region	$32,752	$61,571	$77,018	58,241	24,689
Beacon Falls	Town	New Haven	Naugatuck Valley	$32,710	$81,214	$93,056	6,049	2,360
Stratford	Town	Fairfield	Greater Bridgeport	$32,590	$67,530	$83,369	51,384	20,095
Newington	Town	Hartford	Capitol Region	$32,561	$69,085	$80,597	30,562	12,550
Seymour	Town	New Haven	Naugatuck Valley	$32,346	$71,719	$92,981	16,540	6,654
Chaplin	Town	Windham	Northeastern CT	$32,188	$62,679	$72,426	2,305	920
Union	Town	Tolland	Northeastern CT	$32,032	$79,911	$84,750	854	334
Thomaston	Town	Litchfield	Naugatuck Valley	$31,652	$63,990	$77,842	7,887	3,108
Franklin	Town	New London	Southeastern CT	$31,518	$74,226	$87,237	1,922	729
Danbury	City	Fairfield	Western CT	$31,461	$65,275	$74,420	80,893	28,907
Middletown	City	Middlesex	Lower CT River Valley	$31,348	$57,655	$78,006	47,648	19,863
Sprague	Town	New London	Southeastern CT	$31,226	$68,241	$78,438	2,984	1,135
East Windsor	Town	Hartford	Capitol Region	$31,162	$64,301	$76,502	11,162	4,750
Groton	Town	New London	Southeastern CT	$31,110	$56,904	$67,465	40,115	15,809
Plainville	Town	Hartford	Capitol Region	$31,000	$63,447	$80,205	17,716	7,580
Canterbury	Town	Windham	Northeastern CT	$30,453	$70,902	$84,093	5,132	1,934
Windsor Locks	Town	Hartford	Capitol Region	$30,436	$59,369	$70,439	12,498	5,223
Plymouth	Town	Litchfield	Naugatuck Valley	$30,081	$71,630	$82,438	12,243	4,803
Bristol	City	Hartford	Naugatuck Valley	$29,629	$58,537	$72,038	60,477	25,320
Willington	Town	Tolland	Capitol Region	$29,616	$62,500	$96,422	6,041	2,423
Griswold	Town	New London	Southeastern CT	$29,421	$59,295	$75,870	11,951	4,646
Scotland	Town	Windham	Northeastern CT	$29,371	$75,417	$79,722	1,726	637
Enfield	Town	Hartford	Capitol Region	$29,340	$67,402	$77,554	44,654	16,794
Groton	City	New London	Southeastern CT	$28,872	$49,464	$52,366	10,389	4,182
East Haven	Town	New Haven	South Central CT	$28,638	$59,918	$69,837	29,257	11,756
Montville	Town	New London	Southeastern CT	$28,492	$65,349	$80,156	19,571	6,942
Stafford	Town	Tolland	Capitol Region	$28,027	$64,494	$69,789	12,087	4,767
Naugatuck	Borough	New Haven	Naugatuck Valley	$27,933	$59,393	$71,021	31,862	12,339
Meriden	City	New Haven	South Central CT	$27,625	$53,873	$65,450	60,868	23,977
United States	Country			$27,334	$51,914	$62,982	308,745,538	116,716,292
Winchester	Town	Litchfield	Northwest Hills	$27,264	$57,958	$68,622	11,242	4,815
Thompson	Town	Windham	Northeastern CT	$27,222	$60,951	$74,613	9,458	3,730
Norwich	City	New London	Southeastern CT	$26,702	$52,186	$62,616	40,493	16,599
North Canaan	Town	Litchfield	Northwest Hills	$26,700	$46,417	$52,604	3,315	1,400
Putnam	Town	Windham	Northeastern CT	$26,506	$51,180	$61,168	9,584	3,950
Derby	City	New Haven	Naugatuck Valley	$26,264	$52,029	$58,984	12,902	5,388
Ansonia	City	New Haven	Naugatuck Valley	$26,225	$56,541	$71,329	19,249	7,510
Torrington	City	Litchfield	Northwest Hills	$25,948	$48,409	$64,476	36,383	15,243
West Haven	City	New Haven	South Central CT	$25,884	$51,854	$62,330	55,564	21,112
Sterling	Town	Windham	Northeastern CT	$25,557	$64,500	$74,405	3,830	1,383
Winsted	City	Litchfield	Northwest Hills	$25,291	$61,404	$68,406	7,712	3,346
Killingly	Town	Windham	Northeastern CT	$25,215	$53,192	$65,496	17,370	6,749
Brooklyn	Town	Windham	Northeastern CT	$25,124	$68,851	$76,224	8,210	2,989
Plainfield	Town	Windham	Northeastern CT	$24,825	$61,500	$69,096	15,405	5,726
East Hartford	Town	Hartford	Capitol Region	$24,373	$48,613	$57,848	51,252	20,195
Bantam	Borough	Litchfield	Lower CT River Valley	$24,284	$42,256	$54,063	759	372
Jewett City	Borough	New London	Southeastern CT	$23,876	$39,334	$55,781	3,487	1,466
Danielson	Borough	Windham	Northeastern CT	$22,798	$55,097	$56,831	4,051	1,627
New Haven	City	New Haven	South Central CT	$21,789	$38,963	$47,432	129,779	48,877
Mansfield	Town	Tolland	Capitol Region	$21,579	$65,839	$84,128	26,543	5,586
Waterbury	City	New Haven	Naugatuck Valley	$21,545	$40,254	$47,077	110,366	42,761
New London	City	New London	Southeastern CT	$21,110	$43,551	$49,811	27,620	10,373
New Britain	City	Hartford	Capitol Region	$21,056	$39,706	$45,990	73,206	28,158
Windham	Town	Windham	Southeastern CT	$20,272	$40,063	$48,145	25,268	8,906
Bridgeport	City	Fairfield	Greater Bridgeport	$19,854	$41,047	$47,894	144,229	51,255
Hartford	City	Hartford	Capitol Region	$16,798	$28,970	$32,820	124,775	45,124
