= Asenath Smith =

American woman forced to undergo an abortion (1797–1848)

- Born: 1797; Griswold, Connecticut, United States
- Died: 1848 (aged 50–51)

Asenath Caroline Smith (1797–1848) was an American woman whose experience being forced to undergo an abortion led to the first state abortion law being implemented in the United States.

== Biography ==
=== Early life ===
Smith was born in 1797 and grew up on a farm in Griswold, Connecticut. She and her younger sister Maria were raised by a single mother and lived with her and their maternal grandparents. Contemporary sources have described Smith as growing up in the "margins of society", though it is known that she did receive some education.

=== Relationship with Ammi Rogers ===
In 1815, Smith first met Ammi Rogers, a preacher, when he had visited the family home in Griswold to pray for her dying grandmother. Rogers had been educated at Yale University in nearby New Haven; he had initially been ordained by the Episcopal Church, but had been subsequently been excommunicated from the church due to his constant criticisms of his leadership. Rogers preached during the Second Great Awakening, a Protestant revival movement that saw travelling preachers gaining significant followings. Rogers was well known in New England for his at times controversial talks, with audiences for his sermons often reaching the hundreds.

By 1817, Smith and Rogers were in a sexual relationship; he was two decades older than her. Their relationship was tolerated by Smith's family, who permitted Rogers to stay in the family home. Rogers had declared his "ardent and honourable affection" for Smith and had promised to marry her; sexual relationships were permitted by some families on the understanding that the couple would marry eventually.

=== Pregnancy and abortion ===
Later that year, Smith discovered she was pregnant. Rogers expressed concern that the pregnancy would ruin his reputation and his career, stating that even if he and Smith married immediately, the baby would be born before their nine-month anniversary, alerting the public to the fact that Rogers and Smith had premarital sex. Rogers promised to marry Smith if she aborted the pregnancy. While not explicitly stated at the time, it was widely understood that women could procure abortions through remedies provided by midwives; however, Rogers opted to perform the abortion himself, first providing Smith with an abortifacient. After four days, when this had worked, Rogers used a tool in an attempt to "penetrate the womb". He subsequently left Griswold in order to preach at a nearby town; Smith's family sought medical attention from a doctor who confirmed that she was in labour. Smith gave birth to a stillborn child, with it estimated that Smith had been between four and six months pregnant.

At some point after the birth, Smith moved with Rogers to Massachusetts, where they lived for several months, with Rogers indicating he would propose to her. When this did not happen, Smith ended the relationship and returned to Connecticut.

== Rogers' trial and subsequent conviction ==
=== Pre-trial events ===
The doctor present at the birth stated that it was clear that the stillbirth had been caused by an attempted abortion; news of this, and Rogers role in Smith's pregnancy and the abortion spread around Connecticut. In late 1817, the District Attorney of Connecticut was formally asked to investigate the incident. Smith, who by this point had returned to Connecticut from Massachusetts, gave an account of what happened to the attorney, which was confirmed by her family. The decision was made to progress the matter to trial.

Rogers delayed the trial over two years while he sought witnesses for his defence. During that time, he kidnapped Smith and her sister Maria, one of the only witnesses to their sexual relationship; he sought to convince both women not to testify against him.

=== Trial ===
The trial against Rogers initially commenced in January 1820; however, it quickly ended when he and the Smith sisters could not be located. The district attorney successfully argued that the trial should still go ahead, citing the testimonies previously given by Smith in 1817, claiming that Rogers had deliberately taken the sisters out of the jurisdiction to prevent them from testifying. After Rogers and the Smith sisters were located, the trial recommenced in October 1820.

During the trial, Smith refused to testify against Rogers. However, her sister did, as did her grandfather, Elisha Geer, who confirmed that Rogers and Smith had been in a sexual relationship, which he had permitted on the assumption that they would eventually marry. A further key testimony came from a slave identified as "Sam the Negro", who reported as having seen Smith and Rogers in bed together. Rogers' defence argued that Smith had only given her initial testimony in 1817 after being threatened with a "public whipping", and stated that the stillbirth was not caused by an abortion but rather "could have been produced by sickness, infirmity or accident in the mother".

At the culmination of the trial, Rogers was charged with "high crime and misdemeanour in a brutal and high handed assault upon the body of Asenath Caroline Smith". Due to there being no law against forcing a person to undergo an abortion, Rogers was instead convicted of sexual assault and sentenced to two years imprisonment in a local jail.

== Subsequent events ==
The trial of Rogers was reported in the local press, though did not receive much attention outside of Connecticut. The Norwich Courier described the proceedings as "a trial in which so much baseness and cold calculating depravity of heart were disclosed". The fact that there was no specific law criminalising forced abortion led to the Connecticut legislature passing the Crime and Punishment Act on 22 May 1821, which included a section on "administering poison with the intent to murder, or cause miscarriage". This marked the first state law passed in the United States that prohibited abortion, and was notable for punishing the perpetrator of the abortion, as opposed to the mother. While the initial inspiration of the law was to prevent men from hiding sexual misbehaviour, in practice it significantly impacted midwives who had previously informally provided abortions to women as part of their service.

Smith largely disappeared from the public record after the conclusion of the trial; she is reported to have died in 1848. In 1846, Rogers published his memoirs, which detailed his relationship with Smith and his trial, in which he maintained his innocence.

== Legacy ==
It has been suggested that the case of Asenath Smith was the inspiration for the 1850 novel The Scarlet Letter by Nathaniel Hawthorne; Hawthorne was known to have mutual friends with the Smith family.
