= Kinne Cemetery =

Historic site in New London County, Connecticut

- U.S. National Register of Historic Places
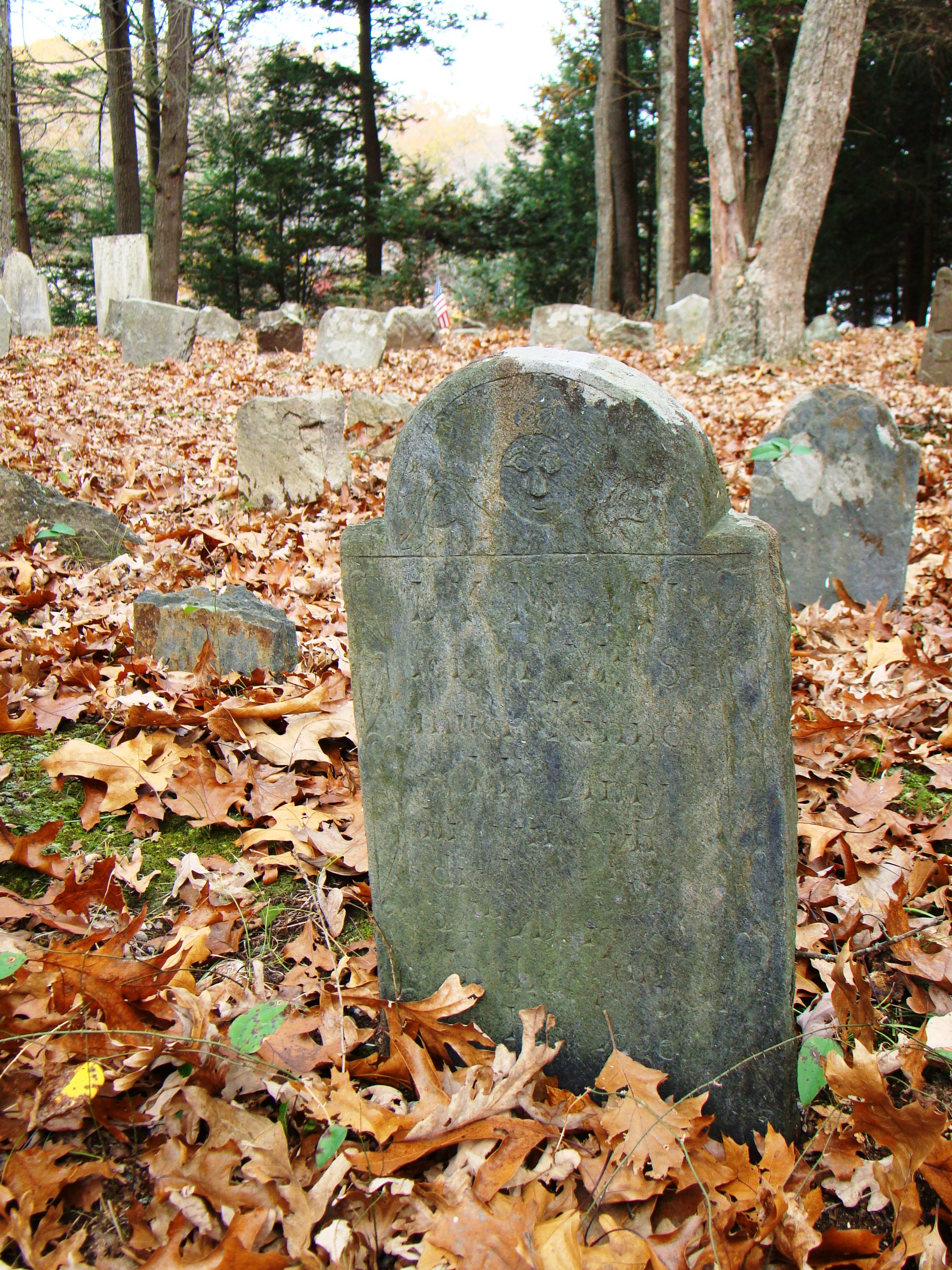

- Location within Connecticut Location within the United States
- Location: Jarvis Road, Griswold, Connecticut
- Coordinates: 41°33′24″N 71°53′15″W
- Area: 0.8 acres (0.32 ha)
- Built: 1713
- NRHP reference No.: 01000351
- Added to NRHP: April 12, 2001

Kinne Cemetery, also known as the Glasgo Cemetery and Old Kinne Burying Ground, is a historic cemetery in Jarvis Road in Griswold, Connecticut. The earliest marked stone is for Daniel Kinne who died in 1713. In the 1930s, the inscriptions of 79 stones in the Kinne Cemetery were recorded for the Hale Index. There are around 80 fieldstones with no carving or identification, but it is unknown if this stems from wearing of the gneiss stone or that there were no skilled carvers locally available. The seven carvers that have been identified are Lebbeus Kimball, Jotham Warren, Josiah Manning, Peter Barker, Mr. Huntington of Lebanon, E. Marston of Mystic Bridge and O. Doty of Stonington. The National Historic Register of Places nomination notes, "the cemetery is significant artistically because the carving on the stones gives many good examples of the funerary art that was characteristic of the 18th and 19th centuries in New England." The cemetery is notable because of the burial of Isaac C. Glasko, the namesake of the village of Glasgo, and a prominent African American land-holding man who ran a blacksmith shop that was important to the marine industry of the area. The cemetery was made a part of the Connecticut Freedom Trail in 1995 and it was added to the National Register of Historic Places on April 12, 2001.

== History ==
Established around 1713, the Kinne Cemetery is one of eighteen family cemeteries in Griswold. It rests upon the land of Joseph Kinne, who came to Griswold from Salem, Massachusetts in 1704 and includes the land of Thomas Kinne, also came from Salem in 1714. The exact date of its founding is unknown, but the earliest extant stone is for Daniel Kinne, died 1713. According to the National Register of Historic Places nomination, the cemetery was an active burial site for the Kinne family, including those of married Kinne daughters, until the interment of Clark Robbins Cook in 1912. However, the Hale Index lists the last marked interment as that of Herbert Kinney, died August 24, 1916. Gravestone carvers identified in the burial ground include Richard Kimball and his son Chester Kimball, John Huntington, the Manning Family of Windham, and Jotham Warren.

In order to improve and enlarge the cemetery, the Kinne Historical and Genealogical Society was incorporated by special act of the Connecticut General Assembly in 1884. In 1887, the land adjacent to the Glasgo Pond was purchased by the society, though the boundary of 168 feet (51 m) by 170 feet (52 m) does not match the town's record. The land's grantor, Nathan B. Lewis, purchased the land thirty years prior in 1857 from a Kinne family connection, Alexander Steward. According to the Town of Griswold's records, the property is designated as "map 78, block 136, lot 3". In the 1930s, the inscriptions of 79 stones in the Kinne Cemetery were recorded for the Hale Index. According to another study, 71 of the 74 interments are related by blood or marriage to the Kinne family.

In the Summer of 1999, a group of volunteers worked to restore and clean up the cemetery that led to a ceremony in October 1999 with more than 60 people in attendance. The article in The Day highlighted the difficulty in finding the cemetery which is located on the banks of the Pachaug River, in the village of Glasgo, located in the town of Griswold. Iva Arpin said that the town would repair the stone walls and that the Children of the American Revolution would return in the spring to continue their work on the cemetery. In 2002, the cemetery had undergone a significant restoration which included the unearthing and accounting for all the burial markers that had been strewn about the grounds. Arpin noted that some of the stones showed signs of vandalism. The Day described how some of the marker stones and monuments were covered in nearly a foot of pine needles and that the roots had uprooted the anchor stones causing the headstones to fall and break.

By 2007, concerns about public use of the land for recreation and reflection had provoked concern from Kinne descendants, but there is little that descendants could do. The grounds were once under the control of the Kinne Family Historical Society, but it was disbanded "generations ago" and the town owns the cemetery by default. The cemetery had been disturbed by the gravestones being stacked to "help climbers reach their optimum height before swinging" from a rope on a tree into the pond. Pieces of the wall and a gravestone had been thrown towards the pond and came to rest on a ledge. Courtland Kinne, a descendant of Thomas Kinne, wants a jersey barrier erected to stop vehicles from parking next to the gravestones, the wrought iron fence around the burial ground and the trees within the grounds to be removed because their roots could disturb the plots.

== Importance ==
The Kinne Cemetery shows the evolution of funerary art over the course of the centuries. The earliest marked stone is for Daniel Kinne who died in 1713. Daniel Kinne's stone has a simple rounded top with only his name carved into it.

== Interments ==
This is an alphabetical list of interments recorded from the Hale Index survey with all data stemming from a copy of the Charles R. Hale Collection of Cemetery Inscriptions. Additional field stones are noted, but were not listed in the Hale Collection. According to the National Historic Register, names are missing from this list, including Isaac C. Glasko (1776–1861) who was "of mixed Indian and Negro blood." The listing here is not complete because the records of many field stones were incomplete and did not contain identification, including the earliest stone for Daniel Kinne who died in 1713. Kinne's stone only had the name carved.

First Name	Last Name	Born	Died	Age	Notes
Olver	Bordman		October 3, 1777	9 months	Son of Daved and Jemime
Clark R.	Cook	December 6, 1835	May 28, 1832	42	
Elizabeth	Cook		May 28, 1832	42	
Betsey	Crary		January 30, 1856	65	Widow of George Crary
George	Crary		August 25, 1831	48	
Charles E.	Fletcher		June 29, 1870	20	Son of John W. and Sarah J. Fletcher
John W.	Fletcher		March 1, 1895	67	
Sarah	Huston				Fieldstone
Hugh	Kennedy		October 31, 1778	86 (about)	
John	Kennedy		May 12, 1752	50	
Abby Robbins	Kinne		February 8, 1868	82	Wife of Sterry
Abigal	Kinne				Field stone
Capt. Ezra	Kinne		February 8, 1795	66	
Capt. James	Kinne		November 4, 1807	72	No marker
Capt. Joseph	Kinne		July 12, 1745	67	
Daniel	Kinne		1713		Field stone.
Edwin Byron	Kinne		October 23, 1845	20 years, 7 months	Son of Sterry and Abby Kinne
Elizabeth	Kinne		November 20, 1823	76	2nd wife of Capt. James Kinne
Eunice	Kinne				Field Stone
Gideon	Kinne		February 25, 1802	78	
Gideon	Kinne		May 3, 1753	2	Gideon and Thankfull Kinne
Hannah	Kinne		August 7, 1791	40–49	Wife of Capt. James, the second digit of age is unreadable
Hannah	Kinne				Field stone
Jonas	Kinne		May 6, 1766	13	Son of Gideon and Thankfull
Joseph	Kinne		July 15, 1777	0–1	Son of Samuel and Amy Kinne, died in first year
Joseph	Kinne		1777		Field Stone
Keziah	Kinne				Wife of Capt. Joseph Kinne
Lydia	Kinne				Field Stone
Lydia	Kinne		1751		Field Stone
Lyman	Kinne		October 24, 1788	3	Son of Samuel and Amy
Sally	Kinne		February 22, 1797	10–19 years	Samuel and Amy, second digit of age is unreadable.
Sally	Kinne		May 20, 1825	44	Wife of Sterry Kinne
Sarah	Kinne				Field Stone
Sarah	Kinne		March 1, 1792	58	Wife of Ezra Kinne
Solomon	Kinne		July 4, 1799	22	
Stery	Kinne		November 29, 1830	50	
Thankfull	Kinne		December 29, 1798	72	Wife of Gideon
Andrew	Kinney		December 1, 1826	35	
Archibald	Kinney	April 16, 1815	Mar. 29, 1904	88	Husband of Emily Boardman Kinney
Betsy	Kinney		February 9, 1849	84	Widow of Lot Kinney
Elisha	Kinney		April 11, 1848	65	
Emily Boardman	Kinney	Oct. 23, 1820	Dec. 5, 1877	62	Wife of Archibald Kinney
Gideon	Kinney	August 9, 1790	June 13, 1875	84	
Hannah	Kinney		May 21, 1817	36	Daughter of Jacob and Lydia
Herbert	Kinney	March 28, 1847	Aug. 24, 1916	69	
Jacob	Kinney		May 1, 1813	56	
James	Kinney		October 11, 1834	25	Son of Sterry and Sally Kinney
Lot	Kinney		May 30, 1825	60	
Lydia	Kinney		August 29, 1832	73	Widow of Jacob Kinney
Mary E.	Kinney		October. 29, 1850	18	Daughter of Elisha and Rebecca Kinney
Pierpont	Kinney		February 1, 1829	31	
Charles	Rix		November 12, 1837	1 month, 9 days	Name illegible, but may be Charles H. – Son of Ephraim B. and Lucy
Marcy	Scranton		June 14, 1837	58	Wife of Thomas
Alexander	Stewart		November 16, 1849	64 years, 5 months, 11 days.	
Thomas	Stewart		September 9, 1834	48 years, 4 months, 18 days	
Thomas	Stuwart		August 13, 1783	3	Son of Alexander and Thankfull

== Gallery ==
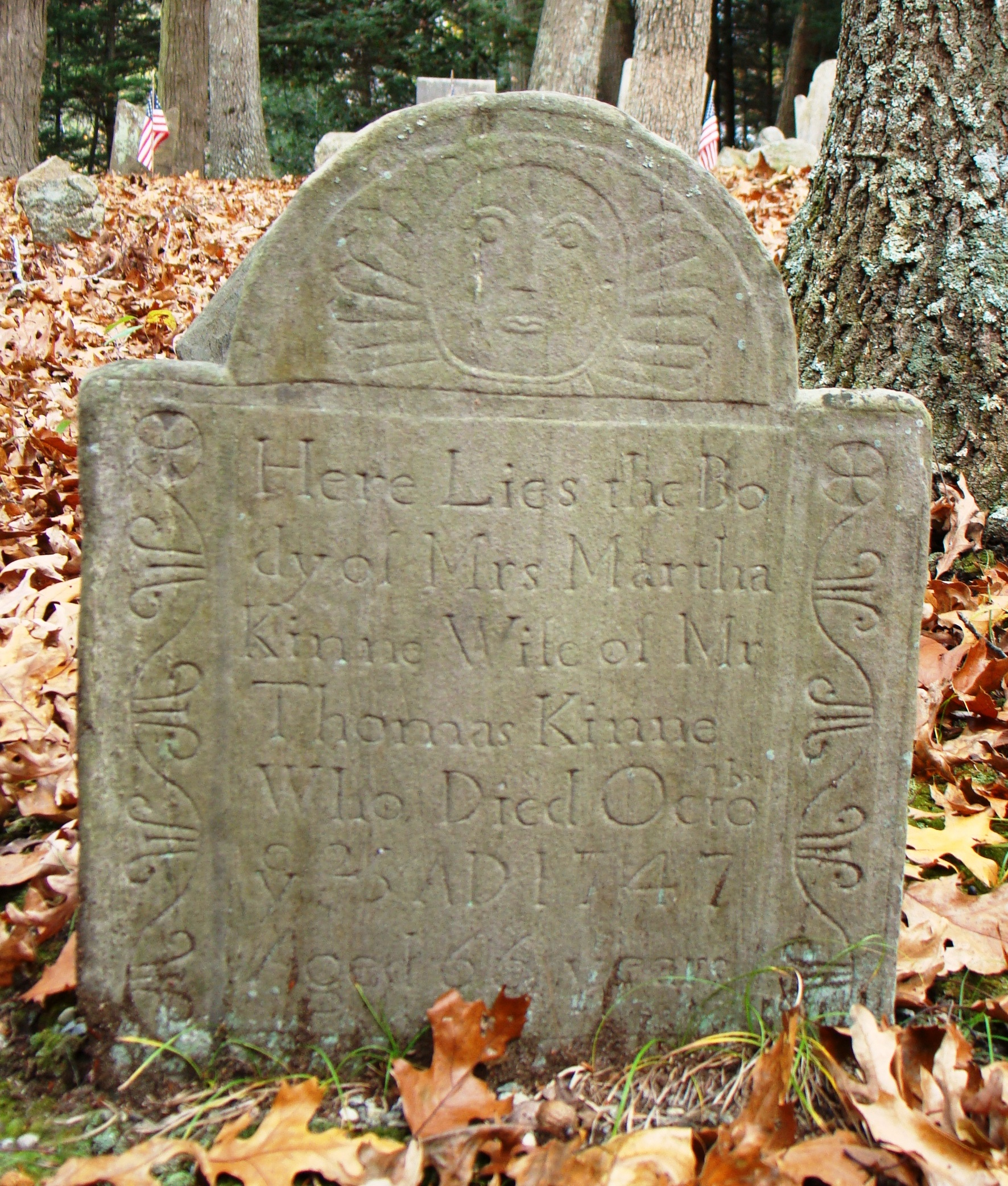
1747 stone

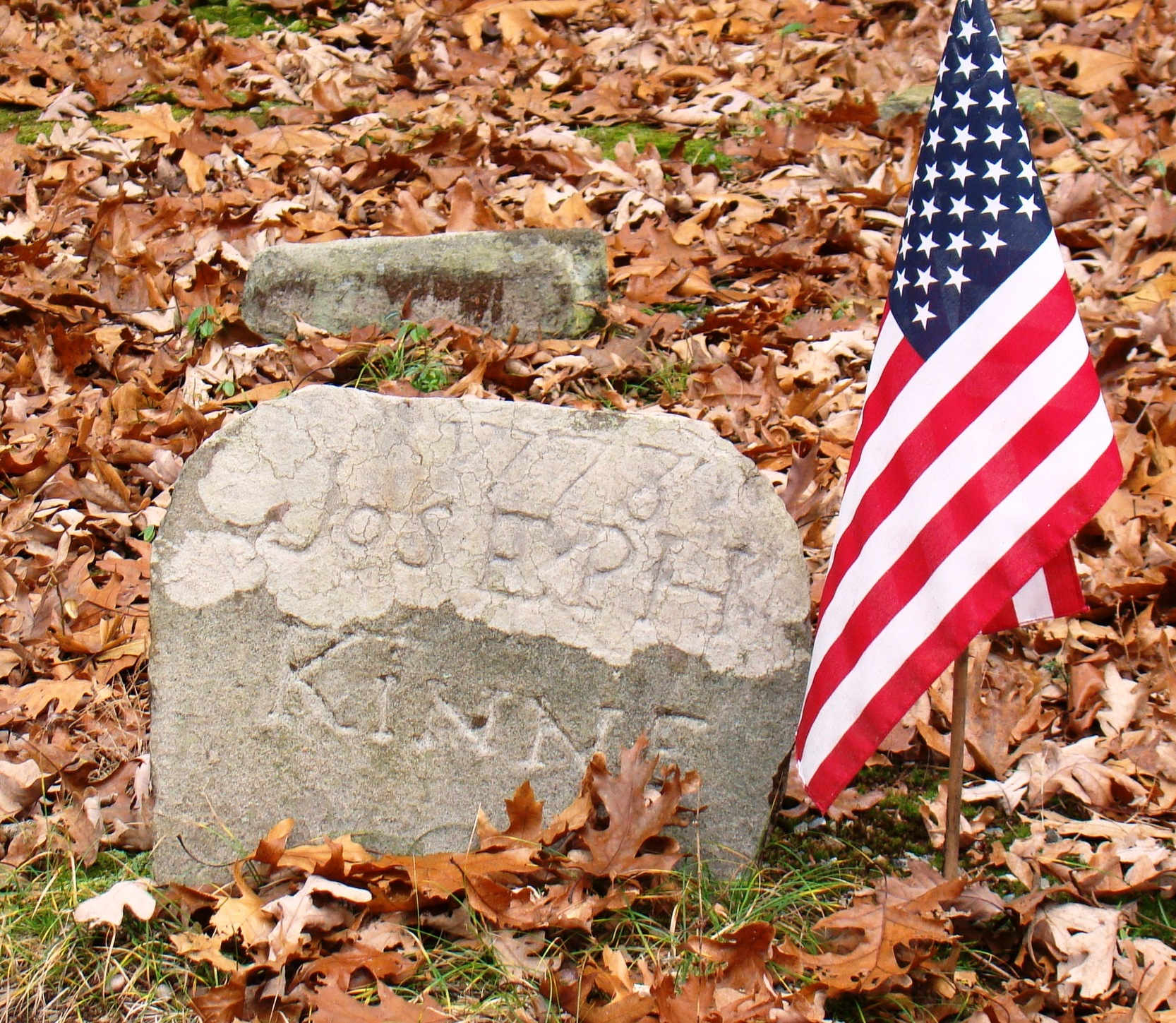
1773 stone

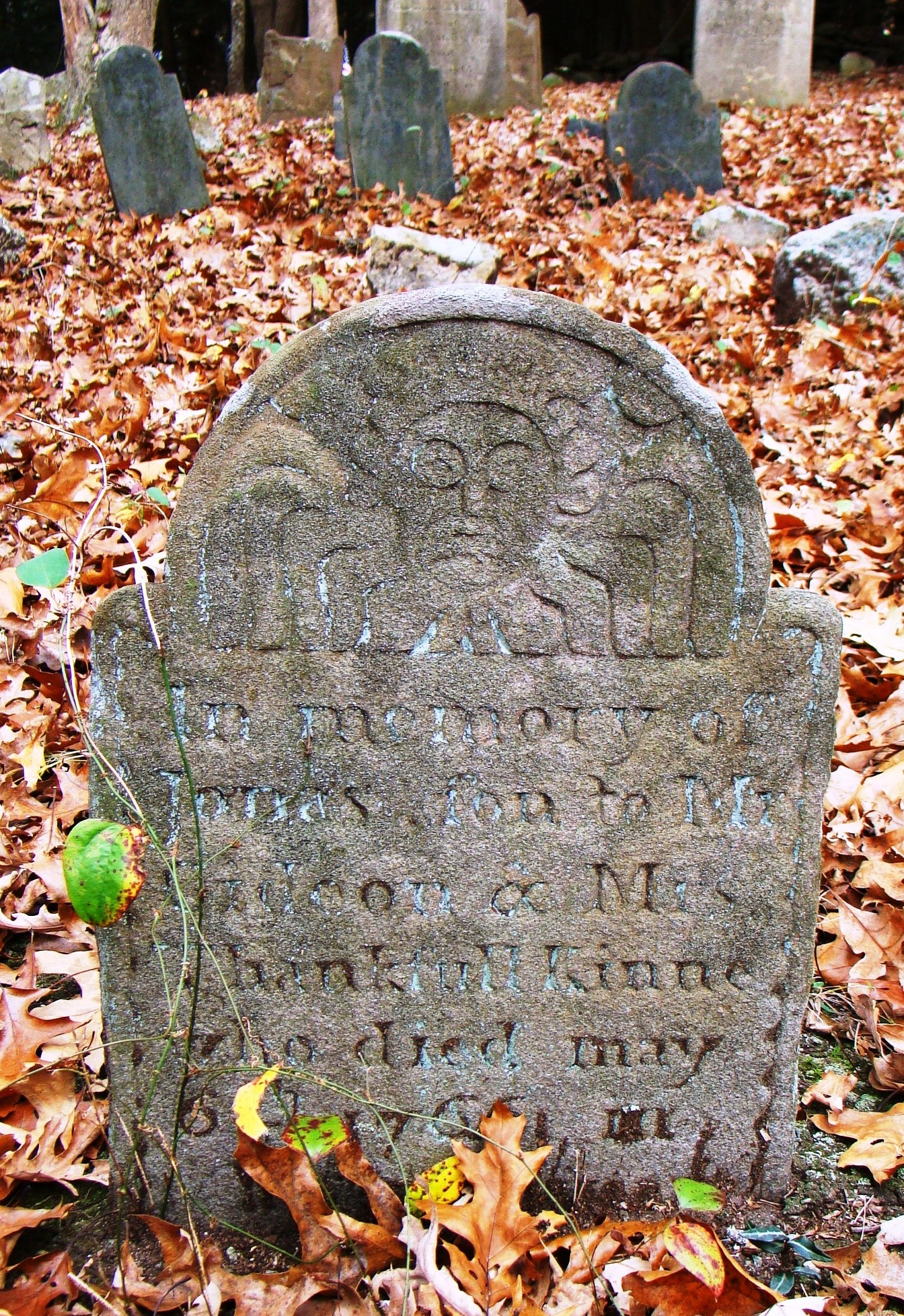
1766 ecclesiastical stone

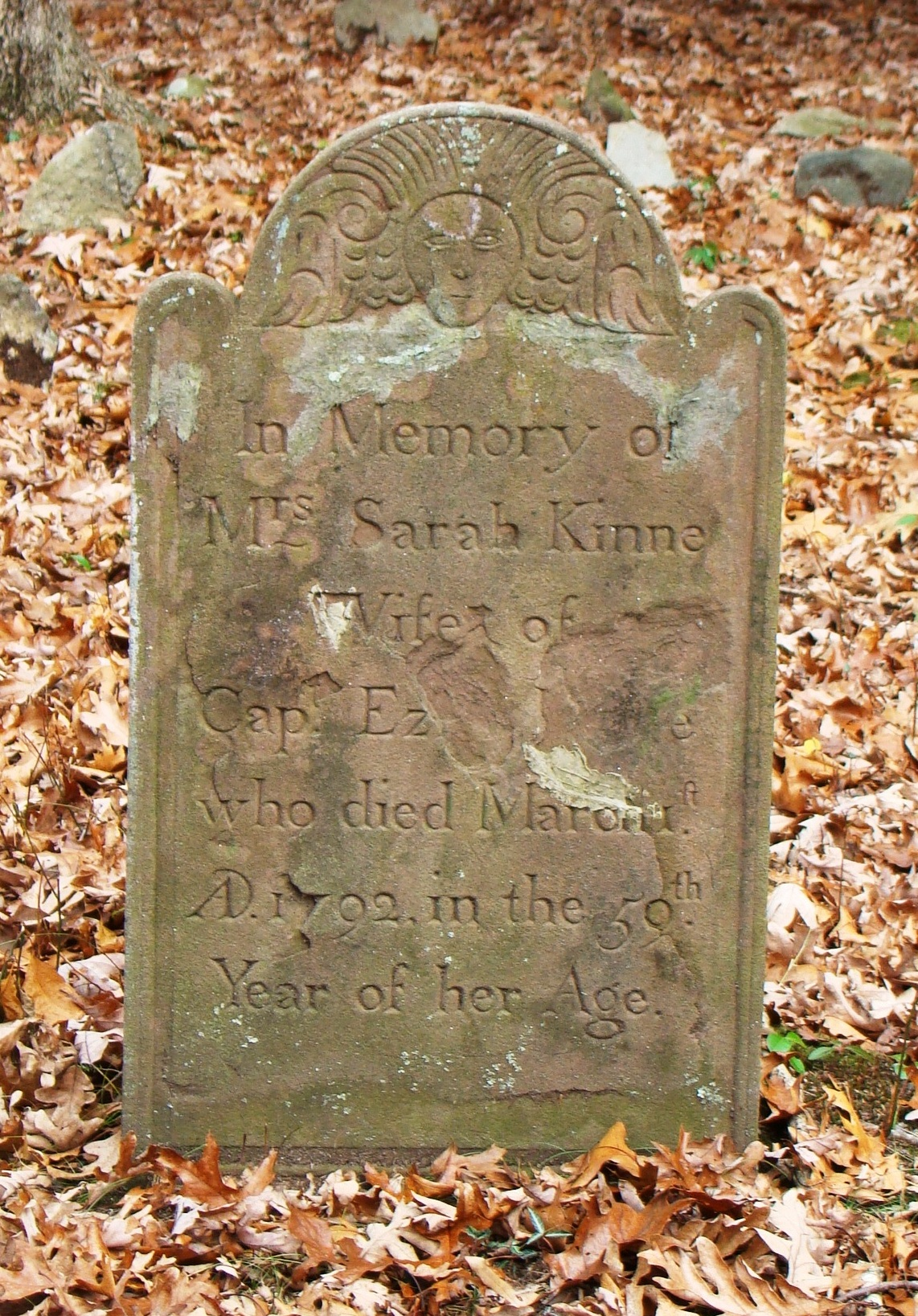
1792 gravestone.

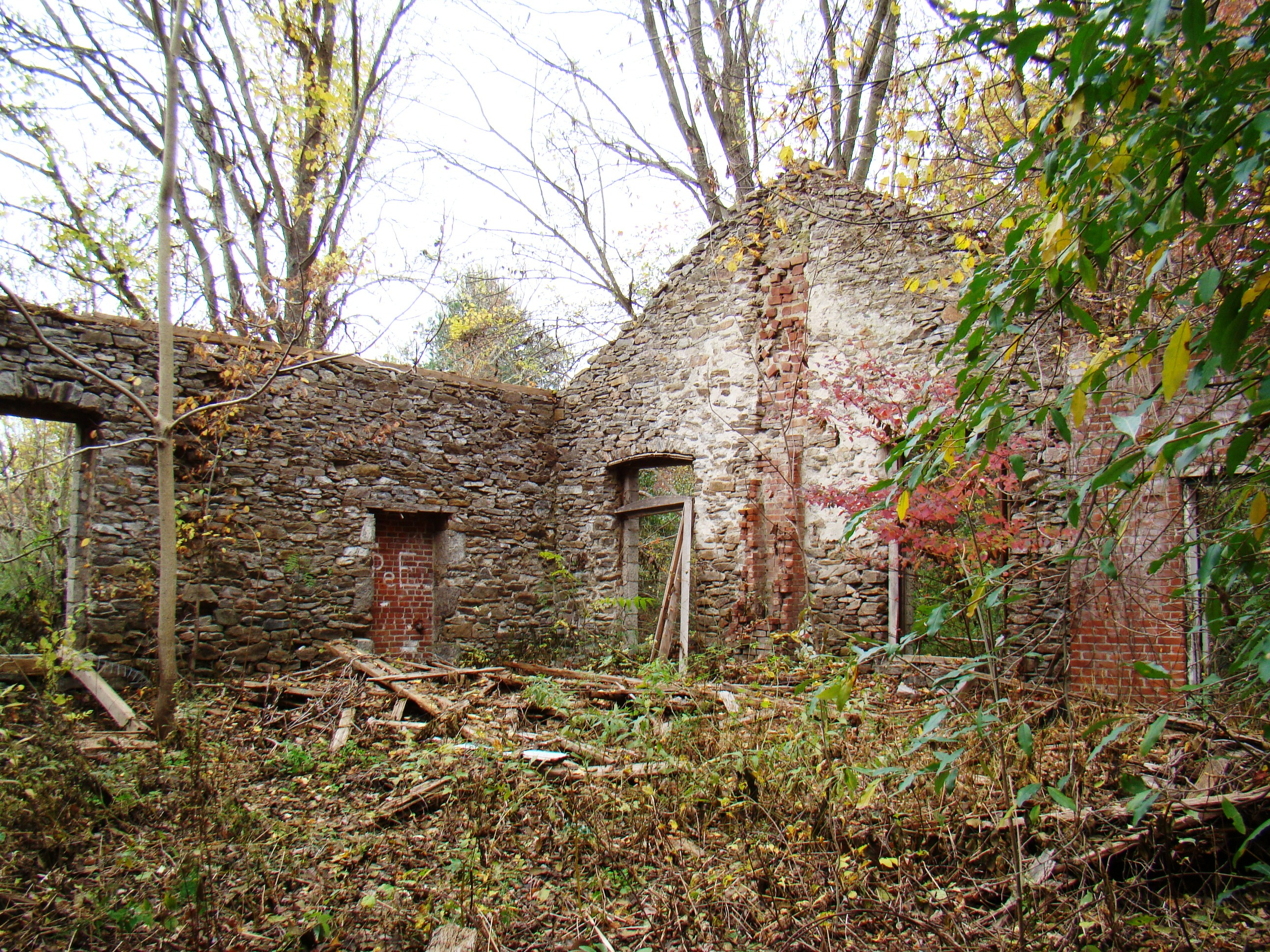
Ruins of an old mill site adjacent to the cemetery, once powered by the creek.

== See also ==
- National Register of Historic Places listings in New London County, Connecticut
