= Timothy Lester Farmstead =

Historic house in Connecticut, United States

- U.S. National Register of Historic Places
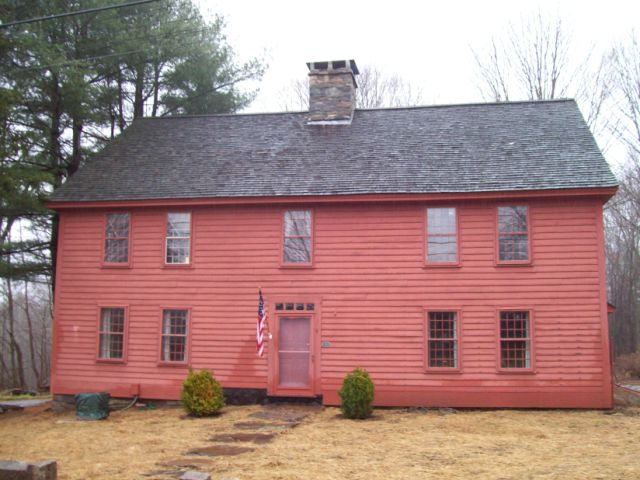

- Location within Connecticut Location within the United States
- Location: Junction of Crary, Browning and Terry Roads, Griswold, Connecticut
- Coordinates: 41°34′3″N 71°57′32″W
- Area: 43 acres (17 ha)
- Built: 1741
- Architectural style: Colonial
- NRHP reference No.: 98001441
- Added to NRHP: December 4, 1998

The Timothy Lester Farmstead, also known as the Garrison House, is a historic farmstead at Crary and Browning Roads in Griswold, Connecticut. Set on 43 acres (17 ha) of land, the farmstead retains the look and feel of an 18th-century farm property, with a c. 1741 farmhouse, and farm outbuildings dating from the 18th to 20th centuries. The property was listed on the National Register of Historic Places on December 4, 1998.

== Description and history ==
The Timothy Lester Farmstead is located in a rural setting of southern Griswold, at the junction of Crary and Browning Roads. The surviving 43 acres (of a once-larger farm property) are still lined with stone walls, and the farmstead itself is the only visible built intrusion on the landscape, which is gradually reverting to woodlands. The centerpiece of the farm complex is a 2 1/2-story wood-frame house, five bays wide, with a large central chimney. It was built in stages beginning c. 1741, and includes a two-story ell extending to the rear. It has an unusually large kitchen hearth with two beehive ovens. Adjacent to the house are a small wellhouse of great antiquity and an 18th-century barn. Across Crary Road from the house is another barnyard which includes several outbuildings in addition to a 19th-century barn.

The property's agricultural development dates to about 1741, the year in which Mehitable Belcher married Timothy Lester. The property had been purchased from Mohegan natives in the 17th century, and acquired by Moses Belcher about 1720. The Lester family was prominent in area civic affairs, and this house served as a garrison and training ground during the American Revolutionary War. The Lester children were all signatories to documents petitioning for the separation of Griswold from Preston, which took place in 1815. The property was sold out of the Lester family in 1857, but remained in agricultural use until the mid-20th century.

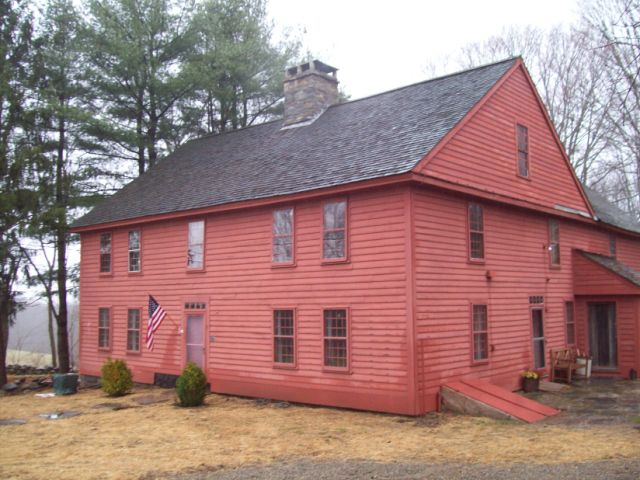

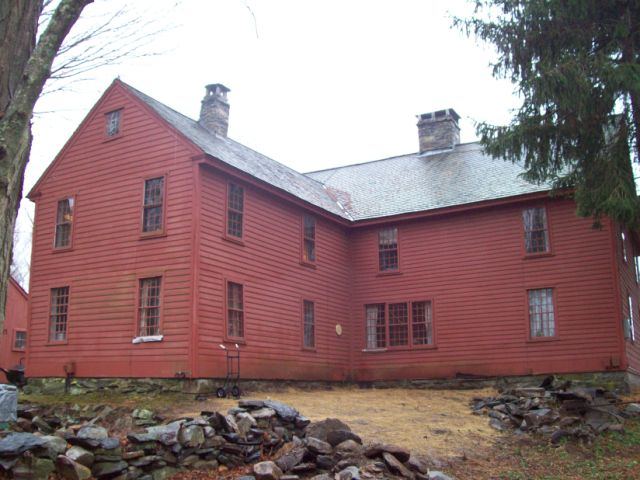

== See also ==
- National Register of Historic Places listings in New London County, Connecticut
