= Brewster Homestead =

Historic house in Connecticut

- U.S. National Register of Historic Places
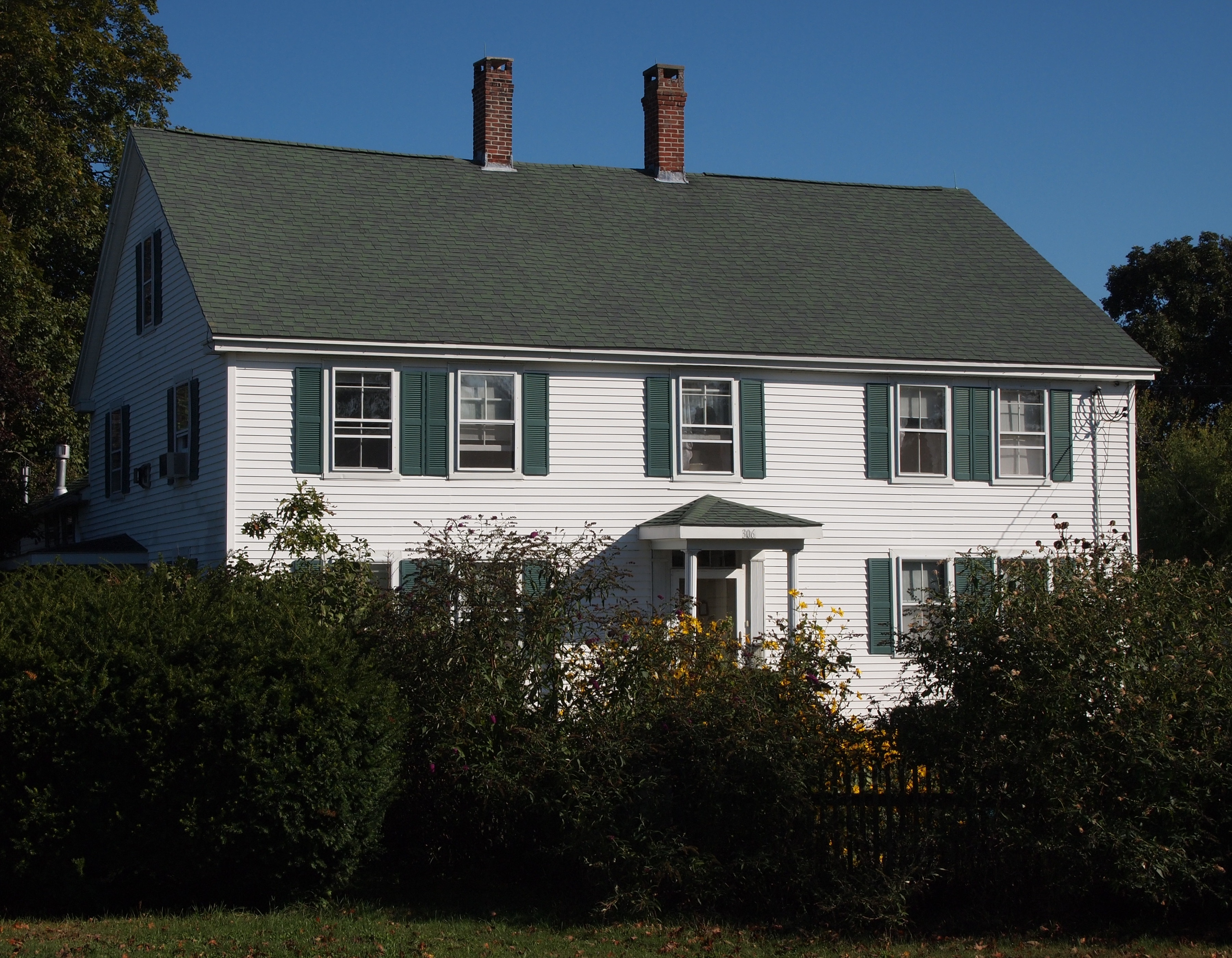

- Location within Connecticut Location within the United States
- Location: 306 Preston Road, Griswold, Connecticut
- Coordinates: 41.5778902°N 71.9769012°W
- Area: 137 acres (55 ha)
- Architectural style: Colonial, Federal
- NRHP reference No.: 00001561
- Added to NRHP: December 28, 2000

The Brewster Homestead is a historic house at 306 Preston Road (Connecticut Route 164) in Griswold, Connecticut, built about 1740 and one of the oldest buildings in the town. The house was owned by six generations of the Brewster family, and originally was the centerpiece of a farmstead of 250 acres (100 ha). The house was listed on the National Register of Historic Places in 2000 by Ron and Kate Bauer.

== Description and history ==
The Brewster Homestead is located in western Griswold at the northeast corner of Preston and Brewster Roads. It is a 2 1/2-story wood-frame structure, five bays wide, with two small interior chimneys. It is finished in vinyl siding, although its original (c. 1740) clapboards are underneath. A 1 1/2-story ell extends to the rear of the house. The main facade is five bays wide, with the main entrance at the center, sheltered by a late 19th-century hip-roofed porch. The interior retains a number of original features, including plaster walls, gunstock posts in the framing, and paneled fireplace surrounds. The basement includes the foundational remains of a large chimney which was removed in the 19th century, at the same time that the original main staircase was replaced.

The homestead stands on a remnant of a large property which Mohegan sachem Uncas gave to Jonathan Brewster, son of William Brewster, a founding elder of the Plymouth Colony. Simon Brewster, a descendent of Jonathan's brother Love, developed a 250-acre (100 ha) parcel as a farm beginning in 1740, probably building this house near its center. The house remained in the hands of Brewster's descendants until 1996, when Ron and Kate Bauer bought it and ran a bed and breakfast called Homespun Farm for 15 years. A portion of the original estate is now the site of a golf club across Preston Road, and the house is associated with 137 acres (55 ha), much of it open land.

== See also ==
- National Register of Historic Places listings in New London County, Connecticut
