= Jewett City, Connecticut =

- Borough
- Borough of Jewett City
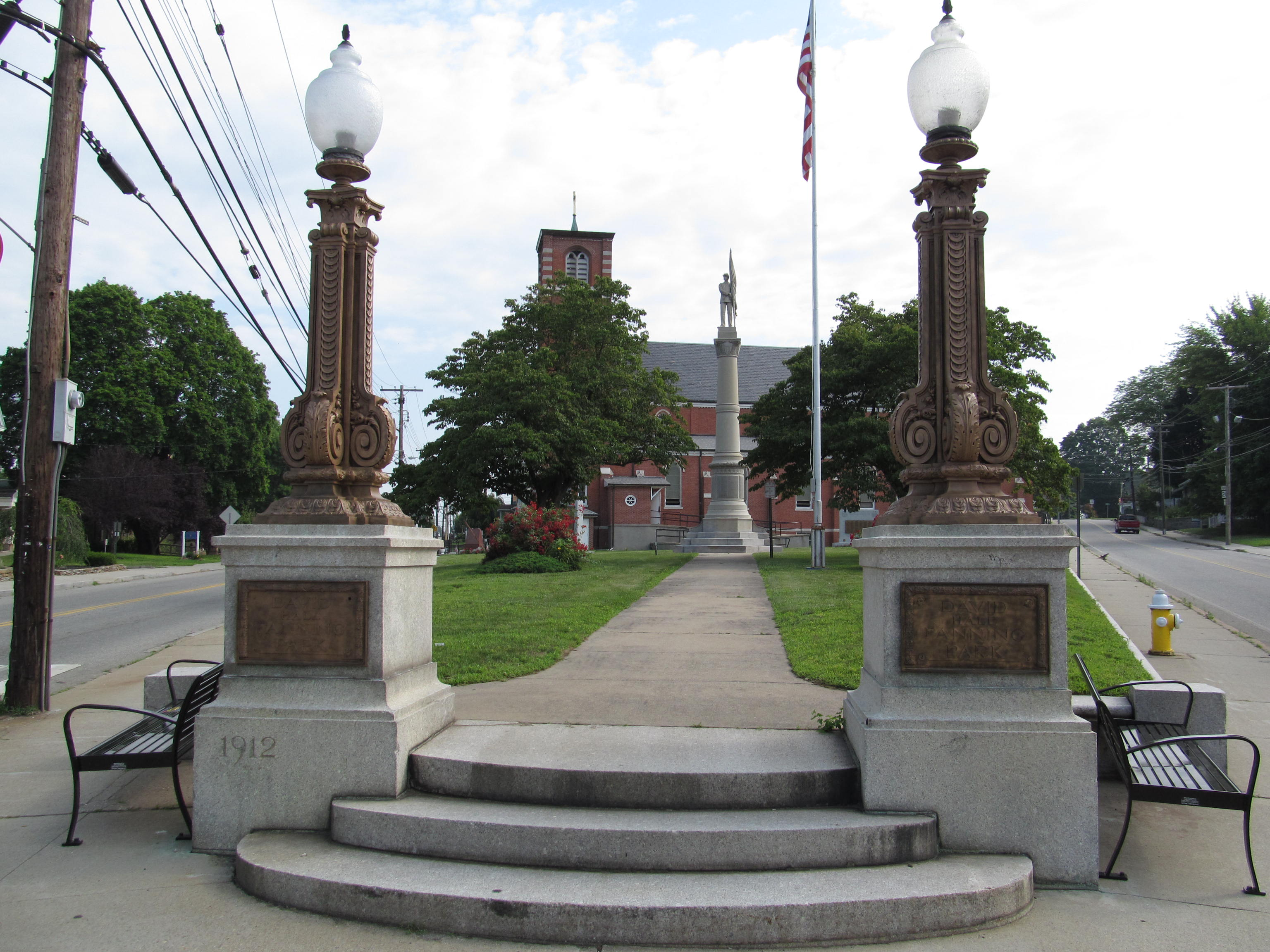
- The center of Jewett City
- Interactive map of Jewett City, Connecticut
- Coordinates: 41°36′26″N 71°58′47″W
- Country: United States
- U.S. state: Connecticut
- County: New London
- Region: Southeastern CT
- Town: Griswold

Government
  - Borough Warden: Timothy Sharkey (D)

Area
  - Total: 0.74 sq mi (1.92 km^{2})
  - Land: 0.71 sq mi (1.83 km^{2})
  - Water: 0.039 sq mi (0.10 km^{2})
- Elevation: 154 ft (47 m)

Population (2020)
  - Total: 3,328
  - Density: 4,768.1/sq mi (1,840.96/km^{2})
- Time zone: UTC-5 (Eastern (EST))
  - Summer (DST): UTC-4 (EDT)
- ZIP Code: 06351
- Area codes: 860/959
- FIPS code: 09-39940
- GNIS feature ID: 0208160
- Website: jewettcity.org

Jewett City is a borough in New London County, Connecticut, United States, in the town of Griswold. The borough is part of the Southeastern Connecticut Planning Region. The population was 3,328 at the 2020 census, down from 3,487 in 2010. The borough was named for Eliezer Jewett, who founded a settlement there in 1771.

== Geography ==
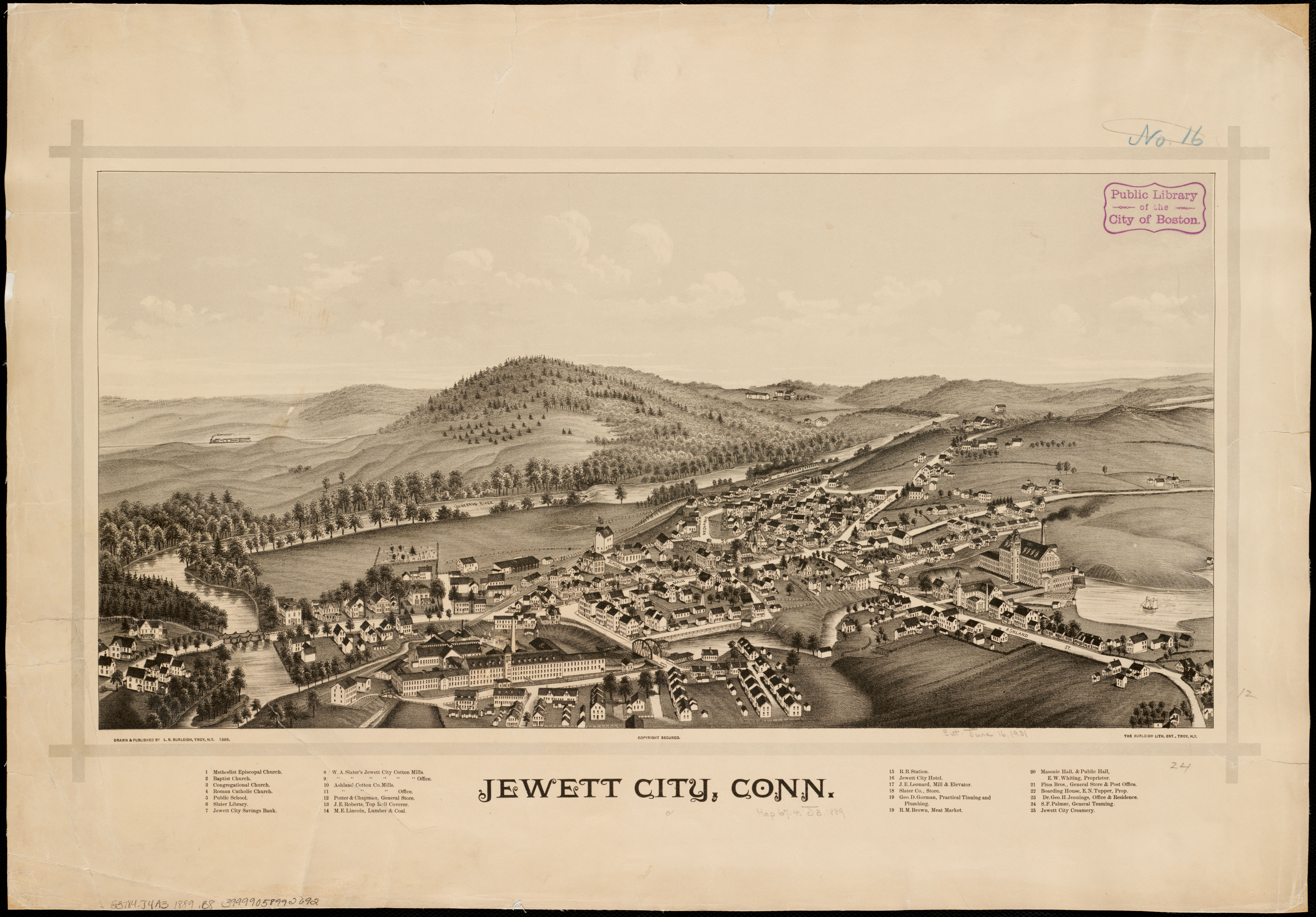
Print of Jewett City from 1889 by L.R.. Burleigh with listing of landmarks

According to the United States Census Bureau, the borough has a total area of 0.8 square miles (2.1 km^{2}), of which 0.7 square miles (1.8 km^{2}) is land and 0.04 square miles (0.10 km^{2}), or 4.00%, is water.

== Demographics ==
Historical population
| Census | Pop. | Note | %± |
|---|---|---|---|
| 1890 | 1,934 | | — |
| 1900 | 2,224 | | 15.0% |
| 1910 | 3,023 | | 35.9% |
| 1920 | 3,196 | | 5.7% |
| 1930 | 4,436 | | 38.8% |
| 1940 | 3,682 | | −17.0% |
| 1950 | 3,702 | | 0.5% |
| 1960 | 3,608 | | −2.5% |
| 1970 | 3,372 | | −6.5% |
| 1980 | 3,294 | | −2.3% |
| 1990 | 3,349 | | 1.7% |
| 2000 | 3,053 | | −8.8% |
| 2010 | 3,487 | | 14.2% |
| 2020 | 3,328 | | −4.6% |
U.S. Decennial Census

=== 2020 census ===
As of the 2020 census, Jewett City had a population of 3,328. The median age was 37.1 years. 21.8% of residents were under the age of 18 and 12.5% of residents were 65 years of age or older. For every 100 females there were 100.0 males, and for every 100 females age 18 and over there were 94.2 males age 18 and over.

99.8% of residents lived in urban areas, while 0.2% lived in rural areas.

There were 1,452 households in Jewett City, of which 30.0% had children under the age of 18 living in them. Of all households, 29.2% were married-couple households, 23.6% were households with a male householder and no spouse or partner present, and 34.4% were households with a female householder and no spouse or partner present. About 33.6% of all households were made up of individuals and 10.5% had someone living alone who was 65 years of age or older.

There were 1,608 housing units, of which 9.7% were vacant. The homeowner vacancy rate was 2.9% and the rental vacancy rate was 8.7%.

Racial composition as of the 2020 census
| Race | Number | Percent |
|---|---|---|
| White | 2,541 | 76.4% |
| Black or African American | 157 | 4.7% |
| American Indian and Alaska Native | 32 | 1.0% |
| Asian | 138 | 4.1% |
| Native Hawaiian and Other Pacific Islander | 0 | 0.0% |
| Some other race | 131 | 3.9% |
| Two or more races | 329 | 9.9% |
| Hispanic or Latino (of any race) | 291 | 8.7% |

=== 2000 census ===
As of the census of 2000, there were 3,053 people, 1,337 households, and 743 families residing in the borough. The population density was 4,213.9 inhabitants per square mile (1,627.0/km^{2}). There were 1,464 housing units at an average density of 2,020.7 per square mile (780.2/km^{2}). The racial makeup of the borough was 92.07% White, 2.46% African American, 0.88% Native American, 1.44% Asian, 0.07% Pacific Islander, 1.11% from other races, and 1.97% from two or more races. Hispanic or Latino of any race were 2.85% of the population.

There were 1,337 households, out of which 29.2% had children under the age of 18 living with them, 34.8% were married couples living together, 15.7% had a female householder with no husband present, and 44.4% were non-families. 34.2% of all households were made up of individuals, and 11.4% had someone living alone who was 65 years of age or older. The average household size was 2.27 and the average family size was 2.92.

The population in the borough was spread out, with 23.9% under the age of 18, 9.7% from 18 to 24, 34.8% from 25 to 44, 18.7% from 45 to 64, and 12.9% who were 65 years of age or older. The median age was 34 years. For every 100 females, there were 98.1 males. For every 100 females age 18 and over, there were 95.5 males.

The median income for a household in the borough was $42,318, and the median income for a family was $45,826. Males had a median income of $31,919 versus $22,463 for females. The per capita income for the borough was $19,083. 9.2% of the population and 8.8% of families were below the poverty line. 12.7% of those under the age of 18 and 12.2% of those 65 and older were living below the poverty line.

== The Daily Show ==
Jewett City was featured on The Daily Show with Jon Stewart after being at the center of a church bell controversy. The episode, which aired on March 6, 2007, held a segment called "Sam on Your Side" with the main focus on the ringing of the Jewett City bells. (Note: "Sam on Your Side" was a segment in which Sam Bee, one of the Daily Show's news reporters, would "side up" with a select person on an item of debate and argument. Sam sided with Bill Russell, a light bulb salesman and atheist, who was upset that the taxpayer money was used to buy a sound system that, as he put it, is "currently playing Christian music." As the segment continues, the viewer finds out that Bill has a weak argument as he doesn't live in Jewett City, is only exposed to the chimes about once or twice a month, the chimes, which have a small variety of songs to play, barely plays Christian music, and everyone in town loves it. Bill says that he is looking for someone in the town that is upset with the chimes as he is, but Sam goes around talking to the locals (one of them being Phil-Anthony, former co-owner of Anthony's hardware, during which Sam opens and closes his shop door causing it to emit a "chime," which alerts that someone is entering the store, and attempts to see if the chimes are antagonizing towards him. Phil-Anthony responds by telling her that it doesn't bother him and that she can keep opening and closing the door "till your arm falls off.") She finds that no one in the town seems upset by the chimes. Upon receiving no results she confronts Ron Ward, Borough Warden Candidate and JCP founder, telling him that this "is a clear violation of the separation of the Church and state." Ron, who had sent a message to Mr. Russel telling him to "leave us alone," says that the church has nothing to do with picking the songs in the first place. Bee asks if they play Christian music, and he says, "They do play Onward Christian Soldiers. That's probably the only one right now that might be considered religious." Later Sam Bee returns to Mr. Russell and asks if he were in her place, would he take his side? He doesn't respond.)

== Education ==
The borough, along with the rest of Griswold Town, is in Griswold School District.

== See also ==
- Jewett City Vampires

== Gallery ==
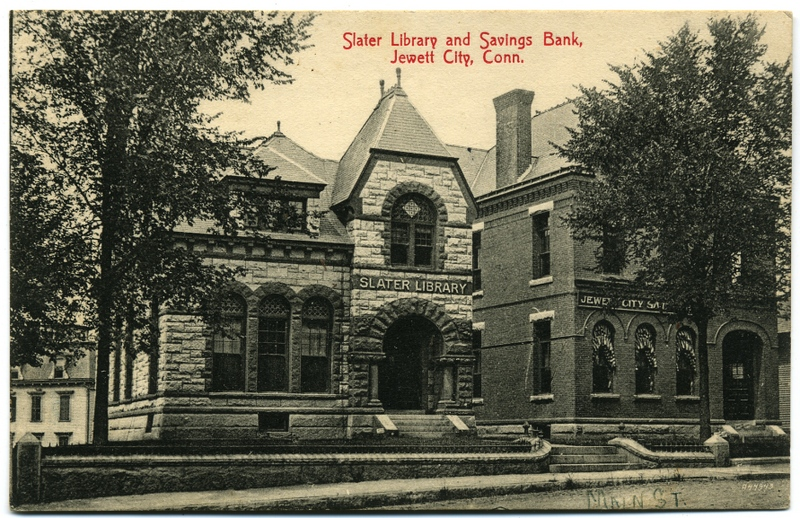
Slater Library and a bank, 1908

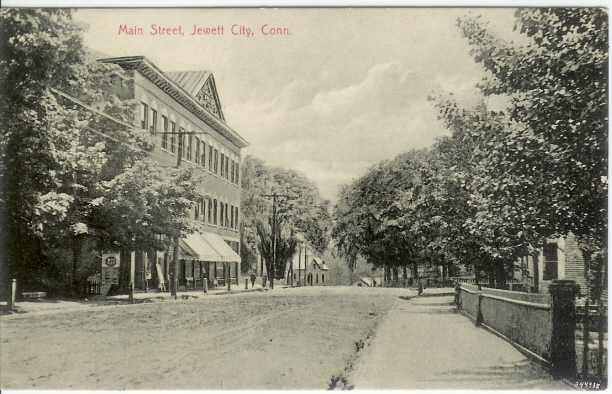
Main Street, 1907

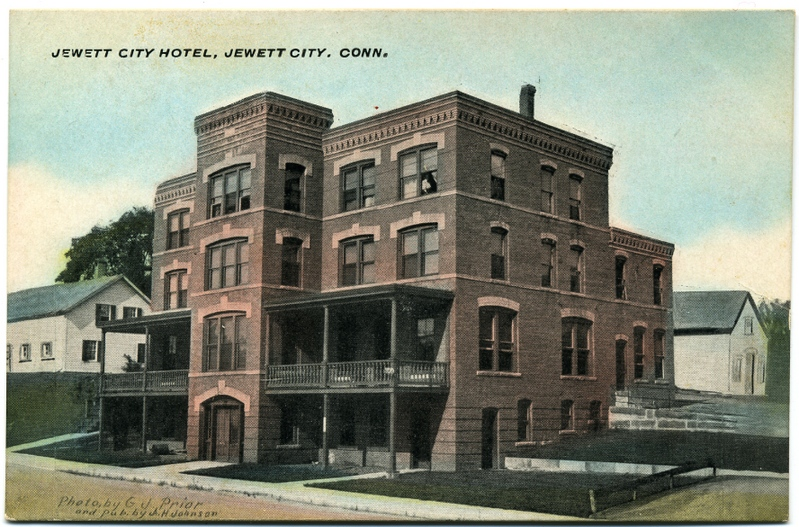
Jewett City Hotel, c. 1909
