= Edward Cogswell House =

Historic house in Connecticut

- U.S. National Register of Historic Places
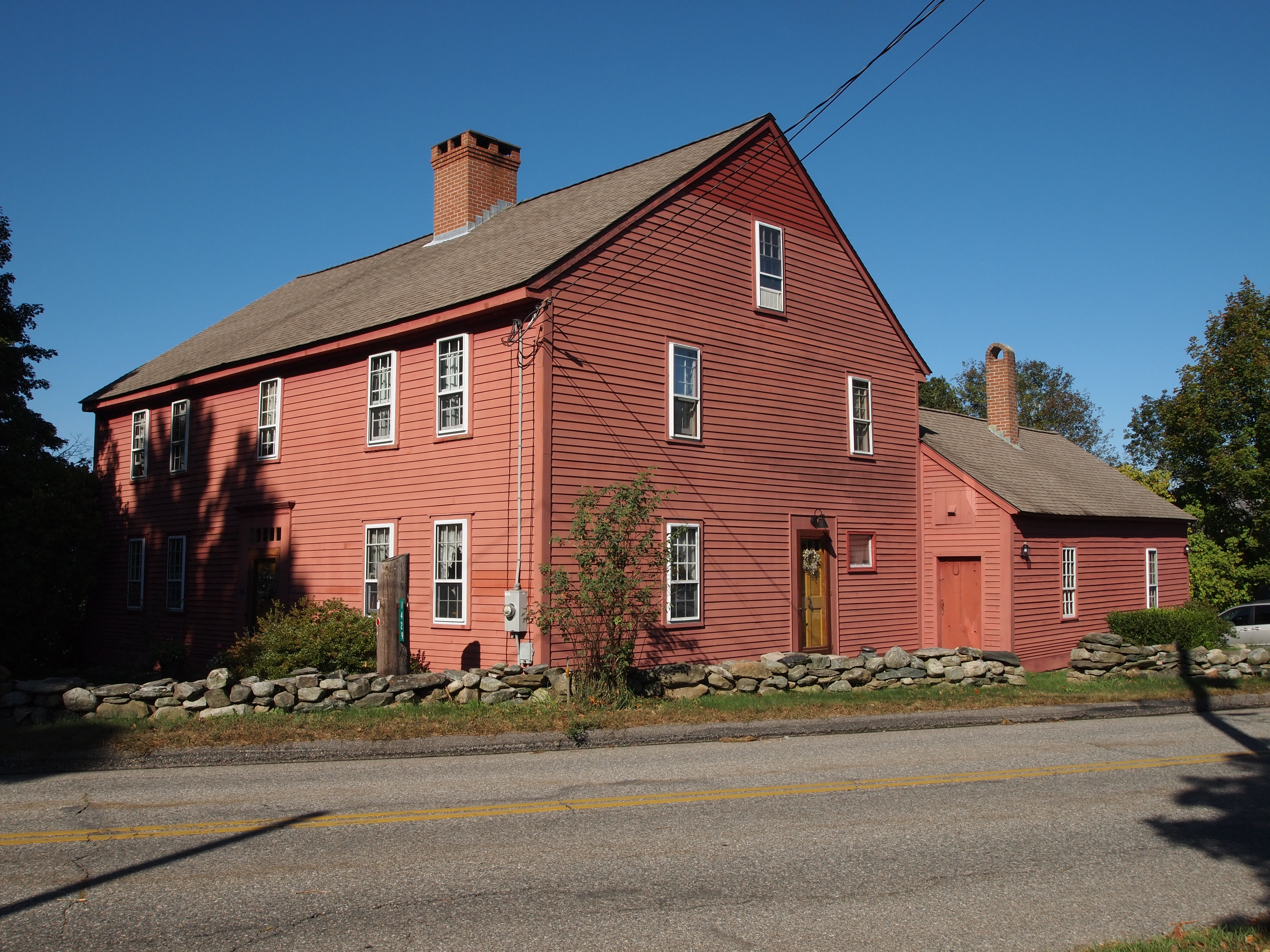

- Location within Connecticut Location within the United States
- Location: 1429 Hopeville Road, Griswold, Connecticut
- Coordinates: 41°35′7″N 71°54′8″W
- Area: 2 acres (0.81 ha)
- Architectural style: Colonial, Post-medieval English
- NRHP reference No.: 93001378
- Added to NRHP: December 15, 1993

The Edward Cogswell House, also known as the Bliss House, is a historic house at 1429 Hopeville Road in Griswold, Connecticut. Its oldest portion dates to around 1740, making it one of Griswold's few 18th-century buildings. It was added to the National Register of Historic Places on December 15, 1993.

== Description and history ==
The Edward Cogswell House is located in a rural area of eastern Griswold, on the west side of Hopeville Road, about 0.5 miles (0.80 km) north of Connecticut Route 138. It is a 2 1/2-story wood-frame structure, five bays wide, with a large central chimney, clapboard siding, and a stone foundation. A 1 1/2-story ell extends to the rear. The ell is probably the oldest portion of the building, a common occurrence for houses of the period. The interior follows a typical central chimney plan, with a small entry vestibule that has a narrow winding stair to the second floor. Parlors flank the chimney on either side, and the kitchen extends across the rear, with small chambers at the rear corners. Interior finishes include original woodwork and wide chestnut floorboards.

The house's ell was built about 1740 by Edward Cogswell, who came to the Griswold area in 1714 as one of its first settlers. Cogswell was prominent in the ultimate separation of Griswold from Preston, and was an investor in an early ironworks. His son John inherited the property and served in the American Revolutionary War. The house and associated farmlands remained in the hands of Cogswell descendants until 1862.

== See also ==
- National Register of Historic Places listings in New London County, Connecticut
