= Eliezer Jewett =

Eliezer (also spelled Elizier, Eleazor, Eleazer or Elizer) Jewett (August 31, 1731 in Norwich, Connecticut – December 7, 1817) was the namesake of Jewett City, Connecticut, now the borough of the town of Griswold, Connecticut. He founded a settlement there in 1771.

Jewett was the great grandson of Jeremiah Jewett, who emigrated from Bradford, England as a child with his parents in 1638 and settled in Rowley, Massachusetts. Author Frances Manwaring Caulkins described him as "not a man of finished education, or of any peculiar mental power, but active, persevering, and of a genial, kindly temperament, happy in doing good and opening paths of enterprise for the benefit of others, without laboring to enrich himself."

Jewett built a saw mill, grist mill and fulling mill, a tavern and an irrigation plant in the area later known as Jewett City. The mills utilized the water power of the Pachaug River. About 1790 Jewett was joined in the area by John Wilson, an English clothier from Massachusetts, who married Jewett's daughter, purchased the fulling mill and established a clothier's shop. Jewett City was officially named in 1895.

Jewett's monument in the Jewett City graveyard reads:

In memory of Mr. Eliezer Jewett, who died Dec 7th 1817, in the 87th year of his age. In April, 1771, he began the settlement of this village, and from his persevering industry and active benevolence, it has derived its present importance: its name will perpetuate his memory.

== Descendants ==
Jewett had seven children. He married first to Sarah Farnham (1734 - 1798) and he married secondly to Elizabeth Jewett (1748 - 1822). His children by Sarah Farnham Jewett include:

- Lydia Jewett Wilson (1756 - 1794)
- Olive Jewitt Bill (1757 - 1836)
- Elisabeth Jewett Boardman (1759 - 1843)
- Joseph Jewett (1762 - 1831)
- Sarah Jewett Murdock (1763 - 1790)

His son Joseph Jewett became a prominent judge. His grandson Dr. Charles Jewett was a prominent figure in the Temperance Reform movement.
