= Jewett City vampires =

1854 tuberculosis-related folk ritual

The Jewett City vampires were thought to be the cause of an incident surrounding the Ray family, a large farming family of Griswold, Connecticut, in the 1840s and 1850s, who upon the death of multiple family members concluded they were plagued by vampires, and in 1854 disinterred the dead relatives and burned their bodies to "protect" themselves from the undead.

== History ==
Some time in the mid 19th century one member of the Ray family had contracted tuberculosis, and the first fatality came with the death of 24-year-old Lemuel Ray in 1845. Shortly after Lemuel Ray's father Henry B. Ray died in 1851. Two years later 26-year-old Elisha Ray, Lemuel's brother, died in 1853. One year after that in 1854 Henry Ray, Henry B. Ray's eldest son and Lemuel and Elisha's brother, died from the disease. Another common method to ensure that dead family members remained that way was to cut out the heart of the deceased member and burn it to cure the rest of the family and put the spirit to rest.

The Ray family died of tuberculosis (then known as consumption) over a period of nine years.

== Modern rediscovery ==
A few miles away from where the Ray family is buried, in the early 1990s a few children were playing near a hillside gravel mine in Griswold, Connecticut. There, they discovered the unmarked Walton Family graveyard. 29 graves were uncovered collectively belonging to both the Walton family and the Barber Family. One such grave had a body which was buried, exhumed, then reburied with its skull dislocated from its spine placed face down with its femurs placed in an "X" below the skull.
