= Southeastern Connecticut Planning Region, Connecticut =

Southeastern Connecticut Council of Governments (SCCOG)
- Planning region
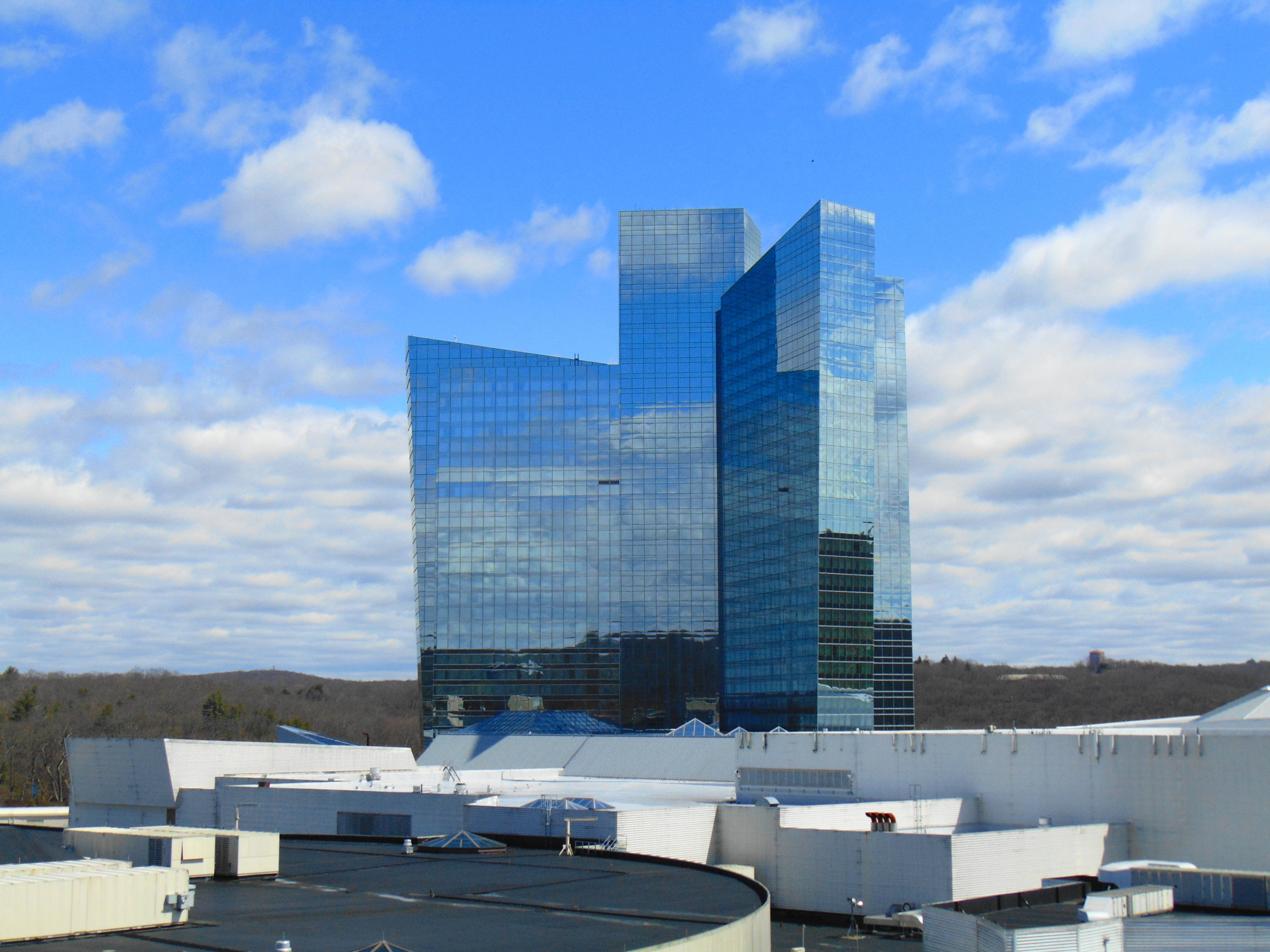
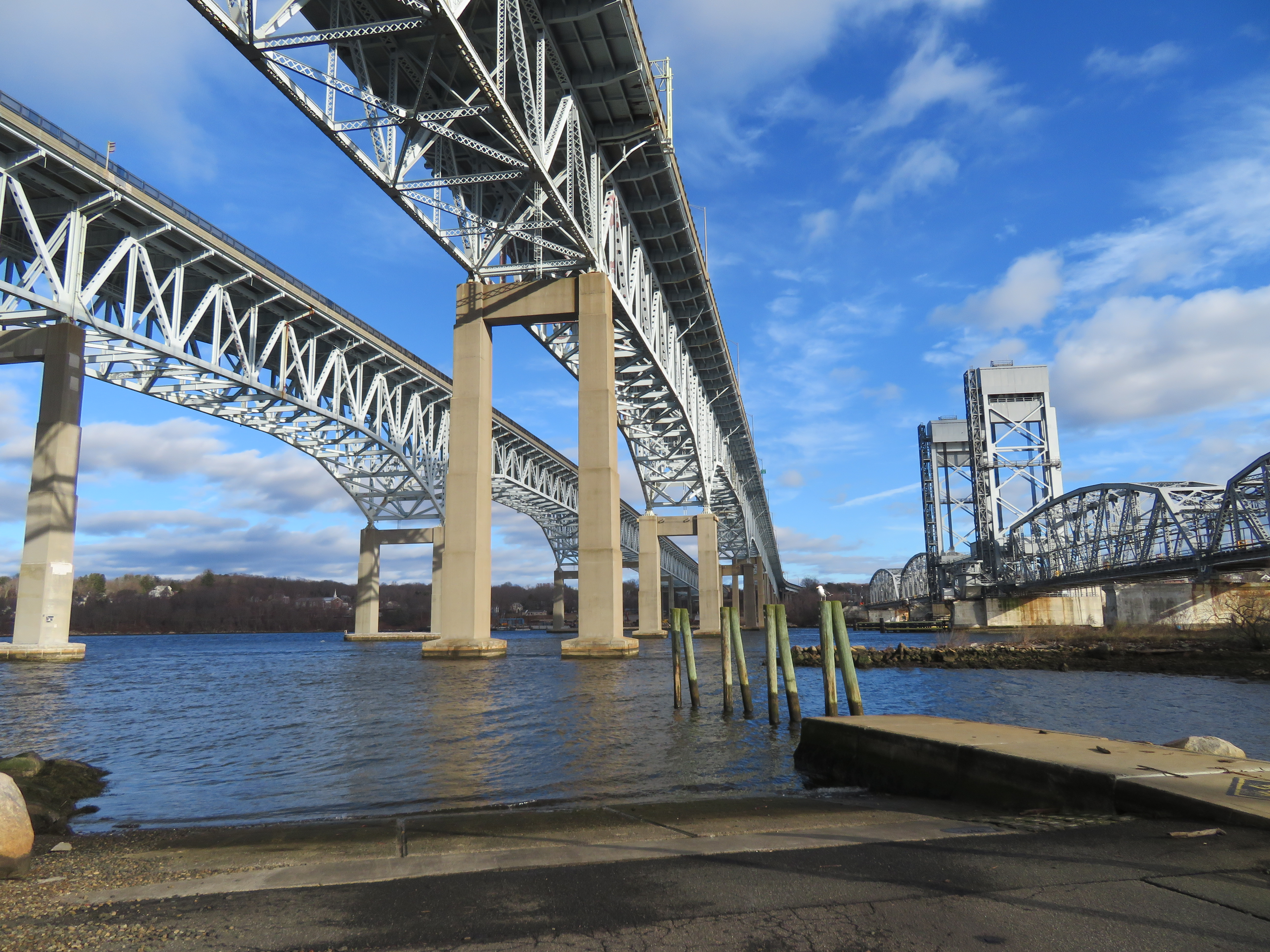
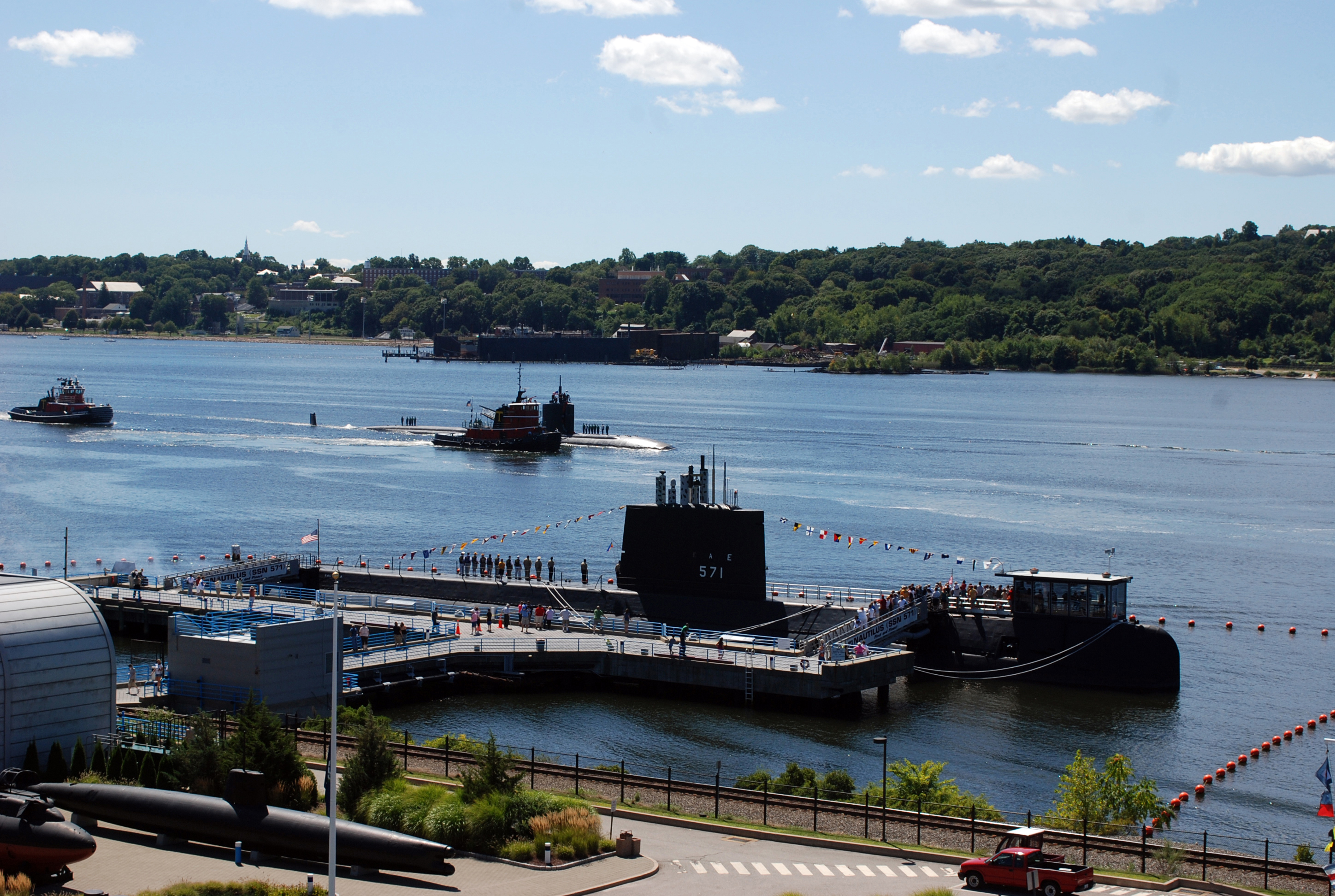
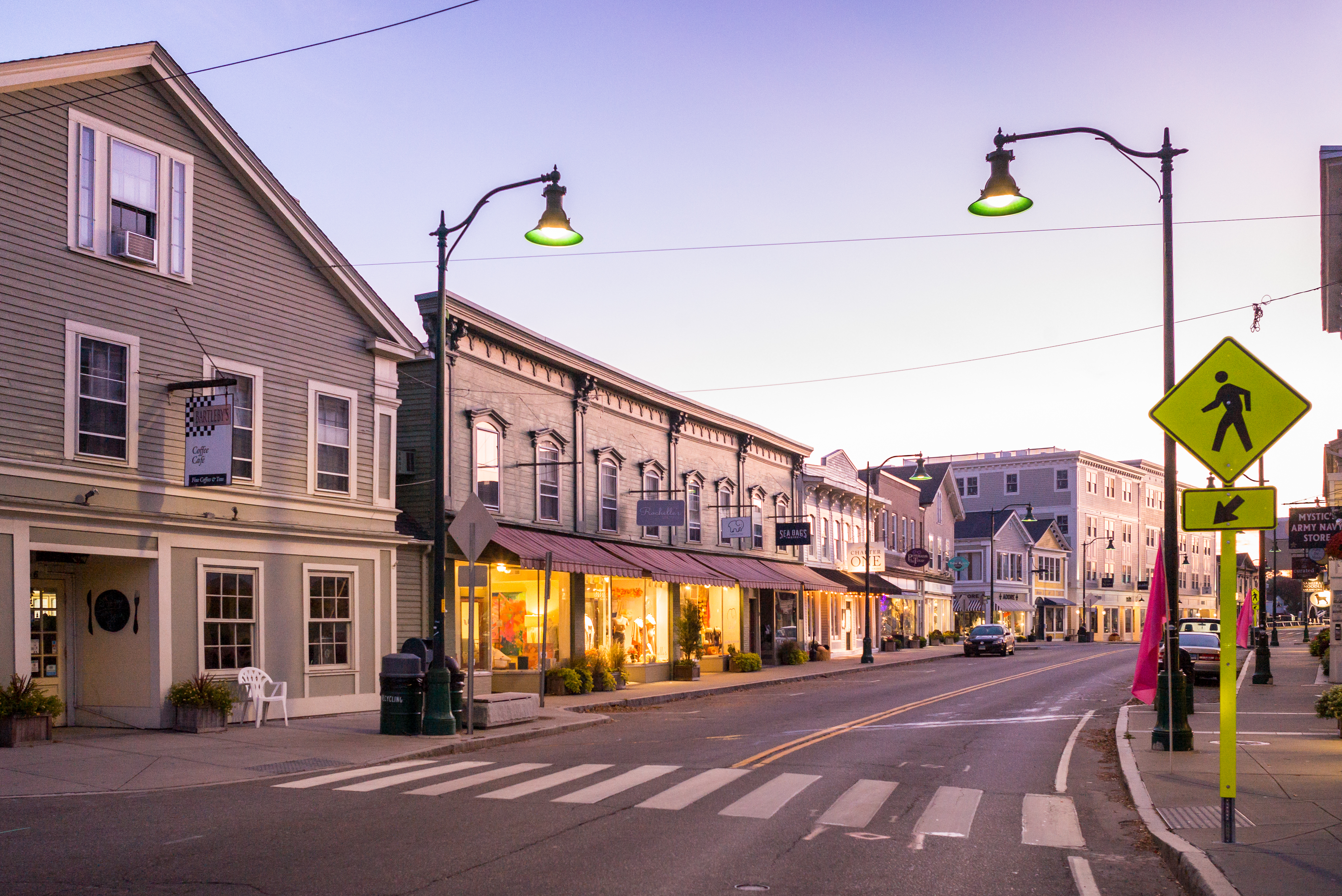
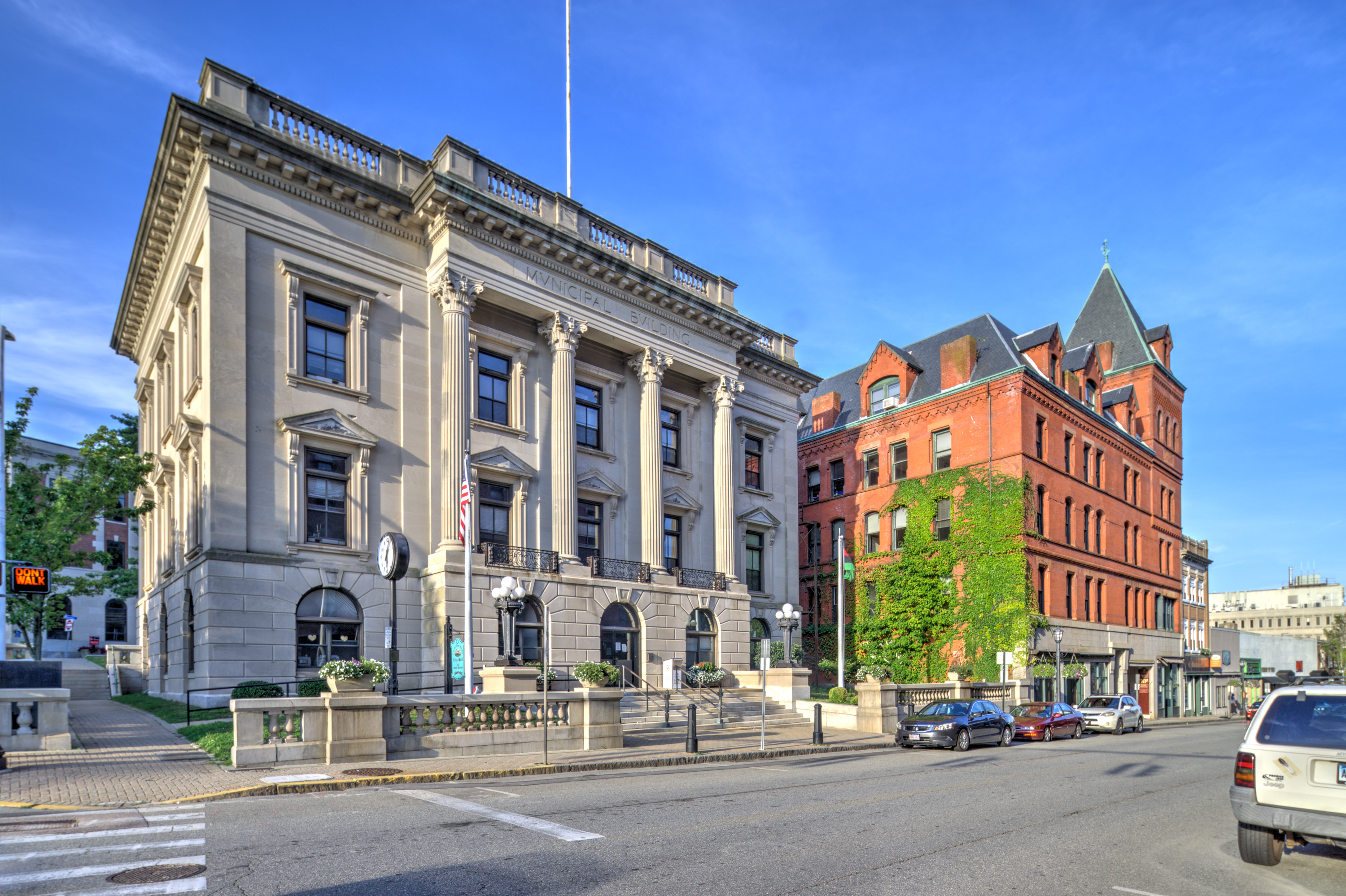
- From top left: Mohegan Sun, Gold Star Memorial Bridge, Submarine Force Library and Museum, Mystic Village, Downtown Historic District in New London

- Logo

- Location within the U.S. state of Connecticut
- Coordinates: 41°29′N 72°05′W
- Country: United States
- State: Connecticut
- Founded: 1992
- Largest city: Norwich
- Other cities: New London, Willimantic, Groton

Government
  - Executive Director: Amanda E. Kennedy

Area
  - Total: 598.1 sq mi (1,549 km^{2})

Population (2020)
  - Total: 280,430
  - Estimate (2025): 284,015 ▲
  - Density: 468.9/sq mi (181.0/km^{2})
- Time zone: UTC−5 (Eastern)
  - Summer (DST): UTC−4 (EDT)
- Congressional district: 2nd
- Website: seccog.org

Interactive map of the Southeastern Connecticut Planning Region

The Southeastern Connecticut Planning Region is a planning region and county-equivalent in the U.S. state of Connecticut. It is served by the coterminous Southeastern Connecticut Council of Governments (SCCOG). In 2022, planning regions were approved to replace Connecticut's counties as county-equivalents for statistical purposes, with full implementation occurring by 2024.

== Demographics ==
Historical population
Census	Pop.	Note	%±
1790	1,192		—
1800	17,301		1,351.4%
1810	14,484		−16.3%
1820	31,825		119.7%
1830	35,549		11.7%
1840	38,247		7.6%
1850	49,942		30.6%
1860	63,424		27.0%
1870	69,439		9.5%
1880	72,973		5.1%
1890	78,352		7.4%
1900	83,731		6.9%
1910	96,412		15.1%
1920	111,951		16.1%
1930	125,200		11.8%
1940	129,100		3.1%
1950	146,380		13.4%
1960	201,047		37.3%
1970	245,752		22.2%
1980	253,147		3.0%
1990	269,748		6.6%
2000	273,048		1.2%
2010	290,198		6.3%
2020	280,430		−3.4%
2025 (est.)	284,015	▲	1.3%
U.S. Decennial Census

As of the 2020 United States census, there were 280,430 people living in the Southeastern Planning Region.

== Municipalities ==
The following municipalities are members of the Southeastern Connecticut Region:

=== Cities ===
- New London
- Norwich

=== Towns ===
- Bozrah
- Colchester
- East Lyme
- Franklin
- Griswold
- Groton
- Lebanon
- Ledyard
- Lisbon
- Montville
- North Stonington
- Preston
- Salem
- Sprague
- Stonington
- Waterford
- Windham

=== Boroughs ===
- Jewett City (Located within the Town of Griswold)
