= Griswold, Connecticut =

- Town
- Town of Griswold
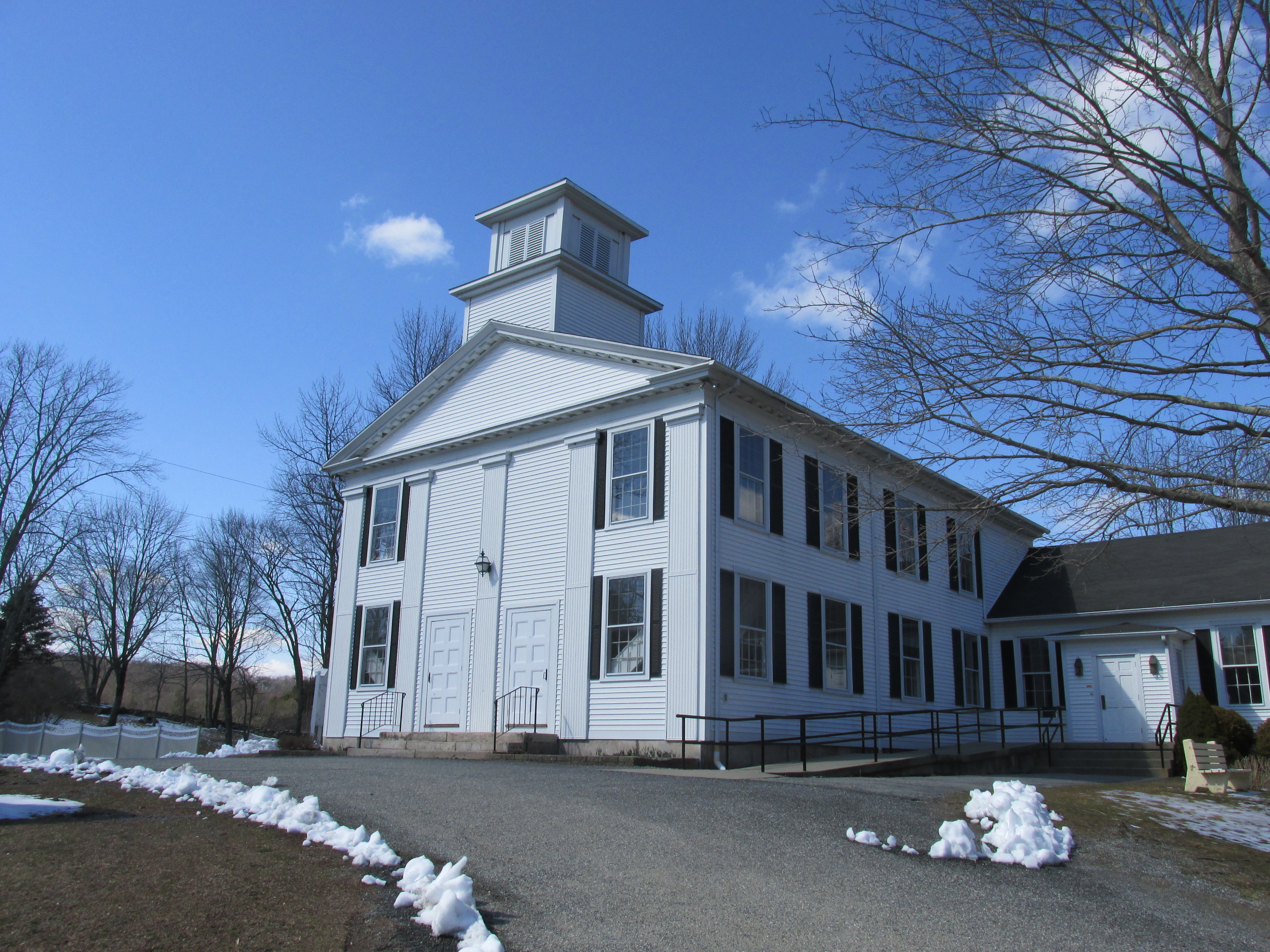
- First Congregational Church

- Seal
- Interactive map of Griswold, Connecticut
- Coordinates: 41°35′04″N 71°55′16″W
- Country: United States
- U.S. state: Connecticut
- County: New London
- Region: Southeastern CT
- Incorporated: 1815

Government
  - Type: Selectman-town meeting
  - First selectman: Tina Falck

Area
  - Total: 37.1 sq mi (96.0 km^{2})
  - Land: 34.7 sq mi (89.9 km^{2})
  - Water: 2.4 sq mi (6.1 km^{2})
- Elevation: 210 ft (64 m)

Population (2020)
  - Total: 11,402
  - Density: 328/sq mi (127/km^{2})
- Time zone: UTC-5 (Eastern)
  - Summer (DST): UTC-4 (Eastern)
- ZIP Code: 06351
- Area codes: 860/959
- FIPS code: 09-33900
- GNIS feature ID: 0213436
- Website: www.griswold-ct.org

Griswold is a town in New London County, Connecticut, United States. The town is part of the Southeastern Connecticut Planning Region. The population was 11,402 at the 2020 census. Griswold contains the borough of Jewett City and the villages of Doaneville, Kaalmanville, Rixtown, Glasgo, Hopeville, Nathanieltown, and Pachaug.

== History ==
Long a fishing ground for the Mohegan people, the waterways attracted settlers who established ironworks, saw and corn mills, and other businesses.

The town of Griswold was originally the northern part of the town of Preston. The North Society was established in 1716 at the request of residents who had been travelling to Preston to attend church.

In the late 1700s, Eliezer Jewett opened several mills and an irrigation plant. His success led the area to be called Jewett City. The town of Griswold incorporated in 1815, naming itself after Governor Roger Griswold. In 1895, Jewett City incorporated as a borough of the town.

In 1820, a notable trial took place of Ammi Rogers, a popular preacher who had been accused of forcing a Griswold woman, Asenath Smith, to have an abortion to hide their sexual relationship. This led to Connecticut developing the United States' first abortion law.

Griswold contains Hopeville Pond State Park, former site of a woolen mill.

== Geography ==
The Pachaug and Quinebaug rivers flow through the town of Griswold, which is located at the northeastern edge of New London County. According to the United States Census Bureau, the town has a total area of 37.1 square miles (96.0 km^{2}), of which 34.7 square miles (89.9 km^{2}) is land and 2.4 square miles (6.1 km^{2}), or 6.37%, is water.

== Demographics ==
Historical population
| Census | Pop. | Note | %± |
|---|---|---|---|
| 1820 | 1,859 | | — |
| 1850 | 2,065 | | — |
| 1860 | 2,217 | | 7.4% |
| 1870 | 2,575 | | 16.1% |
| 1880 | 2,745 | | 6.6% |
| 1890 | 3,113 | | 13.4% |
| 1900 | 3,490 | | 12.1% |
| 1910 | 4,233 | | 21.3% |
| 1920 | 4,220 | | −0.3% |
| 1930 | 6,010 | | 42.4% |
| 1940 | 5,343 | | −11.1% |
| 1950 | 5,728 | | 7.2% |
| 1960 | 6,472 | | 13.0% |
| 1970 | 7,763 | | 19.9% |
| 1980 | 8,967 | | 15.5% |
| 1990 | 10,384 | | 15.8% |
| 2000 | 10,807 | | 4.1% |
| 2010 | 11,951 | | 10.6% |
| 2020 | 11,402 | | −4.6% |

As of the census of 2010, there were 11,951 people, 4,646 households, and 3,225 families living in the town. The population density was 344.4 inhabitants per square mile (133.0/km^{2}). There were 5,118 housing units at an average density of 147.5 per square mile (57.0/km^{2}). The racial makeup of the town was 91.6% White, 1.8% African American, 0.9% Native American, 2.2% Asian, 0.03% Pacific Islander, 0.6% some other race, and 2.8% from two or more races. Hispanic or Latino people of any race were 3.3% of the population.

There were 4,646 households, out of which 31.3% had children under the age of 18 living with them, 50.3% were headed by married couples living together, 12.5% had a female householder with no husband present, and 30.6% were non-families. 23.3% of all households were made up of individuals, and 7.4% were someone living alone who was 65 years of age or older. The average household size was 2.57 and the average family size was 3.00.

In the town, the population was spread out, with 22.9% under the age of 18, 8.4% from 18 to 24, 27.2% from 25 to 44, 30.8% from 45 to 64, and 10.7% who were 65 years of age or older. The median age was 39.6 years. For every 100 females, there were 99.8 males. For every 100 females age 18 and over, there were 97.8 males.

At the 2000 census, the median income for a household in the town was $40,156, and the median income for a family was $48,852. Males had a median income of $57,869 versus $17,441 for females. The per capita income for the town was $21,196. About 6.1% of families and 9.2% of the population were below the poverty line, including 6.1% of those under age 18 and 7.6% of those age 65 or over.

Voter registration and party enrollment as of October 30, 2014
| Party | Active voters | Inactive voters | Total voters | Percentage |
|---|---|---|---|---|
| Democratic | 2,161 | 116 | 2,277 | 33.1% |
| Republican | 1,314 | 33 | 1,347 | 19.6% |
| Unaffiliated | 2,946 | 197 | 3,143 | 45.6% |
| Minor parties | 115 | 5 | 120 | 1.7% |
| Total | 6,536 | 351 | 6,887 | 100% |

== Notable locations ==
- Ashland Mill Bridge, a bridge over the Pachaug River built in 1886 and on the National Register of Historic Places since 1999
- Avery House, built in 1770, added to the National Register of Historic Places in 1986
- Brewster Homestead, built about 1740, it is one of the oldest surviving buildings in Griswold and was listed on the National Register of Historic Places in 2000
- Edward Cogswell House, added to the National Register of Historic Places in 1993
- John Wilson House, built about 1781, it is an example of Georgian residential architecture, and as the home of John Wilson, a leading local industrialist of the late 18th century. The house was listed on the National Register of Historic Places in 1985.
- Kinne Cemetery, on Jarvis Road, in use since 1713 and added to the National Register of Historic Places in 2001
- Timothy Lester Farmstead, built in 1741 and added to the National Register of Historic Places in 1998
- Slater Library and Fanning Annex, 26 Main Street in Jewett City, built in 1884 and added to the National Register of Historic Places in 2002

== Notable people ==
- Louis J. Bakanowsky, Jr. (1930–2025), architect; founding partner of CambridgeSeven, designers of the New England Aquarium and the Boston Children’s Museum; raised in Jewett City
- Edward S. Banas, Sr. (1946-2026), U.S. Army veteran and National Commander-in-Chief of the Veterans of Foreign Wars; although not a Griswold resident, served as Jewett City VFW Post 10004 Commander and only the second Connecticut veteran to lead the organization.
- Clifford Chapin (born 1988), voice actor affiliated with Funimation; born in Griswold
- Samuel Coit (1708–1792), Militia officer, farmer, politician; Colonel, 8th Connecticut Militia Regiment and Preston representative to the Connecticut General Assembly; resident of North Preston, now Griswold
- John Cantius Garand (1888–1974), Canadian-American designer of firearms best known for creating the first successful semi-automatic rifle to be widely used in active military service, the M1 Garand; namesake of the Interstate 395 bridge that crosses the Quinebaug River on the Griswold/Lisbon town line
- Eliezer Jewett (1731–1817), Founder and namesake of Griswold's borough of Jewett City; settled in 1771
- Roger LaFrancois (born 1956), is an American former professional baseball player. He played for the Boston Red Sox as a catcher in 1982; raised in Jewett City
- Charles H. Tracy (1833–1911), was an infantry soldier who received the Medal of Honor while serving in the Union Army during the American Civil War for two acts of bravery; born in Jewett City
- John Tyler (1721–1804), Brigadier General who fought in both the Seven Years' War and the Revolutionary War; commanding officer of the 10th Continental Regiment of the Connecticut Line and the 3rd Connecticut Brigade of Militia; resident of North Preston, now Griswold
- Moses Coit Tyler (1835–1900), author; born in Griswold
