= Connecticut Route 16 =

State highway in Connecticut, US

Route 16

Route information
- Maintained by CTDOT
- Length: 17.05 mi (27.44 km)
- Existed: 1934–present

Major junctions
- West end: Route 66 in East Hampton
- Route 2 in Colchester
- East end: Route 207 in Lebanon

Location
- Country: United States
- State: Connecticut
- Counties: Middlesex, New London

Highway system
- Connecticut State Highway System; Interstate; US; State; SSR; SR; Scenic
← Route 15	→ Route 17

Route 16 is a primary state route connecting Middletown and Colchester via Route 66. It begins in East Hampton at Route 66 then has an interchange with Route 2 in Colchester. It then runs through Colchester center, then goes to the outskirts of Lebanon town as a rural collector road. Route 16 ends at Route 207 in Lebanon.

== Route description ==
Route 16 begins at a junction with Route 66 in the Cobalt section of East Hampton. It proceeds easterly through the town, intersecting Route 196 before entering the town of Colchester. In the village of Westchester, it intersects Route 149. It then meets Route 2 at Exit 18 before reaching Colchester center. Here it duplexes with Connecticut Route 85 for 0.07 miles, then continues northeasterly toward Lebanon, where it end at a junction with Route 207.

The portion between Route 66 and Route 85 is known as the "Henry Champion Highway".

== History ==
- 1933-34: Commissioned between Route 66 (then known as Route 14) in East Hampton and Route 85 in Colchester
- 1963: Extended to Lebanon

== Junction list ==
County	Location	mi	km	Destinations	Notes
Middlesex	East Hampton	0.00	0.00	Route 66 – Portland, Marlborough	Western terminus
Middlesex	East Hampton	1.69	2.72	Route 196 – East Hampton, East Haddam	
New London	Colchester	7.30	11.75	Route 149 – Hebron, Moodus	
New London	Colchester	11.58	18.64	Route 2 – Norwich, Hartford	Exit 18 on Route 2
New London	Colchester	12.02– 12.09	19.34– 19.46	Route 85 / Norwich Avenue (SR 616 east) – Hebron, Salem	
New London	Lebanon	17.05	27.44	Route 207 – Hebron, North Franklin	Eastern terminus
1.000 mi = 1.609 km; 1.000 km = 0.621 mi
