= Connecticut Route 196 =

State highway in Middlesex County, Connecticut, US

Route 196
- Map of Middlesex County in southern Connecticut with Route 196 highlighted in red

Route information
- Maintained by CTDOT
- Length: 5.38 mi (8.66 km)
- Existed: 1932–present

Major junctions
- South end: Route 151 in Haddam
- North end: Route 66 in East Hampton

Location
- Country: United States
- State: Connecticut
- Counties: Middlesex

Highway system
- Connecticut State Highway System; Interstate; US; State; SSR; SR; Scenic
← Route 195	→ Route 197

Route 196 is a Connecticut state highway in the lower Connecticut River valley, running from Haddam (near the village of Haddam Neck) to the town center of East Hampton.

== Route description ==
Route 196 begins as Young Street at an intersection with Route 151 in the northeastern corner of Haddam, near the village of Haddam Neck. It heads north and crosses into the town of East Hampton after 0.1-mile (0.16 km). The road continues through Wopowog State Wildlife Management Area in rural East Hampton for another 2.8 miles (4.5 km), also serving several farms along the way. The road name later changes to Skinner Street, which continues generally north, crossing the Pocotopaug Creek to an intersection with Route 16. Route 196 then enters the town center of East Hampton, where it uses Main Street, Summit Street, and Lake View Street. It continues north through the town center for another mile until it ends at an intersection with Route 66 at the mouth of Pocotopaug Lake. Route 196 carries traffic volumes of about 2,800 vehicles per day.

== History ==
Route 196 was established as a new route in the 1932 state highway renumbering and has had no changes since then.

== Junction list ==
The entire route is in Middlesex County.

Location	mi	km	Destinations	Notes
Haddam	0.00	0.00	Route 151 – Cobalt, Moodus	Southern terminus
East Hampton	3.73	6.00	Route 16 – Portland, Colchester	
East Hampton	5.38	8.66	Route 66 – Middletown, Marlborough	Northern terminus
1.000 mi = 1.609 km; 1.000 km = 0.621 mi
