= Connecticut Route 207 =

State highway in eastern Connecticut, US

Route 207
- Map of eastern Connecticut with Route 207 highlighted in red

Route information
- Maintained by CTDOT
- Length: 16.01 mi (25.77 km)
- Existed: 1932–present

Major junctions
- West end: Route 85 in Hebron
- East end: Route 97 in Sprague

Location
- Country: United States
- State: Connecticut
- Counties: Tolland, New London

Highway system
- Connecticut State Highway System; Interstate; US; State; SSR; SR; Scenic
← Route 205	→ Route 209

Connecticut Route 207 is a state highway running from Hebron to Sprague.

== Route description ==
Route 207 begins at an intersection with Route 85 in southeastern Hebron and heads east into Lebanon. In Lebanon, it heads southeast between Williams and Brewster Ponds before turning east through the town center and into Franklin. In Franklin, it continues east past Gages Pond before turning southeast in eastern Franklin and crossing into Sprague. In Sprague, it continues east to end at an intersection with Route 97 on the west bank of the Shetucket River in Baltic.

The section of Route 207 in Franklin is designated the Paul Henry Bienvenue Memorial Highway.

== History ==
In 1922, the road from Taftville via Baltic and North Franklin to Lebanon center, was designated as a secondary state highway known as Highway 354. The portion of old Highway 354 between Lebanon center and Baltic was renumbered to Route 207 in the 1932 state highway renumbering. At the same time, the section from Baltic to Taftville was assigned as part of Route 97. In 1935, Route 207 was extended west to the village of Exeter (at Route 16), and further westward to Hebron center (at Route 85) in 1940. At around the same time, the eastern end was reconfigured such that it paralleled but did not intersect Route 97 to the Sprague-Norwich town line. The eastern terminus was moved to its current location in 1962. In 1961, a section in Franklin was reconstructed and realigned to improve the grade.

== Junction list ==
County	Location	mi	km	Destinations	Notes
Tolland	Hebron	0.00	0.00	Route 85 – Amston, Colchester, Hebron	Western terminus
New London	Lebanon	4.50	7.24	Route 16 west – Colchester	Eastern terminus of Route 16
New London	Lebanon	7.88	12.68	Route 87 – Columbia, Yantic	
New London	Franklin	11.08	17.83	Route 32 – South Windham, Franklin	
New London	Franklin	14.33	23.06	Plain Hill Road (SR 610 south)	
New London	Sprague	16.01	25.77	Route 97 to Route 138 – Hanover, Scotland, Occum, Norwich	Eastern terminus
1.000 mi = 1.609 km; 1.000 km = 0.621 mi
