= Connecticut Route 66 =

State highway in Connecticut, US

Route 66
- Map of central Connecticut with Route 66 highlighted in red

Route information
- Maintained by CTDOT
- Length: 38.38 mi (61.77 km)
- Existed: 1968–present

Major junctions
- West end: I-91 / I-691 in Meriden
- Route 17 from Middletown to Portland; Route 2 in Marlborough; US 6 in Columbia
- East end: US 6 in Windham

Location
- Country: United States
- State: Connecticut
- Counties: New Haven, Middlesex, Hartford, Tolland, Windham

Highway system
- Connecticut State Highway System; Interstate; US; State; SSR; SR; Scenic
← Route 64	→ Route 67

Route 66 is an east-west state highway running from Meriden to Windham, serving as an alternate east–west route to U.S. Route 6 (US 6) through east-central Connecticut.

== Route description ==
Route 66 officially begins at I-91 in Meriden as the extension of I-691, which officially ends at its interchange with I-91. It runs as a four-lane freeway for about 1.5 miles (2.4 km) into the town of Middlefield, where it becomes a four-lane surface road. In Middlefield, it has junctions with the northern end of Route 147, and the southern end of Route 217. It then enters Middletown and becomes Washington Street, where it has junctions with the northern end of Route 157 and the southern end of Route 3 before passing by Wesleyan University and entering the downtown area. Route 66 then turns onto Main Street, as Washington Street becomes SR 545, providing southbound access to the Route 9 expressway. At the north end of Main Street, it intersects Route 17. Southbound Route 17 provides access to both directions of Route 9, while northbound Route 17 joins Route 66 to cross the Connecticut River on the Arrigoni Bridge into Portland. Immediately east of the bridge, it meets the southern end of Route 17A, which leads to Portland center. After Route 17 leaves to the north, Route 66 narrows to two lanes and follows the east shore of the Connecticut River into East Hampton. It passes the northern end of Route 151, and bends northeast as it intersects the western end of Route 16. In the center of town, it meets the northern end of Route 196, then crosses into Marlborough. Here, it has a junction with the Route 2 freeway at Exit 15 (old Exit 13). It then passes into Hebron, Connecticut, where it has junctions with Routes 85 and 316 in the center of town. It then enters Columbia, intersecting Route 87 before reaching a junction with US 6 at the western end of the Willimantic bypass. Route 66 turns east as a collector of local traffic headed for Willimantic. In Willimantic, it has a 0.74 mile concurrency with Route 32, and intersects the southern end of Route 195, and the western end of Route 14. It then turns north-northeastward and continues to US 6 at the east end of the Willimantic bypass, where Route 66 ends and US 6 assumes the roadway.

From US 6 in Columbia to the end in Windham, Route 66 is designated the Grand Army of the Republic Highway. The easternmost 1.5 miles (2.4 km) of the route is named Boston Post Road and was part of the former mail route.

== History ==
The entire length of modern Route 66 was originally improved in the 19th century as various private turnpikes. The road from Meriden to Middletown was the Middletown and Meriden Turnpike chartered in 1809 and used the former surface alignment of Route 66 in Meriden (East Main Street). Between Middletown and East Hampton, modern Route 66 was the western half of the Colchester and Chatham Turnpike (the eastern half is modern Route 16), which was chartered in 1808. From East Hampton via Marlborough to the Hebron-Columbia line, the road was the Hebron and Middle Haddam Turnpike that was chartered in 1802. From the Hebron-Columbia line through Columbia to Willimantic, the road was the Columbia Turnpike, chartered in 1808.

Route 66 was originally part of State Highway 111 designated in 1922. It ran from the Milldale section of Southington, via Meriden and Middletown, to Willimantic. In the 1932 state highway renumbering, old Highway 111 was designated as part of Route 14, which extended from Woodbury to the Rhode Island state line. In 1941, the section of Route 14 from Woodbury to Willimantic was redesignated as US 6A, connecting at US 6 on both ends.

In the early 1960s, plans for constructing a US 6A expressway between I-84 in Southington and Willimantic were announced. By 1966, a short portion of the expressway from US 5 in Meriden to Middlefield (where the current expressway ends) opened to traffic. By 1968, the US 6A designation was removed and split into several routes. The section from I-84 in Southington to US 6 in Columbia was renumbered as Route 66, including the newly opened freeway segment. In 1971, another section of the Route 66 freeway opened from between Route 322 and US 5. In 1987, with the completion of the freeway connection to I-84, the section of Route 66 west of I-91 was redesignated as I-691, truncating the western end of Route 66. In 1983, US 6 was rerouted to a newly constructed bypass around Willimantic, and the former surface route section of US 6 from Columbia to Windham was transferred to Route 66.

== Junction list ==
Exit numbers were converted from sequential to mile-based in April 2023.

County	Location	mi	km	Old exit	New exit	Destinations	Notes
New Haven	Meriden	0.00	0.00	—	—	I-691 west to Route 15 north (Wilbur Cross Parkway) – Meriden, Waterbury	Continuation west; Wilbur Cross Parkway signed as Berlin Turnpike
New Haven	Meriden	0.00	0.00	10-11	1A-B	I-91 to Route 15 south (Wilbur Cross Parkway) – Hartford, New Haven	No eastbound access to I-91 south; signed as exits 1A (I-91 north and 1B (I-91/Route 15 south); exit nos. correspond to I-691
New Haven	Meriden	0.27	0.43	12 13	1	Preston Avenue	Eastbound exit and westbound entrance
Middlesex	Middlefield	1.22	1.96	12 13	1	East Main Street	Westbound exit and eastbound entrance
Middlesex	Middlefield	1.96	3.15	Eastern end of freeway section			
Middlesex	Middlefield	1.96	3.15			Route 147 south – Middlefield	Northern terminus of Route 147
Middlesex	Middlefield	3.88	6.24			Route 217 north – Westfield, Cromwell, Berlin	Southern terminus of Route 217
Middlesex	Middletown	5.43	8.74			Route 157 south – Middlefield, Wadsworth Falls State Park	Northern terminus of Route 157
Middlesex	Middletown	6.12	9.85			Route 3 north – Berlin, Cromwell	Southern terminus of Route 3
Middlesex	Middletown	6.70	10.78			To Route 9	Access via SR 545
Middlesex	Middletown	6.98	11.23			Route 17 south (St. Johns Square) to Route 9	Western end of Route 17 concurrency
Middlesex	Connecticut River	7.13– 7.78	11.47– 12.52	Arrigoni Bridge			
Middlesex	Portland	7.96	12.81			Route 17A north – Glastonbury	Southern terminus of Route 17A
Middlesex	Portland	9.96	16.03			Route 17 north – Glastonbury	Eastern terminus of Route 17 concurrency
Middlesex	East Hampton	12.99	20.91			Route 151 south – Middle Haddam, East Haddam, Haddam Neck, Moodus	Northern terminus of Route 151; serves Hurd State Park
Middlesex	East Hampton	13.83	22.26			Route 16 east – Colchester, Lebanon	Western terminus of Route 16
Middlesex	East Hampton	16.47	26.51			Route 196 south – Moodus	Northern terminus of Route 196
Hartford	Marlborough	20.62	33.18			Route 2 – Norwich, Hartford	Exit 15 on Route 2
Tolland	Hebron	25.90	41.68			Route 85 – Gilead, Bolton, Colchester	Serves Gay City State Park
Tolland	Hebron	26.07	41.96			Route 316 north – Andover	Southern terminus of Route 316
Tolland	Columbia	30.56	49.18			Route 87 – Andover, Lebanon	
Tolland	Columbia	32.33	52.03			US 6 to Route 32 – Andover, Hartford, Providence, RI	
Windham	Windham	34.95	56.25			Route 32 north – Coventry	Western end of Route 32 concurrency
Windham	Windham	35.69	57.44			Route 32 south – Franklin, Norwich	Eastern end of Route 32 concurrency
Windham	Windham	36.89	59.37			Route 195 north – University of Connecticut	Southern terminus of Route 195
Windham	Windham	36.91	59.40			Route 14 east – Windham	Western terminus of Route 14
Windham	Windham	38.38	61.77			US 6 – Hartford, Windham Airport, Danielson, Providence, RI	Eastern terminus; interchange
1.000 mi = 1.609 km; 1.000 km = 0.621 mi: Concurrency terminus; Incomplete access
