= Columbia Turnpike =

Columbia Turnpike may refer to:

- Columbia Turnpike (Connecticut), now mainly Route 66
- Columbia Turnpike (New York)
- Columbia Turnpike (Washington), now Bladensburg Road, and the original operator of Virginia's Columbia Pike in Arlington County

== See also ==
- Columbia Pike (disambiguation)
