= Connecticut Route 289 =

State highway in eastern Connecticut, US

Route 289
- Map of eastern Connecticut with Route 289 highlighted in red

Route information
- Maintained by CTDOT
- Length: 5.13 mi (8.26 km)
- Existed: 1964–present

Major junctions
- South end: Route 87 in Lebanon
- North end: Route 32 in Windham

Location
- Country: United States
- State: Connecticut
- Counties: New London, Windham

Highway system
- Connecticut State Highway System; Interstate; US; State; SSR; SR; Scenic
← Route 287	→ I-291

Route 289 is a state highway in eastern Connecticut, running from Lebanon center to Willimantic in the town of Windham.

== Route description ==
Route 289 begins at an intersection with Route 87 north of the town center of Lebanon. It heads north and northeast for about 4.3 miles (6.9 km) through rural areas to the Windham town line. In Windham, the road becomes known as Mountain Street and heads north to end at an intersection with Route 32 in Willimantic.

Route 289 is designated the Beaumont Memorial Highway after William Beaumont (1785–1853), a pioneering researcher in human digestion.

== History ==
In 1922, the Lebanon-Willimantic route was designated as a state highway known as Highway 214. In the 1932 state highway renumbering, Route 89 was established. It ran from Lebanon via Willimantic, Mansfield Center, Warrenville, and Westford up to Union and incorporated the entirety of old Highway 214. In 1964, Route 195 was extended south from Mansfield Center to Willimantic using part of Route 89, truncating the south end of Route 89. The former section of Route 89 south of Willimantic (old Highway 214) was renumbered to Route 289. It has had no significant changes since.

== Junction list ==
County	Location	mi	km	Destinations	Notes
New London	Lebanon	0.00	0.00	Route 87 – North Franklin, Franklin, Columbia	Southern terminus
Windham	Windham	5.13	8.26	Route 32 – Willimantic, Coventry, Univ. of Connecticut, Norwich	Northern terminus
1.000 mi = 1.609 km; 1.000 km = 0.621 mi
