= Salem Historic District (Salem, Connecticut) =

Historic district in Connecticut, United States

- U.S. National Register of Historic Places
- U.S. Historic district
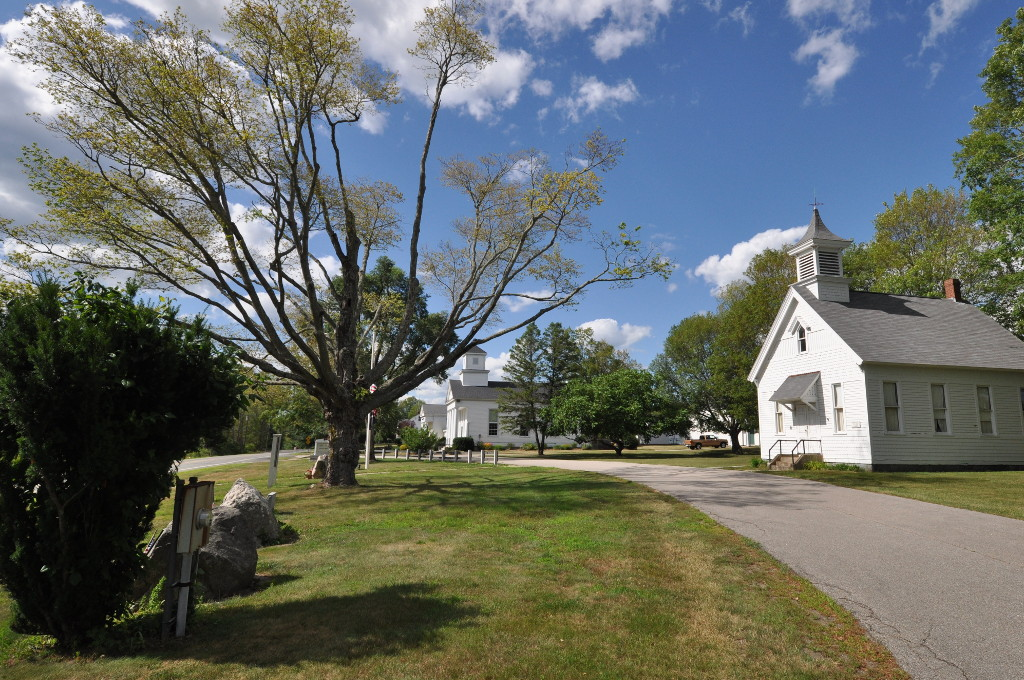

- Location within Connecticut Location within the United States
- Location: CT 85, Salem, Connecticut
- Coordinates: 41°29′13″N 72°16′27″W
- Area: 76 acres (31 ha)
- Built: 1831
- Architectural style: Greek Revival, Gothic Revival
- NRHP reference No.: 80004063
- Added to NRHP: September 22, 1980

The Salem Historic District encompasses the historic 19th-century town center of Salem, Connecticut. It extends along Connecticut Route 85 roughly from Round Hill Road to Music Vale Road, and includes the rural town's major civic and institutional buildings, as well as a number of surrounding residences. The area was developed after the town was incorporated in 1819, and was mostly built out by 1885. The district was listed on the National Register of Historic Places in 1980.

== Description and history ==
Salem was in the early 19th century a rural agricultural area, which was incorporated out of its neighboring towns in 1819, when its population was at its 19th-century height of just over 1,000. Before this time, it lacked any sort of town civic or commercial center, since those other towns provided most of the necessary services. Its center developed along the major road through the town, now CT 85, in a somewhat haphazard manner except for the constellation of buildings surrounding the modest town green. These are the c. 1840 Greek Revival Congregational Church, the Queen Anne Grange Hall (built in 1885 as a school), and the old Town House. The Town House is one of the district's oldest buildings, constructed in 1749 in Norwich and moved here in 1831 by an Episcopal congregation that added its Gothic Revival features. The congregation died out soon afterward, and the building was acquired by the town for municipal functions; it now houses the local historical society.

Other civic buildings include the town library, built about 1929 after a gift by native son, explorer, and politician Hiram Bingham III, and the remains of the Music Vale Seminary, a music school founded in 1835 and closed in 1876. Its main building was destroyed by fire in 1897, but a barn and other elements of its grounds survive near the southern end of the district. Also in that area is "The Tavern", probably the oldest building to be built in the district; it was built about 1720, and was the home of Reverend John Whittlesey. Whittlesey's house was a regular stop for travelers on the route between Hartford and New London.

== See also ==
- National Register of Historic Places listings in New London County, Connecticut
