= Connecticut Route 149 =

State highway in central Connecticut, US

Route 149
- Map of central Connecticut with Route 149 highlighted in red

Route information
- Maintained by CTDOT
- Length: 11.70 mi (18.83 km)
- Existed: 1932–present

Major junctions
- South end: Route 82 in East Haddam
- North end: Route 2 / Old Hartford Road in Colchester

Location
- Country: United States
- State: Connecticut
- Counties: Middlesex, New London

Highway system
- Connecticut State Highway System; Interstate; US; State; SSR; SR; Scenic
← Route 148	→ Route 150

Route 149 is a state highway in east-central Connecticut running from Route 82 in East Haddam center north to Route 2 in Colchester.

== Route description ==
Route 149 begins as Main Street at an intersection with Route 82 in town center of East Haddam and heads north along the Connecticut River, then northeast as East Haddam-Moodus Road along the Moodus River. It overlaps briefly with Route 151 in the village of Moodus before continuing northeast through the village of bashan towards the town of Colchester. North of Moodus, the road is known as Falls Road and Sipples Hill Road. On entering Colchester, it continues north and northeast, as Westchester Road intersecting with Route 16 in the village of Westchester. After crossing the Jeremy River, it enters the village of North Westchester, where it has an interchange with Route 2 (at Exit 16) and then terminates 0.1-mile (0.16 km) later at an intersection with Old Hartford Road (an old alignment of Route 2) at the town line with Hebron.

The section of Route 149 from the southern terminus to milepost 2.31 in East Haddam is designated as a scenic road. This portion of the road runs through the East Haddam Historic District along the banks of the Connecticut River and Moodus River.

== History ==
In the 1920s, the East Haddam-Moodus-Westchester route was designated as a state highway known as Highway 148. In the 1932 state highway renumbering, old Highway 148 was renumbered to Route 149.

== Junction list ==
County	Location	mi	km	Destinations	Notes
Middlesex	East Haddam	0.00	0.00	Route 82 – Chester, Haddam, Hadlyme, Gillette Castle State Park	Southern terminus
Middlesex	East Haddam	3.17	5.10	Leesville Road (SR 609 west)	
Middlesex	East Haddam	3.81	6.13	Route 151 north – East Hampton	Southern end of Route 151 concurrency
Middlesex	East Haddam	4.07	6.55	Route 151 south – Hadlyme, Amasa Day House	Northern end of Route 151 concurrency
New London	Colchester	8.16	13.13	Route 16 – Middletown, East Hampton, Colchester	
New London	Colchester	11.61	18.68	Route 2 – Norwich, Hartford	Exit 16 on Route 2
New London	Colchester	11.70	18.83	Old Hartford Road	Northern terminus; former Route 2
1.000 mi = 1.609 km; 1.000 km = 0.621 mi
