= Connecticut Route 87 =

State highway in eastern Connecticut, US

Route 87
- Map of eastern Connecticut with Route 87 highlighted in red

Route information
- Maintained by CTDOT
- Length: 16.62 mi (26.75 km)
- Existed: 1932–present

Major junctions
- South end: Route 32 in Franklin
- Route 66 in Columbia
- North end: US 6 in Andover

Location
- Country: United States
- State: Connecticut
- Counties: New London, Tolland

Highway system
- Connecticut State Highway System; Interstate; US; State; SSR; SR; Scenic
← Route 85	→ Route 89

Route 87 is a Connecticut state highway running from Franklin to Andover, generally in a southeast–northwest direction. The route is part of the road connecting the towns of Norwich, Lebanon, Columbia, and Andover. Route 87 is a two-lane rural collector road for its entire length.

== Route description ==
Route 87 begins as Norwich-Lebanon Road at an intersection with Route 32 in the southeast corner of the town of Franklin, just northwest of the Yantic neighborhood of Norwich. It heads northwest across the Susquetonscut Brook and railroad tracks, briefly crossing into Bozrah (for 0.18 miles), before re-entering Franklin. The road runs for another 3.5 miles (5.6 km) in the southwest part of Franklin then enters the town of Lebanon, where the road name becomes Trumbull Highway. Route 87 heads directly into the town center where it has a junction with Route 207. About a mile further, Route 289 splits off heading north towards Willimantic while Route 87 continues northwest towards Columbia. At the Columbia town center, it intersects with Route 66. North of the town center, Route 87 skirts the north shore of Columbia Lake before crossing into the town of Andover. Route 87 ends about half a mile from the town line at an intersection with US 6. Westbound US 6 continues directly into the Andover town center.

Route 87, over its entire length, is one of the last remaining sections of the Jonathan Trumbull Highway.

== History ==
The road between Norwich and Bolton Notch, through the town centers of Lebanon, Columbia, Andover, and Bolton, was chartered as a turnpike in October 1795, and was called the Hartford, New London, Windham, and Tolland County Turnpike. The toll road was in operation for about 40 years.

In 1922, when Connecticut first numbered its state highways, the route of the old turnpike was designated as State Highway 168. Modern Route 87 was established in 1932 as a renumbering of old State Highway 168 and originally ended in Bolton like the old turnpike, approximately at the current intersection of US 6 and US 44. In 1934, the Bolton Notch to Andover portion became part of U.S. Route 6A (later to become US 6) and Route 87 was truncated to its current northern end.

== Junction list ==
County	Location	mi	km	Destinations	Notes
New London	Franklin	0.00	0.00	Route 32 – Norwich, Willimantic	Southern terminus
New London	Lebanon	6.54	10.53	Route 207 – Franklin, Hebron	
New London	Lebanon	7.46	12.01	Route 289 north – Willimantic	Southern terminus of Route 289
Tolland	Columbia	13.29	21.39	Route 66 – Willimantic, Hebron	
Tolland	Andover	16.62	26.75	US 6 – Willimantic, Bolton	Northern terminus
1.000 mi = 1.609 km; 1.000 km = 0.621 mi
