= Norman Sweet Boardman Property =

Historic place in Connecticut, United States

- U.S. Historic district – Contributing property
- Built: c.1860
- Architectural style: Italianate
- Website: www.boardmanhouse.com
- Part of: East Haddam Historic District (ID83001273)
- Designated CP: April 29, 1983

The Norman Sweet Boardman Property is located in the historic district of East Haddam, Connecticut. Its building was built in c.1860, added to the National Register of Historic Places in 1983.

The house is named as the Luther Boardman House, in the 1980 historic district nomination; it is named as the Norman S. Boardman House in another source.

The house is Italianate in style. It is two-and-a-half-story frame house with a Mansard roof. It has elaborate cornice brackets in accordance with Italianate style, and a three-story tower. Its main, front porch has heavy square columns with arched openings.

The Metropolitan Museum of Art in New York City holds a catalog of the Luther Boardman & Sons, of East Haddam, who were manufacturers of silverware.
