= Connecticut Route 151 =

State highway in Middlesex County, Connecticut, US

Route 151
- Map of Middlesex County in southern Connecticut with Route 151 highlighted in red

Route information
- Maintained by CTDOT
- Length: 10.77 mi (17.33 km)
- Existed: 1932–present

Major junctions
- South end: Route 82 in East Haddam
- North end: Route 66 in East Hampton

Location
- Country: United States
- State: Connecticut
- Counties: Middlesex

Highway system
- Connecticut State Highway System; Interstate; US; State; SSR; SR; Scenic
← Route 150	→ Route 152

Route 151 is a Connecticut state highway in the Connecticut River valley running from East Haddam via Moodus to the village of Cobalt in East Hampton.

== Route description ==
Route 151 begins as Town Street at an intersection with Route 82 east of the town center of East Haddam. The road heads north for 2.7 miles (4.3 km) through the village of Little Haddam up to the village of Moodus. In Moodus, the road turns west to briefly overlap southbound Route 149 along a 0.3-mile (0.48 km) wrong way concurrency (as Moodus-Leesville Road).

Immediately after Route 149 splits off to the south, Route 151 crosses the Moodus River and then continues west for another mile. It then turns north along Leesville Road as it heads towards the Haddam town line. The southward continuation of Leesville Road connects with Route 149 and is an unsigned state highway known as State Road 609. After crossing the Salmon River into Haddam, the road becomes Moodus Road. After about 0.4 miles (0.64 km), Route 196 splits off to the north (towards East Hampton center), while Route 151 heads west, also crossing into the town of East Hampton about 0.9 miles (1.4 km) later.

In East Hampton, Route 151 continues northwest towards the Connecticut River, bypassing the village of Haddam Neck. Beyond Haddam Neck, the road becomes Middle Haddam Road, turning northward as it begins to parallel the Connecticut River. It intersects with the access road to Hurd State Park (unsigned Special Service Road 439) along the way, passing through the village of Middle Haddam then ending at an intersection with Route 66 in the village of Cobalt.

A 1.51-mile (2.43 km) section of Route 151, running from milepost 9.26 to the northern terminus, is designated a scenic road. This portion of the route runs along the east bank of the Connecticut River.

== History ==
In the 1920s, the Moodus-Haddam Neck-Cobalt route was designated as a state highway known as Highway 167. Route 151 was established as part of the 1932 state highway renumbering and incorporated old Highway 167. In 1947, Route 151 was extended south of Moodus via the village of Little Haddam to Route 82.

== Junction list ==
The entire route is in Middlesex County.

Location	mi	km	Destinations	Notes
East Haddam	0.00	0.00	Route 82 / Mount Paranssus Road (SSR 434 east) – Lyme, Chester	Southern terminus
East Haddam	2.73	4.39	Route 149 north – Moodus, Westchester	Southern end of Route 149 concurrency
East Haddam	2.99	4.81	Route 149 south – East Haddam	Northern end of Route 149 concurrency
East Haddam	4.04	6.50	Leesville Road (SR 609 east)	
Haddam	5.18	8.34	Route 196 north – East Hampton	Southern terminus of Route 196
East Hampton	8.26	13.29	Hurd Park Road (SSR 439 south)	
East Hampton	10.77	17.33	Route 66 – Portland, Marlborough	Northern terminus
1.000 mi = 1.609 km; 1.000 km = 0.621 mi
