= Connecticut Route 316 =

State highway in Connecticut, US

Route 316
- Map of Tolland County in northern Connecticut with Route 316 highlighted in red

Route information
- Maintained by CTDOT
- Length: 6.04 mi (9.72 km)
- Existed: 1963–present

Major junctions
- South end: Route 66 in Hebron
- North end: US 6 in Andover

Location
- Country: United States
- State: Connecticut

Highway system
- Connecticut State Highway System; Interstate; US; State; SSR; SR; Scenic
← Route 315	→ Route 317

Route 316 is a state highway in east central Connecticut running from Hebron to Andover.

== Route description ==
Route 316 begins at an intersection with Route 66 in Hebron and heads generally north into Andover. In Andover, it continues generally north to end at an intersection with US 6 at the town center.

== History ==
Route 316 was commissioned from SR 816 in 1963 and has had no significant changes since.

== Junction list ==
The entire route is in Tolland County.

Location	mi	km	Destinations	Notes
Hebron	0.00	0.00	Route 66	Southern terminus
Andover	5.51	8.87	Boston Hill Road (SR 603 west)	
Andover	6.04	9.72	US 6 – Hartford, Willimantic	Northern terminus
1.000 mi = 1.609 km; 1.000 km = 0.621 mi
