= Abel H. Fish House =

Historic house in Connecticut

- U.S. National Register of Historic Places
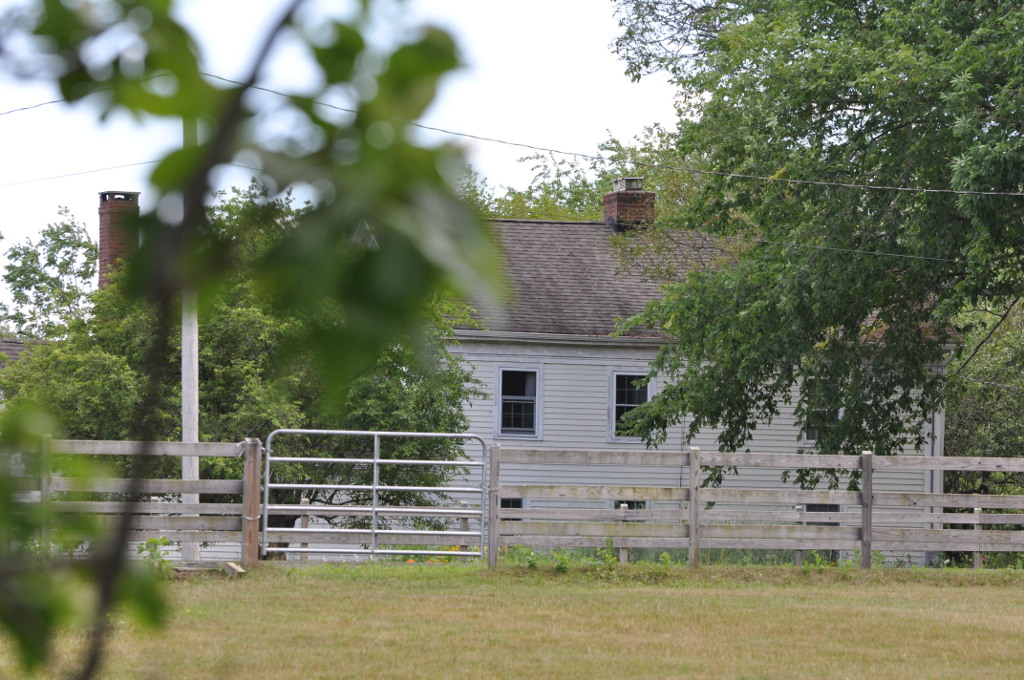
- view of the rear of the house, which faces the public way

- Location within Connecticut Location within the United States
- Location: Buckley Hill and Rathbun Hill Roads, Salem, Connecticut
- Coordinates: 41°31′47″N 72°14′55″W
- Area: 9.4 acres (3.8 ha)
- Built: 1835
- Architectural style: Greek Revival
- NRHP reference No.: 82004381
- Added to NRHP: March 2, 1982

The Abel H. Fish House is a historic house at Buckley Hill Road and Rathbun Hill Road in Salem, Connecticut, built around 1835. It is a well-preserved example of a vernacular Greek Revival farmhouse. It was listed on the National Register of Historic Places on March 2, 1982.

== Description and history ==
The Abel H. Fish House is located in the rural setting of northeastern Salem, near the junction of Buckley Hill and Rathbun Hill Roads. It is set well south of Buckley Hill Road, about 200 feet (61 m) down a lane that used to be a public road, and is oriented facing south, away from the road. It is a 2 1/2-story wood-frame structure, with a gabled roof, four-bay facade, and clapboarded exterior. It has Greek Revival features, including an entry flanked by sidelight windows and pilasters, and topped by a transom window and entablature. To the east is a single-story wing, believed to be an older structure. The interior has a number of unusual features, including a winding staircase near the entrance, and a space that may have been used for the manufacture of soap.

The house was built about 1835, and is a typical example of a period farmhouse built for a farmer of middling economic means. Abel Fish bought this farm, then 165 acres (67 ha) in 1826, where he grew potatoes and raised dairy cows and sheep. He was active in a local Baptist congregation and is referred to in local records as "Deacon Abel Fish". The house now stands on about 10 acres (4.0 ha), with much of the surrounding farmland still relatively undeveloped.

== See also ==
- National Register of Historic Places listings in New London County, Connecticut
