= Ashbel Woodward House =

Historic house in Connecticut, United States

- U.S. National Register of Historic Places
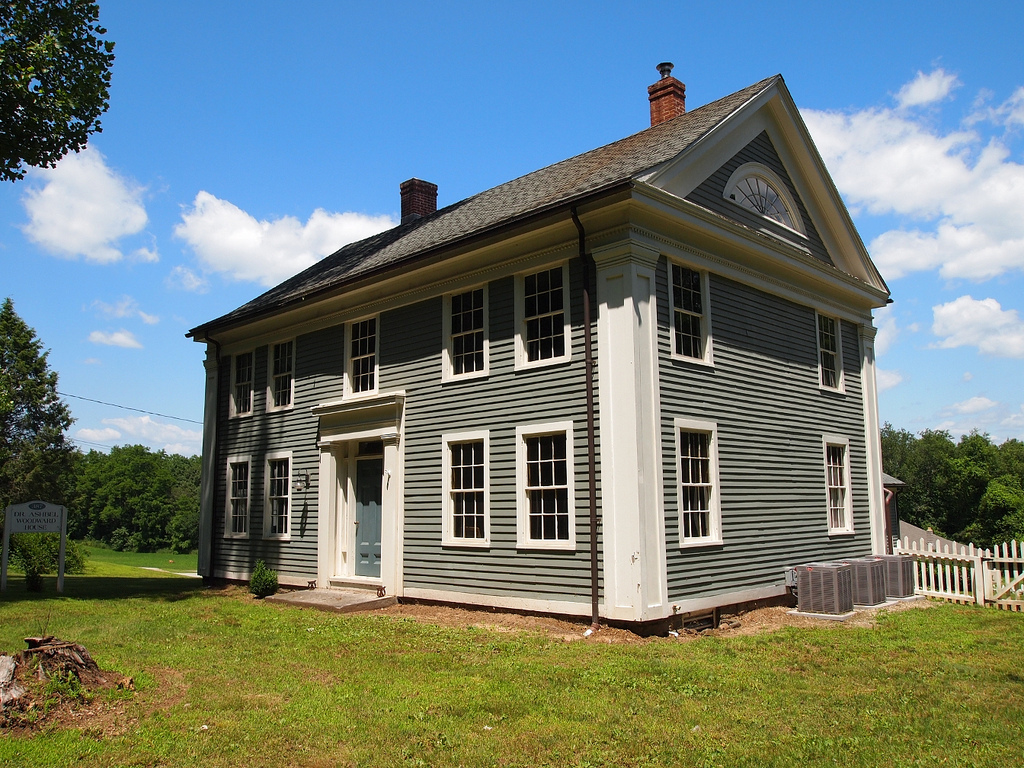

- Location within Connecticut Location within the United States
- Location: 387 CT 32, Franklin, Connecticut
- Coordinates: 41°36′17″N 72°8′12″W
- Area: 1.6 acres (0.65 ha)
- Built: 1835
- Architectural style: Greek Revival
- NRHP reference No.: 92000264
- Added to NRHP: April 8, 1992

The Ashbel Woodward House is a historic house museum at 387 Connecticut Route 32 in Franklin, Connecticut. The Town of Franklin now operates the house as the Dr. Ashbel Woodward House Museum. The house was built c. 1835, and is a fine local example of a Greek Revival house in a rural setting. It was home for many years to Ashbel Woodward, a local doctor. His descendants gave the property to the state in 1947. The house was listed on the National Register of Historic Places on April 8, 1992.

== Description and history ==
The Ashbel Woodward House is located southeast of the village center of Franklin, on the east side of Connecticut Route 32. It is a 2 1/2-story wood-frame structure, five bays wide, with a side-gable roof, clapboard siding, a granite foundation, and brick chimneys. The main entrance is centered on the front, slightly recessed under a Greek Revival surround with pilasters and entablature. The building corners are pilastered, and the side gable ends have semi-elliptical windows. An ell, apparently original as it shares the foundation with the house, extends to the rear. The property also includes two barns and a third outbuilding that probably functioned as a corn crib. The interior contains exhibits on local history and an art gallery.

The house was built about 1835, on land purchased by Doctor Ashbel Woodward, a prominent local physician, in 1834. Woodward, a graduate of Bowdoin College, settled in Franklin in 1829 and served as the town's primary medical practitioner until he died in 1885. He was also interested in local history, amassing a collection of historic and prehistoric artifacts, and writing a book-length history of Franklin, which was published in 1869. The property was given to the town by his descendants in 1947.

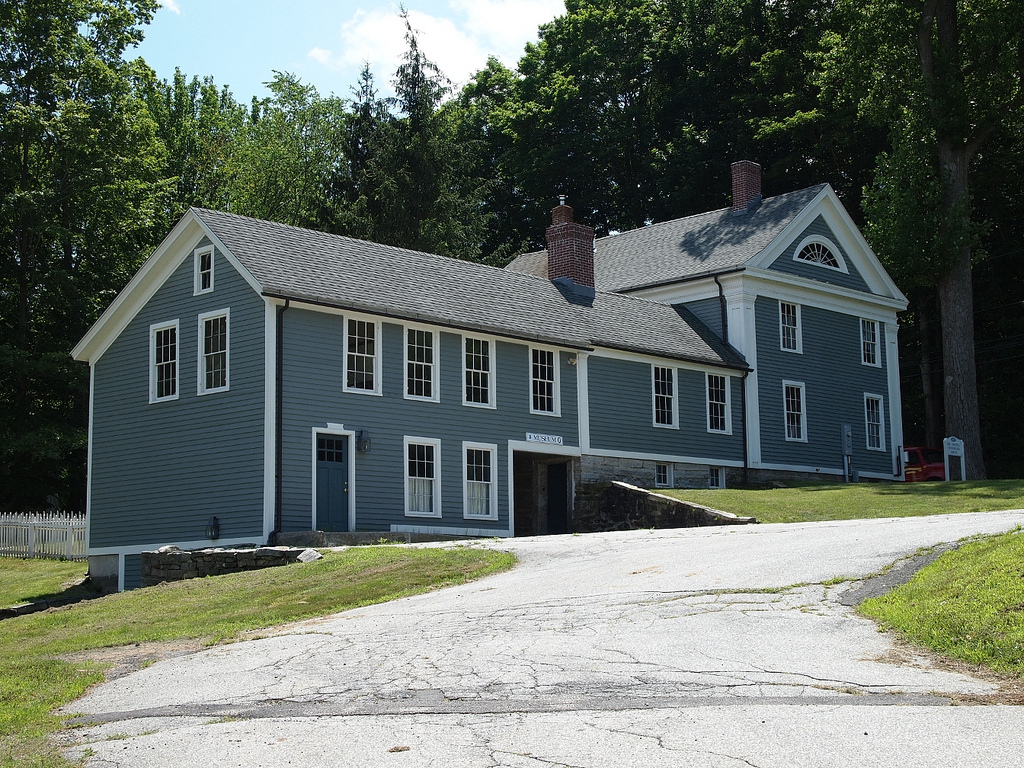
Rear view

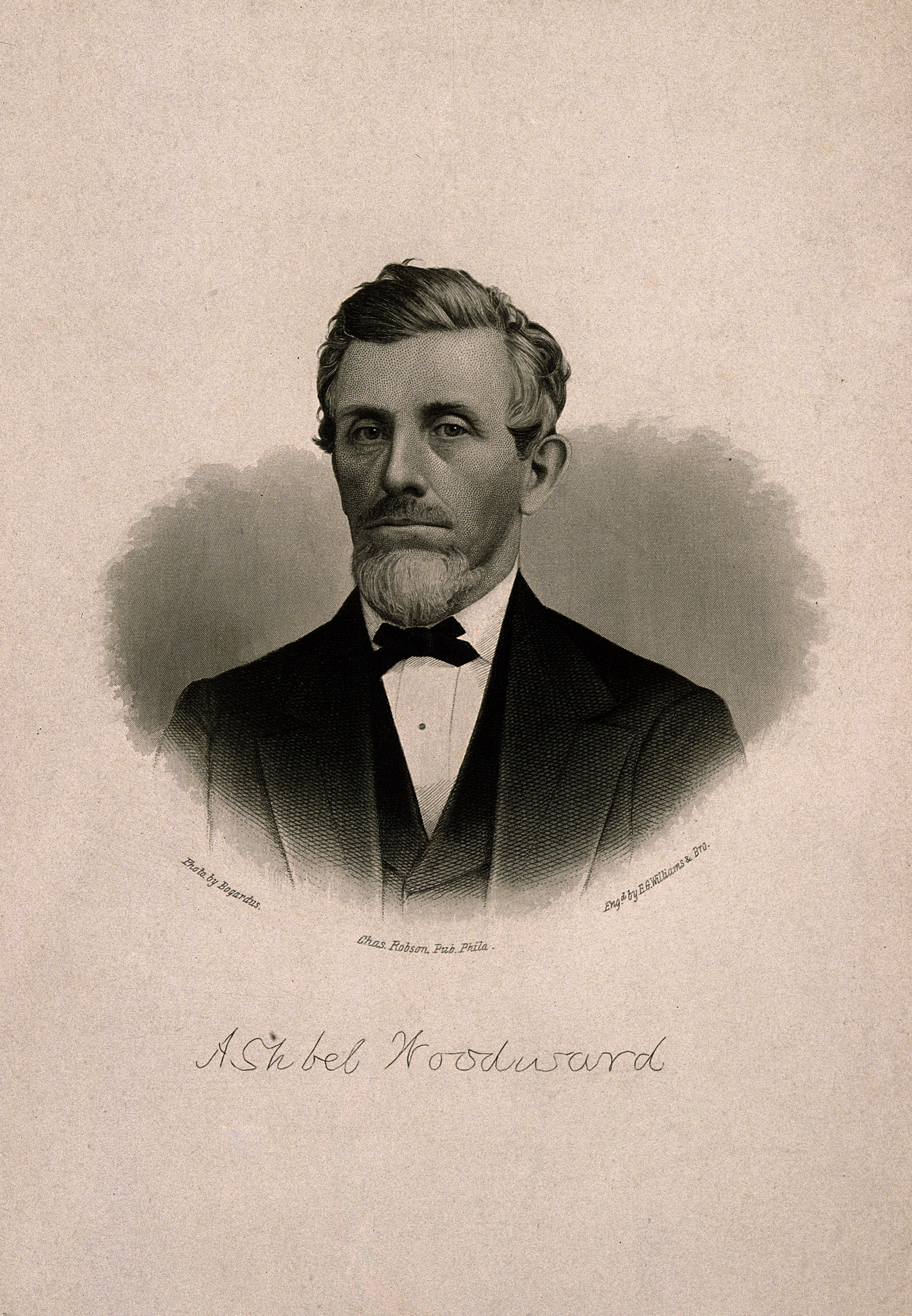
Dr. Ashbel Woodward

== See also ==
- National Register of Historic Places listings in New London County, Connecticut
