= Simon Tiffany House =

Historic house in Connecticut, United States

- U.S. National Register of Historic Places
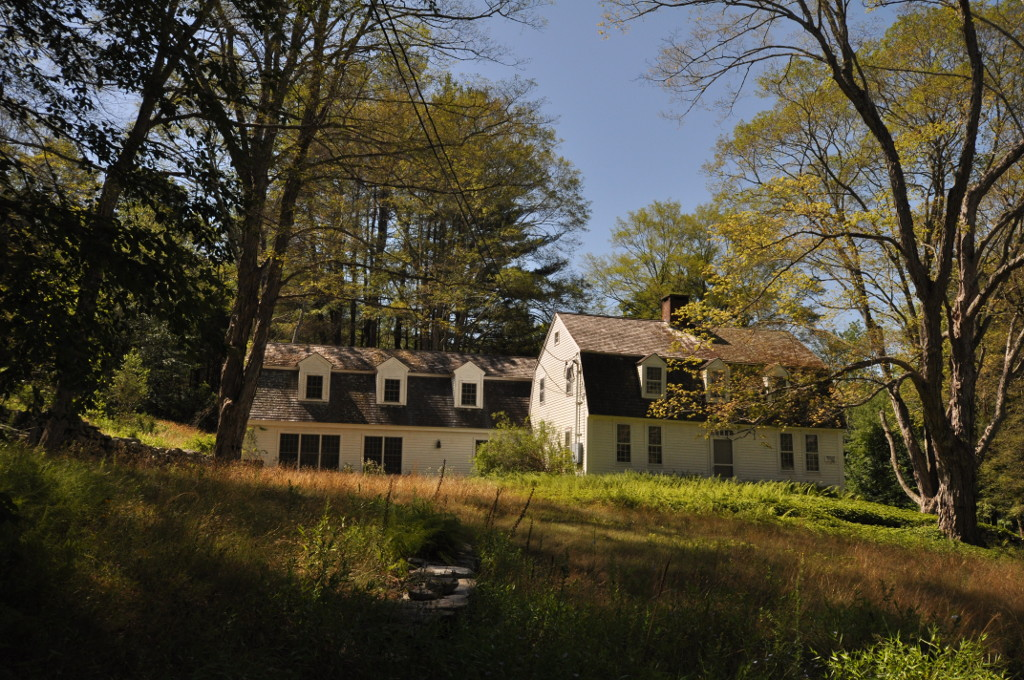

- Location within Connecticut Location within the United States
- Location: Darling Road, Salem, Connecticut
- Coordinates: 41°26′37″N 72°18′16″W
- Area: 4 acres (1.6 ha)
- Architectural style: Colonial, Federal
- NRHP reference No.: 83001290
- Added to NRHP: June 30, 1983

The Simon Tiffany House, also known as the Ebenezer Tiffany House, is a historic house on Darling Road in Salem, Connecticut. Built about 1793, it is a well-preserved example of a rural vernacular farmhouse of the period. It was listed on the National Register of Historic Places in 1983.

== Description and history ==
The Simon Tiffany House is located in a rural setting in southwestern Salem, on the south side of Darling Street near the town line with Lyme. It is a 1 1/2-story wood-frame structure, with a gambrel roof, central chimney, and clapboarded exterior. Its main facade is five bays wide, with a center entrance topped by a four-light transom window. The flanking bays are slightly asymmetrical in their placement. The interior follows a central chimney plan, with a narrow entry vestibule that has a winding stair to the upper level, and parlors on either side of the chimney. The area behind the chimney is now a single large space that was once the kitchen, but it was also once probably two separate spaces combined by later alteration. A single-story ell extends to one side, housing a modern kitchen and dining area. Some of the windows have inside shutters, a feature that rarely survives from the period.

Ebenezer Tiffany purchased the land where the house stands in 1786 from the state, which had seized the property because it had been owned by a Loyalist who fled during the American Revolutionary War. Tiffany had been leasing the land prior to its confiscation. The house was built by his son Simon on a portion of the land given to him in the 1790s. The property remained in the Tiffany family until 1895, and the house was given a careful restoration beginning in the 1920s.

== See also ==
- National Register of Historic Places listings in New London County, Connecticut
