= Music Vale Seminary =

Historical music conservatory for women in Salem, Connecticut

Coordinates: 41.4849°N 72.2744°W

Music Vale Seminary c.1855

Music Vale Seminary, also known as the Salem Normal Academy of Music, was a normal music conservatory for women in Salem, Connecticut. It was the first accredited music school in the United States. The school opened in 1835 and closed in 1876.

== Founding ==
Music Vale Seminary was founded by Oramel Whittlesey (1801–1876), a piano-maker and state senator. Born in Salem, Whittlesey was the son of prominent Methodist minister John Whittlesey. He married Charlotte Maconda Morgan (1805–1865) in 1826. The couple moved to Buffalo, New York, where Whittlesey and his two brothers ran a successful piano manufacturing business. The Whittleseys returned to Salem in 1833, where Oramel continued his piano business and began to teach music to pupils from Salem and neighboring towns. Whittlesey founded the Music Vale Seminary in 1835, and the school gained critical mass by 1839.

== History ==
Initially called Mr. Whittlesey’s School, Music Vale Seminary grew rapidly. By the mid-1800s it had become a boarding school, teaching an average of eighty pupils per year. Graduating classes averaged twenty students. Students received instruction in harmony, notation, voice, and performance on instruments such as the piano, organ, harp, and guitar. The conservatory attracted students from as far away as Kentucky, Kansas, Nova Scotia, and the West Indies.

The conservatory was authorized to confer normal degrees, or technically teacher's certificates, by the Connecticut State Board of Higher Education. The school charged $1.50 per student per day, which covered room and board, instruction, and the use of instruments for practice. Students frequently staged public performances of music and drama.

Music Vale Seminary was a family business. Mrs. Whittlesey ran much of the school's finances and day-to-day operations, and her four daughters taught at the school. The eldest daughter went on to found the Maginnis Institute of Music in New London in 1864.

The outbreak of the American Civil War in 1861 reduced enrollment, as many of the school's wealthy clientele were Southerners. The school's buildings burned down in 1868, and though quickly rebuilt at a cost of $35,000-$40,000, the school faced competition from a plethora of other conservatories. After Whittlesey's death in September 1876, his daughter, Sarah Pratt, closed the school and sold the property. In March 1897, a chimney fire burned down the premises for the second time. They were never rebuilt.

== Legacy ==
In the early 1900s, the site of Music Vale Seminary was purchased by Bela Pratt, a sculptor and grandson of Oramel Whittlesey. Another descendant, John Morgan Bodman, bought the Music Vale barn and property in the 1960s. In 1996, the Bodman family donated much of the acreage to the Salem Land Trust. This land is now protected as a wildlife habitat, part of the Eightmile River watershed. Today, all that remains of the Music Vale Academy is a privately owned red barn, built in 1849, and a state historical marker off Route 85.

== See also ==
- Maplewood Music Seminary in East Haddam, Connecticut
