= Columbia Pike =

Columbia Pike may refer to:

- Columbia Pike (Maryland), U.S. Route 29 from White Oak to Ellicott City
- Columbia Pike (Virginia), State Route 244 in Fairfax and Arlington Counties

== See also ==
- Columbia Turnpike (disambiguation)
