= Sunrise State Park =

State park in Connecticut, United States

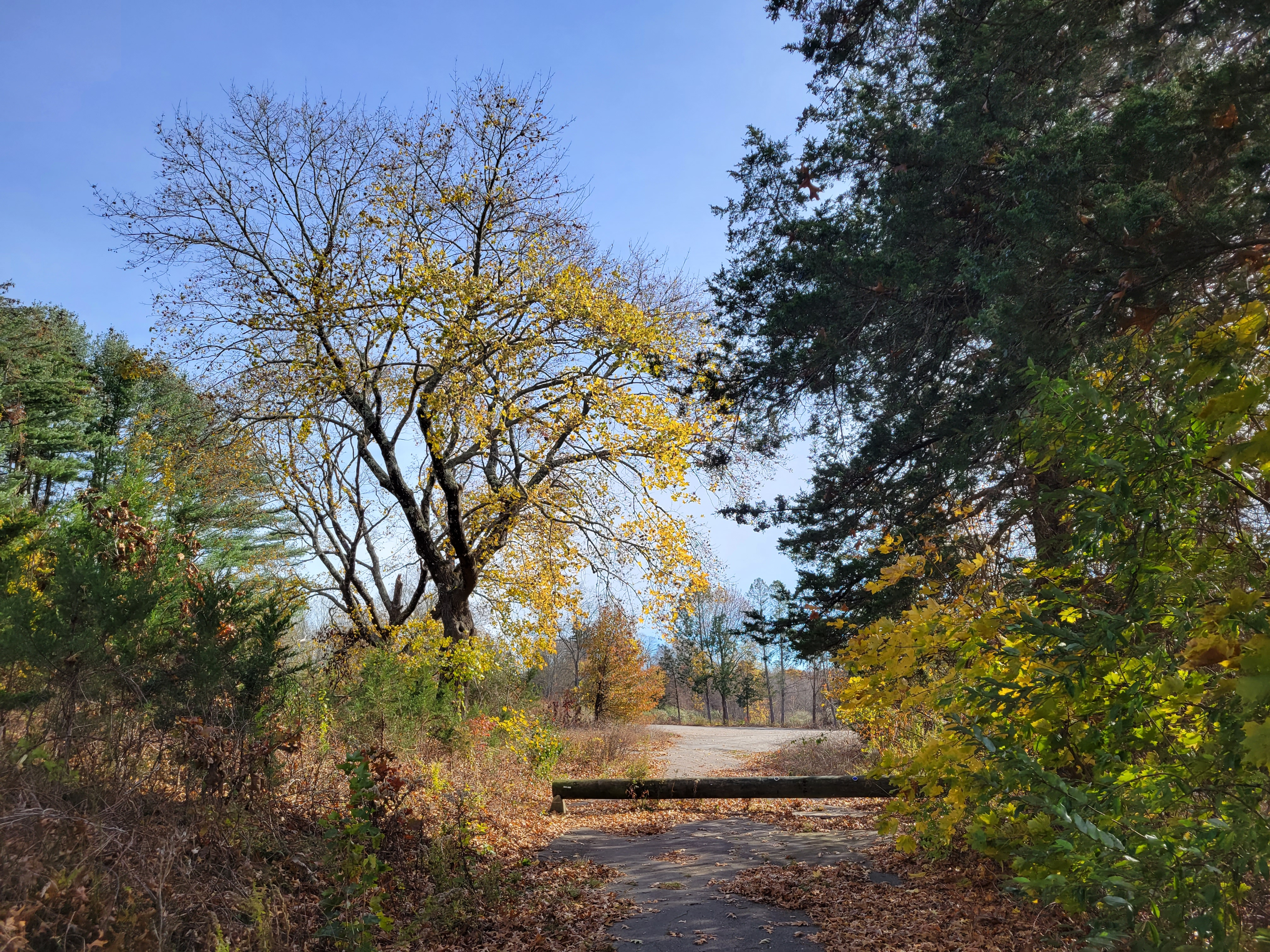
- Sunrise Hill at Sunrise State Park

- Location within Connecticut Location within the United States
- Location: East Haddam, Connecticut, United States
- Coordinates: 41°30′26″N 72°28′50″W
- Area: 143 acres (58 ha)
- Established: 2009
- Administrator: Connecticut Department of Energy and Environmental Protection
- Designation: Connecticut state park
- Website: Official website

Sunrise State Park (originally Sunrise Resort State Park) is a public recreation area occupying the site of the former Sunrise Resort in the town of East Haddam, Connecticut. The state park encompasses 143 acres (58 ha) on the east shore of Salmon River and shares an entrance with Machimoodus State Park to the south. The park is managed by the Connecticut Department of Energy and Environmental Protection.

== History ==
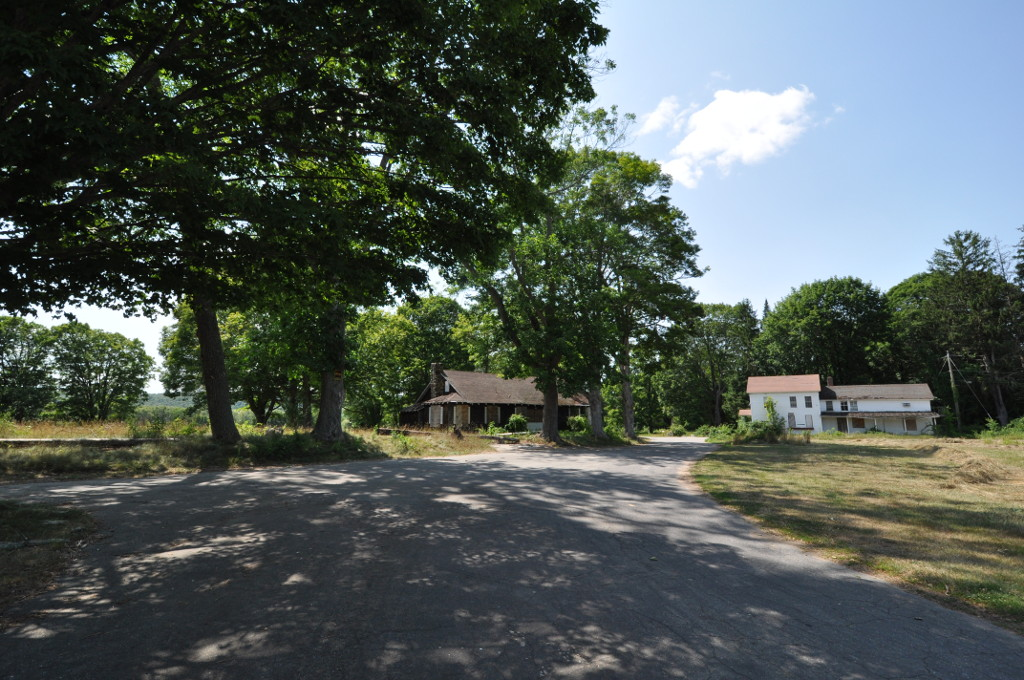
Abandoned buildings at Sunrise State Park

The property came to life as Ted Hilton's Vacation Hide-A-Way in 1916, before becoming the Frank Davis Resort, and finally Sunrise Resort, when the property was purchased by the state in 2009 for $3.2 million. At that time, the state planned to maintain the resort as a meeting place with camping and other recreational facilities in place. After failing to find redevelopers, in 2013 the Department of Energy and Environmental Protection began demolishing the dilapidated resort buildings—more than 80 in all, allowing the land to return to its natural state and leaving only patchy vestiges of asphalt basketball courts and a filled in swimming pool.

== Activities and amenities ==
The park offers hiking, fishing and concessionaire kayak rentals added to the site in 2016.
