= Woodbridge Farm =

- U.S. National Register of Historic Places
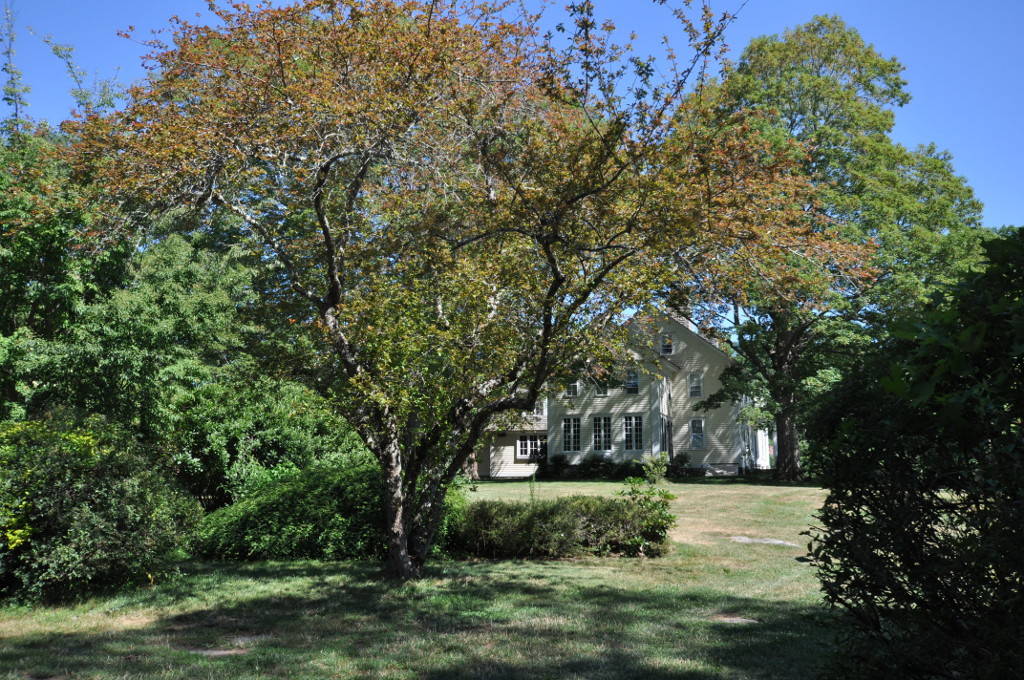

- Location within Connecticut Location within the United States
- Location: 29, 30, and 90 Woodbridge Road, Salem, Connecticut
- Coordinates: 41°27′38″N 72°18′6″W
- Area: 152 acres (62 ha)
- Built: 1792
- Architectural style: Colonial Revival, Colonial
- NRHP reference No.: 97001467
- Added to NRHP: December 1, 1997

The Woodbridge Farm is a historic farm property on Woodbridge Road in Salem, Connecticut. The property was developed by Nathaniel Woodbridge in 1791, and it had more than 200 years of cultivation, and many decades of ownership by the Woodbridge family. The property includes an early farmstead, remade in the early 20th century into a Colonial Revival country house. It was listed on the National Register of Historic Places in 1997.

== Description and history ==
The Woodbridge Farm is located on southwestern Salem, on more than 150 acres (61 ha) roughly divided by Woodbridge Road between West Road and Connecticut Route 82. All but about 45 acres (18 ha) are wooded, with the open land now mostly taken up by pasture. The main farm complex is located on the north side of Woodbridge Road. A small family cemetery is located in a wooded area east of the farmstead. The farm complex includes the main house and a detached outbuilding, which combine to form a partially enclosed farmyard. The main house has a 2-1/2 story main block, with ells extending to the left and rear, both of 20th-century construction. The main block is of wood frame construction, with a gabled roof, central chimney, and clapboarded exterior. The outbuilding is anchored by a 19th-century barn, set on an even older foundation, from which a series of stables and sheds extend to the north.

The farm was established on a 10,000 acres (4,000 ha) property purchased by Samuel Browne of Salem, Massachusetts in 1700. The Brownes leased the land to tenant farmers, and never lived here. Their land was seized during the American Revolution because William Browne, Samuel's grandson, was a Loyalist who fled to England in 1776. This parcel was purchased at auction by Thomas Shaw of New London, who built the house in 1791 for his nephew, Nathaniel Woodbridge around the time of his first marriage. Sold out of the family in the mid-19th century, it was repurchased by Woodbridge's grandson, Alfred Mitchell, in 1900. The Mitchells oversaw the conversion of the main house into a country estate house, retaining most of the original features in the main house, and adding the ells. At the time of its National Register listing in 1997, the property was owned by Mitchell's daughters.

== See also ==
- National Register of Historic Places listings in New London County, Connecticut
