= Machimoodus State Park =

State park in Middlesex County, Connecticut

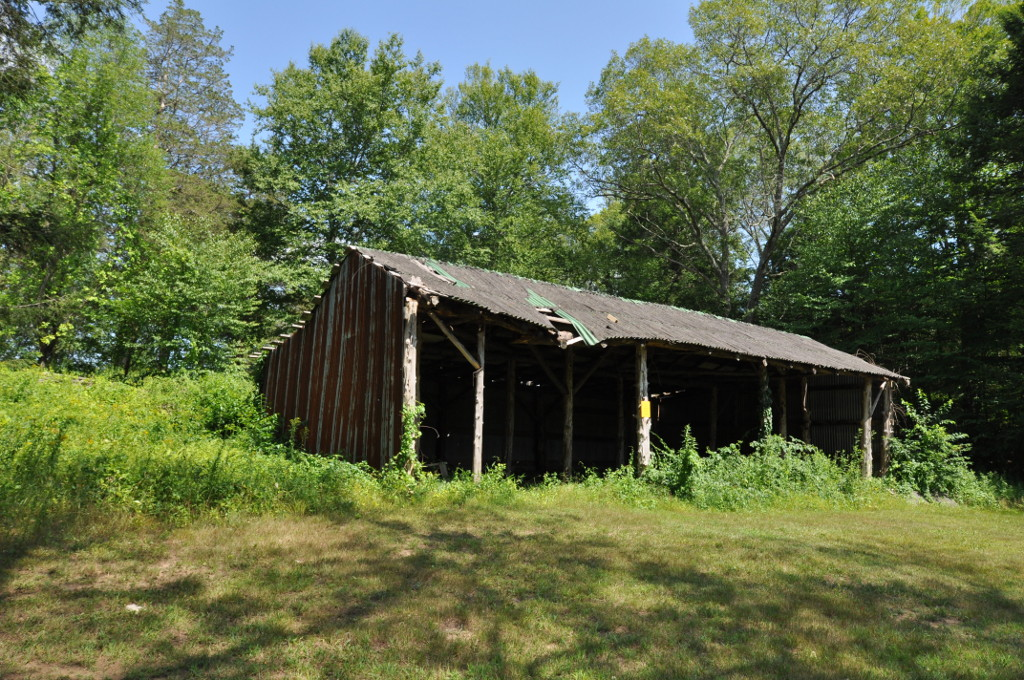

- Location within Connecticut Location within the United States
- Location: East Haddam, Connecticut, United States
- Coordinates: 41°29′45″N 72°28′40″W
- Area: 300 acres (120 ha)
- Elevation: 312 ft (95 m)
- Established: 1998
- Administrator: Connecticut Department of Energy and Environmental Protection
- Designation: Connecticut state park
- Website: Official website

Machimoodus State Park is a public recreation area located on the Salmon River near the village of Moodus in the town of East Haddam, Connecticut. The state park is bordered by Sunrise State Park to the north and by the Salmon River and Salmon Cove to the west and south. The park is managed by the Connecticut Department of Energy and Environmental Protection.

== History ==
A large Wangunk village of the same name was located in or near the modern-day park. Machimoodus translates to "the place of noises", the noises having been identified as the echoes of microearthquakes. The East Haddam village of Moodus was similarly named after the preceding Wungunk village. The park was created when the Echo Farm dairy farm was purchased by the state for $2.1 million in 1998. It lies adjacent to Sunrise State Park, a defunct summer resort that was purchased by the state in 2008.

== Activities and amenities ==
The park offers hiking, fishing, picnicking, and horseback riding. Lookout points on Mount Tom offer views of the Salmon, Moodus, and Connecticut rivers.
