= Moodus, Connecticut =

Village in East Haddam, Connecticut, United States

- Census-designated place
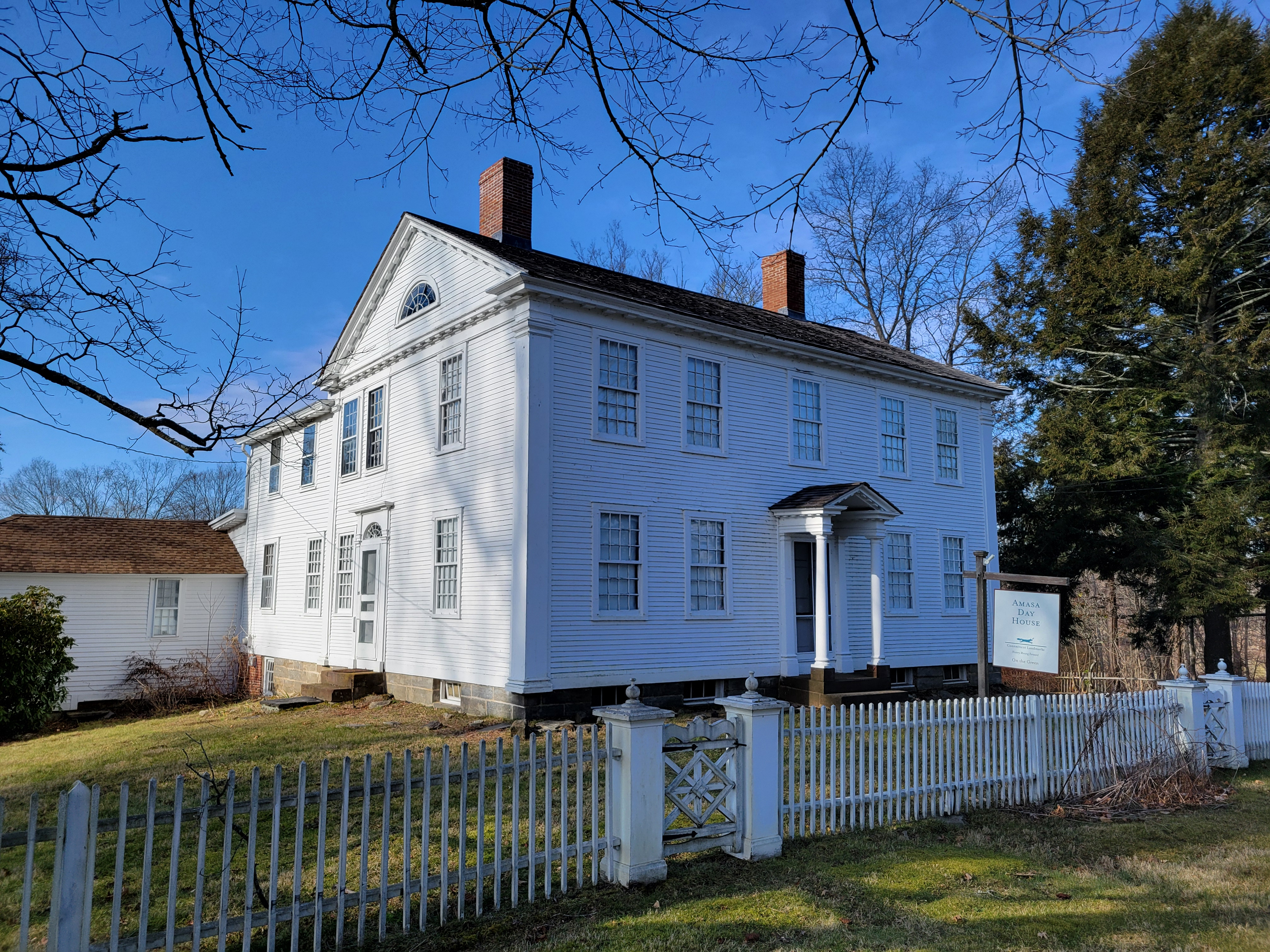
- Amasa Day House

- Location within Connecticut Location within the United States
- Coordinates: 41°30′10″N 72°27′00″W
- Country: United States of America
- State: Connecticut
- County: Middlesex
- Town: East Haddam

Area
  - Total: 3.39 sq mi (8.8 km^{2})
  - Land: 3.37 sq mi (8.7 km^{2})
  - Water: 0.02 sq mi (0.052 km^{2}) 0.59%
- Elevation: 230 ft (70 m)

Population (2020)
  - Total: 1,982
- Time zone: UTC-5 (EST)
  - Summer (DST): UTC-4 (EDT)
- ZIP code: 06469
- Area code: 860
- FIPS code: 09-49110
- GNIS feature ID: 2377832

Moodus is a village in the town of East Haddam, Connecticut, United States. The village is the basis of a census-designated place (CDP) of the same name. The population of the CDP was 1,982 as of the census of 2020.

== History ==
Prior to its purchase by English settlers in 1662, the area around Moodus was inhabited by Native American Algonquians. The names of three of the inhabiting tribes are known: the Wangunks, the Mohegans and the Nehantics. The name was derived from the Native American name for the area. The name was "Matchetmadosett" or "Matchitmoodus". It can be translated to the place of noises. Its name possibly because of the frequent earthquakes in the area. Numerous earthquakes were recorded in the area between 1638 and 1899. Loud rumblings, possibly the "Moodus Noises", could be heard for miles surrounding the epicenter of the quakes near Mt. Tom. The land, which is now the towns of Haddam and East Haddam, was purchased by settlers from the Indians in 1662 for thirty coats. In today's money, it is worth about $100.

During the nineteenth century, Moodus was advertised as the "Twine Capital of America", with twelve mills in operation. The most successful was Brownell & Company. Moodus was in an ideal location for textile production since it had access to ample water power and shipping (via the Connecticut River and the Connecticut Valley Railroad), and it was close to an enormous trading center and market, New York City. Moodus's mills primarily manufactured cotton yarn, cotton duck, and twine, and that production lasted from 1819 to 1977. The mills also produced certain related products, particularly fishing nets and pearl buttons. A part of that textile mill history is preserved in the Johnsonville historical section of Moodus, named after one of the mill owners. Brownell was a pioneer with DuPont Corporation in the production of nylon products, and Brownell still manufacturers specialized textile-related products in Moodus such as archery bowstrings, helicopter cargo nets, and tennis nets.

Moodus had many local resorts that operated during the course of the early and mid-20th century. During the summer seasons of the 1940s and 1950s, people visiting the more than 30 Moodus-area resorts quadrupled East Haddam's population to about 20,000 people. Nearby Bailey Beach on Bashan Lake was popular with local residents and vacationers alike. The resorts, boarding houses and camps of Moodus attracted Christian and Jewish vacationers primarily from New York, New Jersey, Massachusetts and other parts of Connecticut. One of the last resorts to remain in operation, Sunrise Resort, was purchased by the state of Connecticut in late 2008 to be incorporated into the adjacent Machimoodus State Park as a campground, and to protect "4,700 feet of additional frontage along the Salmon River".

The village center, dubbed "Downtown Moodus", located formerly at the intersection of routes CT 151 and CT 149, was a popular destination for resort guests. However most of the village was razed after the citizens of East Haddam controversially voted in 1967 to accept urban renewal funding to build a new commercial district for Moodus a quarter mile east, along CT 149. East Haddam was one of the smallest towns in the United States to participate in the urban renewal program.

== Geography ==
Moodus is in eastern Middlesex County, in the northwest part of the town of East Haddam. Connecticut Routes 149 and 151 pass through the village, Route 149 running northeast–southwest and Route 151 running northwest–south. Colchester is 8 miles (13 km) to the northeast, East Hampton is 7 miles (11 km) to the north-northwest, and the village of East Haddam is 4 miles (6 km) to the south, on the Connecticut River.

According to the United States Census Bureau, the Moodus CDP has a total area of 3.4 square miles (8.8 km^{2}), of which 0.02 square miles (0.05 km^{2}), or 0.59%, are water. The CDP includes the village of Bashan and some neighborhoods next to Moodus Reservoir in the northeast.

The area is subject to earthquakes, with an intensity VI quake occurring in 1568, and numerous quakes being recorded from 1638 onwards. The largest earthquake recorded for Connecticut was an intensity VII quake on May 16, 1791, near Moodus.

== Demographics ==
=== 2020 census ===
As of the 2020 census, Moodus had a population of 1,982.

The median age was 47.5 years. 18.5% of residents were under the age of 18 and 19.4% of residents were 65 years of age or older. For every 100 females there were 91.5 males, and for every 100 females age 18 and over there were 83.6 males age 18 and over.

0.0% of residents lived in urban areas, while 100.0% lived in rural areas.

There were 926 households in Moodus, of which 26.3% had children under the age of 18 living in them. Of all households, 45.9% were married-couple households, 18.9% were households with a male householder and no spouse or partner present, and 28.4% were households with a female householder and no spouse or partner present. About 33.8% of all households were made up of individuals and 13.4% had someone living alone who was 65 years of age or older.

There were 1,018 housing units, of which 9.0% were vacant. The homeowner vacancy rate was 1.4% and the rental vacancy rate was 7.1%.

Racial composition as of the 2020 census
Race	Number	Percent
White	1,809	91.3%
Black or African American	20	1.0%
American Indian and Alaska Native	7	0.4%
Asian	25	1.3%
Native Hawaiian and Other Pacific Islander	0	0.0%
Some other race	13	0.7%
Two or more races	108	5.4%
Hispanic or Latino (of any race)	85	4.3%

=== 2000 census ===
As of the census of 2000, there were 1,263 people, 529 households, and 322 families residing in the CDP. The population density was 438.8 inhabitants per square mile (169.4/km^{2}). There were 592 housing units at an average density of 205.7 per square mile (79.4/km^{2}). The racial composition of the CDP was 97.78% White, 0.40% African American, 0.48% Native American, 0.16% Asian, 0.79% from other races, and 0.40% from two or more races. Hispanic or Latino of any race were 1.27% of the population.

There were 529 households, out of which 31.8% had children younger than age 18 living with them, 43.7% were married couples living together, 11.3% had a female householder without a husband present, and 39.1% were non-families. 31.9% of all households were composed of individuals, and 14.7% had someone living alone who was 65 years of age or older. The average household size was 2.39 and the average family size was 3.05.

In the CDP, the age distribution was 25.7% younger than age 18, 5.7% from 18 to 24, 33.8% from 25 to 44, 21.9% from 45 to 64, and 12.9% who were 65 years of age or older. The median age was 37 years. For every 100 females, there were 102.1 males. For every 100 females age 18 and older, there were 95.0 males.

The median income for a household in the CDP was $52,188, and the median income for a family was $68,500. Males had a median income of $42,938 versus $33,214 for females. The per capita income for the CDP was $32,475. None of the families and 2.4% of the population were living below the poverty line, including none younger than age 18 and none of those older than age 64.

== Attractions ==
- Amasa Day House - a historic house museum on Town Street.
- Johnsonville Village - once a thriving mill community, then a Victorian Era tourist attraction, now an abandoned ghost town.
- Machimoodus State Park "Sunrise State Park"
- Cave Hill Resort
- Bailey Beach
- Bashan Lake

== Noises ==
Moodus is infamous in Connecticut for strange noises coming from the woods which have been termed "Moodus noises", and are attributed to shallow micro-earthquakes. The noises can be heard most strongly from Cave Hill, located next to Mount Tom, East Haddam and owned by the Cave Hill Resort.

In the book Legendary Connecticut, author David Philips asserts that the Moodus noises were the source of an indigenous religious cult important to local Native Americans. Local Algonquin chiefs would gather around Mount Tom in order to experience the living presence of the god Hobomok. Pequot, Mohegan and Narragansett tribes participated with this cult, and according to local Alison Guinness, the Wongums were involved as well. Hobomok was considered the spirit of the dead and worshipped by the tribe that inhabited the area. The Puritans that came to inhabit the area considered him evil. However, to the native people he was more like a Zeus or a Hades, a god that can do good or bad, depending on what mood he was in.

The Moodus noises were the basis for the otherworldly noises in H. P. Lovecraft's “The Dunwich Horror”. The local high school's athletic teams are dubbed the "Noises".
