= Salem, Connecticut =

- Town
- Town of Salem
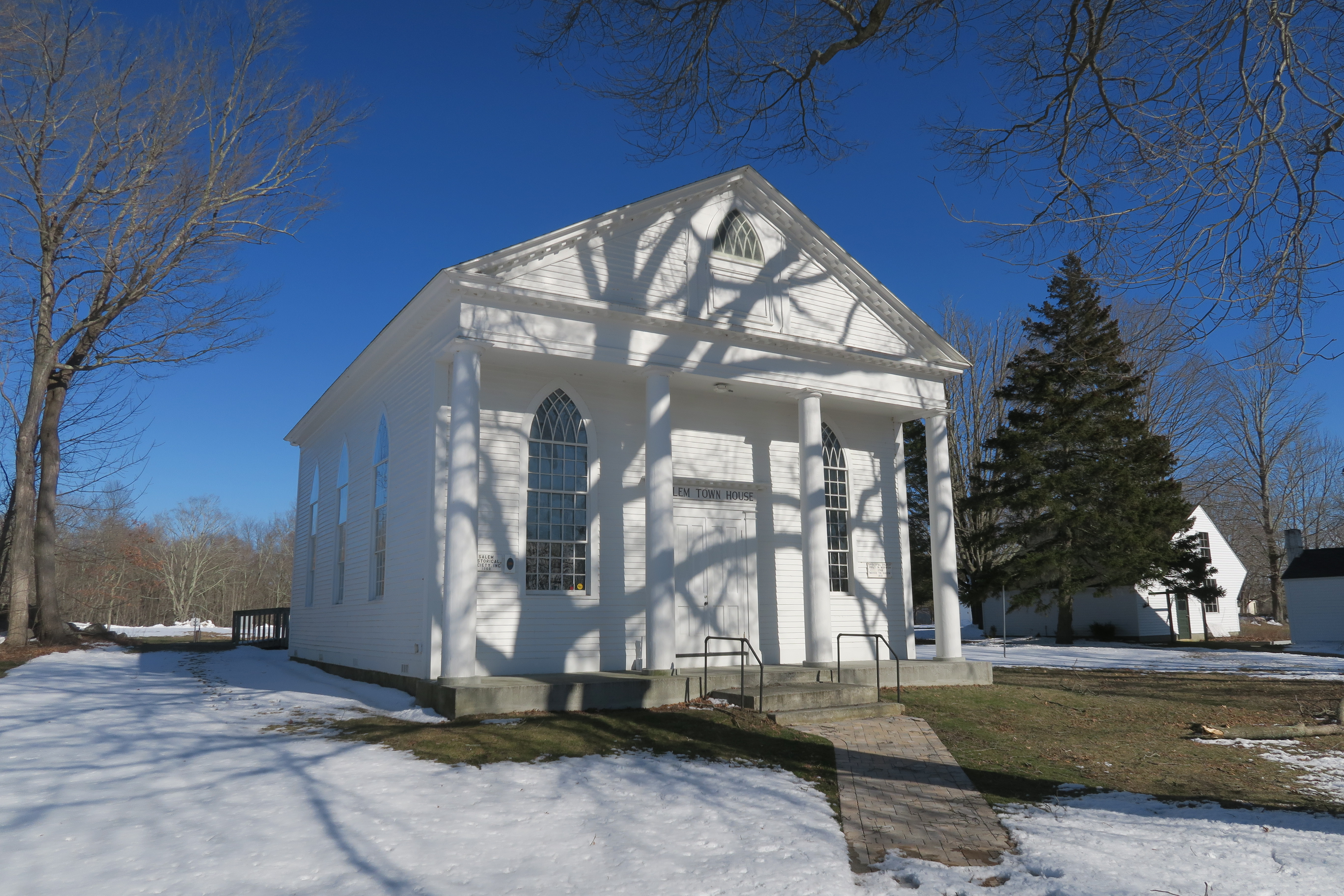
- Salem Town House

- Flag Seal

- Coordinates: 41°28′59″N 72°15′59″W
- Country: United States
- U.S. state: Connecticut
- County: New London
- Region: Southeastern CT
- Incorporated: 1819

Government
  - Type: Selectman-town meeting
  - First selectman: Ed Chmielewski

Area
  - Total: 29.8 sq mi (77.2 km^{2})
  - Land: 29.0 sq mi (75.0 km^{2})
  - Water: 0.85 sq mi (2.2 km^{2})
- Elevation: 315 ft (96 m)

Population (2020)
  - Total: 4,213
  - Density: 145/sq mi (56.2/km^{2})
- Time zone: UTC-5 (Eastern)
  - Summer (DST): UTC-4 (Eastern)
- ZIP Code: 06420
- Area codes: 860/959
- FIPS code: 09-66210
- GNIS feature ID: 0213499
- Website: www.salemct.gov

Salem is a town in New London County, Connecticut, United States. The town is part of the Southeastern Connecticut Planning Region. The population was 4,213 at the 2020 census.

== History ==
=== Pre-incorporation ===
The area was originally inhabited by the Mohegan people. The first settlement of European origin in present-day Salem (then part of the town of Montville) was deeded in 1664. The settlers were of English origin. In the early 18th century, more settlements appeared in what was then Colchester. During this time period, the area was called "Paugwonk". The small neighborhood around the Gardner Lake Firehouse on Route 354 is sometimes still referred to by that name.

Because of the remote location of these settlements and the considerable distance to churches, the people petitioned the Connecticut General Court for a new parish in 1725. It was named New Salem Parish, in honor of Colonel Samuel Browne, the largest landowner at the time, who was from Salem, Massachusetts. Recent archaeological evidence suggests that Colonel Browne owned slaves and operated one of the largest slave plantations in New England. The people of New Salem strongly supported the Patriot cause in the Revolution. Salem was the first town in the state of Connecticut to have a plantation, owned by the Browne family.

=== 1819 to the present ===
Salem was incorporated as a town in 1819 from lands of Colchester, Lyme, and Montville. The rocky and craggy land that constituted much of the town kept the population low and new settlement at a minimum. Salem has always been a crossroads town; the old Hartford and New London Turnpike (now Route 85) was a toll road, traveled frequently by legislators during the winters of the 19th century when the Connecticut River was impassable. The Turnpike provided stage coach service until the 1890s.

==== Music Vale Seminary ====
Salem became a well-known location upon the founding of Oramel Whittlesey's Music Vale Seminary in 1835. Students of the school not only learned music, but also provided self-sustenance through farming, as did most Salem households at the time. Pianos were manufactured up the Hartford and New London Turnpike about two miles (3 km) north from the seminary, at the present location of the firehouse and Maple Shade General Store. The seminary burned down and was rebuilt. However, when Whittlesey died in 1867, it was the beginning of the end for the school; when it burned down again shortly thereafter, it was never rebuilt. Today, all that remains of the seminary is a barn and a state historical marker.

==== Early rural electrification in the United States ====
Salem is the site of one of the first rural electrification projects in the country, at the farm of Frederick C. Rawolle Jr. Rawolle was an engineer from New York who retired at the age of 32 after he sold to a major manufacturer the patent rights of an explosive device he had invented to fracture oil wells. His net worth at this time was approximately $50,000,000, an enormous sum for the time period. He decided to settle in the remote woods of Salem and build a farm, purchasing 2,800 acres (11 km^{2}) of land between 1917 and 1924, completely surrounding Mountain Lake and Fairy Lake. This land, once called Paugwonk, had been jointly owned by a Niantic sachem named Sanhop, a Mohegan named Chappattoe and another kinsman from Uncas. The combined area became known as Fairy Lake Farm, located near the lake of the same name. Carr Pond, which today supplies water to the city of New London, was created by Rawolle in 1920 from Fairy Lake as a means of docking his boat near the turnpike.

Rawolle decided to generate his own electricity when he learned that bringing transmission lines to his farm from the city of New London, about 12 miles (19 km) away, would be virtually impossible. At a cost of about one million dollars, extremely expensive at the time for a single project, a hydroelectric system was completed in 1922. Airplanes flying from New York to Boston used the glimmering lights of Fairy Lake Farm as guidance. Rawolle also opened a store in New London to sell produce from the farm. This endeavor collapsed, however, when the stock market crashed in 1929 and Rawolle lost all of his money. He died in 1954; the large stone mansion he lived in at the farm is still standing at the end of Horse Pond Road, though it is abandoned.

==== Hiram Bingham III and IV ====
Hiram Bingham III, from Salem, was an adventurer, U.S. senator, and explorer who rediscovered Machu Picchu in Peru in 1911. He retrieved artifacts for Yale University, which in 2011 returned many items to Cusco, Peru, pursuant to an agreement with the Peruvian government. His son, Hiram Bingham IV, was the Vice Consul in Marseille, France, during World War II, and rescued thousands of Jews from death at the Nazi concentration camps. Much of the Bingham family still lives in Salem and is active in town politics and local issues. Hiram IV died in 1988, and a U.S. Postal Stamp was issued in his honor on May 30, 2006. In 2011 the Simon Wiesenthal Center produced a film tribute to Hiram ("Harry") Bingham IV concerning his life-saving actions during the war.

=== Salem today ===
Over the decades, Salem has slowly progressed from a small and remote farming town to a bedroom community of about 4,000; in the 1990s, it was one of the fastest growing municipalities in the state. However, it is still a small town by Connecticut standards. It did not even have its own ZIP code until the mid-1990s; before then, it was shared with Colchester.

During its early years, Salem had several schoolhouses scattered throughout town, like most New England communities of the time; one is still visible on White Birch Road. Salem School was built in 1940 near the town green as little more than a large schoolhouse. Several additions have been built since then, the most recent opening in 1994. Today, Salem School is one of the largest K–8 schools in the state, with about 600 students. Students in grades 9 through 12 attend high school in the neighboring town of East Lyme; this will be the case until at least 2039 , when the current co-op agreement between the two towns expires.

Connecticut Route 85 was commissioned from the old turnpike in 1932. Traffic increased considerably over the next several decades, and the Route 11 expressway was proposed as an alternate through route. Lack of funding and bureaucratic issues caused construction to halt in 1972 in Salem at Route 82. The project was revived in the mid-1990s, and in August 2004, Route 11 was announced as a federal high priority project under President Bush's Executive Order 13274, during a surprise visit by U.S. Transportation Secretary Norman Mineta to Salem. The new highway was to be accompanied by a "greenway" of preserved land, a first in the nation. However, the State of Connecticut halted work on the project in 2009, citing funding issues. Most Salem residents favor completion because it would remove through traffic from local roads. Though effectively canceled, the highway project remains a frequently discussed political issue in the town.

Salem has very little commercial and industrial development, which has not kept pace with the rapid residential growth; the "four corners" area, at the busy junction of Route 85 and Route 82, is virtually all that exists. As a result, taxes in the town are generally high.

The last operating dairy farm in Salem, near Gardner Lake, which was an official supplier of Cabot cheese, closed in 2004, though there remains a small dairy goat farm, Syman Says Farms, that produces goat milk bath and body products.

=== Salem traditions ===
Salem is host to several long-standing traditions. Some annual traditions include:

- Memorial Day Parade
- Salem 5K Road Race
- Salem Apple Festival, held at the end of October on the town green. It features apple pies, apple fritters, and hot dogs with apple sauerkraut. Pies and apple merchandise are also sold across the street from the town green. In concert with the festival, the Friends of the Salem Public Library holds its annual book sale at Salem School.

== On the National Register of Historic Places ==
- Abel H. Fish House – Buckley Hill and Rathbun Hill Roads (added 1982)
- Salem Historic District – state Route 85 (added 1980)
- Ebenezer Tiffany House – 460 Darling Road (added 1983)
- Woodbridge Farm – 29, 30, and 90 Woodbridge Road (added 1997)

== Salem Town Green ==
As in many New England towns, Salem's town green was originally centered around a church. The current church, Salem Congregational Church, was built in 1840. The Music Vale Seminary was about a half mile south of the green itself. The town hall, library, recreational fields, and Salem School are all located nearby. A grange and historical society are built around the green.

The green has changed little over the past two hundred years, the most changes being in the last two decades. Salem School has undergone many additions since its original construction in 1940. The townspeople in 2003 voted overwhelmingly in a referendum to build a new library, which opened in 2004. The new structure replaced the original library, a tiny structure donated by the Bingham family in 1928, which is now vacant. Also in 2004, construction began on expanded recreational fields.

== Geography ==
According to the United States Census Bureau, the town has a total area of 29.8 square miles (77.2 km^{2}), of which 29.0 square miles (75.0 km^{2}) is land and 0.8 square miles (2.1 km^{2}), or 2.79%, is water.

== Demographics ==
Historical population
Census	Pop.	Note	%±
1820	1,053		—
1850	764		—
1860	830		8.6%
1870	717		−13.6%
1880	574		−19.9%
1890	481		−16.2%
1900	468		−2.7%
1910	443		−5.3%
1920	424		−4.3%
1930	403		−5.0%
1940	504		25.1%
1950	618		22.6%
1960	925		49.7%
1970	1,453		57.1%
1980	2,335		60.7%
1990	3,310		41.8%
2000	3,858		16.6%
2010	4,151		7.6%
2020	4,213		1.5%
U.S. Decennial Census

As of the census of 2000, there were 3,858 people, 1,358 households, and 1,075 families residing in the town. The population density was 133.2 inhabitants per square mile (51.4/km^{2}). There were 1,655 housing units at an average density of 57.2 per square mile (22.1/km^{2}). The racial makeup of the town was 95.49% White, 0.83% African American, 0.60% Native American, 1.48% Asian, 0.29% from other races, and 1.32% from two or more races. Hispanic or Latino of any race were 1.22% of the population.

There were 1,358 households, out of which 43.5% had children under the age of 18 living with them, 68.9% were married couples living together, 6.8% had a female householder with no husband present, and 20.8% were non-families. 15.6% of all households were made up of individuals, and 4.2% had someone living alone who was 65 years of age or older. The average household size was 2.84 and the average family size was 3.20.

In the town, the population was spread out, with 29.4% under the age of 18, 5.3% from 18 to 24, 32.8% from 25 to 44, 25.9% from 45 to 64, and 6.6% who were 65 years of age or older. The median age was 37 years. For every 100 females, there were 99.4 males. For every 100 females age 18 and over, there were 99.4 males.

The median income for a household in the town was $68,750, and the median income for a family was $75,747. Males had a median income of $48,173 versus $36,364 for females. The per capita income for the town was $27,288. About 0.6% of families and 1.0% of the population were below the poverty line, including 1.3% of those under age 18 and 2.8% of those age 65 or over.

== Education ==
The Salem School District operates a Pre-K–8 school that serves the town.

Residents in grades 9 through 12 are zoned to East Lyme High School in East Lyme, which is a part of East Lyme Public Schools.

== Miscellaneous ==
There is a Witch Meadow Lake and Witch Meadow Campground in Salem, perhaps a tongue-in-cheek homage to the infamous witch trials of Salem, Massachusetts.

== Notable people ==
- Hiram Bingham III (1875–1956), Connecticut governor, U.S. Senator, adventurer, discovered Machu Picchu; long-time town resident
- Hiram Bingham IV (1903–1988), American Vice Consul in Marseille, France, during World War II; rescued thousands of Jews from the Nazis during the Holocaust; hometown and lengthy resident
- Daryl Blonder (1981–2012), television actor and author
- Samuel M. Hopkins (1772–1837), lawyer and congressman for New York; born in Salem
- Rachel Robinson (born 1922), widow of baseball great Jackie Robinson and civil rights activist; lengthy resident
