= East Haddam Historic District =

Historic district in Connecticut, United States

- U.S. National Register of Historic Places
- U.S. Historic district
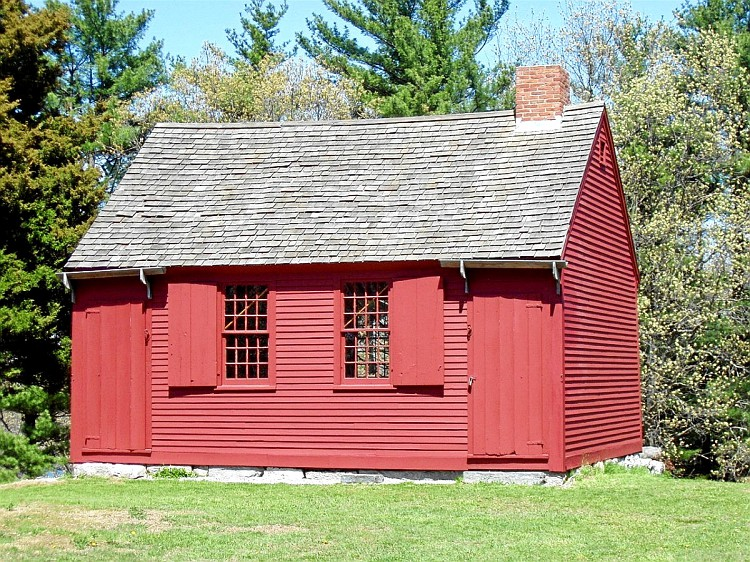
- The Nathan Hale Schoolhouse

- Location within Connecticut Location within the United States
- Location: CT 149, Broom, Norwich, Creamery, Lumberyard, and Landing Hill Roads, East Haddam, Connecticut
- Coordinates: 41°27′23″N 72°27′45″W
- Area: 110 acres (45 ha)
- Architectural style: Greek Revival, Federal, Late Victorian
- NRHP reference No.: 83001273
- Added to NRHP: April 29, 1983

The East Haddam Historic District is a 110-acre (45 ha) historic district in East Haddam, Connecticut. It includes buildings from two 18th-century settlements of the town on the east bank of the Connecticut River, Upper Landing and Lower Landing. The district is linear and runs along Route 149. It was listed on the National Register of Historic Places in 1983, and includes a diversity of 18th and 19th-century styles, as well as the town's main civic structures, and the Goodspeed Opera House. Also included in the district are two monuments, one to Nathan Hale and another to Gen. Joseph Spencer, a park, and a cemetery.

East Haddam was settled in 1685, and was originally part of Haddam. Ferry service was introduced on the river in 1695, and developed at several points. The Upper and Lower Landings each developed somewhat independently, but over time became united into a long linear village, caused in part by the steep terrain immediately to the east which limited growth in that direction. Both landings flourished up to the American Civil War, as centers of international commerce doing business with the East and West Indies. The landings declined in economic importance after the war, owing to the rise of the railroad as the principal means of commercial transport, which was run up the west side of the river. The southern landing eventually became more significant as a tourist destination, and is where the East Haddam Bridge is now located, as is the village's commercial district.

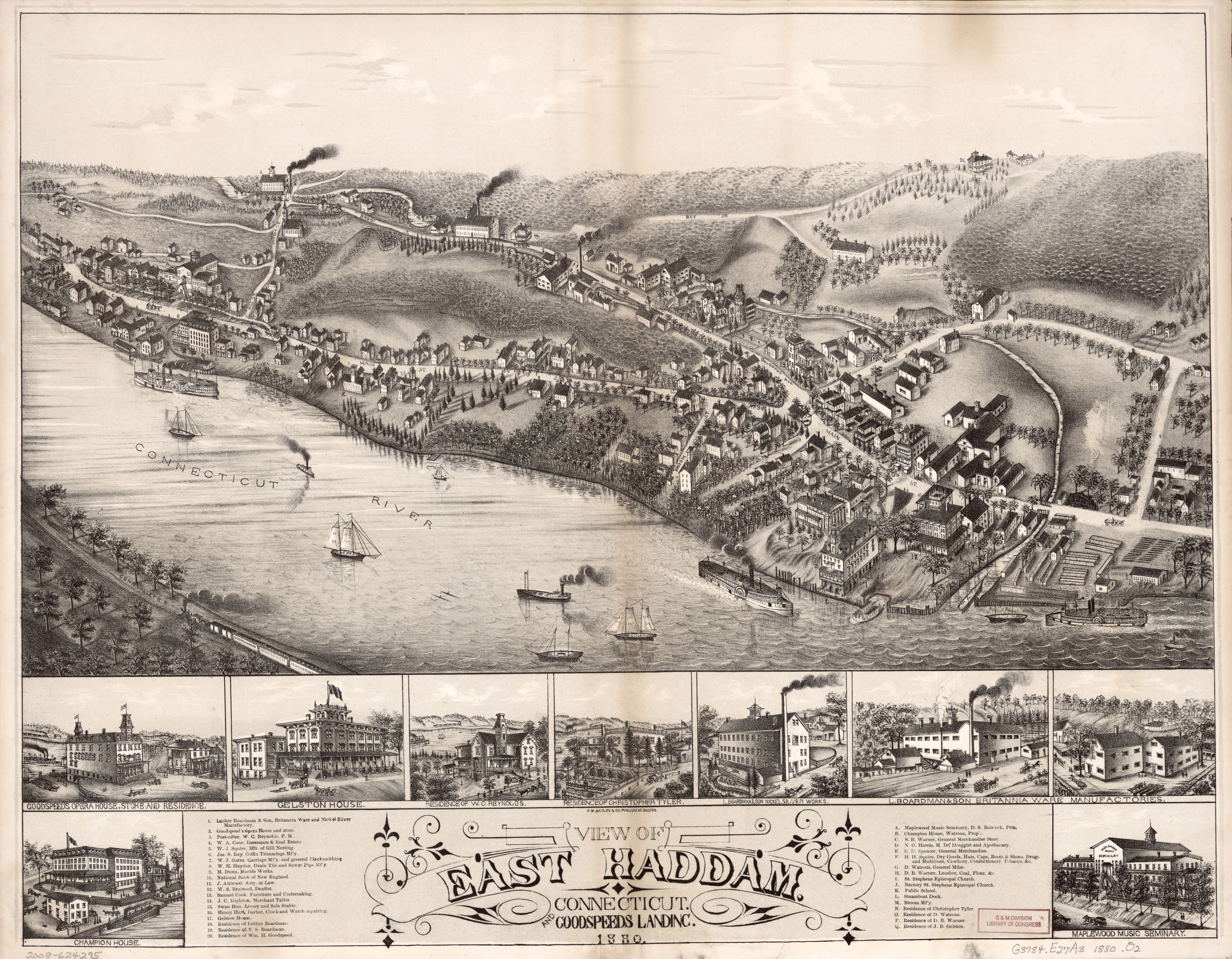
View of East Haddam and its sights from 1880

Epaphroditus Champion, son of Henry Champion lived in East Haddam. The Maplewood Music Seminary was at Uooer Landing.

== See also ==
- National Register of Historic Places listings in Middlesex County, Connecticut
