= Maplewood Music Seminary =

Former music school in Connecticut

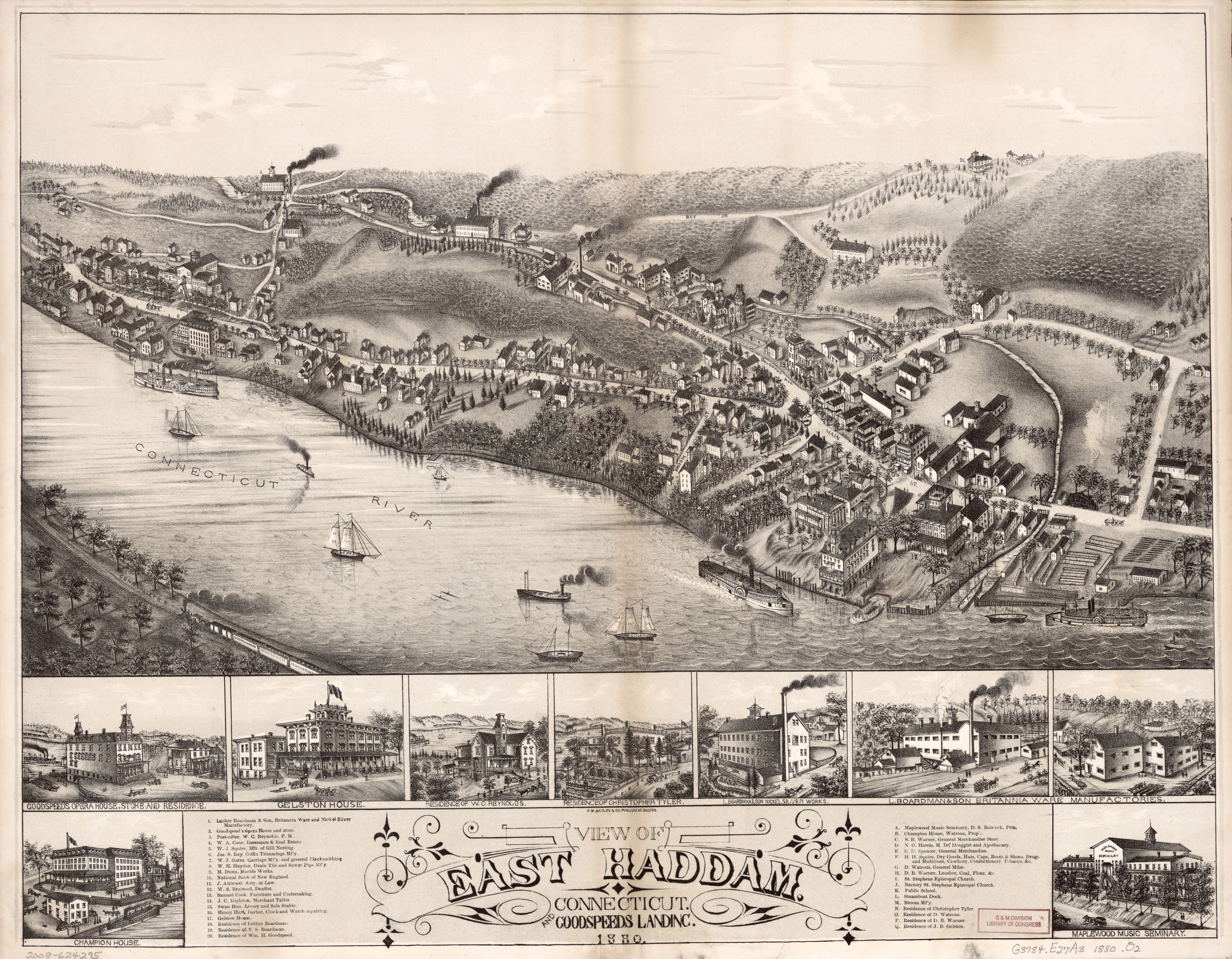
Bird's eye view depiction of East Haddam, Connecticut in 1880 showing Maplewood Music Seminary's location as well as an inset image of it at bottom right

Maplewood Music Seminary was a music school for young women in East Haddam, Connecticut. In 1875 it had more than one hundred enrolled students. It was located above Upper Landing and performances it hosted included light operas, plays, and pageants although it was best known for opera. It was described as "posh, and the spring commencement ceremony was a noted social event. Its graduation program was housed in the Connecticut River Museum.

It was established around 1865 by Dwight Babcock, and operated for twelve years before malarial outbreaks caused its struggle and decline. Professor Dwight S. Babcock afterwards "removed" to Rhode Island.

== Personnel ==
D. S. Babcock was its principal. He taught piano, organ, harp, and guitar. The girls sang and could be heard from Champion House. Their songs included those from the opera Martha by Friedrich von Flotow (1812-1883). Maltbie Babcock (August 3, 1858-May 18,1901) taught at the school. In 1872, the Connecticut School Journal praised Babcock and his school noting the views from it over the Connecticut River.

== Publications ==
- In 1867, "Grand Musical Entertainment, at Champion Hall, East Haddam, Conn., on Tuesday, April 16, 1867" by Dwight Samuel Babcock was published.
- An 1871-1872 35 page school catalogue was published.
