= Portland (CDP), Connecticut =

Census-designated place in Connecticut, United States

Portland, Connecticut
- Census-designated place
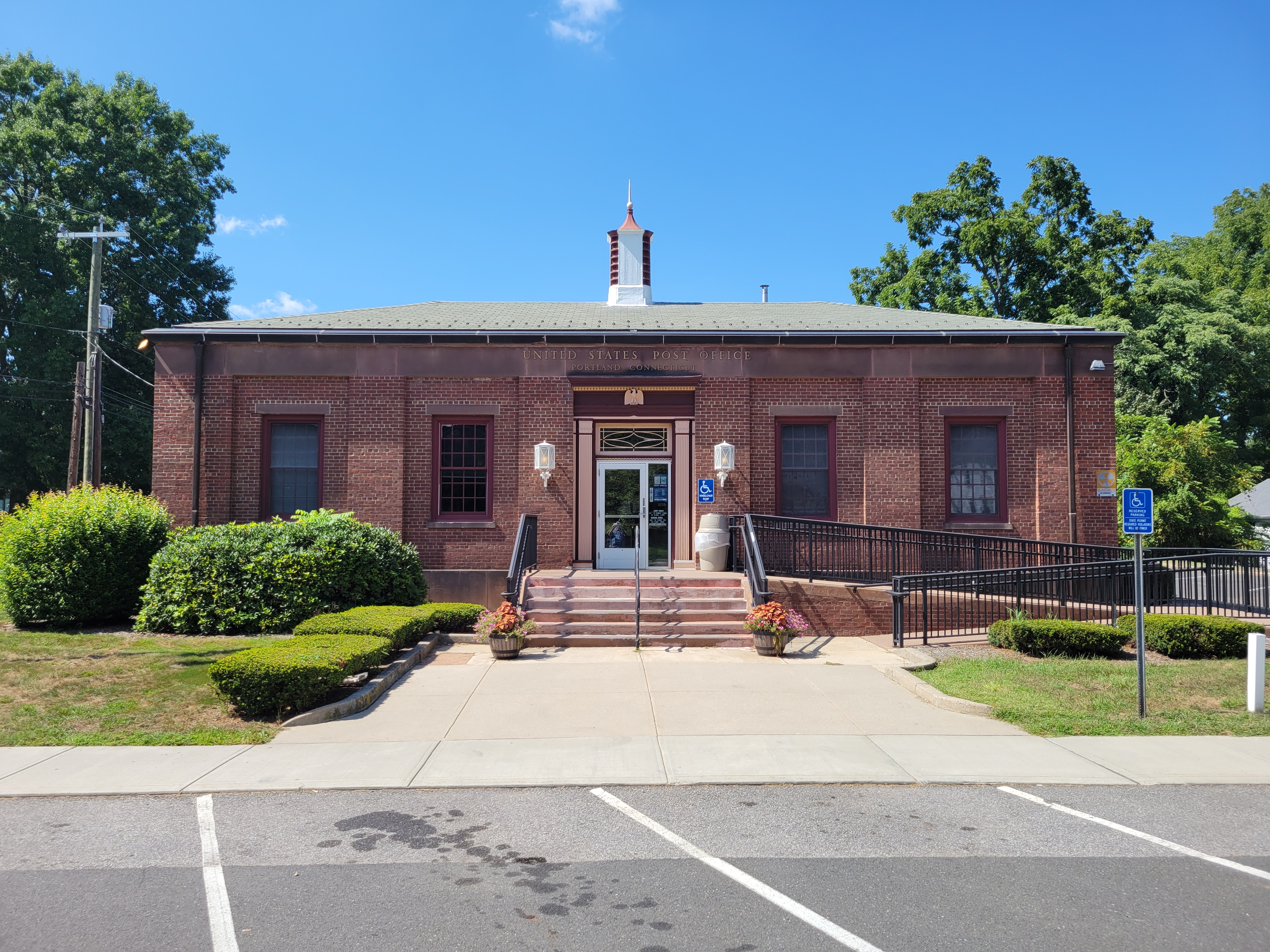
- Post Office

- Location within Connecticut Location within the United States
- Coordinates: 41°34′44″N 72°37′54″W
- Country: United States
- State: Connecticut
- County: Middlesex
- Town: Portland

Area
  - Total: 6.63 sq mi (17.16 km^{2})
  - Land: 6.00 sq mi (15.53 km^{2})
  - Water: 0.63 sq mi (1.63 km^{2})
- Elevation: 170 ft (52 m)

Population (2020)
  - Total: 5,813
  - Density: 970/sq mi (374.4/km^{2})
- Time zone: UTC-5 (Eastern (EST))
  - Summer (DST): UTC-4 (EDT)
- ZIP Code: 06480
- Area codes: 860/959
- FIPS code: 09-61870
- GNIS feature ID: 2377853

Portland is a census-designated place (CDP) comprising the primary village and adjacent residential land in the town of Portland, Middlesex County, Connecticut, United States. It is located in the southwestern part of the town, bordered to the west and south by the Connecticut River, which forms the border with Cromwell to the west and Middletown to the south. The Portland CDP extends north along Main Street (Connecticut Route 17A) to its junction with Gospel Lane (Connecticut Route 17) at Fogelmarks Corners, and the eastern extent of the CDP is at Rose Hill Road and Collins Hill Road. The CDP includes the neighborhood of Gildersleeve in the north.

As of the 2020 census, the CDP had a population of 5,813, out of 9,384 in the entire town of Portland.
