= Franklin, Connecticut =

Town of Franklin
- Town
- Franklin, Connecticut
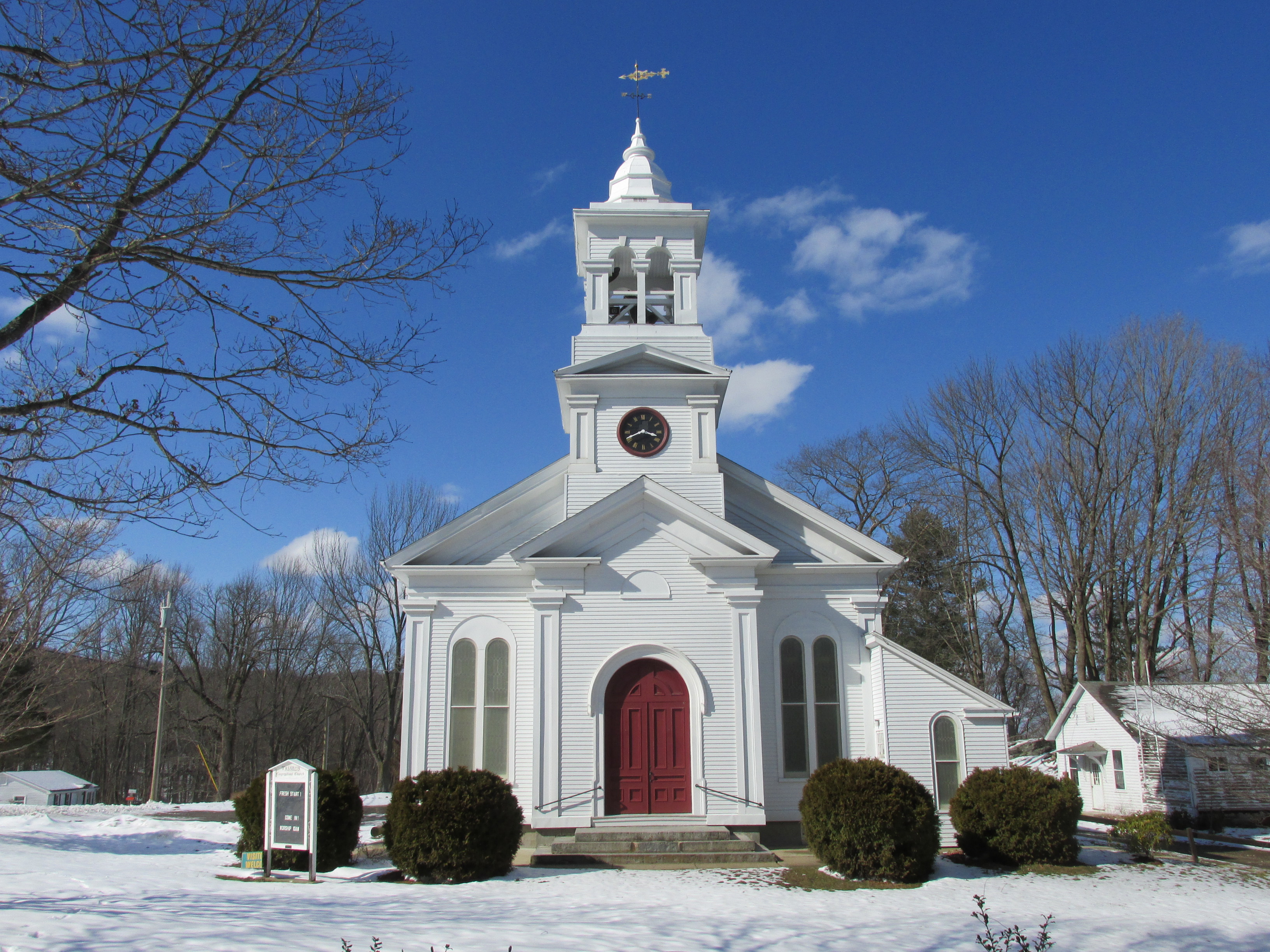
- Congregational Church

- Seal
- Interactive map of Town of Franklin
- Coordinates: 41°37′11″N 72°08′33″W
- Country: United States
- U.S. state: Connecticut
- County: New London
- Region: Southeastern CT
- Incorporated: 1786

Government
  - Type: Selectman-town meeting
  - First selectman: Judi Novosad

Area
  - Total: 19.6 sq mi (50.8 km^{2})
  - Land: 19.5 sq mi (50.5 km^{2})
  - Water: 0.077 sq mi (0.2 km^{2})
- Elevation: 315 ft (96 m)

Population (2020)
  - Total: 1,863
  - Density: 95.5/sq mi (36.9/km^{2})
- Time zone: UTC-5 (Eastern)
  - Summer (DST): UTC-4 (Eastern)
- ZIP Code: 06254
- Area codes: 860/959
- FIPS code: 09-29910
- GNIS feature ID: 0213431
- Website: www.franklinct.com

Franklin is a town in New London County, Connecticut, United States. The town is part of the Southeastern Connecticut Planning Region. The population was 1,863 at the 2020 census. The town includes the village of North Franklin.

== History ==
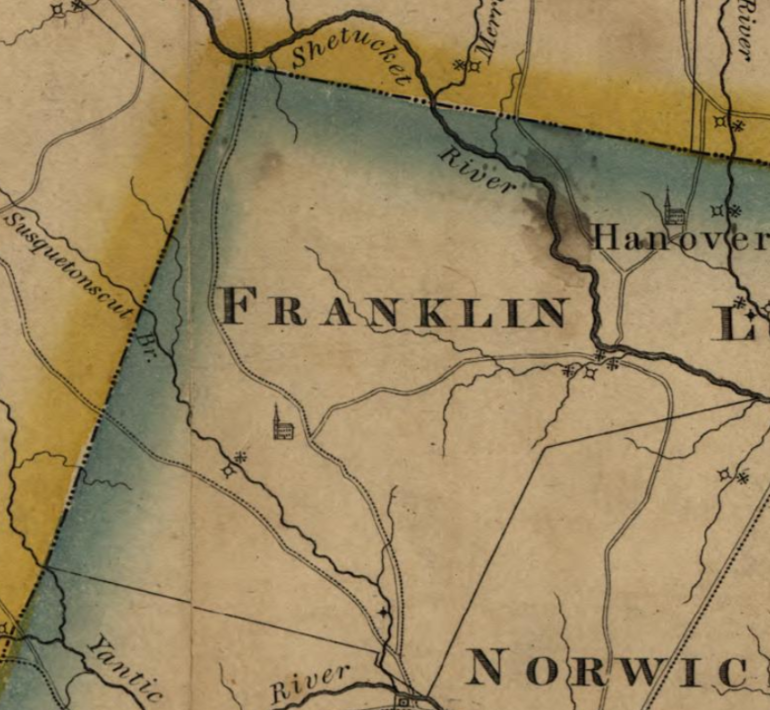
Map of Franklin's pre-1861 borders

Europeans first settled in what would become Franklin in 1663 as part of the larger division of the town of Norwich. The residents of what would become Franklin first petitioned for an ecclesiastical society in 1710, but were denied. Six years later, their petition was granted and they formed the second ecclesiastical society of Norwich, also called the West Farms.

During the First Great Awakening the society was shaken by controversy, partly over the location of the meetinghouse, but mostly fueled by conflict between the Old and New Lights in the society. The minister, Henry Willes, retired in 1749 as a result. In 1758, permission was granted to the eastern portion of the society to be formed as the Eighth, or Pautipaug, society of Norwich. The boundaries between the two societies would not be set until 1761.

The West Farms and Pautipaug societies were incorporated together as the Town of Franklin in 1786. The town is named after Benjamin Franklin.

Until 1861 the town's borders extended east to the Shetucket River and included the early village of Baltic. That year, the town of Sprague, was incorporated from the towns of Franklin and Lisbon, which gave Franklin its present boundaries.

== Geography ==
According to the United States Census Bureau, the town has a total area of 19.6 square miles (51 km^{2}), of which 19.5 square miles (51 km^{2}) is land and 0.1 square miles (0.26 km^{2}), or 0.36%, is water.

== Demographics ==
Historical population
Census	Pop.	Note	%±
1790	1,192		—
1800	1,210		1.5%
1810	1,161		−4.0%
1820	1,161		0.0%
1830	1,196		3.0%
1840	1,000		−16.4%
1850	895		−10.5%
1860	2,358		163.5%
1870	731		−69.0%
1880	686		−6.2%
1890	585		−14.7%
1900	546		−6.7%
1910	527		−3.5%
1920	552		4.7%
1930	611		10.7%
1940	667		9.2%
1950	727		9.0%
1960	974		34.0%
1970	1,356		39.2%
1980	1,592		17.4%
1990	1,810		13.7%
2000	1,835		1.4%
2010	1,922		4.7%
2020	1,863		−3.1%
U.S. Decennial Census

At the 2020 census there were 1,863 people, 702 households, and 511 families living in the town. The population density was 93.47 inhabitants per square mile (36.09/km^{2}). There were 729 housing units at an average density of 37.19 per square mile (14.36/km^{2}). The racial makeup of the town was 85.9% White, 2.2% African American, 0.0% Native American, 0.3% Asian, 0.0% Pacific Islander, 1.8% from other races, and 9.8% from two or more races. Hispanic or Latino people of any race were 8.6%.

Of the 702 households 31.1% had children under the age of 18 living with them, 61.2% were married couples living together. 23.1% of households were the householder living alone and 12.3% of that demographic were aged 65 or older. The average household size was 2.59 and the average family size was 3.06.

The age distribution was 23.4% under the age of 18, 8.2% from 18 to 24, 18.9% from 25 to 44, 32.2% from 45 to 64, and 17.3% 65 or older. The median age was 44.6 years. For every 100 females, there were 103.6 males.

The median household income was $41,845 and the median family income was $91,875. The per capita income for the town was $25,477. About 3.7% of the population were below the poverty line.

Voter registration and party enrollment as of October 31, 2023
Party	Active voters	Inactive voters	Total voters	Percentage
Democratic	347	23	370	24.31%
Republican	436	27	463	30.42%
Unaffiliated	615	42	657	43.17%
Minor Parties	31	1	32	2.10%
Total	1,429	93	1,522	100%

Presidential election results
Year	Democratic	Republican	Third parties
2020	43.8% 553	53.4% 674	2.8% 34
2016	37.8% 413	56.1% 613	6.1% 67
2012	49.1% 519	48.9% 516	2.0% 20
2008	50.5% 538	47.3% 504	2.2% 22
2004	48.0% 513	50.5% 540	1.5% 15
2000	53.3% 534	41.9% 420	4.8% 48
1996	51.3% 493	34.0% 327	14.7% 141
1992	34.3% 386	35.6% 401	30.1% 339
1988	39.2% 396	59.1% 597	1.7% 16
1984	29.0% 302	70.1% 729	0.9% 8
1980	30.4% 272	59.3% 531	10.3% 92
1976	47.8% 380	51.9% 413	0.3% 2
1972	34.3% 252	65.2% 478	0.5% 3
1968	41.1% 249	51.9% 315	7.0% 42
1964	61.6% 328	38.4% 205	0.00% 0
1960	43.4% 239	56.6% 312	0.00% 0
1956	33.6% 165	66.4% 326	0.00% 0

== Emergency services ==
=== Police ===
Due to the size of Franklin, there is no police department. Instead, the town has a partnership with the Connecticut State Police (Troop K) to provide coverage in case of an emergency.

=== Fire department ===
Franklin's volunteer fire department is led by Chief David Wheeler. The all-volunteer department provides fire, rescue, and emergency services to the town.

== Notable locations ==
- Ashbel Woodward House, built in 1835 and added to the National Register of Historic Places in 1992

== Notable people ==
- Alexander G. Abell (1818–1890), consul to Hawaiʻi, writer, and Californian politician
- Azel Backus (1765–1816), preacher and first president of Hamilton College
- Lafayette S. Foster (1806–1880), United States senator and Connecticut Supreme Court judge
- Asa Hartshorne (d. 1794), signatory on the Treaty of Fort Harmar and Army Officer during the Northwest Indian War
- Jacob Kingsbury (1756–1837), Army officer during the American Revolutionary War, Northwest Indian War, and War of 1812
- Eleazer Lord (1788–1871), author, banker, educator, deacon of the First Protestant Dutch Church, and first president of the Erie Railroad
- Orsamus H. Marshall (1813–1884), former chancellor of University of Buffalo
- Samuel Nott Jr. (1788–1869), missionary to India
- John Tracy (1783–1864), lawyer, New York assemblyman, and lieutenant governor of New York
- Uriah Tracy (1755–1807), patriot, congressman, U.S. senator, and first person interred in the Congressional Cemetery
- Allen Tucker (1838–1903), Civil War soldier and Medal of Honor recipient
- William Woodbridge (1755–1836), died in Franklin while running a school for girls
- Ashbel Woodward (1804–1885), medical doctor, historian, and regimental surgeon of the 26th Connecticut Infantry Regiment during the American Civil War
