= Colchester (CDP), Connecticut =

Census-designated place in Connecticut, United States

Colchester, Connecticut
- Census-designated place
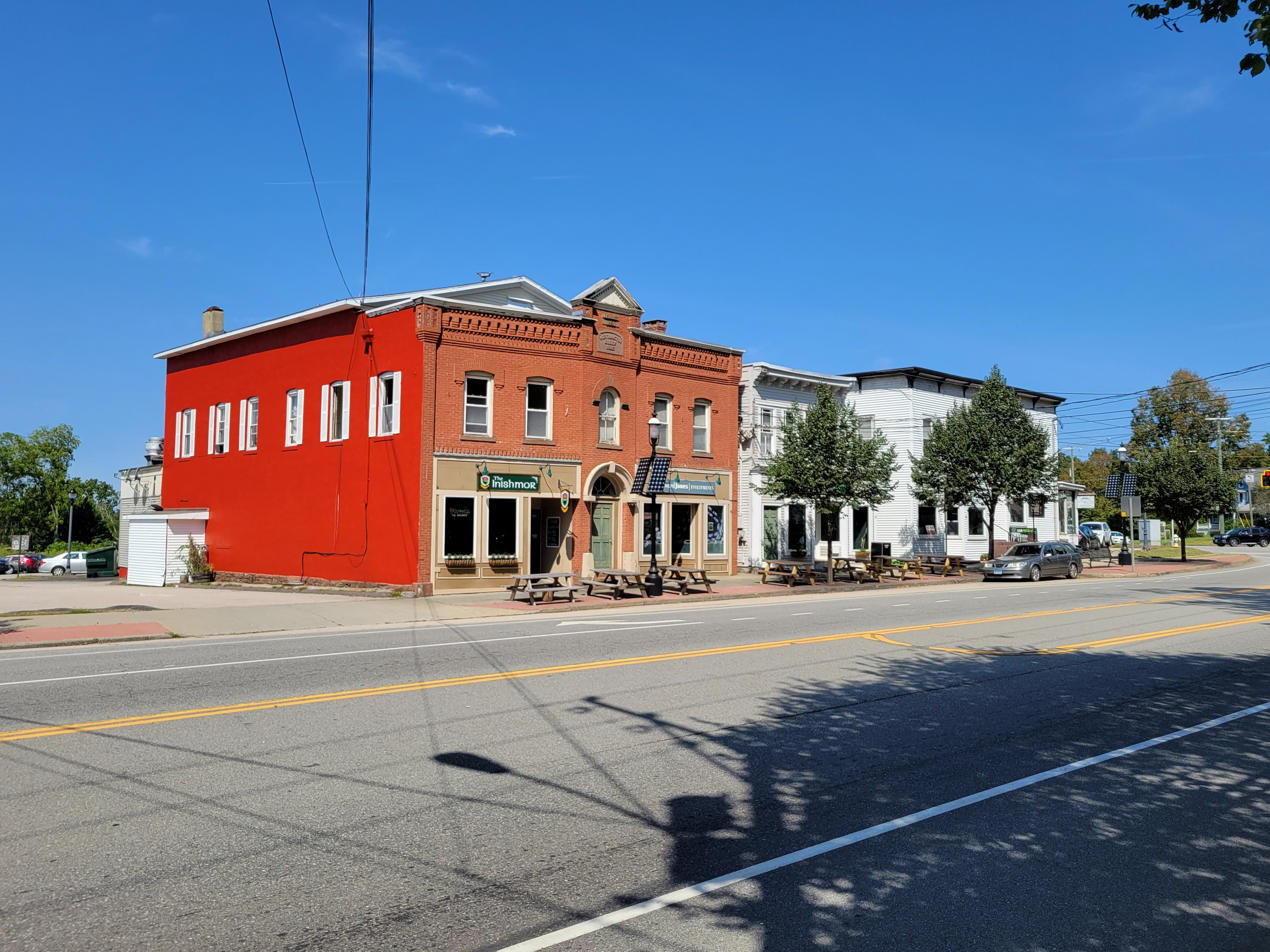
- Main Street

- Location within Connecticut Location within the United States
- Coordinates: 41°34′34″N 72°19′57″W
- Country: United States
- State: Connecticut
- County: New London
- Town: Colchester

Area
  - Total: 4.47 sq mi (11.58 km^{2})
  - Land: 4.47 sq mi (11.58 km^{2})
  - Water: 0 sq mi (0.0 km^{2})
- Elevation: 463 ft (141 m)

Population (2010)
  - Total: 4,781
  - Density: 1,070/sq mi (413/km^{2})
- Time zone: UTC-5 (Eastern (EST))
  - Summer (DST): UTC-4 (EDT)
- ZIP Code: 06415
- Area codes: 860/959
- FIPS code: 09-15840
- GNIS feature ID: 2378348

Colchester is a census-designated place (CDP) comprising the primary village and adjacent residential land in the town of Colchester, New London County, Connecticut, United States. It is in the east-central part of the town, with the Connecticut Route 2 expressway running through the south side of the community. As of the 2010 census, the CDP had a population of 4,781, out of 16,068 in the entire town of Colchester.

75 acres (30 ha) at the center of the village comprise the Colchester Village Historic District, listed on the National Register of Historic Places in 1994.

== Education ==
The census-designated place, along with the rest of Colchester Town, is in Colchester School District.
