= Joseph Judson =

Co-founder the town of Woodbury, Connecticut

Lieut. Joseph Judson

Deputy in the Connecticut General Court (now the General Assembly)
- In office 13 half-year terms between 1659 and 1667
- Constituency: Town of Stratford
- In office 5 half-year terms between 1684 and 1686
- Constituency: Town of Woodbury

Personal details
- Born: c. 1619 Kirkbymoorside, Yorkshire, England
- Died: October 8, 1690 Stratford, Connecticut
- Resting place: Old Congregational Burying Ground, Stratford, Connecticut
- Spouse: Sarah Porter
- Children: 11
- Parents: William Judson (father); Grace (unknown surname) (mother)
- Occupation: Farm owner, politician
- Known for: Co-founder of Woodbury, Connecticut
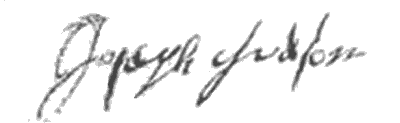
- Signature
- Military service
- Force: Connecticut militias
- Rank: Lieutenant
- Units: Stratford Trainband, Woodbury Trainband, Fairfield county militia
- Conflict: King Philip's War (1675-1678)

Lieut. Joseph Judson (c. 1619 – October 8, 1690) was an early New England colonist best known for co-founding the town of Woodbury, Connecticut.

The Judson family, including the teen-aged Joseph Judson, settled in Concord, Massachusetts Bay Colony, in about 1634. Five years later they were among the first settlers in Stratford, Connecticut Colony. He left Stratford to help establish the town of Woodbury in 1672 after religious disagreements with the Puritan church.

Judson was elected to represent Stratford and Woodbury in the Connecticut legislature. He held the rank of lieutenant in both towns' militias and served in the Fairfield county militia during King Philip's War.

== Early life ==
Joseph Judson was born c. 1619 in Kirkbymoorside, Yorkshire, to William Judson (c. 1592-1662) and Grace (d. 1659). In 1634, at the age of 15, Joseph Judson emigrated with his parents and two younger brothers, Jeremiah and Joshua, from England to the Massachusetts Bay Colony. The Judsons resided in Concord before moving to the Connecticut Colony about five years later.

== Stratford, Connecticut ==
=== Settlement ===
The Judsons were among the first group of settlers at Stratford, Connecticut Colony, in 1639. The plantation was initially called Pequannock, then Cupheag in 1640, and finally Stratford in 1643.

Soon after arriving in Pequannock, Joseph's father erected the plantation's first house. About 20 years later, Joseph Judson took ownership of the home after his father left Stratford for New Haven. By 1658, Joseph Judson owned a farm at Mischa Hill which lies four miles north of Stratford in the present Nichols Farms Historic District of Trumbull, Connecticut.

=== Public service ===
Judson was admitted as a freeman of Stratford in 1658.

As Stratford grew, Judson was empowered to purchase more land from Native Americans on the town's behalf. In 1661, he negotiated with leaders of the Paugussett people for a large tract of land north of Stratford known as the Mohegan Hills Purchase. In 1662, he negotiated a deed with the Paugussetts for a tract lying west of Stratford known as the Long Hill Purchase.

Judson was elected deputy (town representative) to the Connecticut General Court—the precursor to the state legislature—for 13 half-year terms between 1659 and 1667. (Note: Judson was elected to represent Stratford in the General Court in October 1658, May 1659, October 1659, October 1661, May 1662, October 1662, May 1663, October 1663, May 1664, May 1665, May 1666, October 1666, and May 1667.) He was an ensign in the Stratford militia by 1663 and promoted to the rank of lieutenant in the First Company of the Stratford Trainband when it was formed in 1672.

=== Religious dissent ===
A religious conflict erupted between Stratford's conservative Puritans and its more liberal residents. Most people in town were followers of Adam Blakeman (1596–1665), a town co-founder and the Puritan minister at the First Church of Stratford. The Puritan church required a personal conversion experience for full church membership and only children of full members could be baptized. A minority, including Joseph Judson, opposed the Puritan restrictions on membership and baptism. Judson engaged in a protracted, public debate about church matters with fellow Stratford settler Joseph Hawley and others in letters, at town meetings, and in petitions to the General Court.

In 1669, the General Court endorsed the Half-Way Covenant, which relaxed the restrictions on baptism. Despite the compromise, the dissidents in Stratford founded their own church in 1670 under the leadership of Reverend Zachariah Walker, a former Presbyterian minister. This new congregation, called the Second Church of Stratford, shared the First Church's meetinghouse, but a dispute ensued about the arrangement.

== Woodbury, Connecticut ==
=== Settlement ===
The friction between Stratford's First and Second Churches prompted the Connecticut General Court in 1672 to grant permission to Joseph Judson and three others to establish a new plantation about 50 miles north of Stratford at Pomperaug.

This Court grants Mr. Sam^{ll} Sherman, L^{nt} Wm. Curtice, Ens: Joseph Judson and John Minor themselues and associates liberty to errect a plantation at Pomperoage, prouided it doth not prejudice any former grant to any other plantation or perticuler person; prouided any other honest inhabitants of Stratford haue liberty to joyne with them in setleing there, and that they entertein so many inhabitants as the place will conueniently interteine, and that they setle there within the space of three yeares.

Preamble

We the committee appointed by y^{e} Honored General Court for y^{e} erecting a plantation at Pomparague in y^{e} behalf of ourselves & our Society being met together y^{e} 14th of feb^{r} 1672 and having been serious & deliberate in y^{e} consideration of y^{e} benefit of y^{e} s^{d} place, and y^{e} prosperity of y^{e} same have consented & Agreed to y^{e} following perticulers....

— Fundamental Articles

Judson and other town founders created a settlers' agreement in 1672 titled the "Fundamental Articles agreed upon in order to y^{e} settlement of a plantation at Pomparague." (Note: "Ye" and "y^{e}" represent an Early Modern English form of the definite article "the.") The Fundamental Articles, ratified in 1673 by 17 original settlers, contained six sections and six amendments. The document specified obligations regarding distribution and sale of home lots and meadows, town debt, accommodations for ministers, land for a school, and the requirement that each must submit themselves to "Ecclesiastical Gouerment."

Three founders—Joseph Judson, Samuel Sherman, and John Minor—bought the town's initial tract of land in 1673 from leaders of the Potatuck tribe of the Paugussett people. This deed was called the "First Purchase."

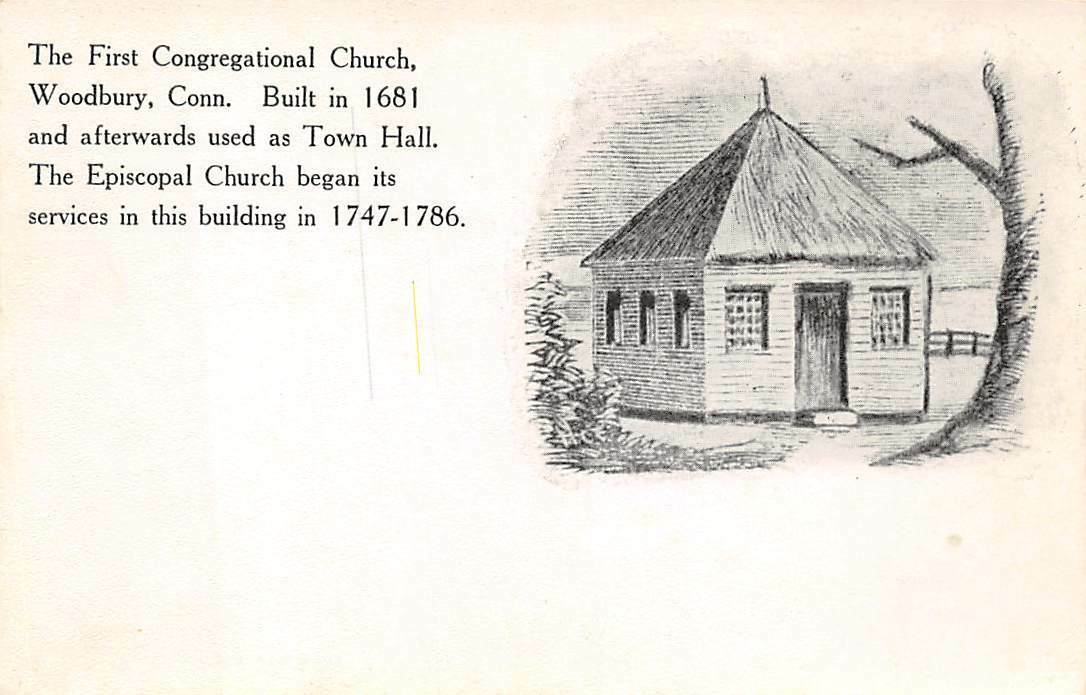
First Church of Woodbury, built 1681

The First Church of Woodbury was established in 1673 with Reverend Zachariah Walker as minister, who initially split his time between the First Church of Woodbury and the Second Church of Stratford. The First Church of Woodbury's meeting house was built in 1681.

Pomperaug plantation was officially named Woodbury in 1674 and the General Court approved the town's royal patent in 1686. The early town, which included the First Purchase and three subsequent purchases, is today called Ancient Woodbury. It now comprises the smaller Connecticut towns of Woodbury, Roxbury, Southbury, Bethlehem, and parts of Middlebury, Oxford, and Washington.

=== Public service ===
The first deputies representing Woodbury in the colony's legislature were Joseph Judson and John Minor, who were elected in May 1684. Judson served five more half-year terms between 1684 and 1686. (Note: Judson was elected to represent Woodbury in the General Court in May and October 1684, May and October 1685, and May and October 1686.) He was a colonial commissioner (judge) for five terms between 1684 and 1689. (Note: Judson was made a colonial commissioner in 1684, 1685, 1686, 1687, and 1689.)

He was appointed to committees to help set town boundaries. He surveyed the lands of Derby, Woodbury, Mattatuck, Pootatuck and Wyantenock in 1675 and the lands between Milford and Derby in 1678. He was on a committee in 1680 that set the boundaries of Woodbury, Derby and Mattatuck.

In 1676, during King Philip's War (1675–1678), Judson was selected for a conditional promotion to captain of the Fairfield County Troop "if Capt. Selleck be disenabled." He was made a lieutenant in the Woodbury Trainband in 1684.

== Family ==
Joseph Judson married Sarah Porter (1624–1696) on October 24, 1644, in Windsor, Connecticut Colony. She was the daughter of John Porter and Rosanna White. They had eleven children: Sarah, b. 1645; John, b. 1647, James, b. 1650; Grace, b. 1651; Joseph, b. 1654; Hannah, b. 1657; Esther, b. 1660; Joshua (twin), b. 1664; Ruth (twin), b. 1664; Phoebe, b. 1666; and Abigail, b. 1669.

== Death and legacy ==
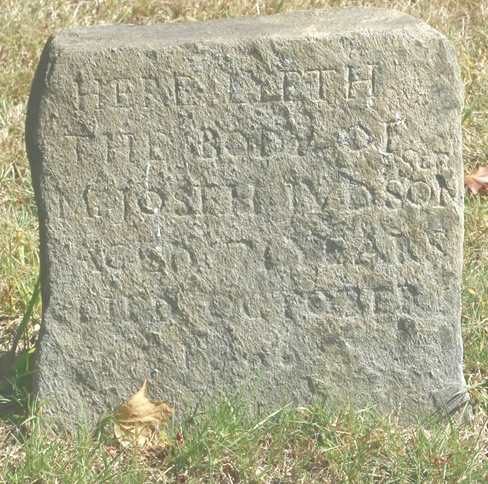
Joseph Judson gravestone

Judson died on October 8, 1690, and his wife Sarah died on March 16, 1696, at Woodbury. They are buried in the Stratford Congregational Burying Ground. An additional cemetery monument for Sarah and Joseph Judson was erected in 1812.

The site of his family home in Stratford is on the National Register of Historic Places. The original house, built of stone in about 1639 by his father William, was replaced on the same foundation with a wood-framed house in 1723 by his grandson, David Judson. The Captain David Judson House now serves as a museum in the Stratford Center Historic District.

Judson Avenue (previously Judson Lane) in Woodbury memorializes Joseph Judson.
