= Thomas Hawley House =

Historic house in Connecticut, United States

- U.S. National Register of Historic Places
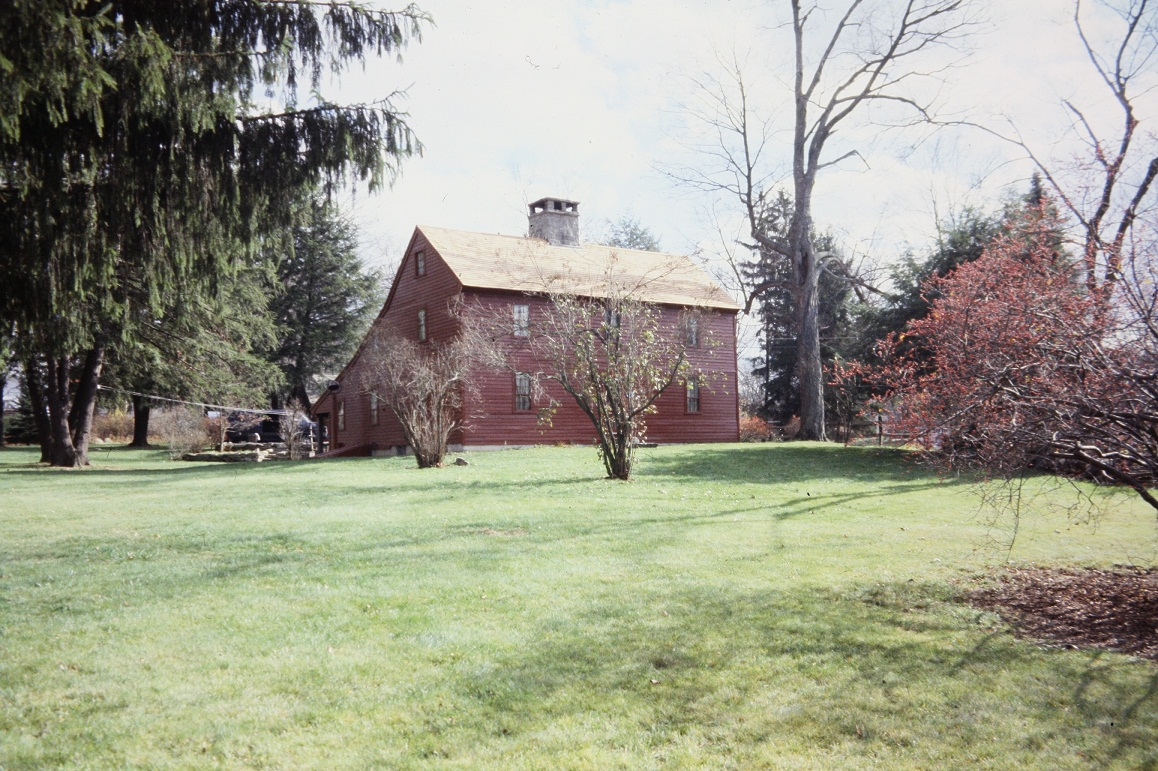
- Thomas Hawley House

- Location within Connecticut Location within the United States
- Location: 514 Purdy Hill Road, Monroe, Connecticut
- Coordinates: 41°18′20″N 73°15′10″W
- Built: 1730
- Architectural style: Saltbox Colonial
- NRHP reference No.: 80004059
- Added to NRHP: April 11, 1980

The Thomas Hawley House at 514 Purdy Hill Road in Monroe, Connecticut, is a historic Colonial American wooden post-and-beam saltbox farm house built in 1730. Hawley was the great grandson of Joseph Hawley (Captain) of Stratford, Connecticut, through Samuel. A drawing and description of the house was included in J. Frederick Kelly's book, The Early Domestic Architecture of Connecticut first published in 1924.

== Thomas and Sarah Hawley ==
The Thomas Hawley house is a rare survivor from the earliest era of Stepney's settlement. It is also a reminder that until the mid-20th century, most residents made their living by farming. Present day Stepney or Monroe, was originally the northern part of Stratford, which had been settled in 1639. In the early 18th century, descendants of Stratford's original settlers, Thomas Hawley among them, carved out farms out of the wilderness. Thomas Hawley was the great grandson of Joseph Hawley, one of the original settlers of Stratford, Connecticut, who purchased most of the present town of Monroe from the Paugusset Indians in 1671. Thomas was born on September 8, 1734, in present-day Trumbull, Connecticut, married Sarah Olcott on November 16, 1760, and raised ten children.

== New Stratford ==
In 1761, 48 men from North Stratford, including Thomas Hawley, submitted a petition to the Connecticut General Court for permission to form their own religious parish. The nearest meetinghouse, as Congregationalists called their house of worship, was more than three miles (5 km) away. This made it difficult for residents of North Stratford to comply with the Connecticut law requiring everyone to attend all-day worship services on the Sabbath. The Connecticut General Court granted their request, and in 1762 created the New Stratford Ecclesiastical Society. In 1823, this society incorporated as the Town of Monroe.

== Building ==
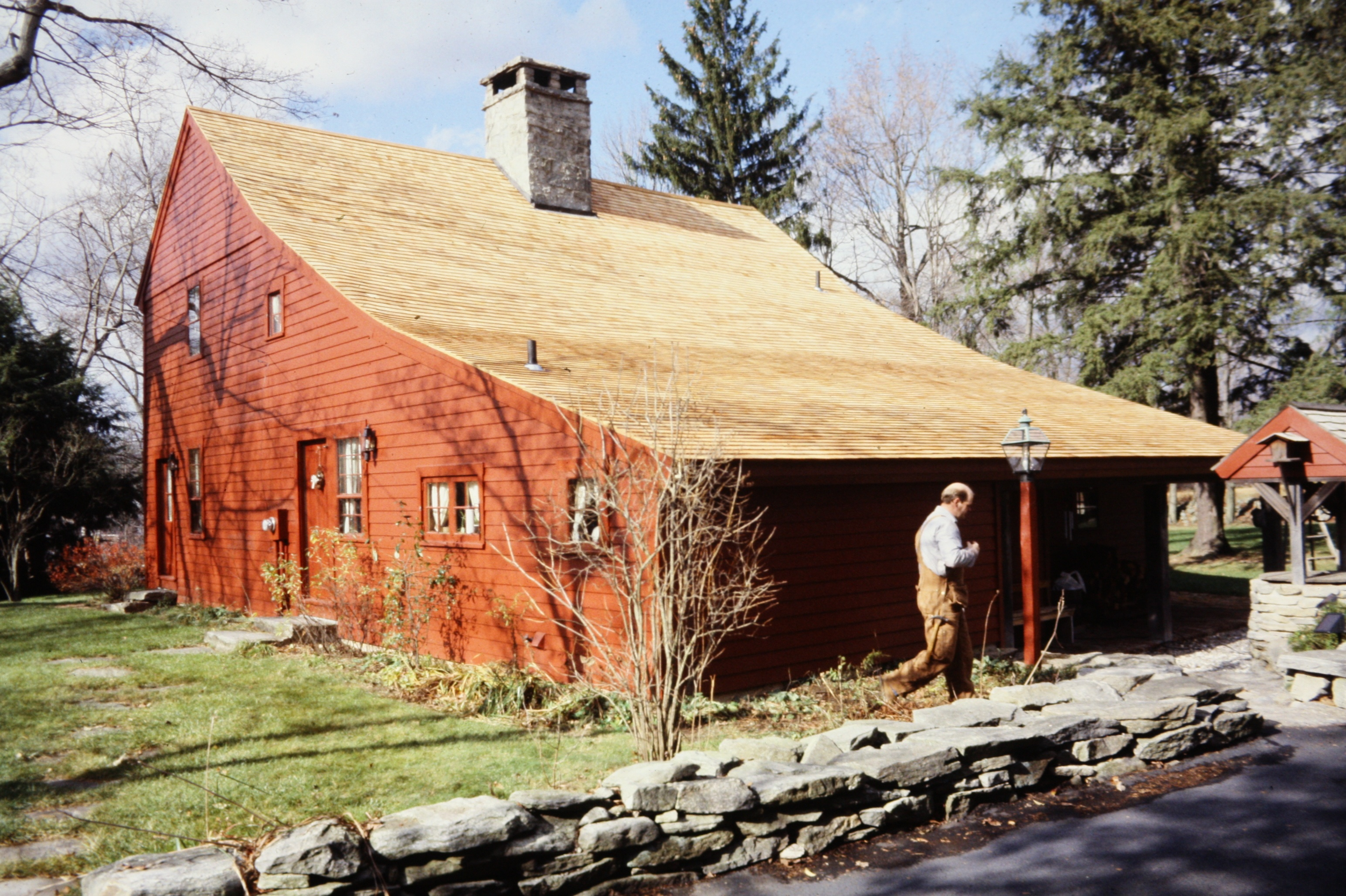
Rear view

The house, a pre-revolutionary saltbox dwelling, is two and one-half stories high and three bays wide with a side gable roof; center entrance, and center fieldstone chimney. Its dimensions are approximately 37 by 40 feet (12 m). The roof pitch is 45 degrees in the main portion, lessening to 30 degrees in the kitchen appendage, a probable indication that this was added at later date. The exterior is clapboard, painted a dark red color. The roof is a natural wood shingle. Window sash is 9-over-6 on the first floor and 6-over-6 on the second, and 9-panel single hung in the attic. None of the early farm outbuildings survive. There are no surface remnants of a barn and slave house mentioned in an early 19th-century estate inventory.

== Revolutionary War ==
Captain Thomas Hawley played a role on the home front in the war for American independence. He is believed to have served on the Committee of Inspection appointed in 1776 to “keep watch and ward” in Stratford, of which Monroe was then still part, and which bordered the vulnerable Long Island coast.

== Later years ==
Records show that as late as 1800, two enslaved people lived on the property. Slavery had existed in Connecticut since the 17th century. By 1800 the vast majority of the state's black residents were freed. They had been manumitted (or freed) by their owners, bought their own freedom, or been liberated by a law designed to gradually eliminate slavery in Connecticut. By 1810 Thomas Hawley no longer owned slaves. Thomas Hawley died in 1817 at the age of 83, leaving nearly 150 acres (0.61 km^{2}) of land. An inventory of Thomas Hawley's estate at the time of his death shows a house valued at $160.00, a slave house at $10.00, and a barn at $130.00. David Hawley was the beneficiary of his father's estate. His descendants lived in his house for another century. In the 1920s, F. William Behrens, mayor of Bridgeport from 1923 to 1929, purchased the Thomas Hawley house as a summer home.

== See also ==
- National Register of Historic Places listings in Fairfield County, Connecticut
- Ephraim Hawley House
