= William Beardsley (settler) =

Settler of Connecticut (c. 1605–1661)

William Beardsley (c. 1605–1661) was one of the first settlers of Stratford, Connecticut (abt. 1635).

== Biography ==
According to long-standing family tradition, William Beardsley was born in about 1605 in Stratford-upon-Avon, Warwickshire; England, but documentation to support this tradition is lacking. Orcutt in his History of Stratford and other authorities state that he emigrated with Rev. Adam Blakeman from St. Albans, Hertfordshire, England. Isaac Haight Beardsley conducted research on the English origins of the Beardsley line in 1891, and he reported after a thorough search of the extant records that no evidence to support the Stratford-on-Avon origins could be found. Isaac H. Beardsley did, however, locate information in the Abbey records of St. Albans and concluded that William Beardsley (born 1605) and Thomas Beardsley (born 1603, another early settler of Stratford, Connecticut) were possibly sons of Hugh Bearsley, who appears in the baptismal records of St. Albans on 31 Oct 1582 and grandsons of Thomas Bearsley and Jane Upton, who were married at St. Albans on 16 Jul 1581. This evidence has evidently not been convincing to some family historians, since the traditional Stratford-on-Avon origins were again reported in a work by Nellie Beardsley Holt in 1951. Holt also reported that in 1631, William Beardsley married Mary Harvie in St. Mary's church, and in 1633, their first son John was baptized there. More research into primary sources is still needed to resolve the differing accounts.

Modern discoveries, supported by LDS Church genealogical researchers, show that William Beardsley was originally from Ilkeston, Derbyshire. Many persons of the Beardsley surname live in that area today.

In 1635, Beardsley and his wife and three children boarded the ship "Planter" with 116 other passengers and sailed to Massachusetts. In December 1636, Beardsley took the oath of a freeman of Massachusetts.

In 1639, Beardsley and his wife left Boston to become one of the first settler families in the Pequonnocke Plantation, which later became known as Stratford, Connecticut. Beardsley was active in the affairs of the settlement and served as Deputy to the General Court at Hartford from 1645 to 1659, Judge, as well as being one of the founders of the First Congregational Church of Stratford, Connecticut.

After arriving in America, from 1636-1646 Beardsley and his wife had six additional children.

Beardsley died in Stratford, Connecticut in 1661 and is buried in Union Cemetery with his wife.
