= Stratford Downtown, Connecticut =

Census-designated place in Connecticut, United States

- Census-designated place
- Location within Connecticut Location within the United States
- Coordinates: 41°11′56″N 73°7′53″W
- Country: United States
- State: Connecticut
- County: Fairfield
- Town: Stratford

Area
  - Total: 0.63 sq mi (1.62 km^{2})
  - Land: 0.63 sq mi (1.62 km^{2})
  - Water: 0 sq mi (0.0 km^{2})
- Elevation: 42 ft (13 m)
- Time zone: UTC-5 (Eastern (EST))
  - Summer (DST): UTC-4 (EDT)
- ZIP Codes: 06614, 06615
- Area codes: 203/475
- FIPS code: 09-74303
- GNIS feature ID: 2805059

Stratford Downtown is a census-designated place (CDP) corresponding to the town center of Stratford, Connecticut, United States. Route 1 (Barnum Avenue) runs east–west through the center of the CDP, and Interstate 95 forms the southeastern border, with access from Exit 32B (West Broad Street) at the southern limit of the CDP and from Exit 33 (Route 1 and Route 130) at the eastern limit. The Stratford Center Historic District falls outside the CDP, just to the south.

As of the 2020 census, Stratford Downtown had a population of 1,473.

Stratford Downtown was first listed as a CDP prior to the 2020 census.

== Demographics ==
=== 2020 census ===
As of the 2020 census, Stratford Downtown had a population of 1,473. The median age was 41.2 years. 22.1% of residents were under the age of 18 and 15.3% of residents were 65 years of age or older. For every 100 females there were 77.7 males, and for every 100 females age 18 and over there were 72.7 males age 18 and over.

100.0% of residents lived in urban areas, while 0.0% lived in rural areas.

There were 649 households in Stratford Downtown, of which 27.7% had children under the age of 18 living in them. Of all households, 32.5% were married-couple households, 27.4% were households with a male householder and no spouse or partner present, and 29.6% were households with a female householder and no spouse or partner present. About 37.1% of all households were made up of individuals and 16.2% had someone living alone who was 65 years of age or older.

There were 673 housing units, of which 3.6% were vacant. The homeowner vacancy rate was 0.0% and the rental vacancy rate was 7.0%.

Racial composition as of the 2020 census
Race	Number	Percent
White	850	57.7%
Black or African American	232	15.8%
American Indian and Alaska Native	5	0.3%
Asian	45	3.1%
Native Hawaiian and Other Pacific Islander	1	0.1%
Some other race	171	11.6%
Two or more races	169	11.5%
Hispanic or Latino (of any race)	328	22.3%
