= Truman Bradley =

Truman Bradley may refer to:

- Truman Bradley (Native American) (c.1826–1900), Schaghticoke Native American who lived in the village of Nichols Farms in Trumbull, Connecticut
- Truman Bradley (actor) (1905–1974), American actor and narrator in radio, television and film
