= Joseph Hawley (captain) =

Town clerk of Stratford, Connecticut

Joseph Hawley (c. 1603–20 May 1690), was born in Parwich, Derbyshire, England, was the first of the Hawley name to come to America in 1629/30. He settled at Stratford, Connecticut, by 1650, becoming the town's first town clerk or record keeper, tavern (ordinary) keeper and a shipbuilder.

== Surname ==
Coat of Arms of Joseph Hawley

The surname of Hawley is one of locality origin, meaning; the one who dwells by the hedged meadow. The Hawley family is of ancient and noble descent, a Lord Hawley being a peer in the reign of King Charles I of England, and members of this family were long seated in the counties of Dorset, Somerset and Derby in England.

The Hawleys were very prominent in the early history of the Colony of Connecticut covering a period of eighty years, members of the family had been seventy times elected to the assembly. They were among the wealthy families of Connecticut and a familiar phrase among the people of Bridgeport, Connecticut, used to be: as rich as the Hawleys.

== Biography ==
The Hawley Record of 1890 states that Joseph arrived in Boston, Massachusetts, around 1629 or 1630. His brother, Thomas, settled in Roxbury where he had received a land grant in 1639. Hawley married Katharine Birdsey in 1640 and raised eight children in Stratford; Samuel, Joseph Jr., Elizabeth, Ebenezer, Hannah, Ephraim, John and Mary. His daughter Mary married John Coe, the grandson of Robert Coe, who had founded Stamford and several other towns in the colonies. As time passed he became a large landowner and in 1671, stood to be the second highest on the tax list of Stratford. A modest estimate of his holdings would be that he owned 4–5,000 acres. He owned much land in what is now the central business section of Bridgeport.

=== Public service ===
Hawley was one of the original proprietors of Stratford being listed second after Captain William Curtiss in the town patent of 1683. He became the town's first clerk in 1650, and served in that capacity until 1666. He used a peculiar handwriting style that used French capital letters and an abbreviated combination of small letters. This style was exactly like used in all public documents found in the state books of London, England at the time. He was well educated and may have worked for the state department in England prior to coming to America. He was first elected as Deputy on 20 May 1658, by the General Court of the Colony of Connecticut at Hartford under then Governor Thomas Welles. He also served as treasurer, justice of the peace and was elected ordinary, or tavern keeper, on 29 December 1675. He represented Stratford as a deputy, or representative, in the legislature at the Connecticut Colony every year from 1658 to 1687. His name appears in the deed that purchased a vast amount of land from the Golden Hill Paugussett Indian Nation on 22 April 1662 which comprised most of the nearby towns of Trumbull, Monroe and Shelton.

=== Derby ===
Hawley's purchase of land from the Indians that comprises the present-day town of Derby, Connecticut, caused much controversy at the time. Hawley was later court ordered to transfer the land to the town of Derby. His entire family had to sign off on the transfer of land on 28 March 1690.

=== Ship building ===
According to the records of Stratford, Hawley became one of the first shipbuilders in Derby and Stratford. The records indicate that Hawley sold a one-eighth interest in his ship, the John and Esther, to John Rogers of New London, Connecticut, on 27 October 1678 for 58 pounds, one shilling and two pence In 1680, he sold another one-eight interest in the ship to John Prentice. The ship was used in the nearby Fairfield harbour at the time. The sale of the John and Esther in 1678, may be one of the earliest documented sales of a commercial ship built in Connecticut. Hawley became a large landowner or yeoman. It is believed by some that Hawley owned nearly 5,000 acres (20 km^{2}) of land in his lifetime.

=== Religious rift ===
Joseph Hawley and Lt. Joseph Judson had a lengthy argument over the introduction of the half way covenant that eventually had to be settled by Governor John Winthrop the Younger and the Connecticut Colony court in Hartford. They argued over the selection of a new minister and the direction of the church in Stratford which led to a major rift in the town. After the court's decision, many families left Stratford and followed Lt. Joseph Judson to Woodbury, Connecticut, to create their own settlement and church.

Joseph Hawley died on 20 May 1690 and is buried in Stratford. His will was probated in Fairfield County Probate Court in 1690.

== See also ==
- Ephraim Hawley House
- Thomas Hawley House
- David Hawley
- Robert Hawley

== Notes ==
- William Cothren, History of Ancient Woodbury Connecticut, Bronson Brothers, Waterbury, 1854
- Frederick Haines Curtiss, A Genealogy of the Curtiss Family, Rockwell and Churchill Press, Boston, 1903
- William Cutter, Genealogical and Family History of Western New York, Lewis Historical Publishing Co., 1912
- William Richard Cutter, New England Families, Genealogical and Memorial, Lewis Historical Publishing, NY, 1914
- Merrill Gates, Men of Mark in America, Men of Mark Publishing Co., Washington D.C., 1906
- Reverend Samuel Orcutt, A History of Stratford and the City of Bridgeport Connecticut, Fairfield Historical Society, 1886
- Reverend Samuel Orcutt, History of the Old Town of Derby, Connecticut 1642–1880, Springfield Printing Co., 1880
- Nancy O. Phillips, Town Records of Derby, Connecticut 1655–1710, Sarah Riggs Humphreys Chapter Daughters of the American Revolution, Derby, 1901
