= Captain David Judson House =

Historic house in Connecticut, United States

- Capt. David Judson House
- U.S. National Register of Historic Places
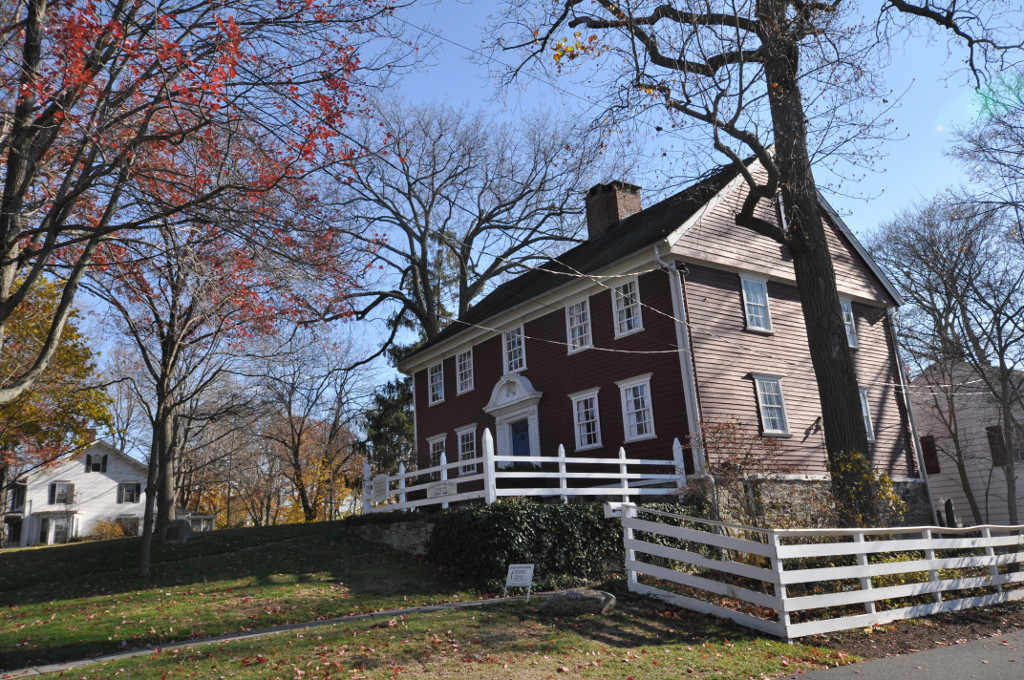

- Location within Connecticut Location within the United States
- Location: 967 Academy Hill, Stratford, Connecticut
- Coordinates: 41°11′15.94″N 73°7′47.04″W
- Built: 1723
- Architectural style: Georgian
- NRHP reference No.: 73001946
- Added to NRHP: March 20, 1973

The Captain David Judson House is a historic house at 967 Academy Hill in Stratford, Connecticut. It was built by David Judson in 1723. The new house was built on the stone foundation and incorporates the chimney of the original house built on the site in 1638 by Judson's great-grandfather William. William left the house to his son Joseph Judson in November 1660 when he removed to New Haven. Nine generations of Judsons lived in the house until 1888.

The first floor, now the cellar, is above ground level and contains a massive central stone chimney which was built with lug poles. It is believed that the cellar was used as slave quarters in the early 18th century. The new house, built in 1723, is designed in the style of Georgian architecture, or colonial Georgian, found throughout the American colonies during this time. The furnishings are entirely period pieces of Stratford origin, dating from the 18th century and includes a piano which belonged to William Samuel Johnson, framer of the United States Constitution, and also the second president of Columbia University. The piano has been on display at George Washington's plantation Mount Vernon. The house also has various other works of historical and artistic significance, displayed for the public. The Judson House broken scroll pediment entry is one of the finest in Connecticut. An architectural drawing was used on the cover of J. Frederick Kelly's Early Domestic Architecture of Connecticut published in 1924.

Captain David Judson House was listed on the National Register of Historic Places on March 20, 1973. It is also included in the Stratford Center Historic District, which was listed on the NRHP in 1978.

The house is open to the public and is operated as a historic house museum and research library by the Stratford Historical Society, and is located at 967 Academy Hill in Stratford.

== See also ==
- List of the oldest buildings in Connecticut
- National Register of Historic Places listings in Fairfield County, Connecticut
