= Robert Hawley =

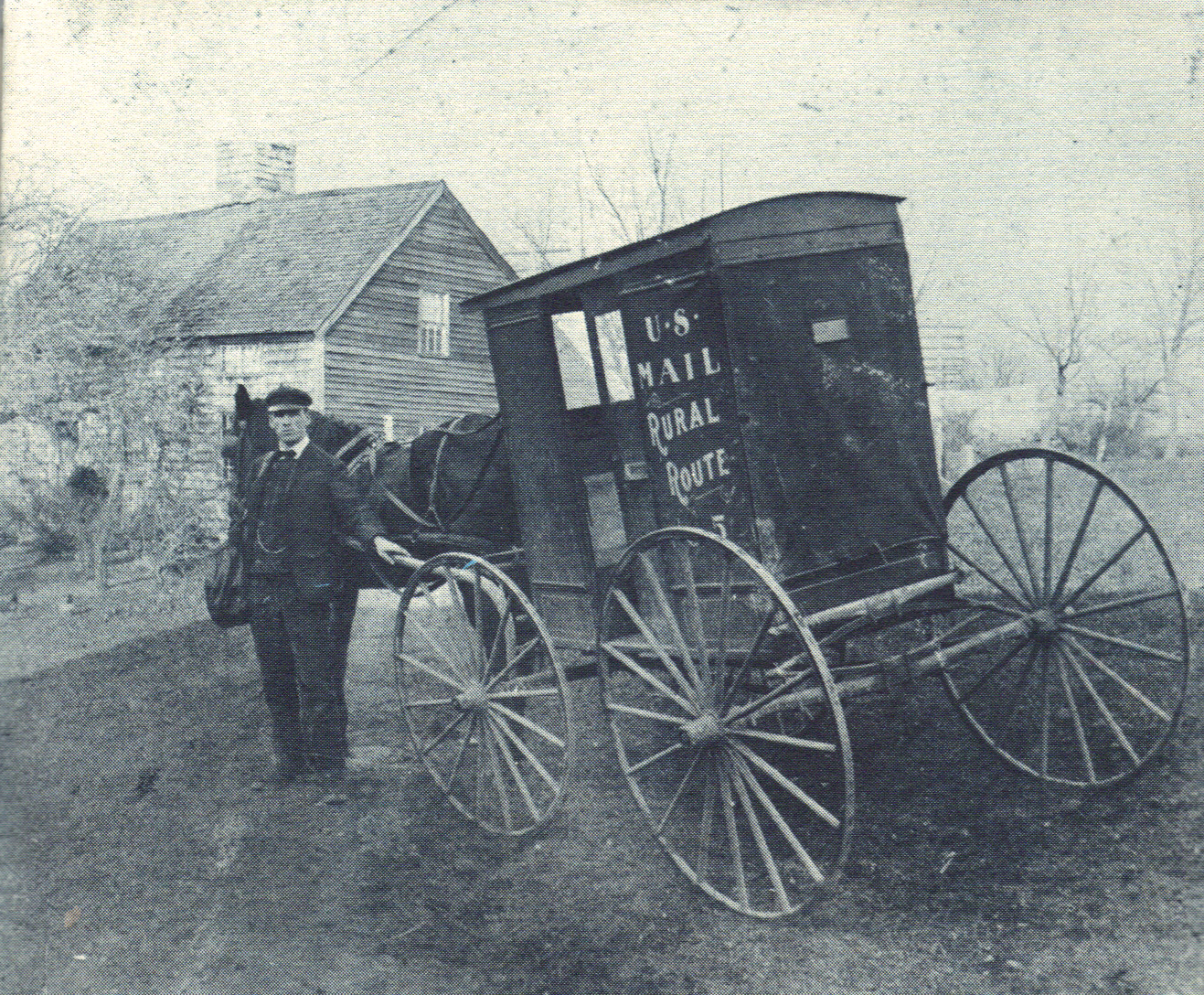
Robert Hawley gifted this house to his son Eliakim in 1787 image ca. 1880

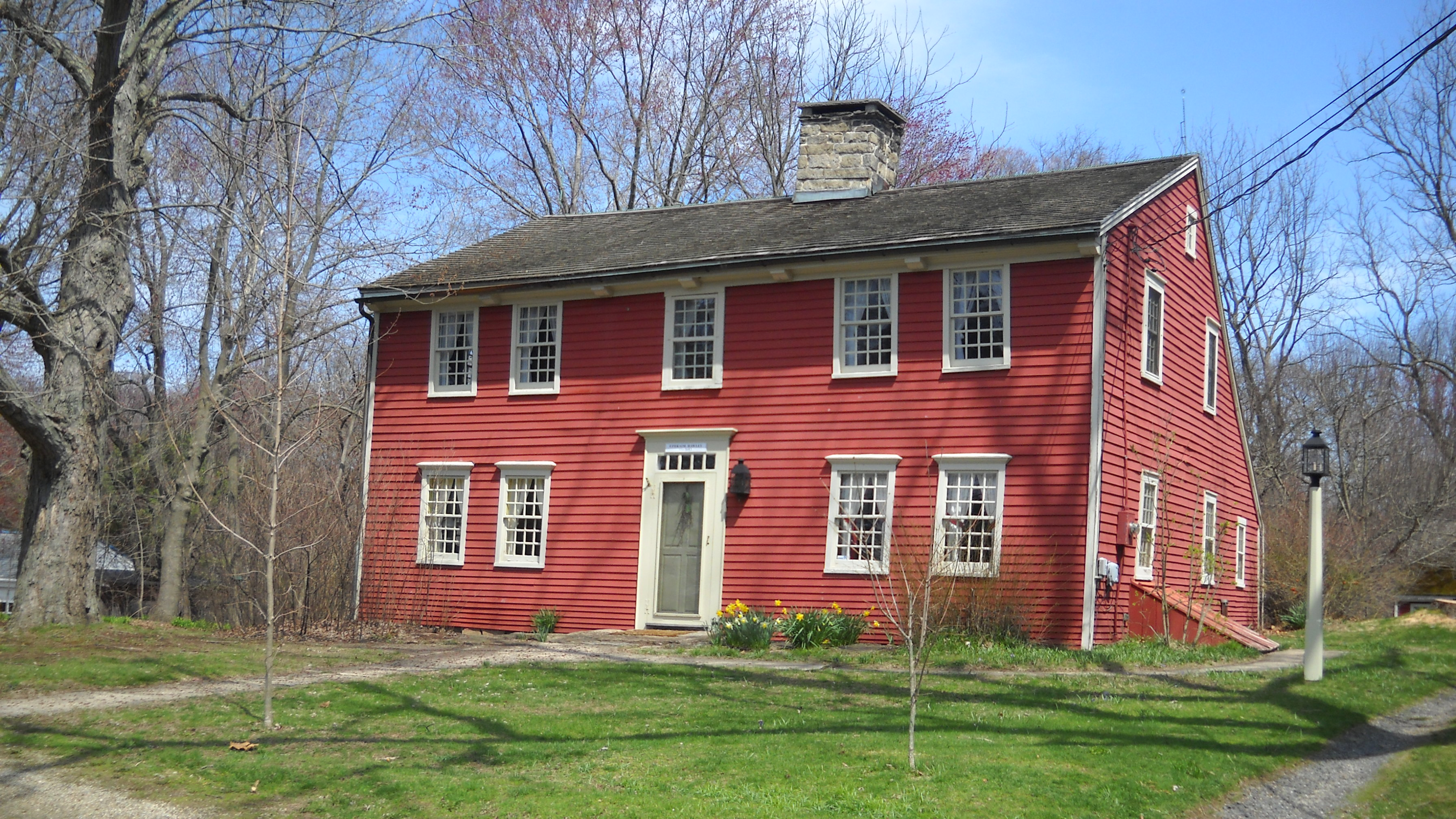
Image spring 2011

Robert Hawley (1729–1799), Captain, raised provisions for the Continental Army soldiers and fought in the American Revolutionary War.

== Biography ==
Captain Robert Hawley was born June 5, 1726, in North Stratford, now Trumbull, Connecticut, in New England. He was the son of John Hawley, Esquire and Sarah Walker, the grandson of Captain John Hawley and great grandson of Joseph Hawley (Captain), the first of the name in America. On March 15, 1750, Hawley married Anna Beach, daughter of Lt. Josiah Beach and Patience Nichols, and raised nine children. The family lived in the house built by Robert's great uncle Ephraim Hawley on Nichols Avenue Route 108 at the south end of the village of Nichols Farms on land that had been in the Hawley family since 1670. Hawley gifted the house to his son Eliakim in January 1787 when he married his cousin Sally Sara Hawley. Captain Robert Hawley died in 1799.

== Lawsuit ==
Robert and Anna Hawley, and some 35 others, signed a petition to the county court held in Fairfield, Connecticut, by adjournment, the fourth Tuesday of January 1772, against Jonathan Nichols of Stratford, for the seizure and possession of about 47 acres (190,000 m^{2}) of land in the Parish of North Stratford, which was tried by the Superior Court in 1773 and judgment rendered for plaintiffs.

== Military service ==
The Connecticut general assembly named Robert Hawley the Ensign of the North Stratford Train Band or Company of the 4th regiment of the Connecticut Colony militia in October 1765. He was promoted to Lieutenant in October 1769 and to Captain in May 1773. At a special meeting assembled in North Stratford on November 10, 1777 he was appointed to a committee to provide immediately all those necessaries for the Continental Army soldiers. On March 12, 1778, the parish of North Stratford made donations of provisions for those residents serving in the southern army stationed at Valley Forge, Pennsylvania under the command of General George Washington. George Washington called Connecticut the Provision State because of supplies contributed to his army by Governor Jonathan Trumbull the only Colonial Governor to support the cause of America's Independence from Great Britain. Three Hawley's from North Stratford served in the southern army during the winter of 1778; Abraham, Nathan and Nero. Nero Hawley was a slave owned by the Hawley family who won his freedom after fighting in the American Revolution. Robert Hawley and his sons; John, Edmund, and Robert, Jr. are listed in the rolls of soldiers who fought in the American Revolution from Stratford, CT.

== See also ==
- A Great Jubilee Day
- Ephraim Hawley House

== Notes ==
- William Richard Cutter, New England Families, Genealogical and Memorial, Lewis Historical Publishing, NY, 1914
- Elias Sill Hawley, The Hawley Record, Press of E. H. Hutchinson & Co., Buffalo NY, 1890
- Connecticut General Assembly, The Public Records of the Colony of Connecticut 1636-1776, Press of the Case Lockwood & Brainard, 1885
- Reverend Samuel Orcutt, History of Old Town of Stratford and the City of Bridgeport, Connecticut, Fairfield Historical Society, 1886
- William Howard Wilcoxson, History of Stratford Connecticut, 1639-1939, Higginson Book Company, 1997
- Royal R. Hinman, A Catalogue of the Names of the Early Puritan Settlers of the Colony of Connecticut, Press of Case, Tiffany and Company, Hartford, 1852
