= Ephraim Hawley House =

Building in Connecticut, United States

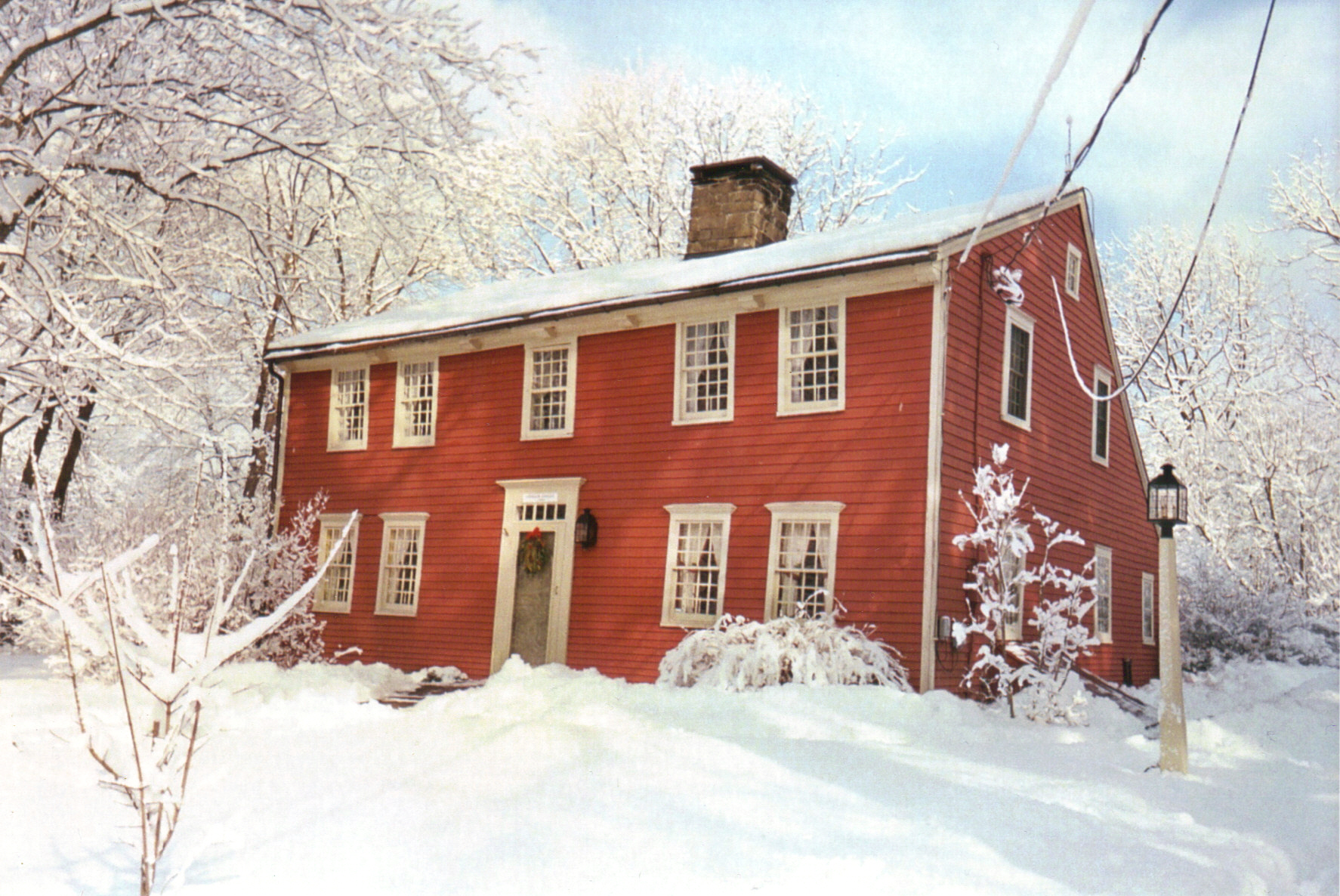
- Image 2011

- Location within Connecticut
- Former names: Sara Nichols Homestead
- Alternative names: Eliakim Hawley Place

General information
- Status: Private home
- Architectural style: Colonial, Saltbox
- Location: Nichols, Trumbull, Connecticut, United States
- Coordinates: 41.2348°N 73.1594°W
- Construction started: 1683
- Renovated: 1787, 1881, 1919, 1987
- Owner: Private

Technical details
- Structural system: post-and-beam

The Ephraim Hawley House is a privately owned Colonial American wooden post-and-beam timber-frame saltbox house situated on the Farm Highway, Route 108, on the south side of Mischa Hill, in Nichols, a village located within the town of Trumbull, Connecticut, the U.S. It was expanded to its present shape by three additions. Over time, the location of the house has been identified in four different named townships, as jurisdictional boundaries changed, but it has never been moved. These towns were Stratford (1670–1725), Unity (1725–1744), North Stratford (1744–1797), and Trumbull (1797–present).

== History ==
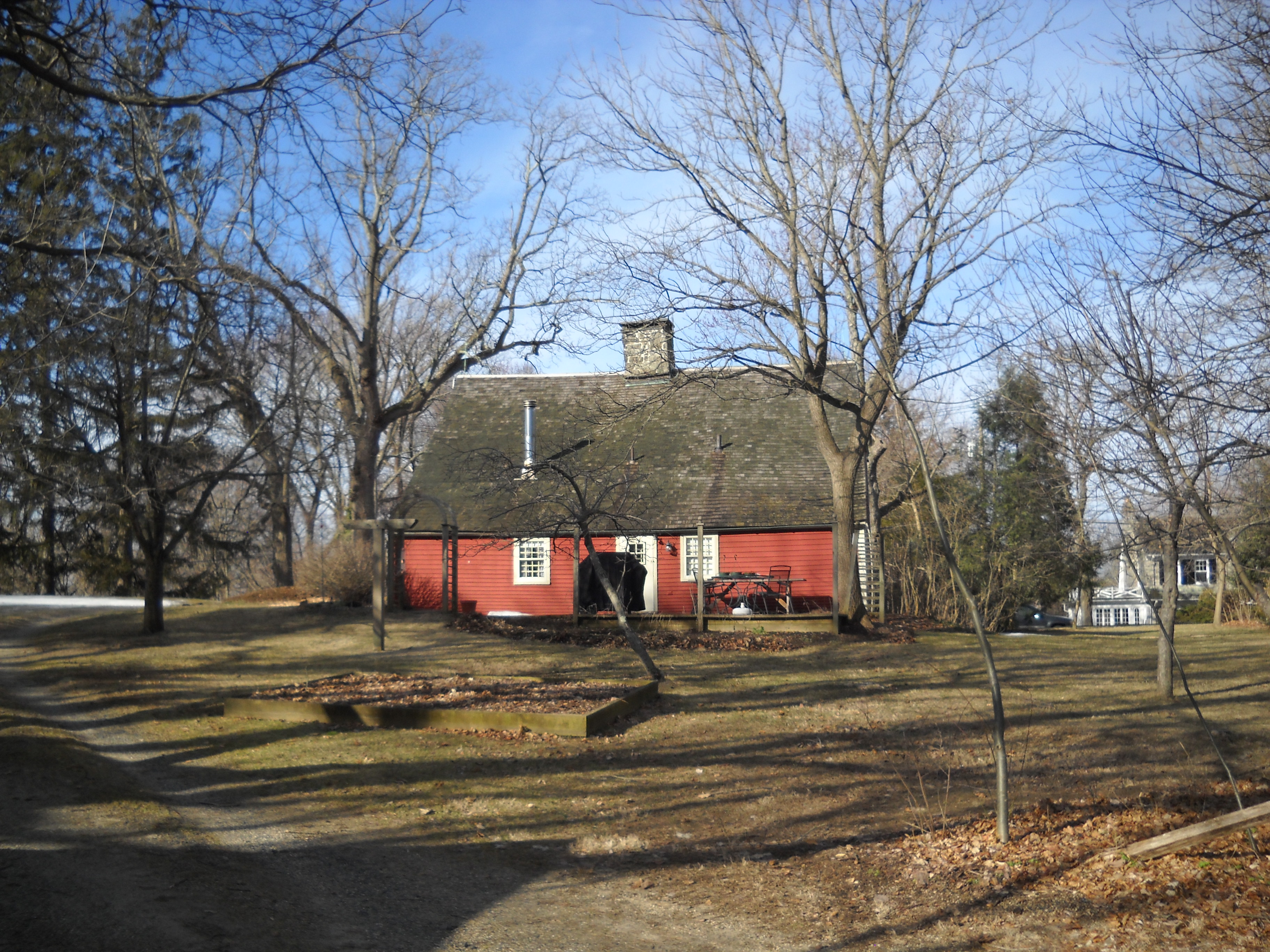
Rear view

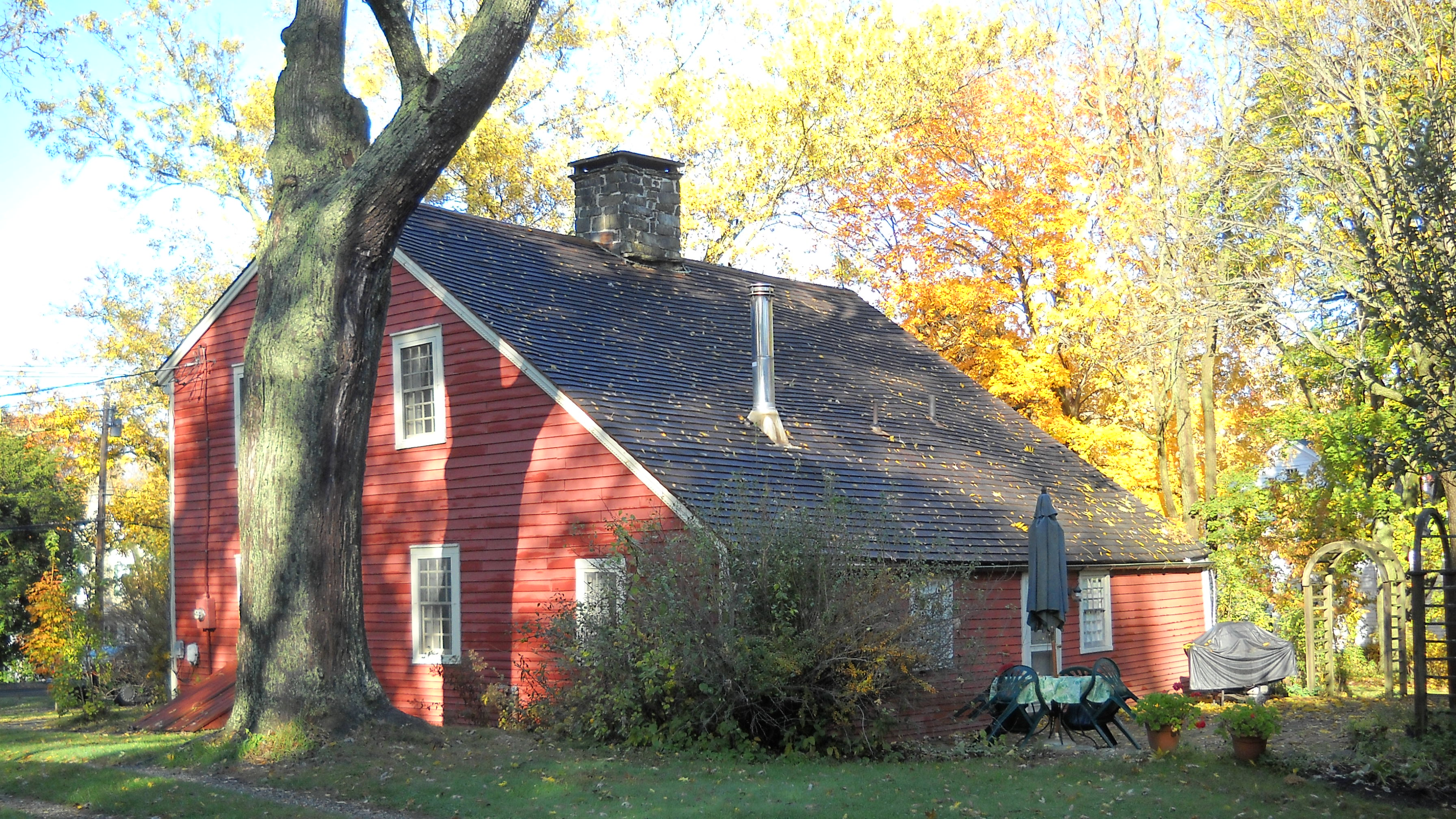
Salt box profile

=== Construction ===
The Hawley Homestead was dated to 1690 during the Works Progress Administration Federal Writers' Project conducted during the Great Depression. Joan Oppenheim created a research report on the house while studying at the Yale School of Fine Arts in the 1930s. She concluded after examining the structure and researching land records, probate records and The Hawley Record (1890), that the house was built between 1683 and 1690 by the slave owning farmer Ephraim Hawley. In 1683 he had married Sarah Welles, daughter of Colonel Samuel and Elizabeth (Hollister) Welles, and granddaughter of Connecticut Colony Governor Thomas Welles.

The date of construction was based not only upon architectural details of the house, but also upon comparisons with other homes of the period, and facts given to Oppenheim by the Curtiss family, who owned the house at the time. The Hawley Record (1890), stated that Ephraim had resided in Trumbull. Oppenheim said that the dating of the house compared with that of S.S., on file at the School of Fine Arts at Yale.

When the Trumbull Historical Society organized in 1964, they dated the house to between 1683 and 1690. The house was dated to 1671–1683 in the Historic and Architectural Resource Survey (2002) produced for the Connecticut Historical Commission by Geoffrey Rossano, PhD. The Historic and Architectural Survey of the Town of Trumbull, Connecticut (2010), produced by Heather C. Jones and Bruce G. Harvey PhD for the Connecticut Commission on Culture and Tourism, dates the house to 1670–1683.

=== Ownership ===
In 1787, Captain Robert Hawley gifted the house to his son Eliakim when he married his second cousin Sally Sara Hawley. Sally Sara Hawley lived in the house for 60 years until her death in 1847.

In April 1881, Truman Mauwee, a Schaghticoke also known as Truman Bradley, bought the house from Charles Nichols Fairchild for $450 ($100 in cash and a $350 mortgage to Fairchild). He completed the second floor Colonial Revival renovations. In October 1882, Bradley sold the house to his neighbor Clarissa Curtis for $525 ($175 cash, and Curtiss assumed the $350 mortgage to Fairchild).

=== 1964 house tour ===
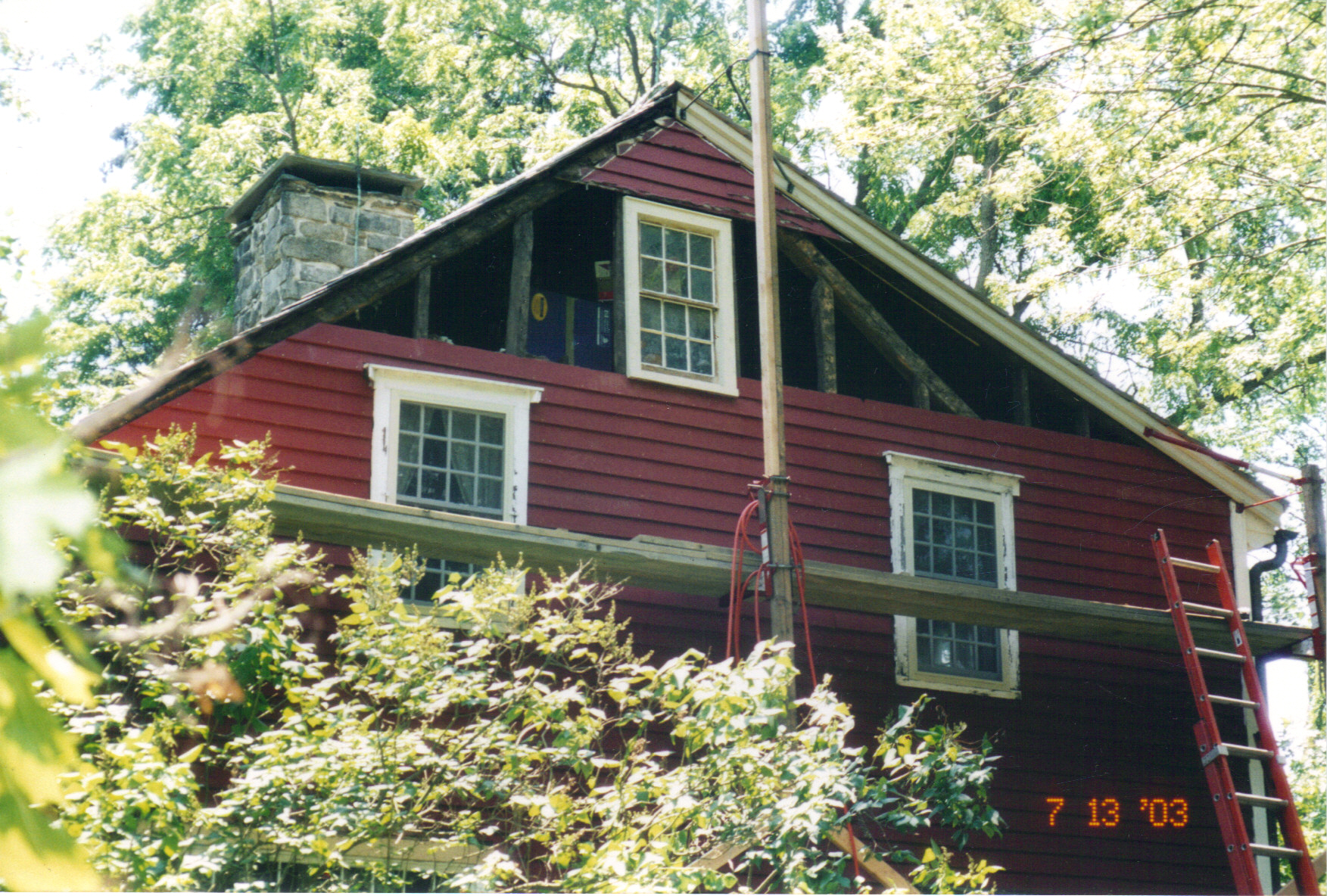
Original end rafter configuration

The Trumbull Historical Society organized its first historic house tour on October 24, 1964. Tickets to the event were $2.00. The society printed a brochure with historical information on each house on the tour, which included the Ephraim Hawley House. The brochure proclaimed, "the Ephraim Hawley House was unequivocally the oldest house in Trumbull." It was presumed that the house was "built by Ephraim Hawley between 1683 when he married and 1690 when he died." Elliott P. Curtiss owned and was residing in the house at this time, and put many of his 17th and 18th century antiques on display. The Hawley house was also featured on the cover of the first modern street map of the town of Trumbull, published in 1965.

== Structure ==
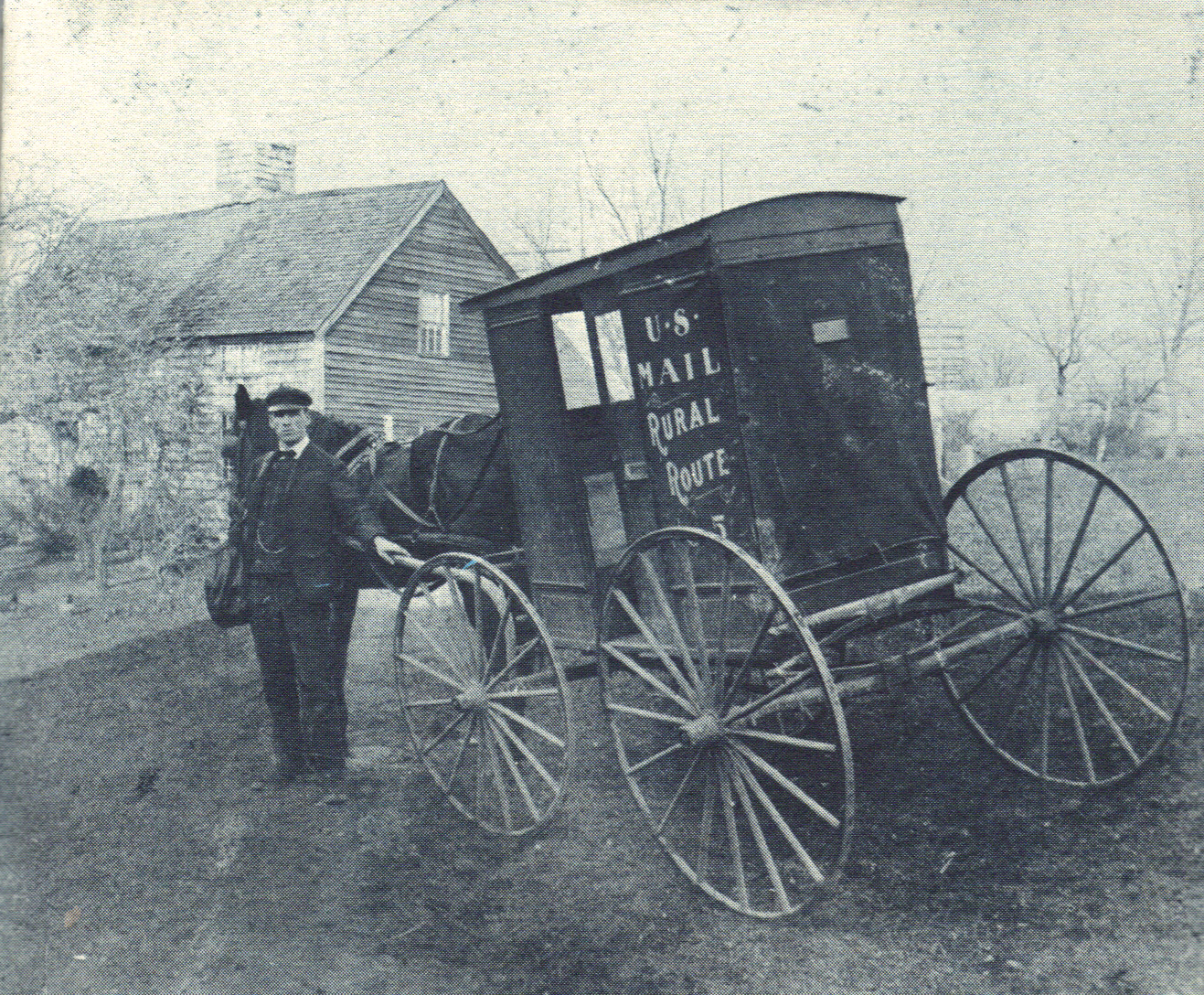
Image before 1881

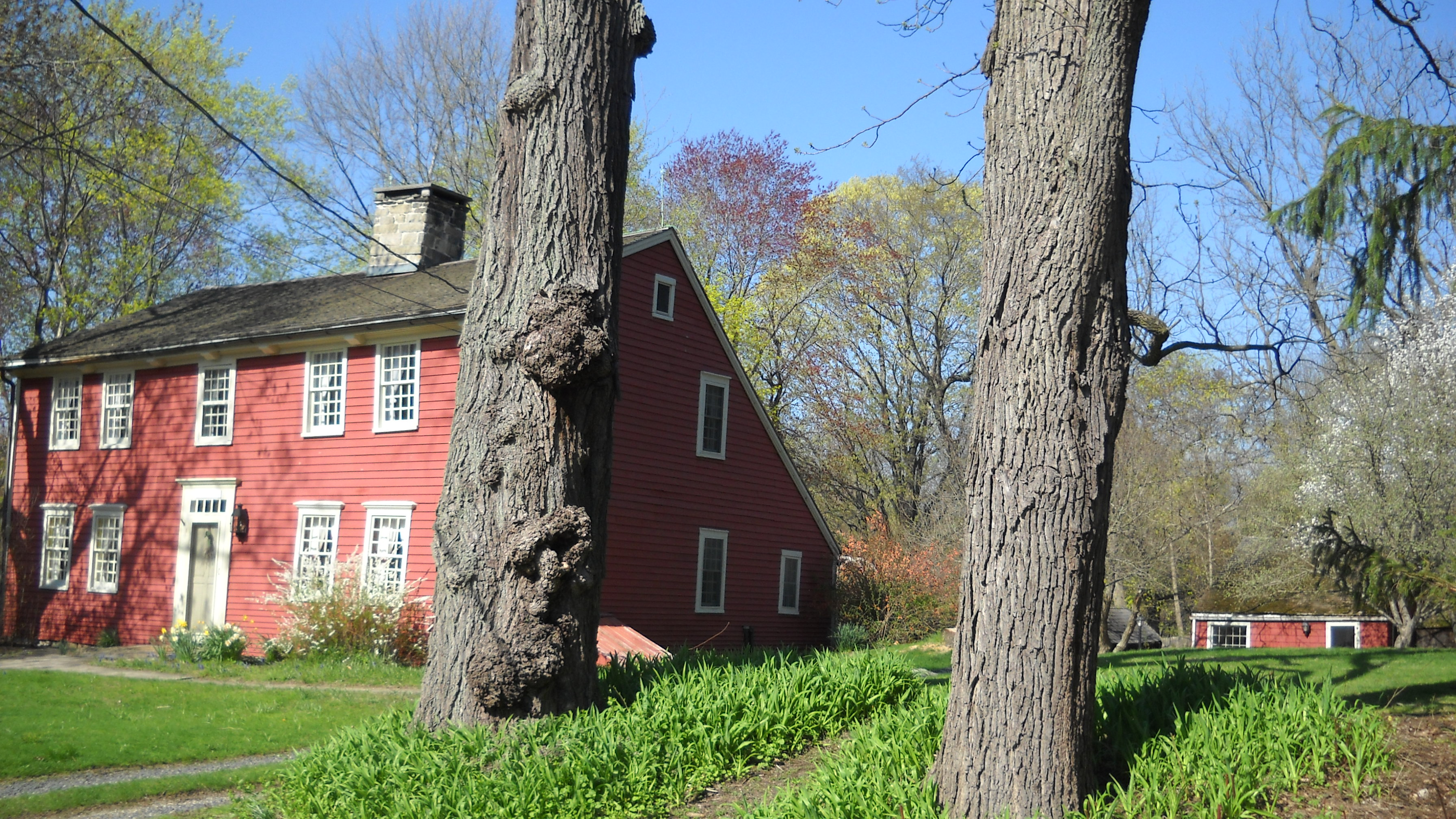
Image 2011

Original cottage

The house was built as a 1 1/2-story Cape Cod cottage thirty-six feet wide by twenty-six feet deep with an eight-foot-wide central stone chimney with three fireplaces. There were three rooms on the first floor; a parlor, dining room and kitchen. The second floor was an undivided loft.

Oak frame and siding

The white oak post-and-beam frame has eight by ten inch girts, eight by eight inch plates, and eight by ten inch splayed posts. The common rafters are eight by eight inches and taper to six by six inches at the ridge; they have six by six inch chamfered collar beams.

The floor joist are six by six inches and are twenty inches apart. The six inch by ten inch summer beams, or tie beams are parallel to the façade, dovetailed into the girts and concealed within the plaster ceiling.

The roof sheathing and flooring is vertically quarter sawn, one-inch-thick oak boards with random widths between twelve and thirty inches. The flooring is laid directly over one-inch-thick oak boards that were not suitable to be used as flooring. The mortise-and-tenon joints are held by wooden pins, and the flooring is nailed with large hand-wrought iron nails.

The four- to six-foot-length hand-riven oak clapboard siding is nailed directly to the oak studs with large flat rose-headed nails, which was the typical material and application for the earliest New England homes (see images).

Stone chimney

The first floor of the house is at ground level. There is a partial dirt cellar located on the south side of the house. The eight-foot-wide stone fireplace has three flues with clay mortar. The kitchen hearth is nine feet six inches wide by five feet seven inches deep. There is a one-foot crawl space around the chimney foundation below the first floor and a fieldstone foundation.

A forty-inch deep brick beehive oven is built into the right rear wall of the kitchen fireplace and its opening has a wrought iron lintel. The brick are seven and one-half inches long by three and one-half inches wide by two inches thick. In October 1685, because a variety of sizes of brick were being used, the Colony of Connecticut ordered that all future brick be nine inches long by four and one-half inches wide by two and one-half inches thick.

There is a small tinder box in the left wall of the kitchen firebox. The fireplace inside dimensions are four feet four inches high by six feet ten inches wide and is spanned by the original ten-by-ten-inch oak lintel, which rests on oak blocks. The side walls of the kitchen firebox are roughly dressed granite. Cooking pots were hung from a lug pole. Above the ridge, the chimney flue outside measurements are forty eight inches wide by thirty eight inches deep, with a course of three-inch thick dripstones in the front and back.

Interior finish

The original stairs were parallel to the front wall of the house and situated behind the wall separating the parlor and the kitchen. There is poplar paneling alternating in width of thirteen inches and fifteen inches. The ceilings and walls are plaster, made up of calcined oyster shells with red cattle hair. The plaster was applied on riven oak lath attached with small hand wrought iron nails. McKee writes about a Massachusetts contract dating to 1675 that specified the plasterer, “Is to lath and siele (seal) the four rooms of the house betwixt (between) the joists overhead with a coat of lime and hair upon the clay; also to fill the gable ends of the house with ricks (bricks) and plaster them with clay. To lath and plaster partitions of the house with clay and lime, and to fill, lath, and plaster them with lime and hair besides; and to siele and lath them overhead with lime; also to fill, lath, and plaster the kitchen up to the wall plate on every side. The said Daniel Andrews is to find lime, bricks, clay, stone, hair, together with laborers and workmen… .” Records of the New Haven colony mention rates for plaster and lath as early as 1641.

The ceiling heights are between six feet two inches and seven feet two inches on the first floor. The rear exterior door opening is five feet three inches high. An original casement window opening located on the east rear wall, in the kitchen, is twenty two inches square and is fifty four inches from the floor. This small opening was plastered over when the lean-to was built behind the wall in 1840. The upstairs ceiling height is six feet. The surviving oak sash window frames have dimensions of twenty eight inches wide by forty six inches high with the studs forming their jambs. The original interior doorways are twenty eight inches wide by five feet eleven inches high and the interior partitions are made of 1 1/2-inch-thick vertical oak boards.

Additions

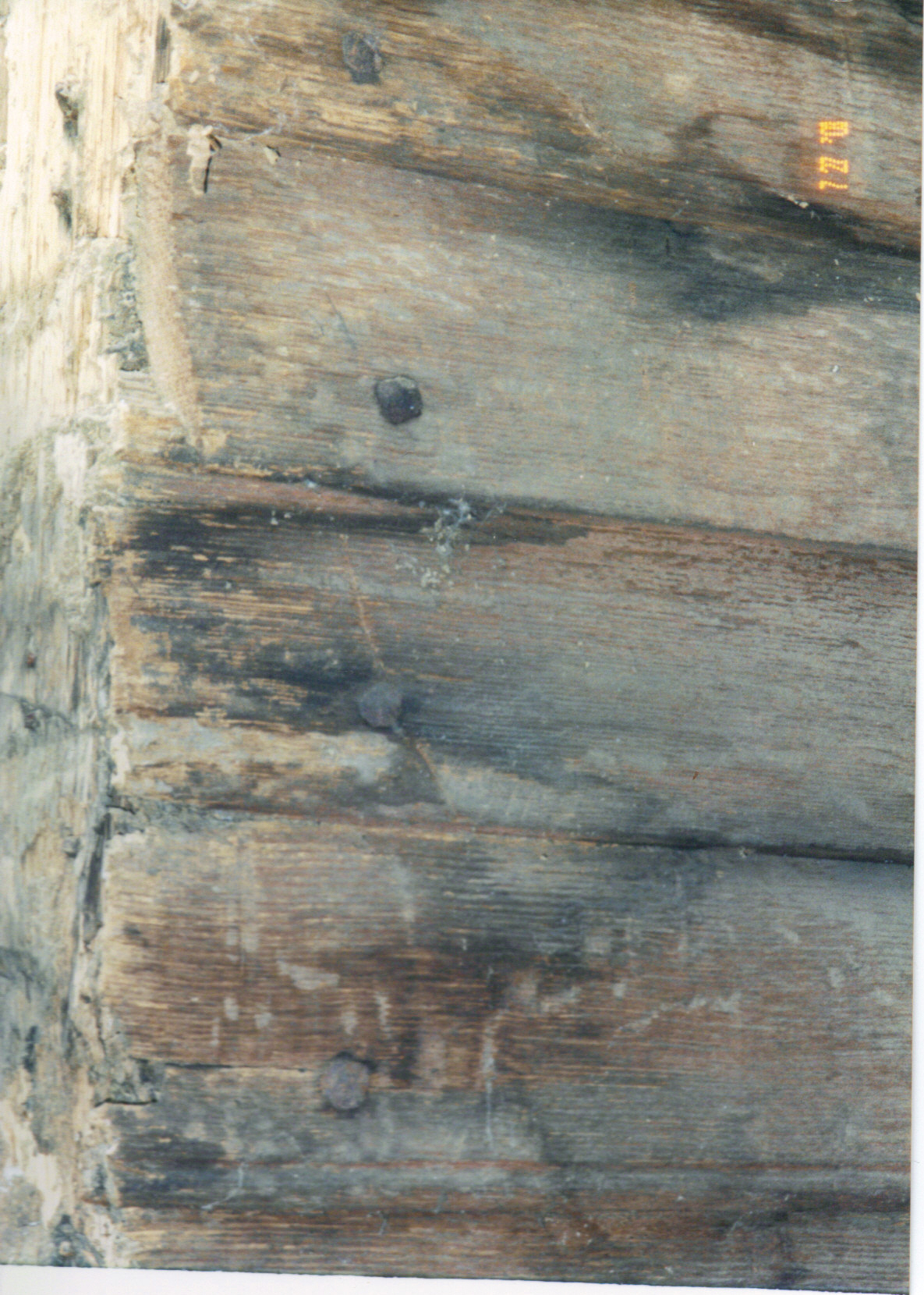
Oak clapboards lean-to attic

The first lean-to was built shortly after the main house was completed and is used as a buttery (room) or pantry. The exterior walls are solid two-inch-thick oak boards. When the lean-to was built, the roof was extended, without a break, to within six feet six inches of the ground and gave the house its saltbox shape. The second lean-to addition was added before 1881, when stairs were installed in front of the kitchen fireplace, the front roof was raised to a full two-stories in height, and the second floor was partitioned into five rooms, turning the house into a two-family residence. The original hand-riven oak clapboard exterior siding and original rafter feet are preserved in the lean-to attics.

== Current status ==
Over the last few centuries, the appearance of the house has evolved as each family has left their mark while expanding, adapting or preserving the house to accommodate changing ideas about space, function, comfort, privacy, cleanliness and fashion.

Many original architectural details remain preserved including; partial dirt cellar, field stone foundation, oak post and beam frame, oak roof sheathing, stone chimney with brick beehive oven, oak interior walls, wide-board quarter-sawn oak flooring, calcined oyster shell lime plaster walls and ceilings over riven oak lath, poplar paneling, oak batten doors, oak window frames and the original riven oak clapboard siding preserved in the lean-to attic.

== Images ==
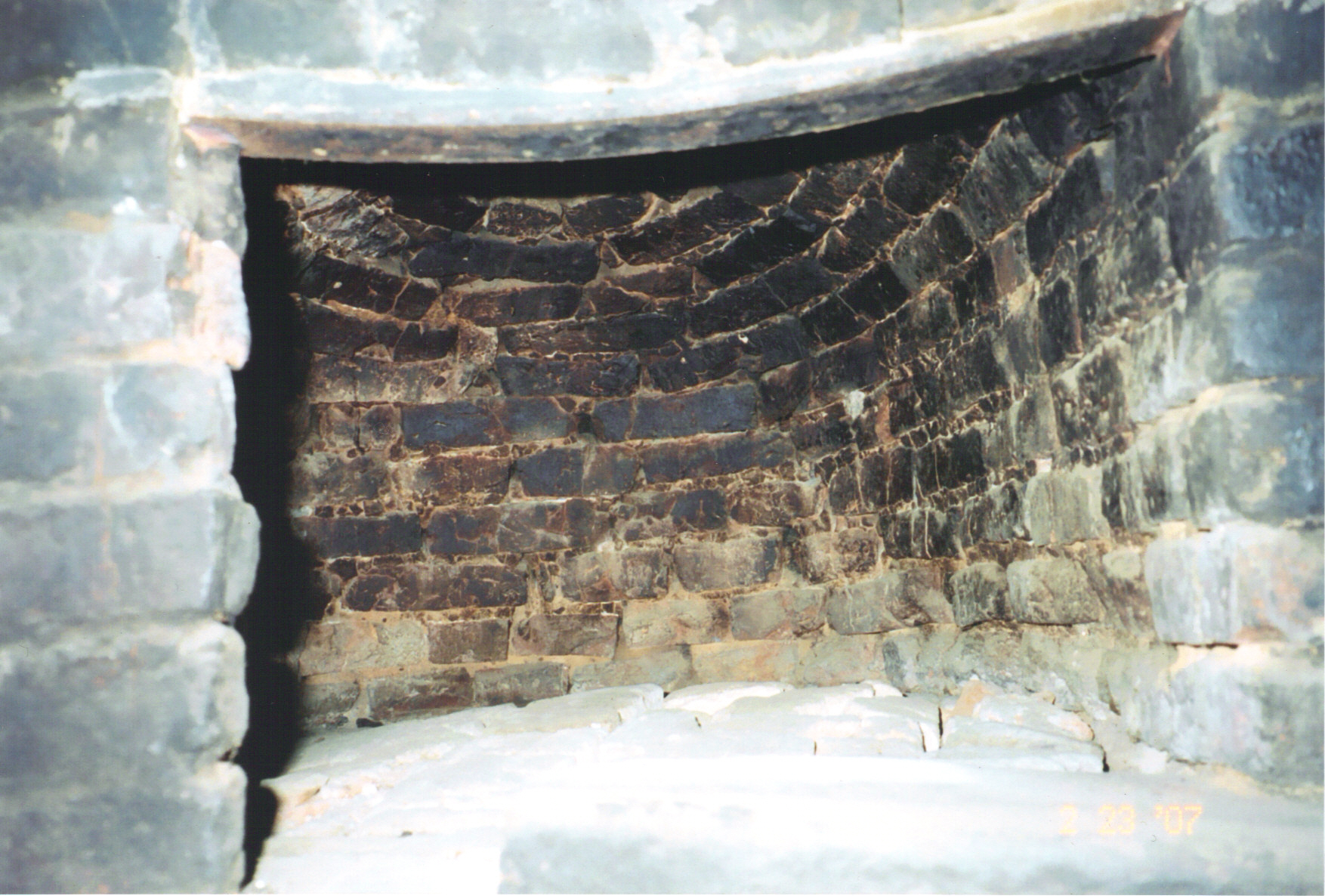
Brick beehive oven

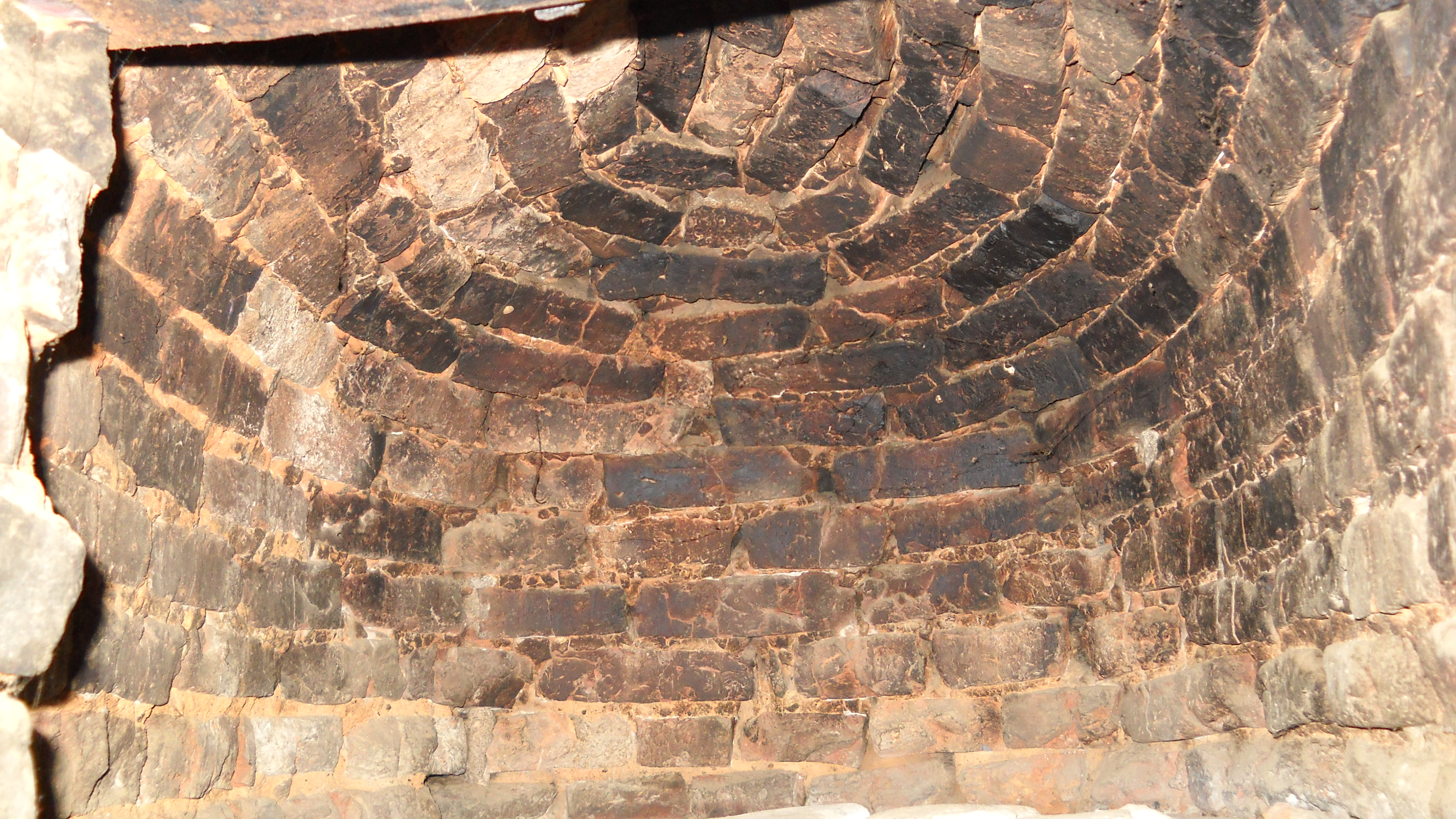
Brick beehive oven ceiling

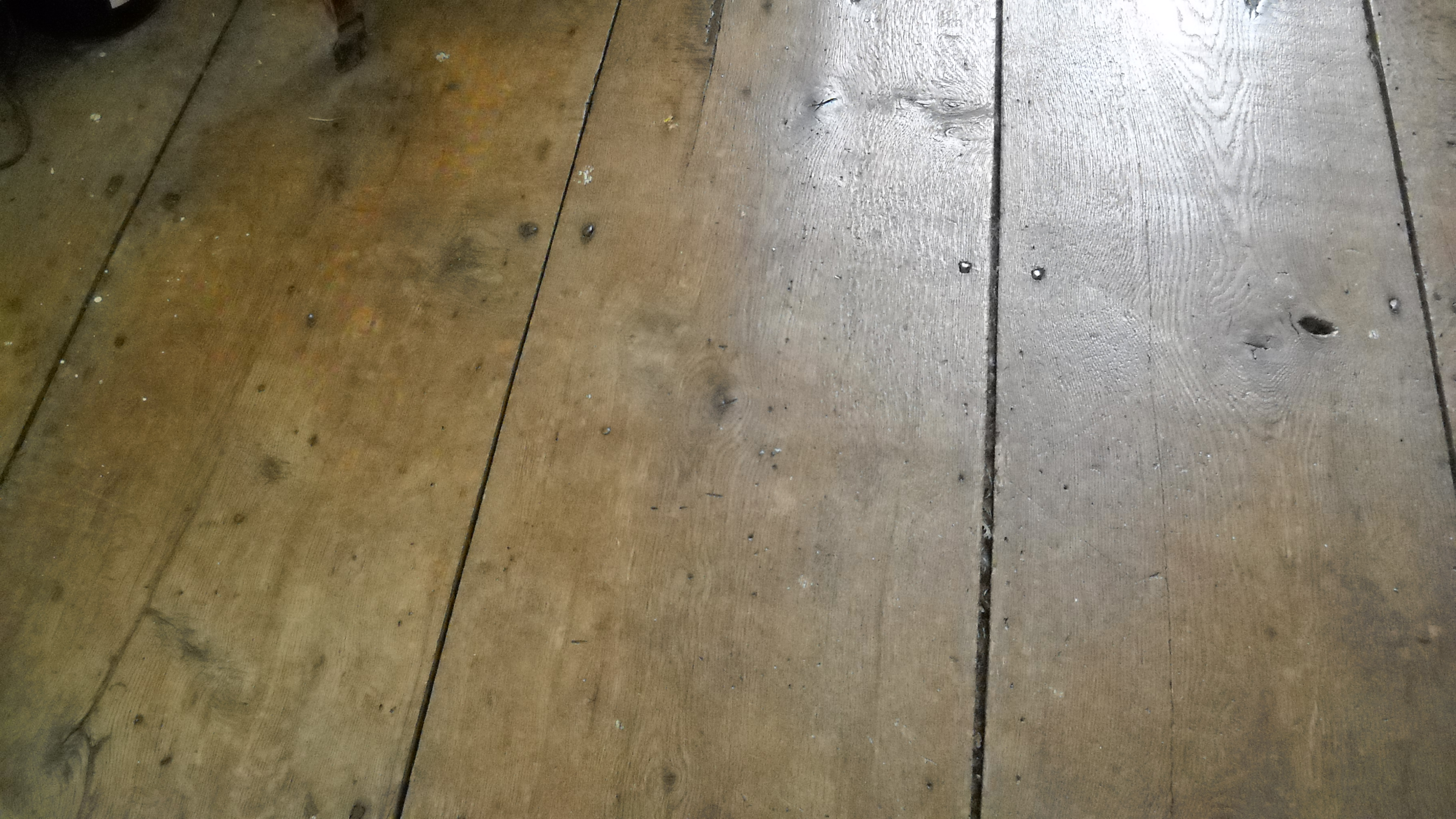
Original 16" wide quarter-sawn oak flooring

== See also ==
- List of the oldest buildings in Connecticut
- History of Trumbull, Connecticut
- Nichols, Connecticut
- Nichols Farms Historic District
- Stratford, Connecticut
- Trumbull, Connecticut
- Thomas Hawley House
