= Adam Blakeman =

English priest (1598–1665)

Reverend Adam Blakeman
- Born: 10 June 1598
- Died: 7 September 1665 (aged 67)
- Education: Christ Church, Oxford
- Occupation: Reverend

Rev. Adam Blakeman (10 June 1598 – 7 September 1665) was an English Church of England clergyman who was an early migrant to New England and a founder of Stratford, Connecticut.

Blakeman was born in Staffordshire, England in 1598, according to his matriculation records at Christ Church College, Oxford. (There is a 1596 baptismal record for an Adam Blakeman at Gnosall, Staffordshire, but the Oxford University records suggest that was a different (though likely related) Adam Blakeman.)

Blakeman matriculated (entered college) at Christ Church, Oxford on 28 May 1617. He was a preacher for some years in Great Bowden, Leicestershire, and in Derbyshire, and in 1638 went to Connecticut. In 1639 he led the original settlers of Stratford, Connecticut, and served as the first minister of the church until his death on 7 September 1665.

Stratford, like a number of other New England towns of the 1630s, was founded as a Utopian community by Puritans fleeing persecution in England. The town's minister was also its political leader, and ruled both his flock and his town as the unquestioned representative of God.

During the 17th century (and until well into the 19th century) consistent spelling of names was not enforced, due to lower literacy levels and the absence of the standardization required by government bureaucracies. By 1800 Blakeman's descendants most often used the Blackman spelling of the name, although in the 18th century some alternated between the two spellings three times in successive generations. Records of Christ Church, Oxford use the Blakeman spelling and the name Blakeman is still common in Coventry, England. (Office for National Statistics, UK Census 2001)
