= Stratford Center Historic District =

Historic district in Connecticut, United States

- U.S. National Register of Historic Places
- U.S. Historic district
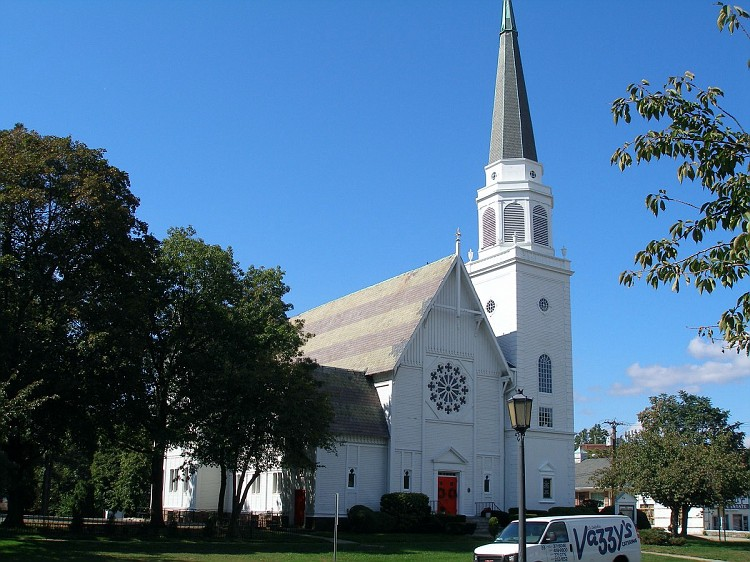
- First Congregational Church

- Location within Connecticut Location within the United States
- Location: Roughly bounded by East Broadway, Ferry Boulevard., Housatonic River, Connecticut Turnpike, Birdseye and Main Streets, Stratford, Connecticut
- Coordinates: 41°11′10″N 73°7′49″W
- Area: 220 acres (89 ha)
- Architect: Eidlitz, Leopold; Schimdt, Frederick
- Architectural style: Late 19th and 20th Century Revivals, Late Victorian, Federal
- NRHP reference No.: 83003511
- Added to NRHP: December 22, 1983

The Stratford Center Historic District is a 220-acre (89 ha) historic district in Stratford, Connecticut. The district was listed on the National Register of Historic Places in 1983. It then included 257 contributing buildings.

It is significant for historical association, for architecture, and for information potential (the latter for possible archeological investigation of the Academy Hill Green area of a 17th-century fort.

Selected significant elements in the district include:

- Capt. David Judson House, 967 Academy Hill, built 1723, which in 1978 was a museum run by the Stratford Historical Society
- William A. Booth House, 956 Broad Street, built 1857, designed by architect Leopold Eidlitz in "Swiss Chalet" style
- Lieut. William Thompson House, 904 East Broadway, a saltbox from 1762
- Christ Episcopal Church, built in 1723 for the first Episcopal parish (established 1707) in the State of Connecticut.
- Old Episcopal burying ground, resting place of founding father William Samuel Johnson.
- First Congregational Church, 2301 Main Street (accompanying photograph #7)

The district also includes dozens of other historical houses and once included the American Shakespeare Theatre, a singular 1500 seat venue where popular American stage and screen actors once performed.

== See also ==
- National Register of Historic Places listings in Fairfield County, Connecticut
