= Stratford, Connecticut =

- Town
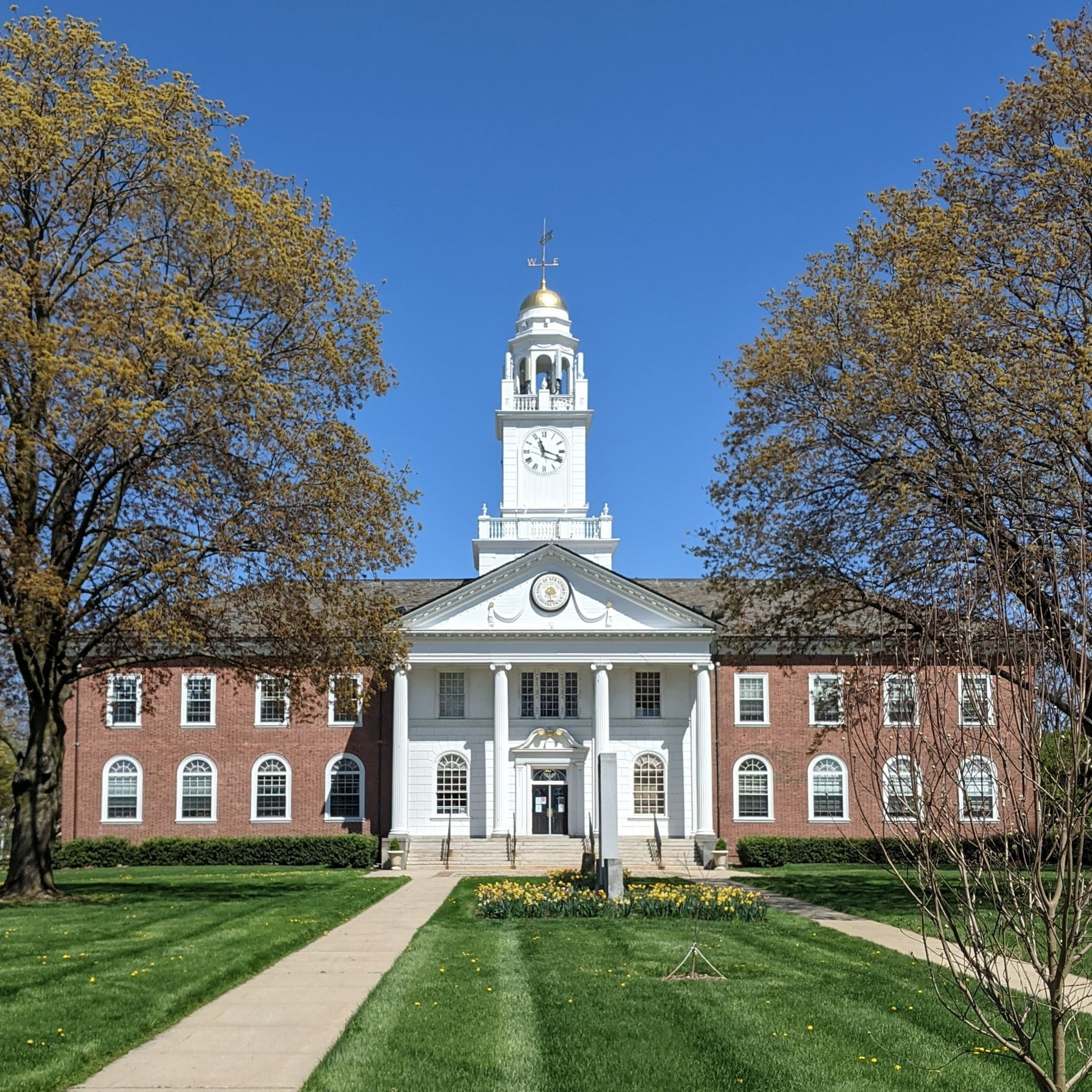
- Stratford Town Hall

- Seal

- Coordinates: 41°12′16″N 73°07′47″W
- Country: United States
- U.S. state: Connecticut
- County: Fairfield
- Region: CT Metropolitan
- Settled: 1639
- Incorporated: April 13, 1643
- Named for: Stratford-upon-Avon

Government
  - Type: Mayor-council
  - Mayor: David Chess (D)
  - Town Council: Jean Collier (D); Chris Green (D); William Boyd (D); Rene Gibson (D); Anthony Afriyie (D); Phil Young (D); Lisa Carroll-Fabian (D); Carl Glad (R); George Zamary (R); Paul Aurelia (R)

Area
  - Total: 19.9 sq mi (51.5 km^{2})
  - Land: 17.6 sq mi (45.6 km^{2})
  - Water: 2.3 sq mi (5.9 km^{2})
- Elevation: 49 ft (15 m)

Population (2020)
  - Total: 52,355
  - Density: 2,974.7/sq mi (1,148.5/km^{2})
- Time zone: UTC−5 (Eastern)
  - Summer (DST): UTC−4 (Eastern)
- ZIP Codes: 06614, 06615
- Area code: 203/475
- FIPS code: 09-74190
- GNIS feature ID: 0213514
- Website: townofstratford.com

Stratford is a town in Fairfield County, Connecticut, United States. It is situated on Long Island Sound at the mouth of the Housatonic River. The town is part of the Greater Bridgeport Planning Region and the Bridgeport–Stamford–Norwalk Metropolitan Statistical Area a component of the greater New York metropolitan area. It was settled by the Puritans in 1639.

The population was 52,355 as of the 2020 census. It is bordered on the west by Bridgeport, to the north by Trumbull and Shelton, and on the east by Milford (across the Housatonic River). Stratford has a historical legacy in aviation, the military, and theater.

== History ==
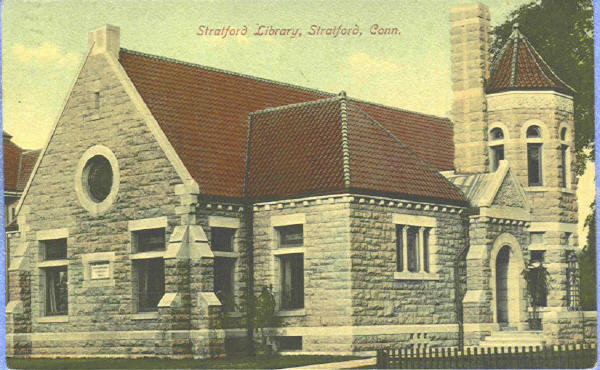
Stratford Public Library, as seen in a 1909 postcard

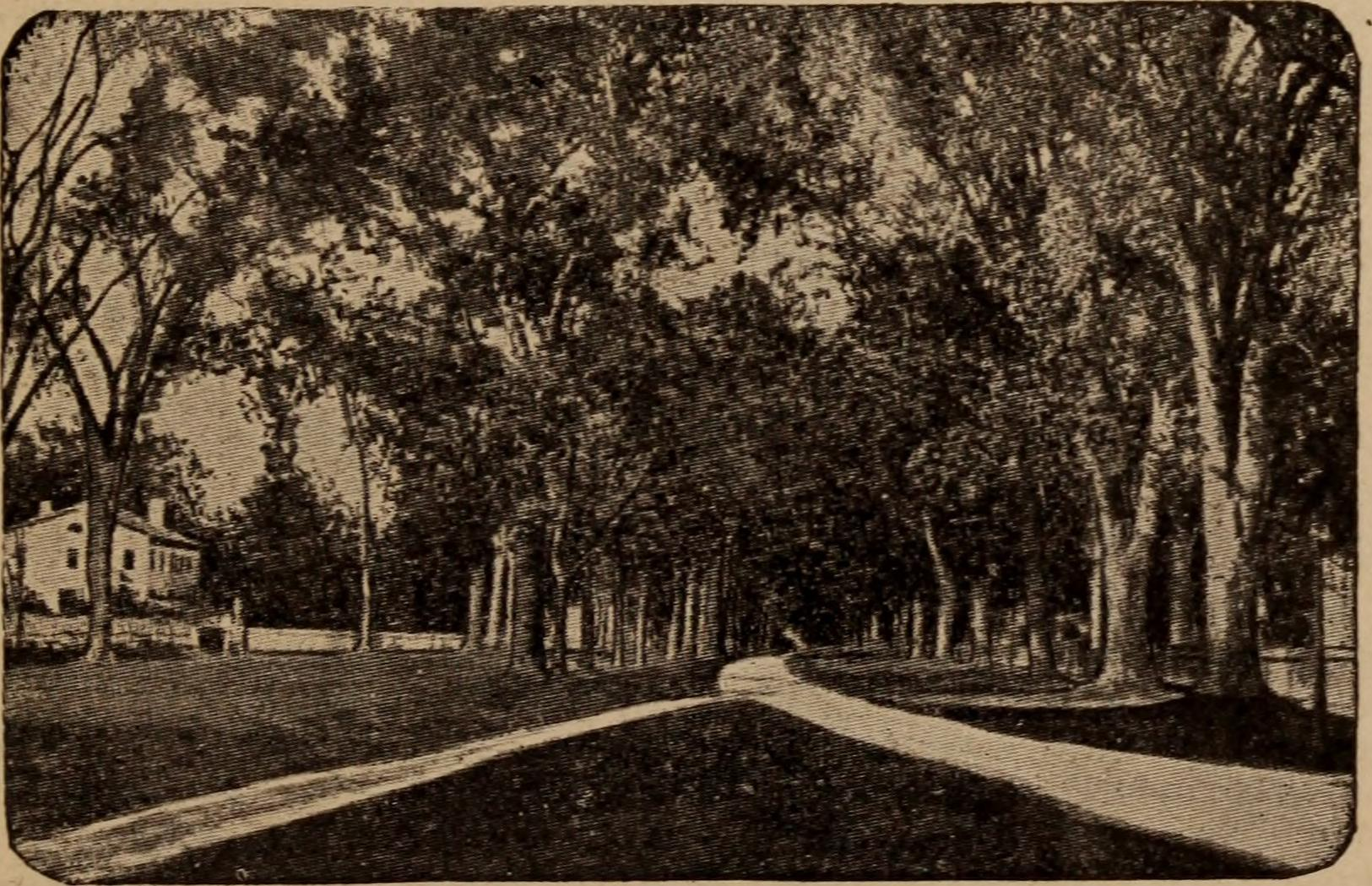
Street of the Triple Elms, as seen in the 1890s

=== Founding and Puritan era ===
Stratford was founded in 1639 by Puritan leader Reverend Adam Blakeman, William Beardsley, and either 16 families (according to legend) or approximately 35 families (suggested by later research) who had recently arrived in Connecticut Colony from England seeking religious freedom. In 1639 the General Court in Hartford made reference to the town as the "new plantation at Pequannock". In 1640 the community was known as Cupheag, a Native American Paugussett word meaning "at the enclosed place" or "place of shelter". By April 13, 1643, the growing town was known as Stratford, in honor of Stratford-upon-Avon in England.

Stratford is one of many towns in the northeastern American colonies founded as part of the Great Migration in the 1630s when Puritan families fled an increasingly polarized England in the decade before the civil war between Charles I and Parliament. Some of the Stratford settlers were from families who had first moved from England to the Netherlands to seek religious freedom, like their predecessors on the Mayflower, and decided to come to the New World when their children began to adopt Dutch culture and language. Like other Puritan or Pilgrim towns founded during this time, early Stratford was a place where church leadership and town leadership were united under the pastor of the church, in this case Reverend Blakeman. The goal of the communities was to create perfect outposts of religious idealism where the wilderness would separate them from the interference of kings, parliaments, or any other secular authority. During the witch trials in Connecticut, Goody Bassett was hanged in Stratford in May 1651.

Blakeman ruled Stratford until his death in 1665, but as the second generation of Stratford grew up, many of the children rejected what they perceived as the exceptional austerity of the town's founders. They and later generations sought to change the religious dictums of their elders, and the utopian nature of Stratford and similar communities was gradually replaced with more standard colonial administration. By the late 17th century, the Connecticut government had assumed political control over Stratford.

Many descendants of the original founding Puritan families remain in Stratford today after over 350 years; for centuries they often intermarried within the original small group of 17th century Pilgrim families. Despite its Puritan origins, Stratford was the site of the first Anglican church in Connecticut, founded in 1707 and ministered by the Rev. Dr. Samuel Johnson. Settlers from Stratford founded other cities and towns including Newark, New Jersey established in 1666 by members of the Stratford founding families who believed the town's religious purity had been compromised by the changes after Blakeman's death. Cambria, New York (now Lockport, New York) and other towns were founded or expanded around new churches by Stratford descendants taking part in the westward migration. President Gerald Ford was a descendant of one of the Stratford founding families which was led by .

=== Towns created from Stratford ===
Stratford was one of the two principal settlements in southwestern Connecticut, the other being Fairfield. Over time it gave rise to several new towns which broke off and incorporated separately. These towns were created from parts of Stratford:

- Shelton (originally Ripton) in 1789; in 1789 Ripton Parish separated from Stratford and became the Town of Huntington

- Monroe created from Huntington in 1823

- Nichols (originally Unity in 1725, then North Stratford in 1744)
- Long Hill, (merged with Unity to form North Stratford in 1744)

- Trumbull, North Stratford separated from Stratford and became the town of Trumbull in 1797

- Bridgeport (also partly from Fairfield) in 1821

=== Nineteenth and Twentieth Centuries ===
A trolley was built connecting Lordship to Bridgeport in 1914, connecting the resort area to the neighboring city.

== Geography ==
According to the United States Census Bureau, the town has a total area of 19.9 square miles (52 km^{2}), of which 17.6 square miles (46 km^{2}) is land and 2.3 square miles (6.0 km^{2}), or 11.52%, is water. Stratford has a minimum elevation of zero feet above sea level along its coastline, with a maximum altitude of 295 feet (90 m) near its northern border, and an average elevation of 23 feet (7.0 m).

=== Coastline and islands ===
The town contains five islands, all in the Housatonic River. These are Carting Island, Long Island, Peacock Island, and Pope's Flat north of Interstate 95, as well as Goose Island. None of the islands are habitable because of their low elevations. A sixth island known as Brinsmade Island washed away prior to 1964.

=== Beaches ===
Long Beach – Approximately 1.5 miles (2.4 km) long, the eastern end of the beach is open to the public and has parking and lifeguards. The central part of the beach is a nature preserve whose land is set aside for wildlife, particularly nesting raptors like American kestrels and ospreys. The western end of the beach was once the site of about 40 cottages, which were abandoned because of the town's discontinuation of the lease to the land. The cottages were demolished in fall 2010.

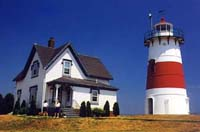
Stratford Point Light

Russian Beach – Located between Long and Short beaches, Russian Beach has parking and the Point-No-Point walkway. Fishing is allowed, as is swimming although the beach has no lifeguards.

Short Beach – Short Beach Park is 30 acres (120,000 m^{2}) in size and sits at the mouth of the Housatonic River. It has three picnic pavilions, basketball courts, tennis courts, volleyball courts, a handicapped-accessible playground, a skateboard park, a lighted softball field, a soccer field, two baseball fields and a lacrosse field. The beach has 1,000 feet (300 m) of frontage with a concession stand, bathrooms, a deck and lifeguards. The park is home to Short Beach Golf Course, a nine-hole par-3 course.

=== Great Salt Marsh ===
The Great Meadows Unit of the Stewart B. McKinney National Wildlife Refuge is a key bird migration stopover. The open water area of the Great Salt Marsh is known as Lewis Gut.

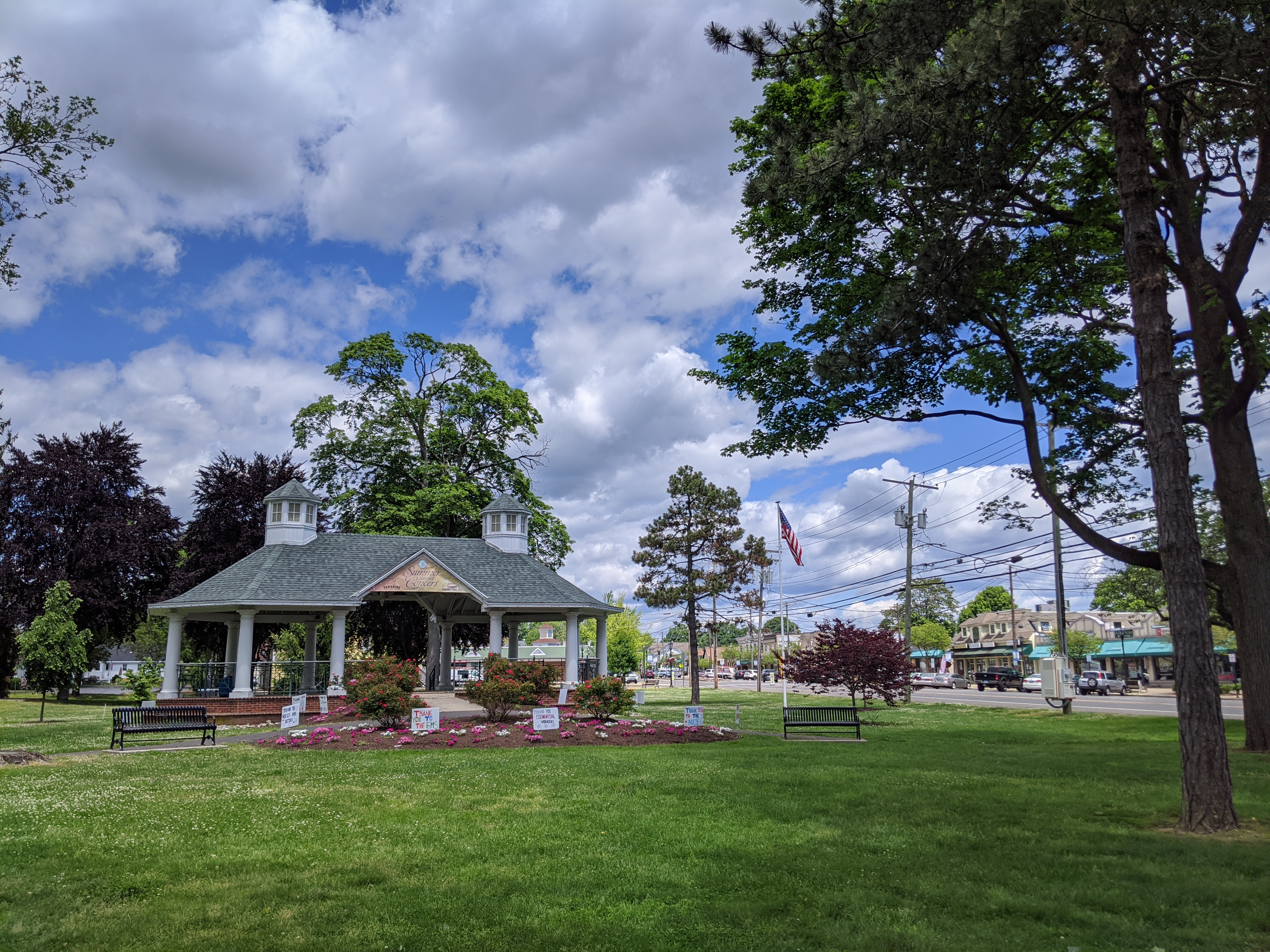
Paradise Green Park; shops in Paradise Green include a pharmacy, ice cream shop, restaurants, and a bakery

=== Neighborhoods ===
- Beaver Dam
- Birdseye
- Floral Park
- Hawley Lane (shared with Trumbull)
- Historic District
- Hollister Heights
- Lordship
- Long Beach
- Oronoque
- Oronoque Hills
- Oronoque Village
- Paradise Green
- Peck's Mill
- Putney
- South End
- Stony Brook Gardens
- Stratford Center
- Stratford Downtown
- Success Village
- Wooster Park

=== Roosevelt Forest ===
Located in the north end of Stratford, this 250-acre (1.0 km^{2}) site is primarily a mixed deciduous forest, with some wetlands and ponds. Named for President Franklin D. Roosevelt, it was set aside in the 1930s, when much of the infrastructure was created as a Works Progress Administration project. The forest includes campsites with cooking pits, picnic tables, and walking trails.

=== Superfund sites ===
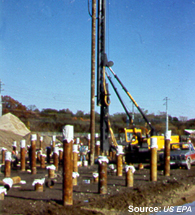
Cleanup of a Raymark Industries Superfund site, in Stratford

Stratford is the location of two Superfund sites designated by the United States Environmental Protection Agency including a variety of locations related to asbestos dumping and disposal by Raymark Industries, whose manufacturing was previously headquartered in Stratford, and the former Stratford Army Engine Plant. The Raymark site is on the EPA's National Priorities List. Stratford Army Engine Plant is not on the National Priorities list, but is being cleaned up by the U.S. Army.

From 1919 to 1989, Raymark manufactured brake pads and other friction products for the automobile industry under the name Raybestos. The company disposed of wastes containing lead, asbestos, PCBs, and other hazardous substances at its Stratford manufacturing plant. Raymark dried the waste material and made it available for use as fill material for lawns, playgrounds, and schoolyards. In 1993, the EPA and the Connecticut Department of Environmental Protection began working together to complete the cleanup of contamination Raymark left in Stratford. EPA completed its cleanup of the contaminated residential properties in 1995 and the former Raymark plant property in 1997. Plans for cleanup of the Ferry Creek area and surrounding properties where additional Raymark waste was historically disposed are being developed by the EPA. The cost of cleaning up the Raymark Site is estimated to have exceeded $200 million.

== Demographics ==
Historical population
Census	Pop.	Note	%±
1820	3,438		—
1850	2,040		—
1860	2,294		12.5%
1870	3,032		32.2%
1880	4,251		40.2%
1890	2,608		−38.6%
1900	3,657		40.2%
1910	5,712		56.2%
1920	12,347		116.2%
1930	19,212		55.6%
1940	22,580		17.5%
1950	33,428		48.0%
1960	45,012		34.7%
1970	49,775		10.6%
1980	50,541		1.5%
1990	49,389		−2.3%
2000	49,976		1.2%
2010	51,384		2.8%
2020	52,355		1.9%
U.S. Decennial Census

As of the census of 2010, there were 51,384 people, 20,095 households, and 13,614 families residing in the town. The population density was 2,919.5 inhabitants per square mile (1,127.2/km^{2}). There were 21,091 housing units at an average density of 1,198.4 per square mile (462.7/km^{2}). The racial makeup of the town was 76.4% White, 14.3% Black or African American, 0.2% Native American, 2.4% Asian, 0.1% Pacific Islander, 4.2% from other races, and 2.5% from two or more races. Hispanic or Latino of any race were 13.8% of the population.

There were 20,095 households, of which 28.2% had children under the age of 18 living with them, 49.1% were married couples living together, 14.2% had a female householder with no husband present, and 32.3% were non-families. 27.3% of all households were made up of individuals, and 13.5% had someone living alone who was 65 years of age or older. The average household size was 2.54 and the average family size was 3.11.

In the town, the population was spread out, with 23.0% under the age of 18, 5.8% from 18 to 24, 28.5% from 25 to 44, 23.5% from 45 to 64, and 19.2% who were 65 years of age or older. The median age was 42.2 years. For every 100 females, there were 89.0 males. For every 100 females age 18 and over, there were 85.6 males. The median income for a household in the town was $53,494, and the median income for a family was $64,364. Males had a median income of $45,552 versus $34,575 for females. The per capita income for the town was $26,501. About 3.5% of families and 5.0% of the population were below the poverty line, including 5.6% of those under age 18 and 5.8% of those age 65 or over.

== Economy ==
=== Top employers ===
Top employers in Stratford according to the town's 2025 Comprehensive Annual Financial Report

#	Employer	# of Employees
1	Lockheed Martin-Sikorsky Aircraft	5,734
2	Town of Stratford	1,613
3	FedEx Ground	1,200
4	Lord Chamberlain	482
5	Burns Construction	405
6	Ashcroft Holdings	400
7	EnCon	317
8	Connecticut Distributor	305
9	Nuovo Pasta	275
10	Bridgeport Fittings	241

In 1939, one of the world's first successful commercial helicopters was developed in Stratford by Igor Sikorsky and flown at his plant. His company, Sikorsky Aircraft Corporation, is still the town's largest employer. Also in 1939, Lycoming Engines produced Wright radial engines here. After World War II, the plant was converted to produce turbines.

The Vought-Sikorsky Aircraft Division in Stratford built 7,829 F4U fighters from 1940 to 1952, including the prototype. The planes were in extensive combat in the Pacific Theatre of operations during World War II, and played a supporting role in the Korean War. A Corsair sits on a pedestal at the airport as a memorial to the war effort. The Stratford Eagles Composite Squadron, Civil Air Patrol, is based in Stratford, at the Sikorsky Memorial Airport. Athletic Brewing Company, the leading U.S. manufacturer of non-alcoholic craft beer, with a 61% market share in 2021 is based in Stratford.

=== Sikorsky Aircraft ===
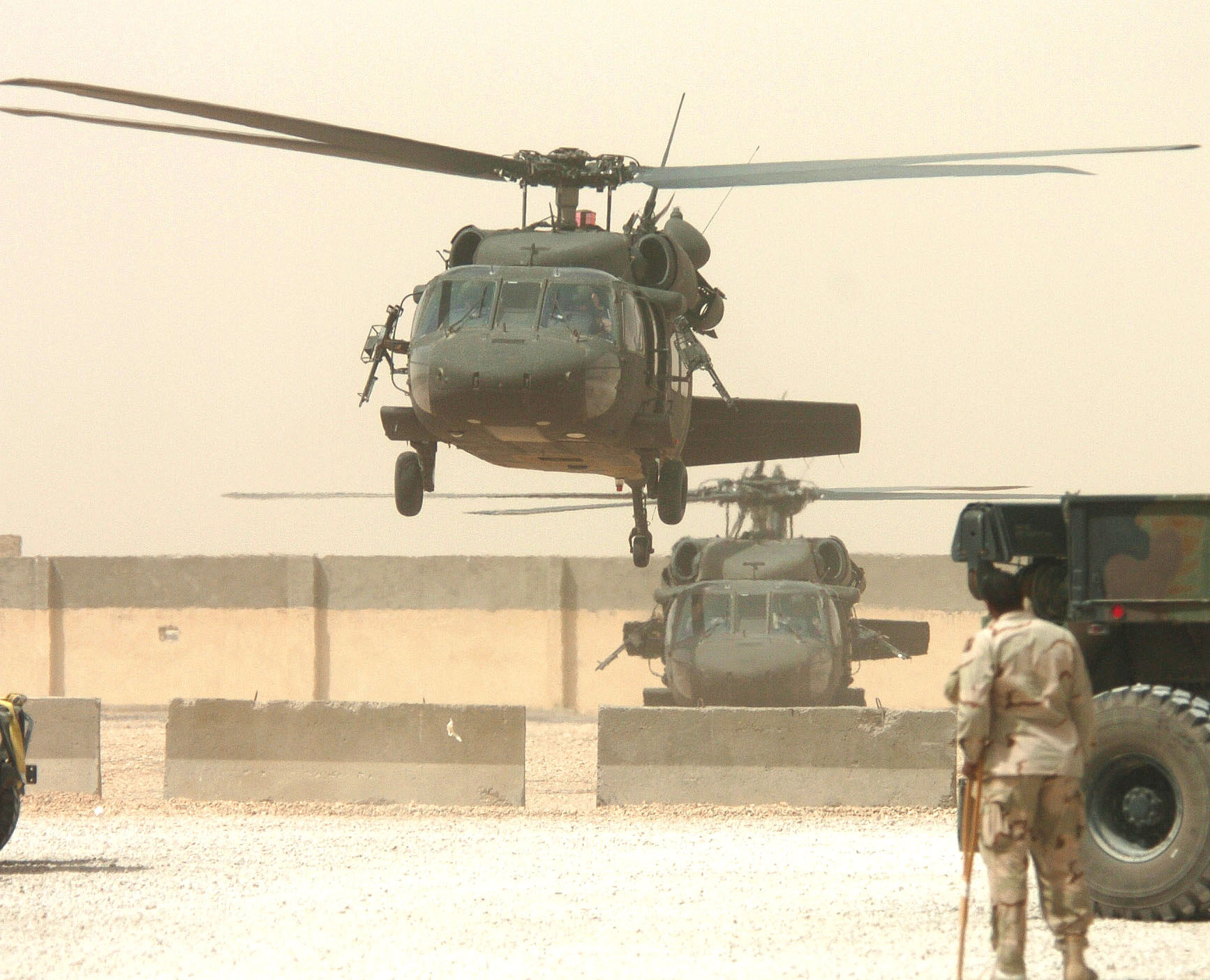
Sikorsky Aircraft Black Hawk helicopters in Iraq in 2005

Stratford is home to the headquarters of Sikorsky Aircraft, a Lockheed Martin (LMT) subsidiary founded by Igor Sikorsky, developer of the first successful American helicopter. Every Marine One (the helicopter of the president of the United States) has been manufactured in Stratford since 1957. On July 20, 2015, Lockheed Martin announced an agreement to purchase Sikorsky Aircraft from UTC for $9 billion.

=== Stratford Army Engine Plant ===
The Stratford Army Engine Plant (SAEP) was a U.S. Army Tank-Automotive and Armaments Command installation and manufacturing facility, located along the Housatonic River and Main Street opposite Sikorsky Airport. Because of the Base Realignment and Closure actions of the United States Department of Defense, closure of the plant was recommended in July 1995. The SAEP closed on September 30, 1998. For the next 11 years the Army was involved with "Team Stratford" to develop the property. The United States Army, which owns the 78-acre (320,000 m^{2}) site, auctioned it off on March 19, 2008, with a winning bid of $9,612,000 which also includes the 1,720,000-square-foot (160,000 m^{2}) facility of over fifty buildings. The bid failed to be paid off and is being placed for rebid. Robert Hartmann of Hartmann Development has a $1 billion plan to develop the former Army engine plant into a destination resort.

== Transportation ==
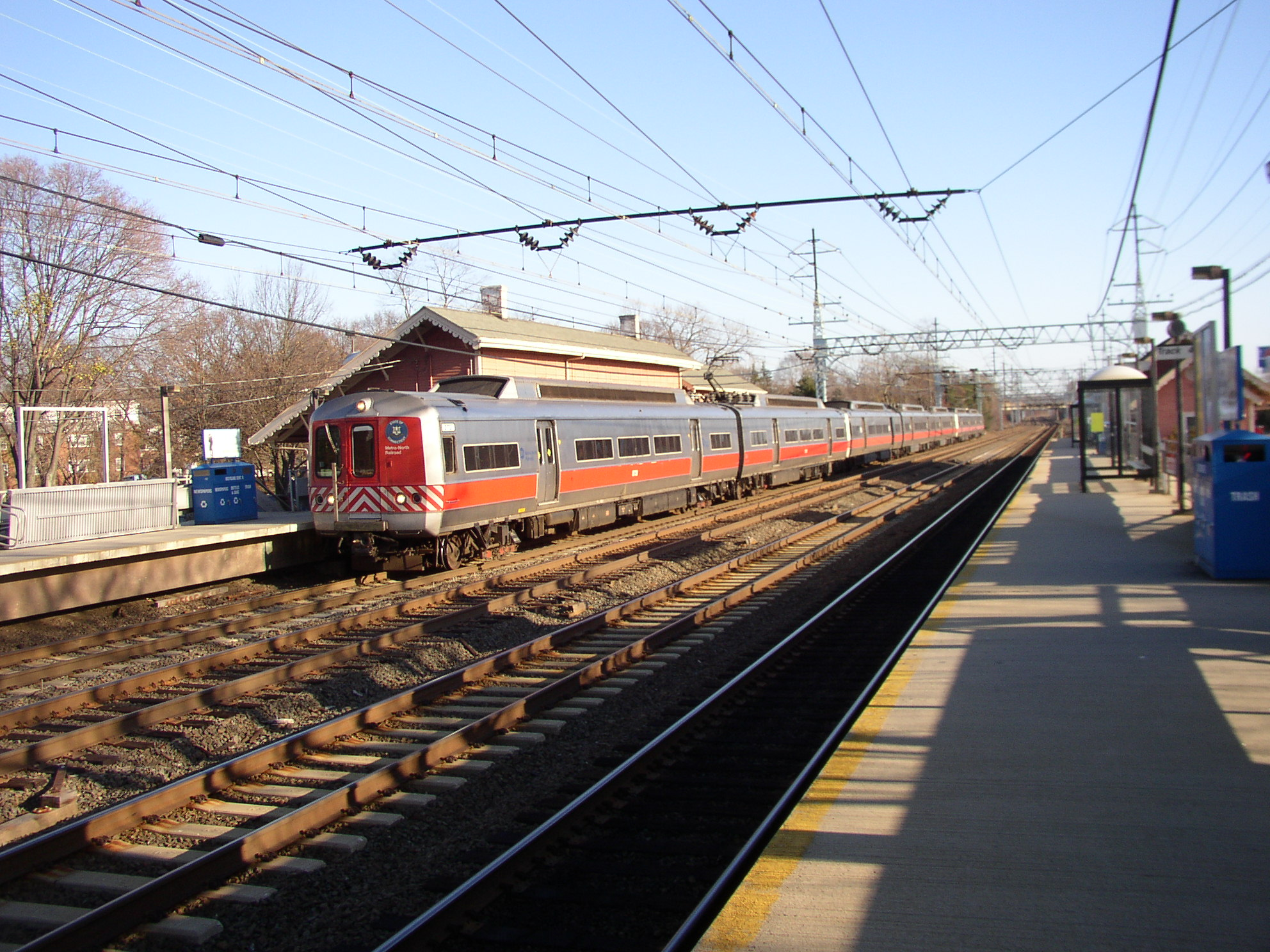
Metro-North New Haven Line train at Stratford station

=== Air ===
Although owned by the City of Bridgeport, Sikorsky Memorial Airport is located in Stratford. The 800-acre (3.2 km^{2}) facility includes two paved runways (both under 4800 feet), a helipad, and two hangars. It provides helicopter service to New York and the Downtown Manhattan Heliport and is used as a landing site for blimps and small aircraft. In 2019, 155 aircraft were based at the airport, with an average of 136 operations per day.

=== Rail ===
Stratford (Metro-North station) is a stop on the New Haven Line, 59 miles (95 km) east of Grand Central Terminal. Average travel time into Manhattan, New York is about 90 minutes. The station platforms are only long enough to handle four cars and the station has limited parking for fewer than 300 vehicles. It has three ticket machines, a bus connection to neighboring Bridgeport, and handicapped access.

=== Roads ===
Stratford is served by several major highways including Interstate 95 (Connecticut Turnpike), U.S. Route 1 (Boston Post Road) (Boston Avenue and Barnum Avenue), the Merritt Parkway (Route 15), Route 108 (Nichols Avenue and King Street), Route 110 (East Main Street and River Road), Route 113 (Lordship Boulevard and Main Street), and Route 130 (Stratford Avenue and Ferry Boulevard).

==== Interstate 95 toll booths ====
In January 1983 a truck slammed into a line of cars waiting to pay a toll on Interstate 95 in Stratford, killing seven people. The accident was one of the reasons toll booths were removed throughout the state.

== Government ==
Stratford town vote by party in presidential elections
Year	Democratic	Republican	Third Parties
2024	58.54% 15,708	40.29% 10,812	1.17% 314
2020	61.58% 17,363	37.30% 10,516	1.12% 315
2016	54.37% 13,729	41.72% 10,534	3.91% 988
2012	58.54% 13,483	40.48% 9,324	0.99% 227
2008	58.29% 14,626	40.65% 10,199	1.06% 265
2004	49.42% 12,057	48.97% 11,945	1.61% 393
2000	54.36% 12,310	40.41% 9,152	5.23% 1,184
1996	50.21% 11,148	36.10% 8,015	13.69% 3,040
1992	36.60% 9,796	40.77% 10,914	22.63% 6,059
1988	41.94% 10,346	56.95% 14,048	1.10% 272
1984	33.76% 8,814	65.78% 17,174	0.47% 122
1980	36.69% 9,187	53.87% 13,489	9.44% 2,363
1976	43.57% 10,885	55.67% 13,908	0.75% 188
1972	32.05% 8,012	65.23% 16,304	2.72% 680
1968	41.54% 9,815	49.34% 11,659	9.12% 2,155
1964	58.10% 13,465	41.90% 9,710	0.00% 0
1960	50.30% 11,590	49.70% 11,452	0.00% 0
1956	28.64% 5,728	71.36% 14,271	0.00% 0

The Town of Stratford operated under a council-manager government from 1921 until 2005 when it changed to a mayor-council type of government. The first mayor, James Miron, was elected in November 2005 to a four-year term. The second mayor was John Harkins. The town has a ten-member town council, elected by district to two-year terms. It appoints one of its members to serve as chairman. The mayor and the council are responsible for setting policy through the enactment of ordinances and resolutions. The mayor is David Chess (D).

=== List of mayors ===
List of mayors since 2005.

No.	Name (Birth–Death)	Term of office		Political party
1	James Miron	December 2005	2009	Democratic Party
2	John Harkins	2009	2017	Republican Party
3	Laura Hoydick	2017	2025	Republican Party
4	David Chess	2025	Incumbent	Democratic Party

== Emergency services ==
=== Emergency medical services ===
Established in 1977, Stratford Emergency Medical Service (SEMS) is the state-licensed, third-service, advanced life support (paramedic) and basic life support, municipal EMS provider to the Town of Stratford. The department responds to approximately 8500 calls annually.[22]

=== Fire department ===
Established in 1909, the fire department operates out of four stations located throughout the town. The fire department staffs four engine companies, a truck company, a rescue unit, and a shift commander along with several specialized response units. The department responds to approximately 6000 calls annually.

=== Police department ===
Created in 1917, the Stratford Police Department has a force of 98 officers. The department's units include arson investigation, crime prevention, a identification & forensic unit, and narcotics & vice. Stratford also has a boat patrol, a K-9 unit, and an animal control unit.

== Education ==
=== Public education ===
Public education in Stratford is managed by the Stratford Board of Education, which operates 13 schools: two high schools, two middle schools, and nine elementary schools. The district has about 6,800 students and 1,095 staff including 577 teachers, counselors, and specialists.

==== High schools ====
- Frank Scott Bunnell High School
- Stratford High School
- A.L.P.H.A. (formerly S.A.F.E.), an alternative high school program of 55 students hosted at the Birdseye Municipal Complex

==== Middle schools ====
- Harry B. Flood Middle School
- David Wooster Middle School

==== Elementary schools ====
- Chapel Street Elementary School
- Franklin Elementary School
- Lordship Elementary School
- Nichols Elementary School
- Second Hill Lane Elementary School
- Stratford Academy: Johnson House (elementary) (3–6)
- Eli Whitney Elementary School
- Victoria Soto Elementary School
- Wilcoxson Elementary School

=== Private education ===
Stratford has two private (Catholic) elementary and middle schools:

- St. James School (K–8)
- St. Mark School (K–8)

=== Higher education ===
- The Connecticut School of Broadcasting maintains a location in Stratford and certifies students in television anchoring, commercial radio performance, and journalism.
- Porter and Chester Institute's main campus provides training programs in automotive technology, CAD, electronics, HVAC, medical assistance, and other trades.
- The Stratford School for Aviation Maintenance Technicians is located at Sikorsky Memorial Airport.

== Local attractions ==
=== National Helicopter Museum ===
Located in the former Stratford railroad station, the National Helicopter Museum contains a photographic history of the helicopter and model helicopters. Notably, it displays the Lycoming T53 jet engine, designed by Dr. Anselm Franz and manufactured at the Stratford Army Engine Plant.

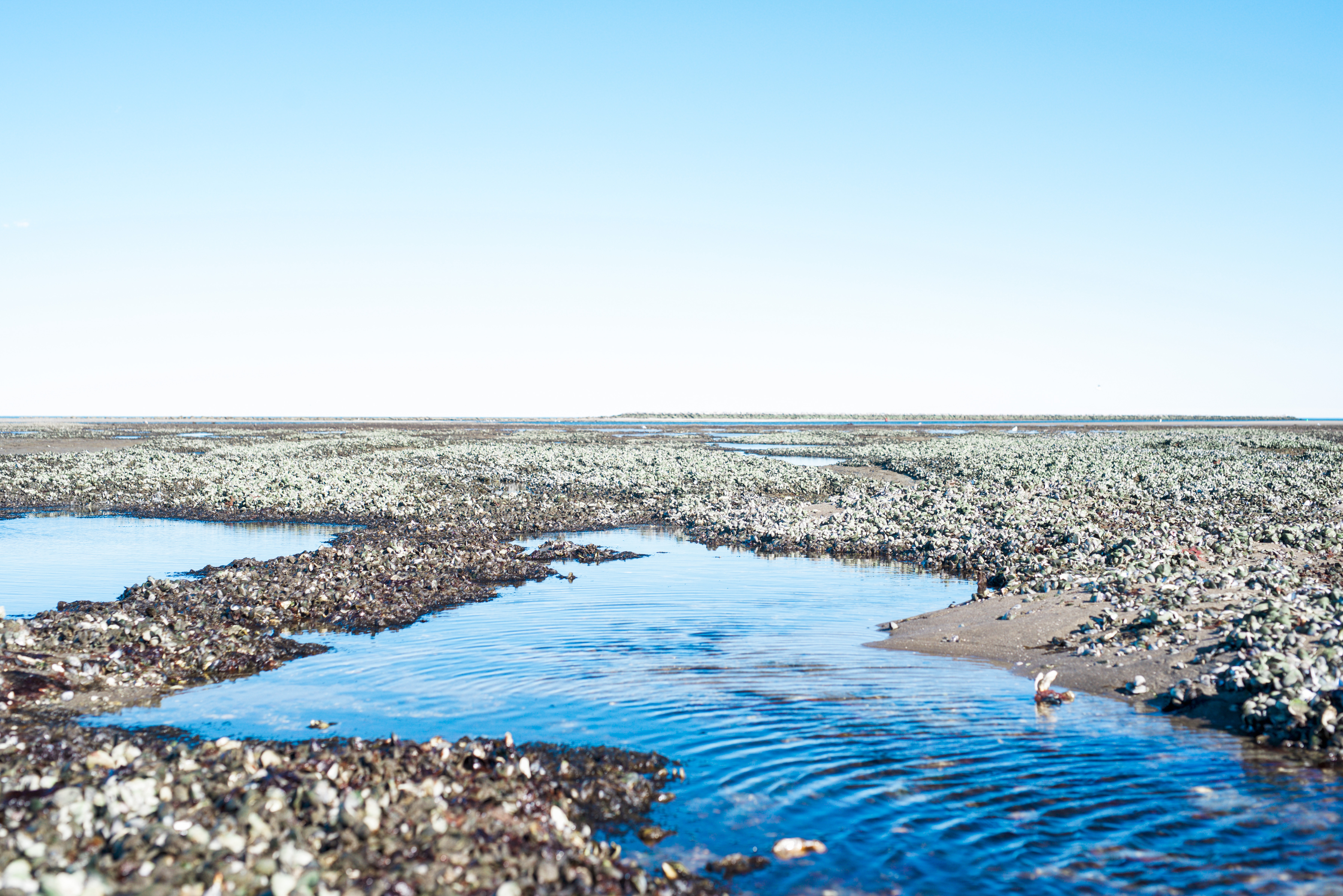
Oysters at low tide; Short Beach is open from sunrise to sunset

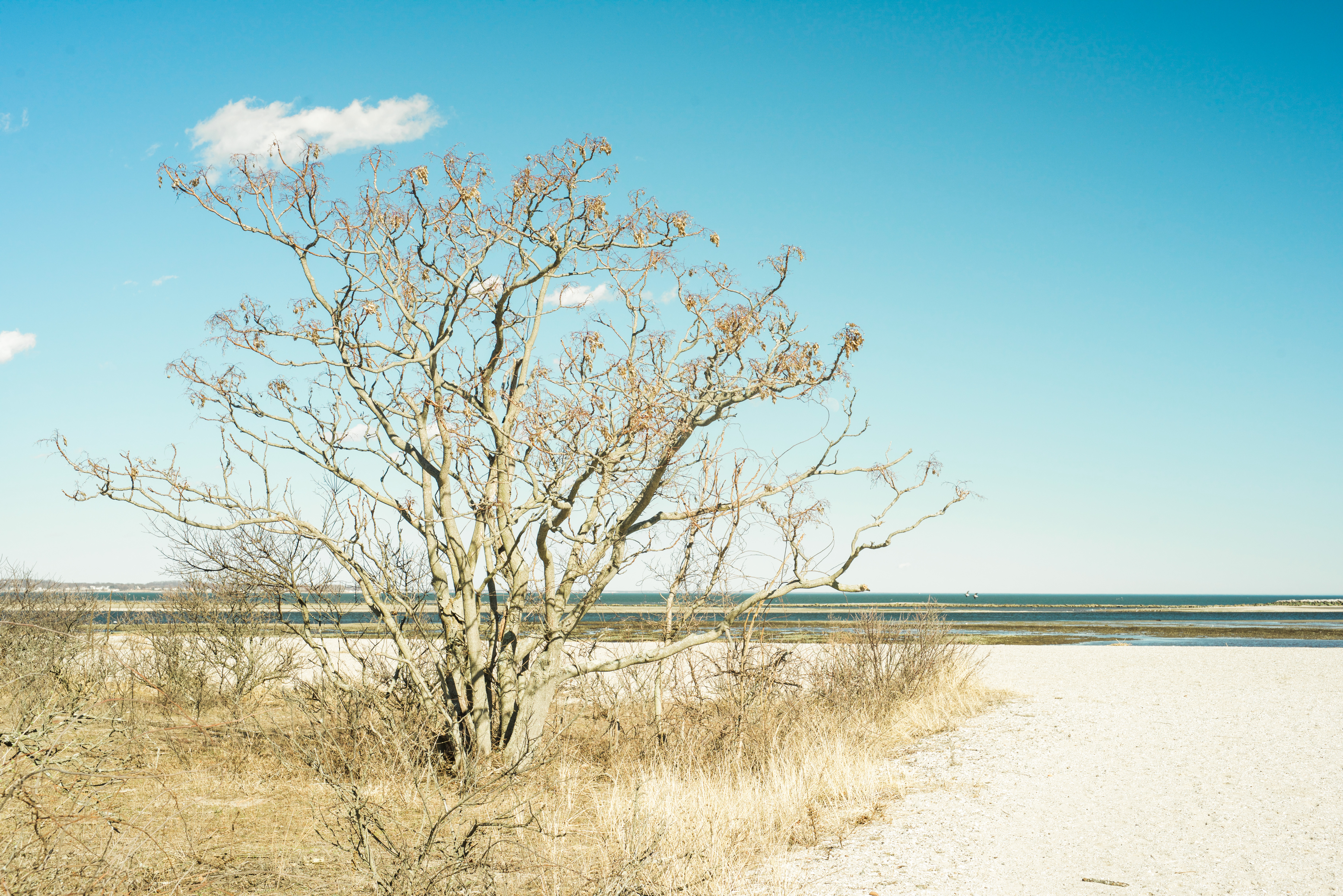
A tree on Short Beach in Stratford, Connecticut

=== Boothe Memorial Park ===
The 30-acre (120,000 m^{2}) Boothe homestead in the Putney area of Stratford is a rolling parkland containing the original Boothe homestead and an eclectic assortment of buildings collected by the Boothe brothers during their lives and added to by the Friends of Boothe.

A tollbooth that was in service from 1940 to 1988 on Connecticut's Merritt Parkway is on display in Boothe Memorial Park.

=== Shakespeare Festival Theatre ===
In 1955 Stratford became home to the American Shakespeare Theatre, an 1,100-seat theater with grounds on the Housatonic River. The theater featured noteworthy actors including Katharine Hepburn, James Earl Jones, Paul Newman, Jessica Tandy, Jane Alexander, Hal Holbrook, Roddy McDowall, Nina Foch, and Will Geer. John Houseman served as its artistic director during the late 1950s.

The company operating the theater ceased operations in the mid-1980s, and the building has been vacant since then. In February 2005, the Town of Stratford received the deed for the Stratford Festival Shakespeare Theater from the state of Connecticut. In 2006 it selected a New York City development company to reopen the theater as a tourist destination, but the company's contract was terminated in July 2007 because of lack of progress. In 2019 the theatre burned to the ground.

=== Stratford Library Shakespeare ===
Since 2002, the Hudson Shakespeare Company has presented an annual showing of their Shakespeare in the Park in the amphitheater behind the Stratford Library.

=== Sites on the National Register of Historic Places ===
- Boothe Homestead (1985)
- Capt. David Judson House (1973)
- Ephraim Wheeler House (1992)
- Isaac Lewis House (1991)
- Nathan B. Booth House (1992)
- Sterling Homestead (1976)
- Stratford Center Historic District (1983)
- Stratford Point Light (1990), a lighthouse
- Washington Bridge (2004)

=== Sterling House ===
Since 1932, Sterling House has served as a community center for Stratford. Housed in a donated 1886 Romanesque mansion that was previously the home of John William Sterling, it hosts recreational and leisure activities for adults and children, charity events, and volunteer activities. The grounds include a gazebo, a rose garden, and a 2-acre (8,100 m^{2}) field.

== Sports ==
Stratford is home to the Connecticut Brakettes women's fastpitch softball team. Formed in 1947 as the Raybestos Girl All-Stars, and later called the Raybestos Brakettes, they became known as the Stratford Brakettes in 1985 after Raybestos ceased its sponsorship. The team has posted 3,242 victories in 3,607 games played, as well as three world championships and 28 national A.S.A. (USA Softball) championships including a record eight consecutive titles from 1971 to 1978. They captured three consecutive titles in 2002, 2003, and 2004. Their most recent title was in 2006. There are 19 former members in the National Softball Hall of Fame and 11 have been Olympians. The Brakettes play at Frank DeLuca Hall of Fame Field.

== Media ==
=== Movies filmed in Stratford ===
Movies filmed at least partially in Stratford:

- Butterfield Eight (1960)
- The Battle (2001)
- Carnauba: A Son's Memoir (2001)
- Zero Day (2003)
- Das Kraftei – Raketenjäger ME 163 Komet (2004)
- Boxes (2005), a short film, not to be confused with Boxes (2007)
- Store (2006)
- Listen to Your Heart (2009)
- All Good Things (2010)
- Daddy for Lunch (2010)
- Sketchy Future (2010)
- Sicarii (2011)
- Chang Can Dunk (2023)

=== Newspapers ===
Stratford is served by Bridgeport's daily Connecticut Post and by the weekly digital Stratford Crier. The Stratford Star ceased publication in 2012.

== Sister cities ==
Stratford has five sister cities:

- Stratford-upon-Avon, Warwickshire, England, United Kingdom
- Stratford, New Zealand
- Stratford, Victoria, Australia
- Stratford, Ontario, Canada
- Stratford, Prince Edward Island, Canada

== Notable people ==
- Andrew Adams (1736–1797), jurist, Connecticut delegate to the Continental Congress, state chief justice and signer of the Articles of Confederation, born in Stratford
- Raymond E. Baldwin (1893–1986), Stratford Town Court Prosecutor and Judge, United States Senator, and 72nd and 74th Governor of Connecticut
- Nathan Bangs (1778–1862), Methodist minister and second president of Wesleyan University in Middletown, Connecticut
- William Beardsley (1605–1661), town founder buried in Stratford
- Adam Blakeman (1596–1665), Puritan leader who was a town founder and the first church minister
- Tyler Bunch, puppeteer and actor
- Efrain Chacurian, member of the National Soccer Hall of Fame in Oneonta, New York
- Javier Colon, singer-songwriter, winner of season one of The Voice, grew up in Stratford and graduated from Bunnell High School in the city
- Joseph Platt Cooke (1730–1816), Continental Army colonel in the Revolutionary War, state politician, and twice a delegate to the Continental Congress, born in Stratford
- Vera Curtis (1880–1962), soprano
- Tony Dovolani, ballroom dancer, cast member on Dancing with the Stars, formerly lived in Stratford
- Anselm Franz (1900–1994), Austrian engineer, inventor of the Jumo 004 and T53 turbine engines
- Bancroft Gherardi (1832–1903), United States Navy rear admiral and veteran of the Mexican–American War and American Civil War
- Joseph Hawley (1603–1690), town recorder, representative, shipbuilder and yeoman
- William Samuel Johnson (1727–1819), signer of the United States Constitution, first senator for Connecticut, first president of Columbia University, born and died in Stratford
- Stephen King, author, briefly lived in Stratford as a child
- George Ayres Leavitt (1822–1888), early New York City publisher, lived in Stratford part-time
- Nancy Marchand (1928–2000), actress (Lou Grant, The Sopranos), resided in the Lordship section of Stratford
- Moby, songwriter-musician-singer, lived in Stratford (1974–1976), attending Birdseye Elementary School
- Kenneth H. Olsen, engineer and co-founder of Digital Equipment Corporation
- Tom Penders, college basketball coach and ESPN sports analyst, native of Stratford
- David Plant (1783–1851), member of the United States House of Representatives for the 20th Congress, Lieutenant Governor of Connecticut 1823–1827
- Igor Sikorsky, founder of Sikorsky Aircraft
- Loring Smith (1890–1981), Broadway and motion picture actor born in Stratford
- Victoria Leigh Soto (1985–2012), school teacher; attended Stratford High School and lived in Stratford; victim of the Sandy Hook Elementary School shooting; buried at the Union Cemetery in Stratford
- John William Sterling (1844–1918), philanthropist, corporate attorney, and major benefactor of Yale University in New Haven, Connecticut
- Kenneth Tigar, actor and translator
- Gideon Tomlinson (1780–1854), noted lawyer, member of the United States House of Representatives (16th through 19th Congresses), Senator for Connecticut (22nd through 24th Congresses), and 25th Governor of Connecticut, born and interned in Stratford
- David Wooster, Major General in the American Revolutionary War, born in Stratford
- John Zaffis, paranormal investigator on the Syfy original series Haunted Collector
