= History of Trumbull, Connecticut =

A state historic marker in Trumbull, Connecticut

Trumbull, a town in Fairfield County, Connecticut, in the New England region of the United States, was originally home to the Golden Hill Paugussett Indian Nation, and was colonized by the English during the Great Migration of the 1630s as a part of the coastal settlement of Stratford.

In May 1725, the northwest farmers of Stratford petitioned the Colony of Connecticut to establish their own separate village. They proposed calling their new village Nickol's Farms, after the family that owned a large farm in its center, but in October 1725 the new parish was named Unity.

In 1744, Unity merged with the Long Hill parish (organized in 1740) of the Stratfield section of Stratford to form the Society of North Stratford. North Stratford controlled its own religious and educational affairs. However, to have a voice in governmental functions such as adopting laws and establishing taxes, the inhabitants were required to attend town meetings in Stratford, an overnight journey for some.

After ten years of unsuccessful petitions, the Connecticut General Assembly granted complete town rights in October 1797. The new town was named for George Washington's staunch supporter, Revolutionary War governor, patriot, statesman, reportedly an owner of one slave, and merchant Jonathan Trumbull (1710–1785).

== Historical overview ==
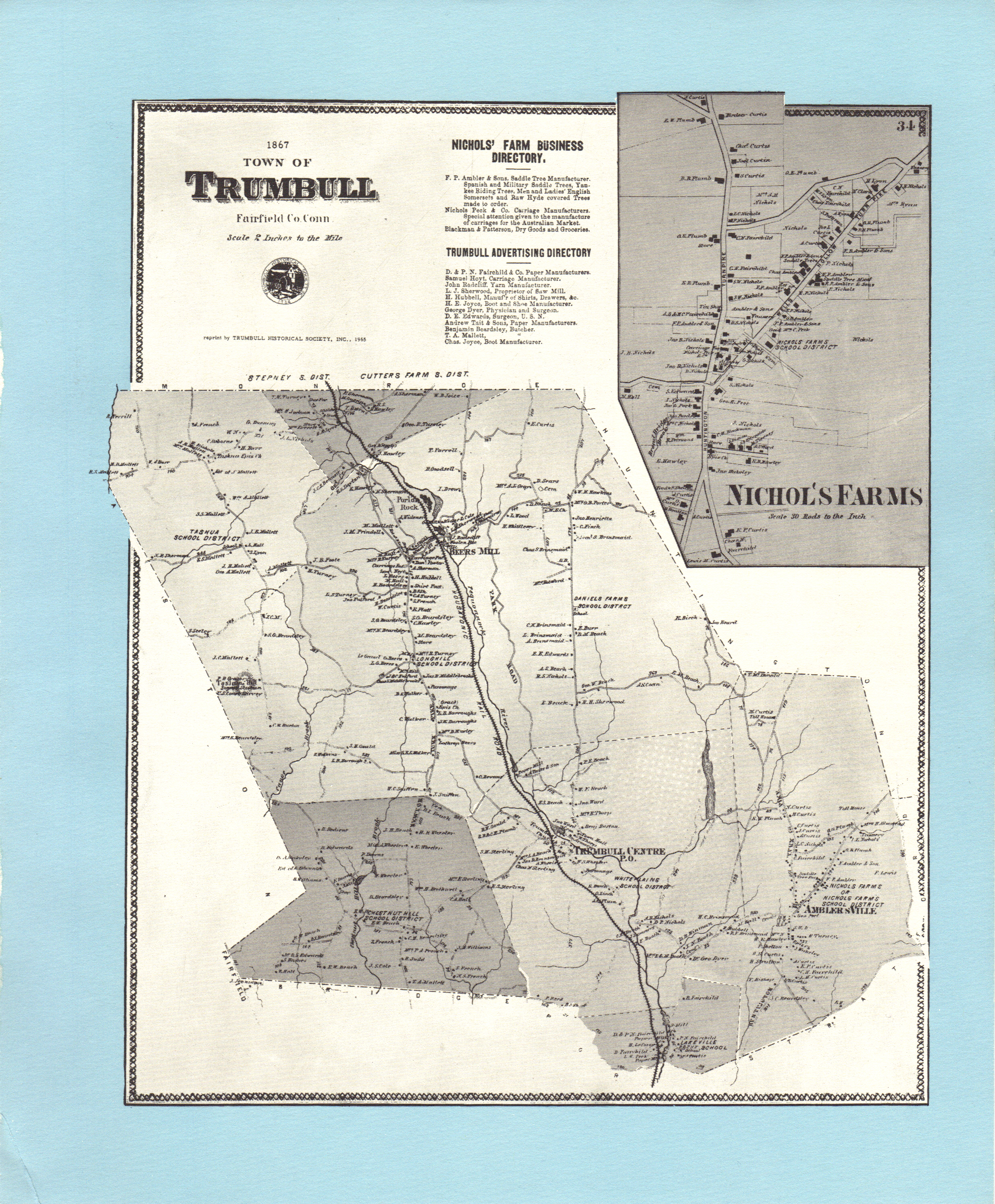
Beers 1867 map of Trumbull, Connecticut

=== Native Americans ===
The Golden Hill Paugussett Indian Nation occupied the territory of Trumbull as a self-sustaining community for thousands of years before the arrival of the English in the late 1630s. The Indian Nation lived along the banks of the Pequonnock River in the Pequonnock River Valley and also around the natural lake first called Mischa Lake, after the Indian chief who resided there, and now known as Pinewood Lake.

After twelve to fifteen years had passed, the Stratford settlement had grown so much in size that the displaced Indian Nation began to ask for compensation for land north of an east-to-west line 6 miles (9.7 km) north of Long Island Sound. This line was located within the present-day village of Nichols, Mischa Hill, Pinewood Lake and White Plains areas. The original Stratford proprietors agreed and began to make several purchases from the Indians in the 1650s. However, relations between the English and the Indians became strained throughout the Colony of Connecticut as settlements continued to grow and displace the Native Americans.

In 1652, the Court at the Colony of Connecticut ordered that no Indian could walk near an Englishman's house either in town or at his farm on the Sabbath without being fined or imprisoned. In 1656, it was ordered that no one in the Colony of Connecticut could sell an Indian a horse or mare or any boat or boat rigging without suffering a penalty of 5 to 1. The tribe maintains a small reservation in the Nichols section of Trumbull that is considered to be the oldest continuing reservation in Connecticut and the smallest in the US.

=== Colonial era ===
==== Founding and Puritan era ====
Trumbull was originally settled as a part of Cupheag, the Pequannock word for "harbor", a coastal settlement established in 1639 by Puritan leader Reverend Adam Blakeman (pronounced Blackman), William Beardsley and either 16 families—according to legend—or approximately 35 families—suggested by later research—who had recently arrived in Connecticut from England seeking religious freedom. The main village and stockade was built where the Housatonic River flows into Long Island Sound. In 1643, the settlement changed its name to Stratford either in honor of William Beardsley who came from Stratford-upon-Avon, birthplace of William Shakespeare, or for Stratford-le-Bow, England.

Stratford is one of many towns in the northeastern American colonies founded as part of the Great Migration in the 1630s when Puritan families fled an increasingly polarized England in the decade before the civil war between Charles I and Parliament (led by Oliver Cromwell). Some of the Stratford settlers were from families who had first moved from England to the Netherlands to seek religious freedom, like their predecessors on the Mayflower, and decided to come to the New World when their children began to adopt the Dutch culture and language.

Like other Puritan towns founded during this time, early Stratford was a place where church leadership and town leadership were both united under the pastor of the church, in this case Reverend Blakeman. The goal of these communities was to create perfect outposts of religious idealism where the wilderness would separate them from the interference of kings, parliaments, or any other secular authority.

By the mid-1650s, the Golden Hill Paugussett Indian Nation began to petition the Court of the Colony of Connecticut for compensation for lost territory taken by the encroaching English settlement. This legal action led the court to set the town boundary on May 15, 1656, to include all of the territory 12 miles (19 km) inland from Long Island Sound between the Housatonic River and the Fairfield town line, including all of Trumbull.

The English continued to purchase territory from the Native Americans, entering the deeds of transfer into the land records. However, the first volume of such records has been lost. It took Lt. Joseph Judson, Joseph Hawley and John Minor until April 1662 to secure the last written deed of transfer from the Paugussett Indian Nation for the western part of the town of Trumbull, referred to as the Long Hill purchase. This deed references that it was lying west of the land they had already purchased.

==== Town formation and settlement patterns ====
In 1661, the town voted to allow each inhabitant to take up a whole division of common land anywhere in the woods where they could find fit planting ground as long as it was not within 2 miles (3.2 km) of the town meeting house, and they were prohibited from making it their dwelling place without the consent of a committee or the town selectmen. Elder Phillip Groves, Captain William Curtiss and Lt. Joseph Judson, early farmers in Trumbull, were named to a committee to lay out the land as they saw fit.

In 1668, according to the town records, there were only five families recorded as "outlivers", or living beyond two miles from the Stratford meetinghouse. However, by the 1670s, after numerous individuals were encouraged to and had received permission to dwell outside of the two-mile limit, the Stratford selectmen stopped recording outlivers altogether.

In 1670, the "three mile" or "woods division" was made. This divided common land located 3 miles (4.8 km) from the Stratford meeting house and included land up to 6 miles (9.7 km) away from it. The common land grants were laid out in a fashion so that each tract had a share of a run of water, woods, natural meadow, plains, swamp and ledge. The grants were often a quarter of a mile north to south and one mile in length east to west, about 170 acres (69 ha) of land. Each freeman received division land according to his right or rank in the township, and many exchanged or sold their grant after receiving it.

In spring of 1680, the town decided to lay out all undivided common land within 6 miles (9.7 km) of the meeting house. This area would have included the southern third of Trumbull. In 1685, some families filed complaints at the court at the Colony of Connecticut at Hartford saying they were not receiving their land grants from the woods division in a timely manner. Therefore, the court ordered the town to apportion all common land located between two and six miles from the Stratford meeting house, which included all the territory in the lower third of Trumbull. The division of the common land in Trumbull took until 1800 to complete entirely.

==== Subsections ====
===== Woodbury =====
In the 1660s, Lt. Joseph Judson had a disagreement with the majority of elders in Stratford as he tried to introduce the Half-Way Covenant, and this led to a major rift which lasted for many years and split the town. In 1671, Judson received permission from then-Governor John Winthrop, Jr. to create a new town called Woodbury 25 miles (40 km) inland. Judson and Reverend Walker left Stratford with a dozen other families and moved to the newly created town, abandoning their farms in the Trumbull area of Stratford. Judson and Walker died in Woodbury in 1690 and 1699 respectively.

Joseph Judson and many others had established their farms in Trumbull decades before leaving for Woodbury in 1671. These farms were not sold initially, but were just physically abandoned and were referred to in the land records as Old Farms. Some of the other families to remove to Woodbury, abandoning their farms in Trumbull, were Caleb Nichols, Abraham's father, who removed to Woodbury and died there in 1690, and John Curtiss, who gifted his entire farm in the woods on "Misha [sic] Hill" (Trumbull) to his son Benjamin in 1688 and removed to Woodbury. In a deed recorded at Stratford in 1710, Sgt. John Curtiss, "of Woodbury", sold 4 acres (0.016 km^{2}) to Abraham Nichols that was located "near the place called and known by the name of Lt. Joseph Judson's Farm."

===== Nichols =====
It is not known exactly when the first settlers began to clear land and establish farms in the area, due to the fact that the first volume of Stratford's land records was destroyed around 1650. The first settlements were doubtless made soon after the settlement of the mother-town of Stratford in 1639. By 1658, Lt. Joseph Judson, Jeremiah Judson and Joseph Curtiss became freemen by the court of the Colony of Connecticut and established farms there. A freeman had to own real property in their own name before they could be elected as freemen.

The area now called Nichols, located in southeastern Trumbull, was first called Mischa Hill in the land records for the Native American who lived there. In the late 1660s, it was commonly called Lt. Joseph Judson's Farm, or Judson's Farm, after the owner of the largest farm on its hilltop. After Judson and others removed to establish the town of Woodbury in 1672 and abandoned their farms on Mischa Hill, it was called Old Farms. In the early 1700s, it was called Nickol's Farms, then in 1725 it became a part of Unity and in 1744, North Stratford. During the mid-1800s, the area was called Amblersville after the principal manufacturer in the center of the village.

It has been said that Abraham Nichols made the first permanent settlement within Trumbull around 1690 or 1700, depending on the source, and then other families subsequently ventured into the wilderness to establish mills, churches, and schools. Nichols' landholdings were said to total 3,000 acres (12 km^{2}). However, there is no documentation to support these claims.

According to Walter Nicholls, who wrote the History of the Nichols family in 1909, Abraham did not accompany his father to Woodbury in 1673, but remained in Trumbull to oversee the plantation. However, since Abraham was only eleven at the time (born 1662), it is likely that he did remove to Woodbury with his family and returned to Trumbull between 1696 and 1700. Walter Nicholls' imaginative description of the Nichols homestead was:

About 1700 Abraham Nicholls erected for himself a homestead upon his lordly domain, and which, according to the description vouchsafed by persons now living, who chanced to view it while yet standing in the early part of the nineteenth century, was an immense gambrel-roofed structure of a rambling style of architecture, situated upon an eminence, affording an unobstructed vista of the surrounding landscape and at the southward, about four miles distant, the shimmering bosom of Long Island Sound. There it stood for decades, without a neighboring habitation within a circuit of several miles; while the sepulchral quietude of its surroundings was rarely broken, even by the echo of a sound adequate to dispel the day dreams, or waken the nocturnal slumbers of its peaceful inhabitants, save that of the casual lowing of kine, the appealing cadence of the whop-poor-will at nightfall, or the grewsome howling of wolves.... It is a subject of profound regret on the part of many of the descendents of Abraham Nicholls that neither his will nor the inventory of his estate can be found of record.

The land records show that Abraham Nichols' holdings were actually around 285 acres (1.15 km^{2}) of land, of which around 55 acres (0.22 km^{2}) remains as open space today. Nichols bought or exchanged land to acquire several farms and large parcels of land beginning in 1696. He exchanged land with the son of, then deceased, Lt. Joseph Judson for 22 acres (0.089 km^{2}) of his old farm which had a barn on it. He purchased 54 acres (0.22 km^{2}), or half the land owned by Jeremiah Judson, and 19 acres (0.077 km^{2}) of land from Benjamin Curtiss. He also purchased Reverend Zachariah Walker's entire farm in 1704, which was 36 acres (0.15 km^{2}) in size. Furthermore, in a deed recorded in 1699, Lt. Ebenezer Curtiss received 15 acres (0.061 km^{2}) of land from the three-mile division that was said to be bounded west with Lt. Joseph Judson's farm, now belonging to Abraham Nichols. All of these transactions are described in the land records as being located at or near the "Old farm", "Judson's farms" or "Lt. Joseph Judson farm". Joseph Judson had removed from Trumbull in the 1670s to settle at Woodbury, where he died in 1690.

Some of Abraham Nichols' farm remained in the Nichols family through four centuries. Florence Nichols, the last of the Nichols line, married George Woods in 1903 and the property was known as the Woods Estate. Soon after their deaths in 1973 and 1972 respectively, the property was deeded from the Woods to the Nichols Methodist Church from whom the town of Trumbull purchased it in 1974. The 13-acre (0.053 km^{2}) Woods homestead was renamed Abraham Nichols Park and is now the home of the Trumbull Historical Society.

=== Agricultural era ===
The first farmers of Stratford resided in the village and went out to their farms, located one to three miles away, to do the work of the farm. The Nichols and White Plains areas were the first to be cultivated and settled within the present-day bounds of Trumbull, due to the fertile soil, spring-fed ponds and natural meadows found there and their proximity to the main village located less than three miles away. In the mid-seventeenth century in the Colony of Connecticut, it was very common for freemen to establish a farm or several farms in the fertile upland or countryside while maintaining a substantial townhouse in the village or even back in England.

==== Early farmers ====
The first individuals to own land in Trumbull were among the original founders of the Stratford settlement, namely Benjamin Beach, Zachariah Bostick (Bostwick), Richard Booth, Ephraim Booth, Paul Brinsmaid, John Curtiss, Benjamin Curtiss, Mr. Joseph Curtiss, Captain William Curtiss (Curtice), Ebenezer Curtiss, Israel Curtiss, Zachariah Curtiss, Joseph Fairchild, Elder Philip Groves (Graves, Grouse), Joseph Hawley, Ephraim Hawley, Captain John Hawley, Samuel Hawley, Edward Hinman, Lt. Joseph Judson, Sgt. Jeremiah Judson, Isaac Judson, John Judson, Thomas Lake, Isaac Nichols, Caleb Nichols, Abraham Nichols, Samuel Ufford (Uffoot) and Reverend Zechariah Walker. The first families to reside permanently in Trumbull were the Beach, Beardsley, Blakeman, Booth, Bostick, Brinsmade, Clarke, Curtiss, Edwards, Fairchild, Hawley, Hinman, Hubbell, Judson, Lake, Lewis, Middlebrook, Nichols, Peet, Plumb, Seeley, Sherwood, Thompson, Uffoot, Walker and Wildman families.

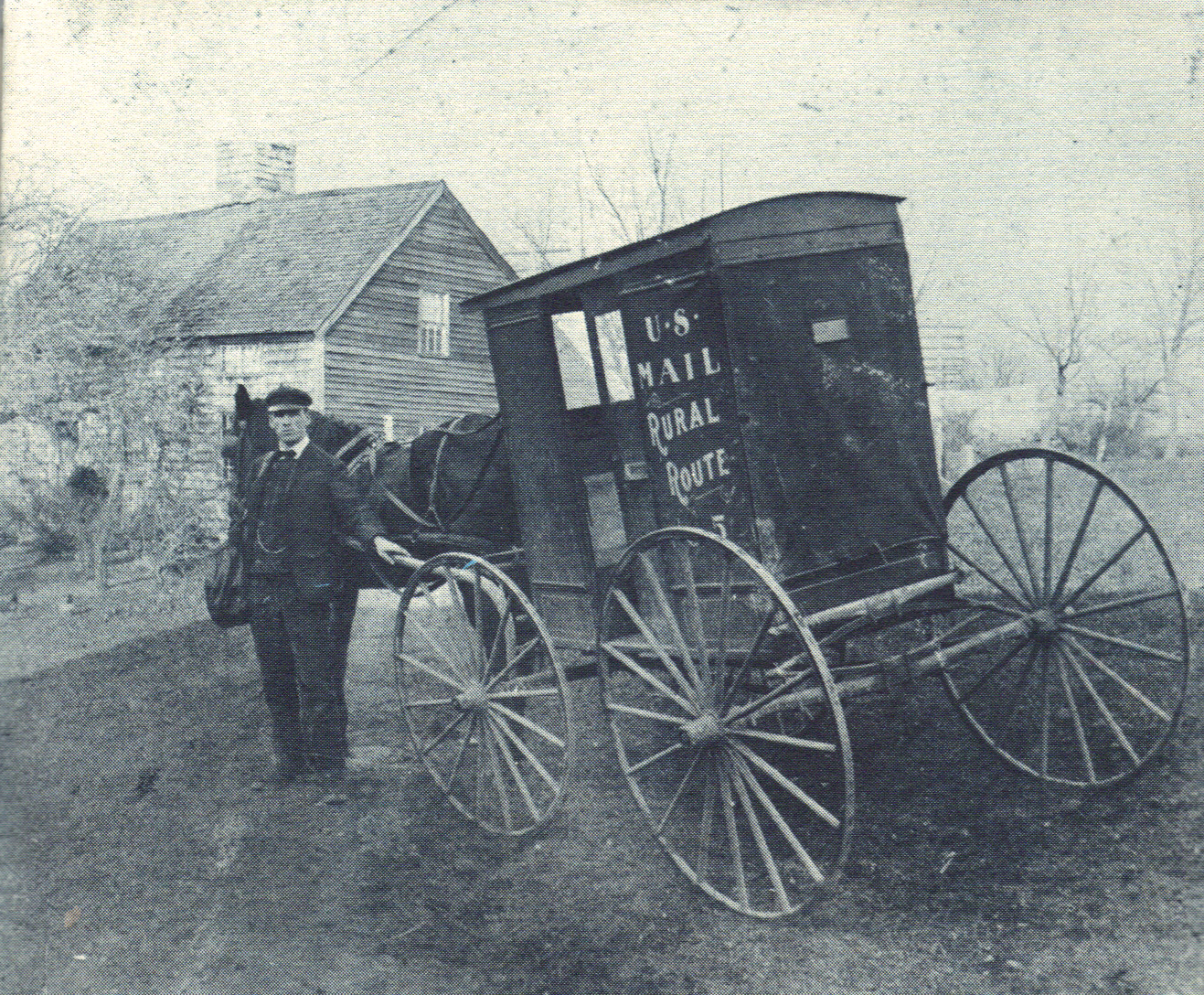
Ephraim Hawley House image before 1881

Before becoming a freeman in 1686, Zachariah Curtiss built a center-chimney farmhouse on the south side of Mischa Hill. His farm was located on land granted to him as a part of the "three-mile division" and part on land gifted to him by his father, Captain William Curtiss, which was described as "lying at Old Farm".

Ephraim Hawley, a slave owner, built his farmhouse immediately south of Zachariah Curtiss, on the south side of Mischa Hill, on the eastern portion of the Hawley land grant, commonly called "ye springs and white plains". To be elected a freeman in the Connecticut Colony at this time, one had to own real property, a dwelling house, in his name. It is presumed that Hawley built his house before becoming a freeman in 1687.

The path or road connecting the Curtiss and Hawley farms on the south side of Mischa Hill to Stratford Village, located 2 1/2-miles to the south, became known as the Farm Highway, present-day Connecticut Route 108. The highway was completed and surveyed to the south side of Mischa Hill, at "Zachariah Curtiss, his land" and at Captain's Farm, in 1696, making it one of the oldest documented English highways in Connecticut.

=== American Revolution ===
In 1773, Robert Hawley was named Captain of the North Stratford or Second Train Band established in 1706. His grandfather, Captain John Hawley, was its first captain. At a special meeting held at the North Stratford meeting house on November 10, 1777, Hawley was also appointed to a committee to provide immediately all those necessaries for the Continental soldiers.

On March 12, 1778, the parish of North Stratford raised money and over 200 pounds (91 kg) of cheese and gammon for those residents, including two slaves, Nero Hawley and Caesar Edwards, and thirteen other residents serving in the southern army in Captain Beebe's Company, Huntington's Brigade, 2nd Connecticut Regiment, stationed at Valley Forge under the command of General George Washington.

Huldah Hawley was born in 1755 and died in 1856 at the age of 101. The widow of Chauncey Beardsley, Huldah took pleasure in talking of the exciting times of the Revolution and related during her lifetime about the time that two companies of French soldiers, under the command of French General Rochambeau, encamped a whole winter during the war on what is now known as Mountain Hill, a high rocky bluff in the central part of the village of Nichol's Farms. This high rocky bluff, at the time, commanded a view of Long Island Sound for 70 miles (110 km), and was used to spy on British ships. Hawley said the soldiers ordered her to cook for them, and she furnished them with provisions for fear that they would kill her. French coins have since been found near the site of their camp in Abraham Nichols Park.

In December 1780, two dozen Hussar horsemen deserted and discharged themselves from their winter quarters in Lebanon and fled into the Connecticut woods.

From June 28 until June 30, 1781, during the American Revolutionary War, units of the French army, called Lauzun's Legion or Hussars, encamped in North Stratford, now Trumbull. The Legion was commanded by Colonel Armand Louis de Gontaut-Biron, duc de Lauzun, and marched 15 miles (24 km) to the south to protect the flank of the main French army encamped in Newtown. The army was marching in the Washington–Rochambeau Revolutionary Route south to reinforce American troops under the command of General George Washington at the Siege of Yorktown.

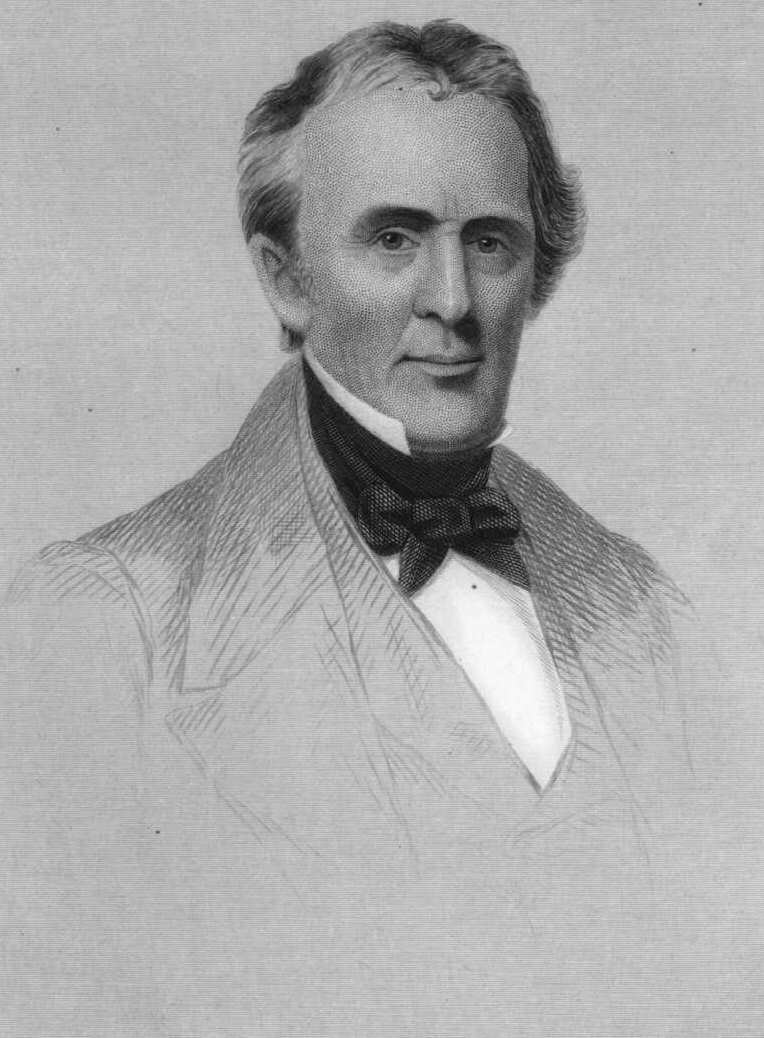
Benjamin Silliman

Benjamin Silliman was born in the Eliakim Beach tavern, built by mill owner Ebenezer Hawley in 1765, a few months after his mother Mary (Fish) Silliman (widow of John Noyes) fled from their Fairfield home to escape 2,000 invading British troops ordered to burn Fairfield. The British forces had taken Silliman's father, General Gold Selleck Silliman, prisoner in May 1779.

A Great Jubilee Day to commemorate the end of major fighting in the Revolutionary War was held on May 26, 1783, at the grounds of the North Stratford meeting house. This celebration included feasting, prayer, speeches, toasts, and two companies of militia performing maneuvers with cannon discharges.

=== American Civil War ===
During the American Civil War, Company C of the 8th Connecticut Infantry Regiment of the Connecticut National Guard was formed in Trumbull under the command of Capt. Charles E. Plumb and was disbanded in 1871 after the war ended.

== Municipal development ==
Trumbull National Guard Unit Co. C 8th Regt. CNG, Capt. Charles E. Plumb Commanding, c. 1867. Gristmill in background built by Gideon and Ephraim Hawley c. 1722 White Plains, Trumbull

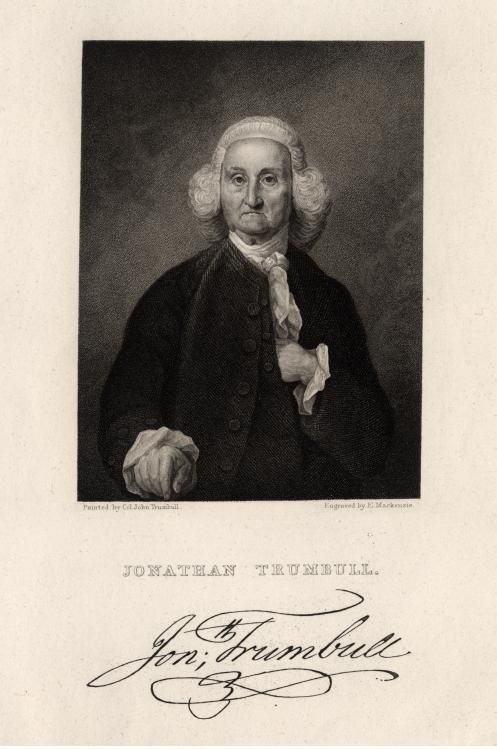
Jonathan Trumbull

In May 1725, the farmers of northwest Stratford at Nickol's Farms, desiring to have their own meeting house, asked for permission to form their own parish or village. The legislature approved their application in October 1725 and named the new village "Unity". The Unity Congregational Church was established in 1730. The Reverend James Beebe was the parish leader from 1747 to 1785. The Unity Burial Ground still exists, its last burial being in 1935.

In May 1740, upon the petition of Jonathan Edwards, the farmers gathered at Stratfield's winter parish on Long Hill and were granted their own individual parish and funding for education by the legislature.

In 1744, Unity parish and the Long Hill parish of the Stratfield section of Stratford asked permission to combine and become the Society of North Stratford. The General Assembly referred to the eastern boundaries of Unity, at the time, as "ancient" when they approved the new town called North Stratford in 1744. North Stratford remained as a village under the control of the town of Stratford for a period of 53 years until it became a part of the town of Trumbull in 1797.

After the Revolutionary War, citing their well-established population and the inconvenient distance to attend town meetings in Stratford, they petitioned the Connecticut General Assembly for status as an incorporated town. After several denials, the legislature granted their petition in October 1797. On November 20, 1797, the first town meeting was held. The new town was named for Jonathan Trumbull, Connecticut governor during the Revolutionary War and a valued adviser to George Washington, who respectfully referred to him as "Brother Jonathan".

== Society and religion ==
=== Religious burial grounds ===
==== Unity Burial Ground ====
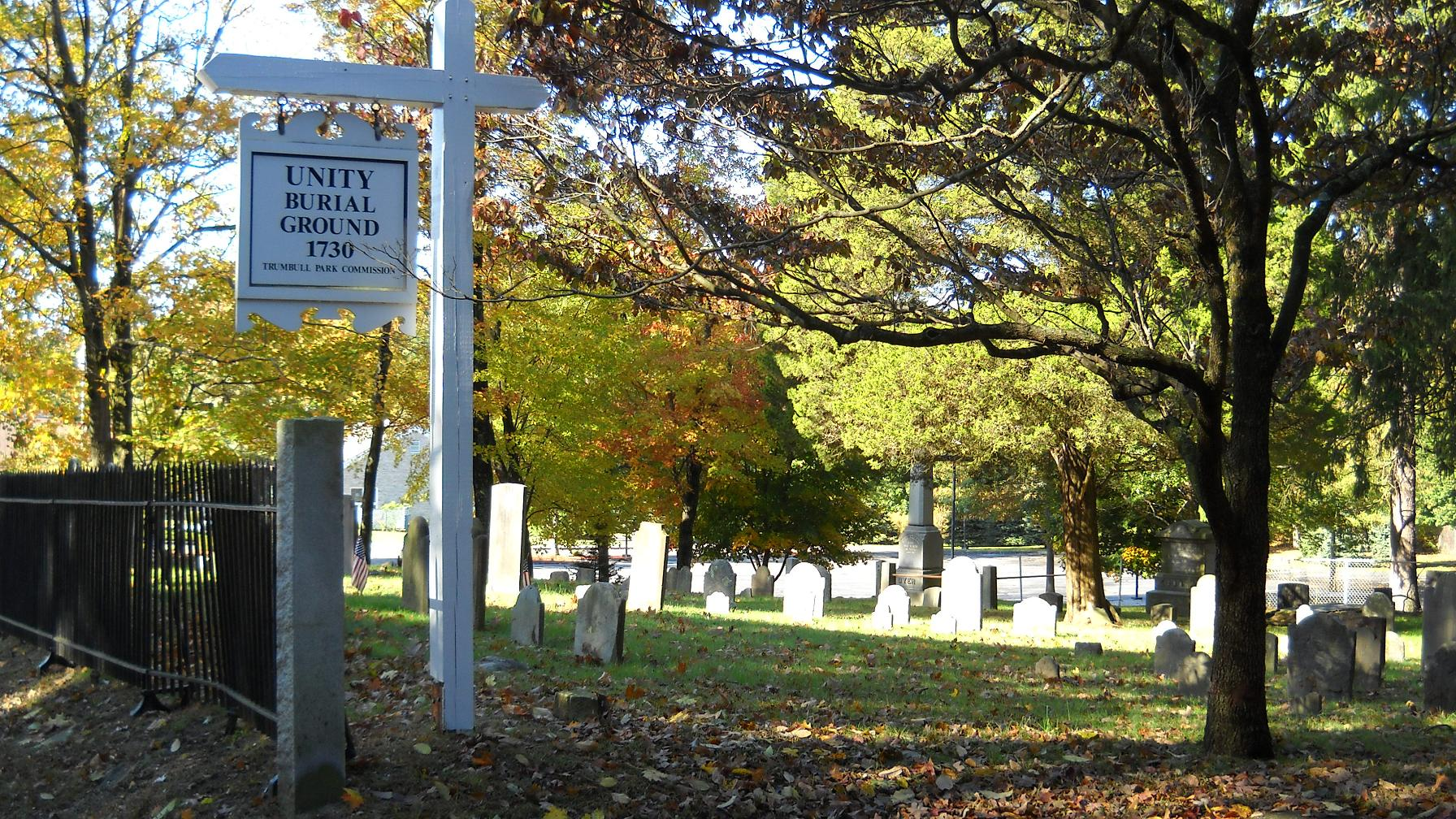
Unity Burial Ground established 1730

The Unity Burial Ground is a historic graveyard located on the southeast end of White Plain a few rods north of the site of the first meeting house that was built in the parish of Unity. The cemetery was laid out in 1730, and the first burial was that of 7-year-old Samuel Bennitt on June 21, 1731. There are over 110 gravestones and 90 unmarked field stones.

==== Christ Episcopal Church and Tashua Burial Ground ====
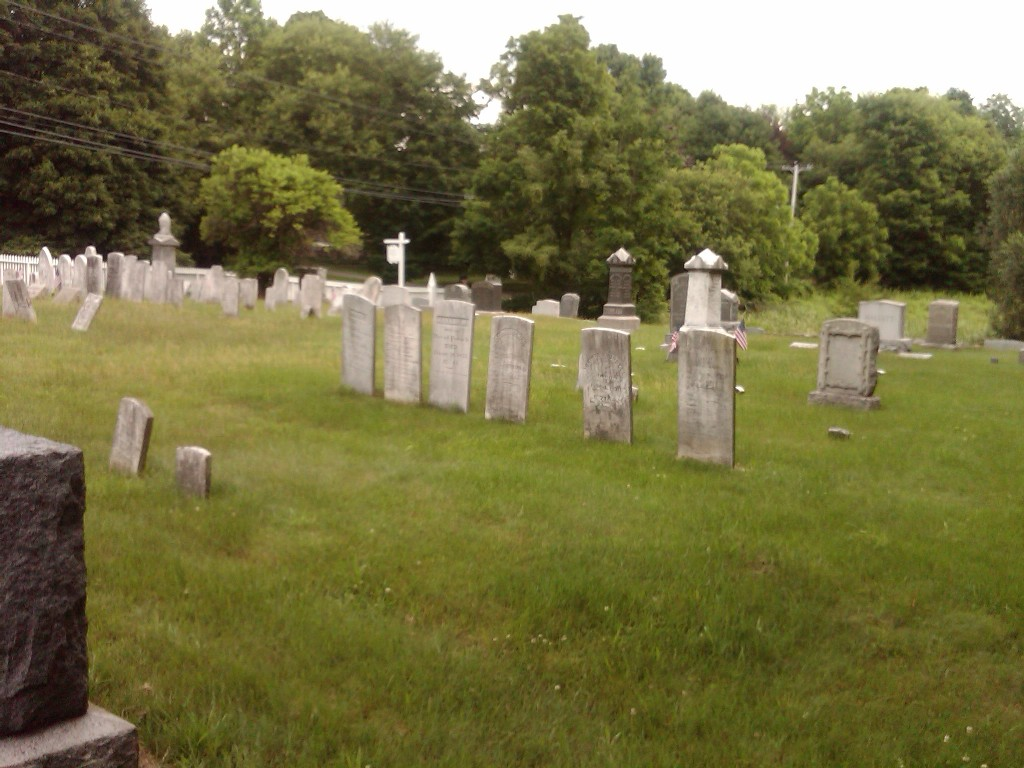
Tashua Burial Ground established 1766

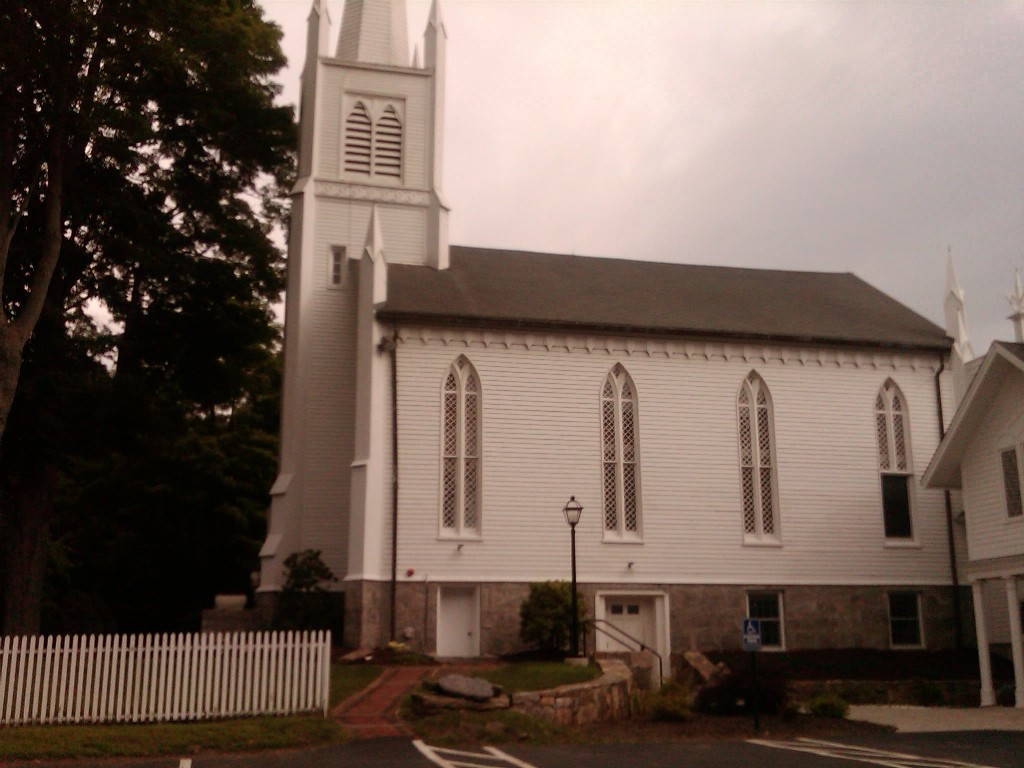
Christ Episcopal Church today

Christ Episcopal Church and Tashua Burial Ground is a historic site including an Episcopal Church building and cemetery at 5170 Madison Avenue in the Tashua section of Trumbull. The site was founded in 1760 and added to the National Register of Historic Places in 2001. Two prior churches had been on the site before the cornerstone of the existing church was laid in 1826. This building is believed to have been designed by Alexander Jackson Davis and was consecrated in 1847. The original church was a 36-by-26-foot (11.0 by 7.9 m) structure and stood at the north end of the graveyard. The second, larger church was built across from the first and consecrated in 1795 after the first church was abandoned five years earlier.

The current church is an example of Carpenter Gothic, a variant of Neo-Gothic architecture. Christ Church displays the original Bible and Book of Common Prayer that was received by the church in 1762 from England. The church is still active, with two services held on Sunday mornings. The graveyard on the site dates to 1766, and includes 241 plots.

==== Gregory's Four Corners Burial Ground ====
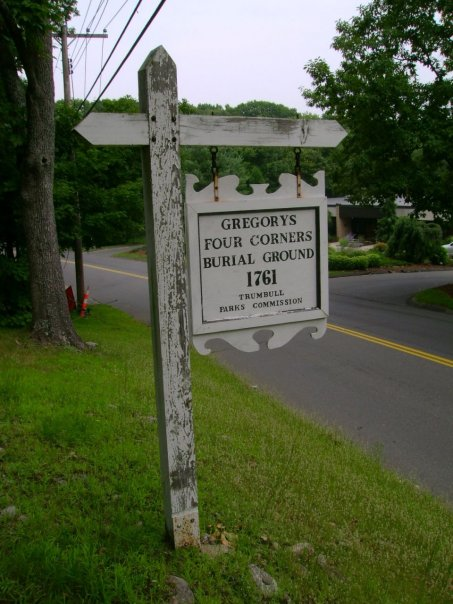
Gregory's Four Corners Burial Ground established 1761

Gregory's Four Corners Burial Ground is a historic cemetery just over the Monroe town line. It was established in 1761. It is most famous for being the final resting place of Hannah Cranna, often called the "Wicked Witch of Monroe".

== Pine Brook Country Club ==
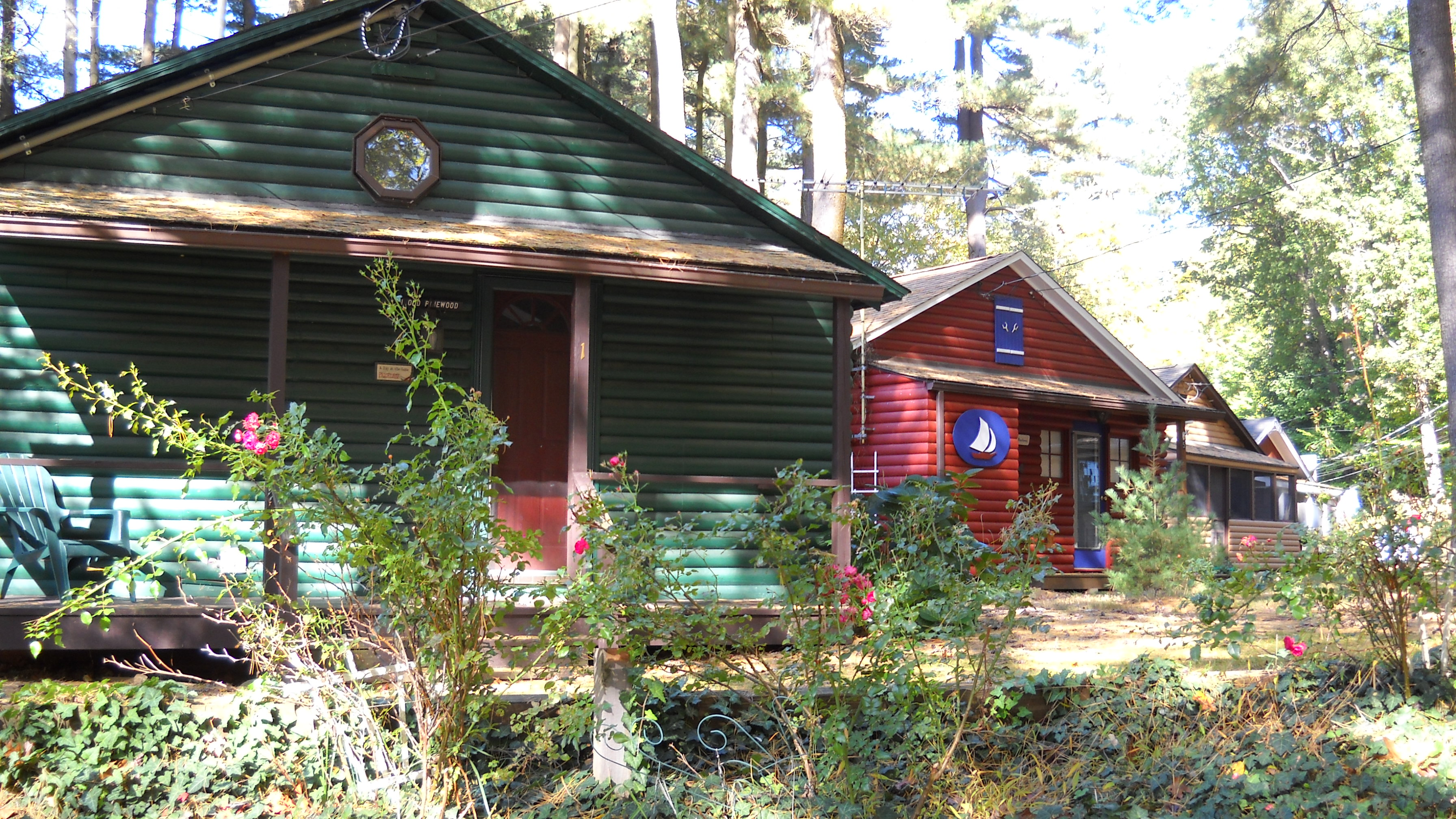
Original Pine Brook Country Club cabins c. 1931

Benjamin Plotkin purchased Pinewood Lake and the surrounding acreage and built forty cabins and an auditorium with a revolving stage and incorporated as the Pine Brook Country Club in 1930. Plotkin's dream was to market the club as a summer resort for people to stay and enjoy theatrical productions. Pine Brook is best known for becoming the summer rehearsal headquarters of the most important experiment in the history of American theatre. The Group Theatre was formed in New York City by Harold Clurman, Cheryl Crawford and Lee Strasberg in 1931. The group was made up of actors, directors, playwrights and producers and produced works by the most important American playwrights of the time on real-life subject matter, changing stage and film forever. In 1944, Pine Brook Country Club was sold, reorganized and chartered as the Pinewood Lake Association.

== Commerce and industry ==
=== Roads ===
==== Farm Highway ====
On December 7, 1696, the Farm Highway, present-day Nichols Avenue (Connecticut Route 108), was laid out by the Stratford selectmen to the south side of Mischa Hill. The highway was 12 rods wide, or 198 feet (60 m), where Broadbridge Brook runs off the south side of Mischa Hill, at Zachariah Curtiss, his land, and at Captain's Farm. Broadbridge Brook runs off Mischa Hill west of the present-day intersection of Route 108 and the Merritt Parkway and flows southwesterly to Broadbridge Avenue in Stratford.

The "Captain" the town recorder was referring to may have been Captain Joseph Hawley or Captain William Curtiss, who was captain of the first Train Band and owned a farm at Turkey Hill at this time. This hill was located two miles from the meeting house, along the Farm Highway, on the way to Mischa Hill. The hill was also commonly called Second Hill, Good Hill and Grassy Hill as well. The Captain could have also been John Hawley, who owned the Ephraim Hawley House at this time, which bordered on Zachariah Curtiss' farm. Hawley was captain of the Second or North Train Band and was Justice of the Peace for Fairfield County.

In October 1725, when the Assembly of the Connecticut Colony approved the Parish of Unity, they referred to the Farm Highway as Nickol's Farms Road. The Nichols Avenue portion of Route 108 in Trumbull is considered to be the third-oldest documented highway in Connecticut after the Mohegan Road, Connecticut Route 32 in Norwich (1670), and the King's Highway or Boston Post Road (1673), now U.S. Route 1.

==== White Plains Road ====
In February 1694, Thomas Lake purchased land on the east side of the natural grassy flood plains of the Pequonnock River near an area called The Falls. By 1705 White Plains Road, present-day Route 127, was laid out northerly past Lake's house to a natural rock outcropping called Pulpit Rock. Pulpit Rock is located north of the present-day intersection of White Plains Road and Unity Road. The first meetings of the Trumbull Congregational Church, established in 1730 as the Parish of Unity, were held at Pulpit Rock on White Plains Road. This church also served as a town meeting house until 1747 when a new church was built under the leadership of Rev. James Beebee.

==== Merritt Parkway ====
The Merritt Parkway was built directly through Trumbull in the late 1930s. Trumbull has the distinction of harboring the youngest original Parkway underpass (Frenchtown Road), built in 1942, and the oldest Parkway overpass (at White Plains Road), built in 1934. Constructed of reinforced concrete and encased steel-girder design at a cost of $47,532. It was financed by NRA grants and Connecticut Highway Department funds, the White Plains Road Overpass is not a typical Parkway structure. It was designed prior to the Parkway concept being adopted in 1934 and reflects the newer state highway bridges seen throughout Connecticut during the early 1930s.

Upon completion of the Merritt, George Dunkelberger, the designer of all sixty-nine original bridges, was asked to sketch a bird's-eye view of a Parkway scene he particularly enjoyed. He chose the Park Avenue Underpass in Trumbull with the Sport Hill Road Underpass and Morehouse Highway Underpass in the distance. The sketch, with Park Avenue as a focal point, was used on the cover of the 1940 Highway Commissioner's Biennial Report. The Park Avenue Underpass was also used to symbolize the Parkway on the state of Connecticut's Anniversary Plate issued in 1943.

=== Industries ===
==== Mills ====
At the August 1697 town meeting, John Seeley first proposed building a gristmill at the "narrows" of the Pequonnock River southward of Eassays Pond, but it took until July 1704 to come to terms with the town and finish construction.

On January 26, 1703, the Stratford selectmen granted Ebeneezer Curtiss, James Lewis and Edmund Lewis, county surveyor, permission to erect a sawmill near Mischa Hill.

In December 1709, Captain Judson and Captain Coe agreed to build a dam at the Falls of the Pequonnock River as long as they maintained a mill or mills at the location and they satisfy all persons for land drowned by said dam.

In January 1722, Gideon and Ephraim Hawley agreed to rebuild a mill or mills on the stream of the Pequonnock River at the narrows by White Plain.

Reuben Fairchild and his brothers Daniel and Eben built the Fairchild Paper Mill in 1826 at a place commonly called since 1674 as the Falls of the Pequonnock River. They were guided in their endeavors by Andrew Tait who had learned the art of papermaking in Scotland. Fairchild Paper Mill was the first mill to make white note paper. The company also ran a boarding house for its female employees. The mill stood to the west of White Plains Road near what is today the entrance to Fairchild Memorial Park. As of 2010, it is the town boundary with the city of Bridgeport and has been made into Fairchild Park. Pequonnock in the Paugussett Indian language meant "place of slaughter" or "place of destruction".

==== Mines ====
The first mention of minerals at Saganawamps, or the Old Mine Park Archeological Site, is found in the February 21, 1757, deed giving Howkins Nichols of Stratford a lease for 200 years of five acres "at a place commonly called Saganawam for obtaining ye ore or mineral substances." Some time around 1818, Ephraim Lane took some samples of rocks he found at Saganawamps to Yale University Professor Benjamin Silliman for identification. Silliman reported, in his new American Journal of Science, that he had identified tungsten, tellurium, topaz and fluorite. In 1837 the first (and at the time only) prismatic barite ore of tungsten in the United States was discovered at the mine.

==== Manufacturing ====
Reuben Fairchild, son of Lewis and Mary (Ufoot) Fairchild, married Anna, daughter of Robert Hawley in 1813. He was a cabinet maker by trade and lived his entire life at Nichols Farms where he and his brother Eben commenced the manufacture of saddletrees on a large scale around 1810. In May 1817, they purchased a building and moved their business to Wall Street Bridgeport, Connecticut.

George R. Nichols embarked with his brother David Stiles Nichols in the manufacture of coaches during the 1840s, their business being mostly with Texas and the Southern states. David S. Nichols was succeeded by James K. Nichols, a brother of George K. Nichols. The firm of Nichols and Brother encountered heavy losses during the Civil War. Before the war, Mr. George K. Nichols, who had successfully conducted a carriage repository on Broadway in New York, in the interest of the firm, had to return to Nichols' Farms to help supply the demand for carriages from the South. The Mexican coaches made by the firm were of high repute. After the Civil War, Australia was a major market for the company's carriages.

Harvey Hubbell, like his contemporaries Edison, Ford and Westinghouse, contributed to both spheres of progress, new product design and manufacturing innovation. The first Harvey Hubbell, father of the company's founder, was a partner in two clothing manufacturing firms in the late nineteenth century. The first factory was located in New York, and the second was started in Trumbull in 1860 in a building located near the Hubbell farm on Main Street in the Long Hill section of Trumbull.

=== Housatonic Railroad ===
From 1840 - 1931, a 15-mile (24 km) segment of the Housatonic Railroad ran along the Pequonnock River with stations at Bridgeport, North Bridgeport (Lyons), Trumbull, Long Hill, Stepney, Pepper (Pepper Crossing) and Botsford, terminating in New Milford, Connecticut. The railroad also maintained the Parlor Rock Amusement Park in Trumbull. The railroad was ripped up and replaced with Connecticut Route 25 up to Trumbull, north of which became the Pequonnock River Valley State Park.

== Education ==
The spirit of public education was fostered early in Trumbull when the selectmen voted on January 11, 1716, to allow the farmers at Long Hill, Fairchilds and Nichols Lakes the use of the forty shillings per thousand allowed by law for seven years ensuing, provided they educate their children according to law.

Five school districts were formed in November 1761. Each district had its own committee, which was appointed regularly and consisted of three persons. The districts were called Nichol's Farm, Daniel's Farm, Long Hill, White Plain and Cutler's Farm, for the area they served. The number was increased slightly in 1762 when Long Hill was split into Upper Long Hill and Lower Long Hill. Tashua School was first noted in 1769.

On December 2, 1795, a meeting was held to set off the eight school districts' new boundaries: Nichol's Farms, White Plain, Daniel's Farm, Booth's Hill, Long Hill South, Long Hill North, Tashua and Mount Moria. The description of the new districts listed landmark houses, roads and geographical locations in the boundary descriptions that included Bears Den, Nichol's Farm Road, the place where Lt. Brinsmade's house once stood, Mischa Hill sawmill, Hedge Hog Brook, Daniel's Farm Road, Luff's Hill, James Daskom's, Widow Sterling's, Widow Beebe's, Booth Hill Brook, Mr. Joseph Nichol's, Mr. Edward Waylon's, Porter's Hill, Shagnawamps Road, Shagnawamps Brook, a large rock by the road between the house of Mr. Joshua Curtiss and Mr. Daniel Foot's, Canoe Brook, Daniel Salmon's, Mr. Seeley Burrough's, Mr. Benjamin Beardslee's, the Weston and Stratfield Parish town lines as well as Mr. Enoch Gregory's, Mr. John Jones, Mr. John Fitch and the Newtown Road.

== On the National Register of Historic Places ==
- Christ Episcopal Church and Tashua Burial Ground – 5170 Madison Avenue (added May 25, 2001)
- David Mallett Jr. House – 420 Tashua Road (added March 20, 1986)
- Kaatz Icehouse – 255 Whitney Avenue (added October 19, 1977)
- Nichols Farms Historic District – Center Road, 1681–1944 Huntington Turnpike, 5–34 Priscilla Place, and 30–172 Shelton Road (added September 20, 1987)
- Old Mine Park Archeological Site (added 1990)

== Demographics ==
Population change in Trumbull during the 19th century
| Year | 1800 | 1810 | 1820 | 1830 | 1840 | 1850 | 1860 | 1870 | 1880 | 1890 |
|---|---|---|---|---|---|---|---|---|---|---|
| Population | 1,291 | 1,241 | 1,232 | 1,242 | 1,204 | 1,309 | 1,474 | 1,335 | 1,323 | 1,453 |

Population change in Trumbull since 1900
| Year | 1900 | 1910 | 1920 | 1930 | 1940 | 1950 | 1960 | 1970 | 1980 | 1990 | 2000 | 2010 |
|---|---|---|---|---|---|---|---|---|---|---|---|---|
| Population | 1,587 | 1,642 | 2,597 | 3,624 | 5,294 | 8,641 | 20,379 | 31,394 | 32,989 | 32,016 | 34,243 | 36,018 |

== Notable residents ==
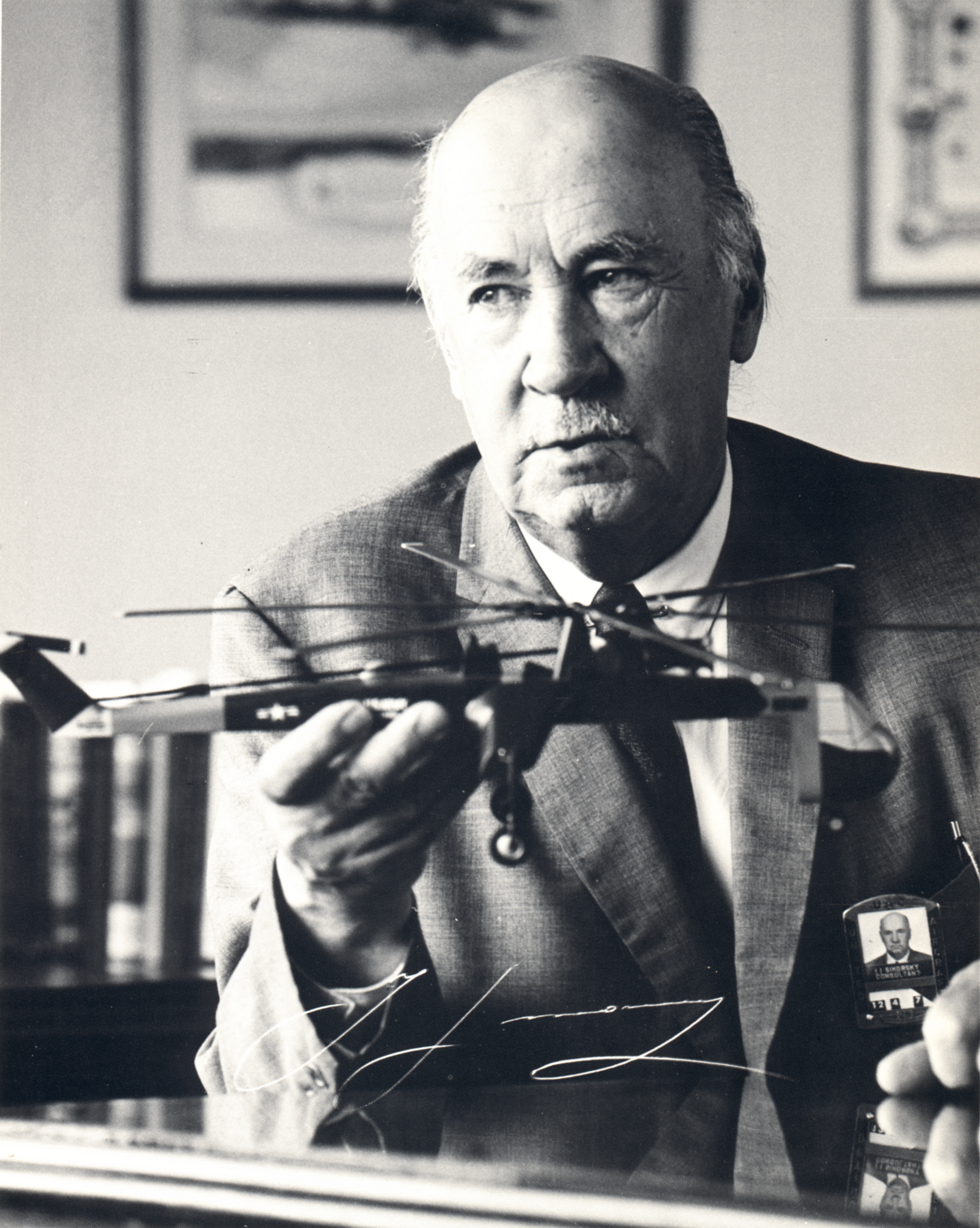
Igor Sikorsky Trumbull resident from 1928 to 1951

Helicopter inventor Igor Sikorsky lived in Trumbull from 1928, after moving his aircraft manufacturing company that bears his name from New York to Stratford, until 1951. The Sikorsky Manufacturing Company became a part of United Aircraft and Transport (now United Technologies Corporation) in July 1929. The company manufactured flying boats, such as the S-42 "Clipper", used by Pan Am for trans-Atlantic flights.

Sikorsky also continued his earlier work on vertical flight. On February 14, 1929, he filed an application to patent a "direct lift" amphibian aircraft which used compressed air to power a direct lift "propeller" and two smaller propellers for thrust. On June 27, 1931, Sikorsky filed for a patent for another "direct lift aircraft", and was awarded patent #1,994,488 on March 19, 1935. His design eventually culminated in the first (tethered) flight of the Vought-Sikorsky VS-300 on September 14, 1939, with the first free flight occurring on May 26, 1940.

Sikorsky's success with the VS-300 led to the R-4, which became the world's first mass-produced helicopter in 1942. Sikorsky's final VS-300 rotor configuration, comprising a single main rotor and a single antitorque tail rotor, has proven to be one of the most popular helicopter configurations, being used in most helicopters produced today.

== Image gallery ==
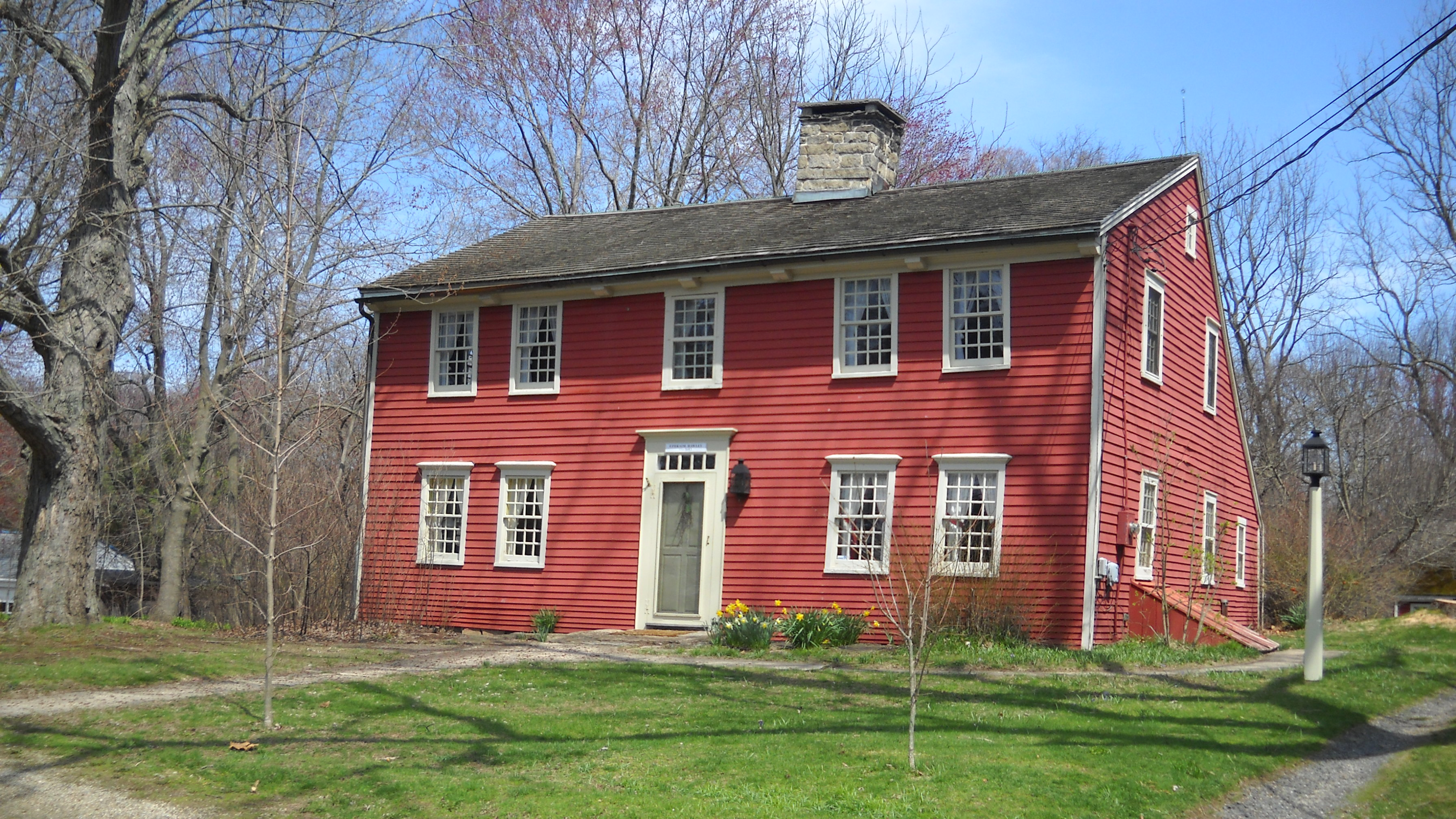
Ephraim Hawley House c. 1683

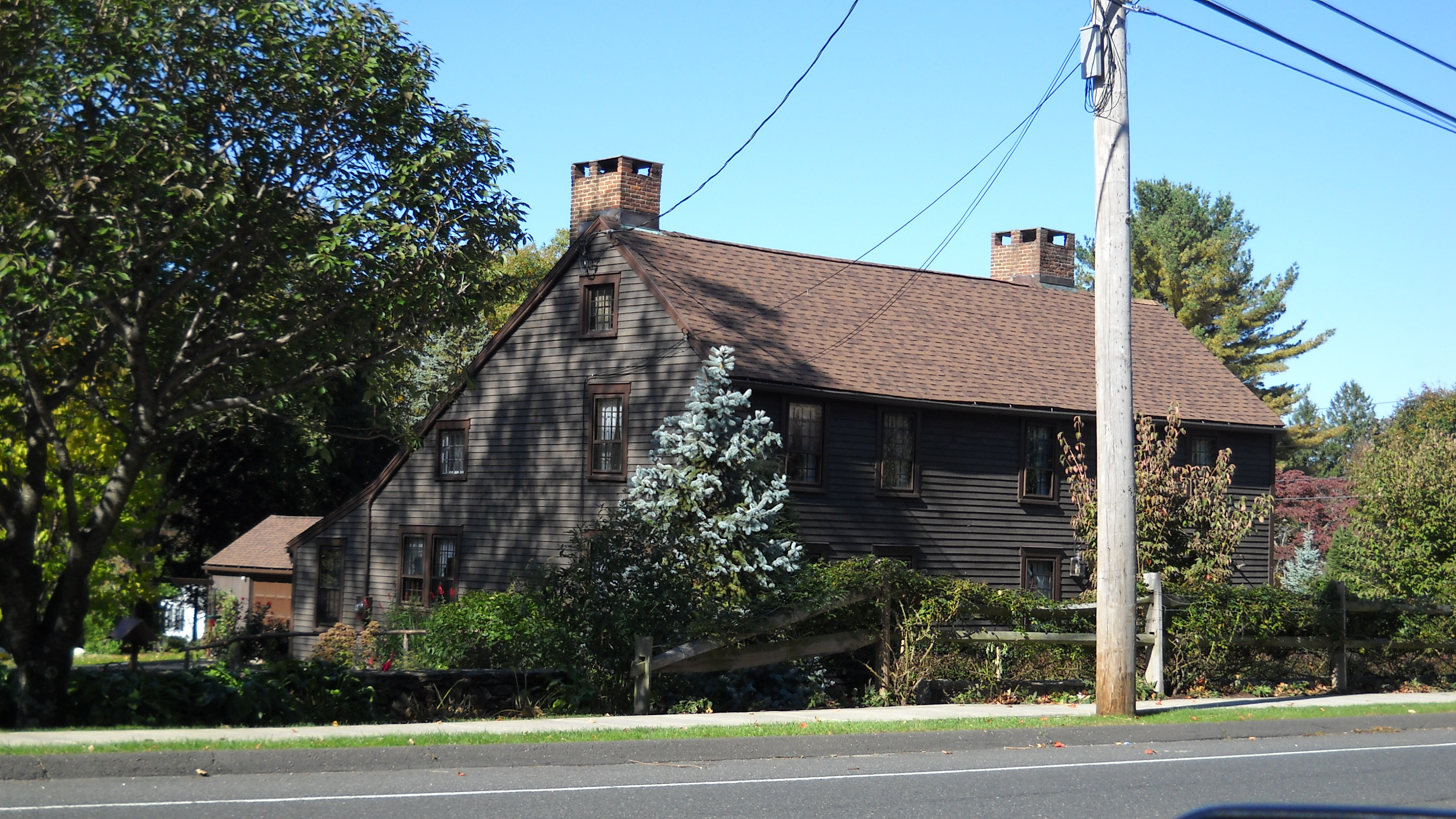
John Wildman House c. 1745

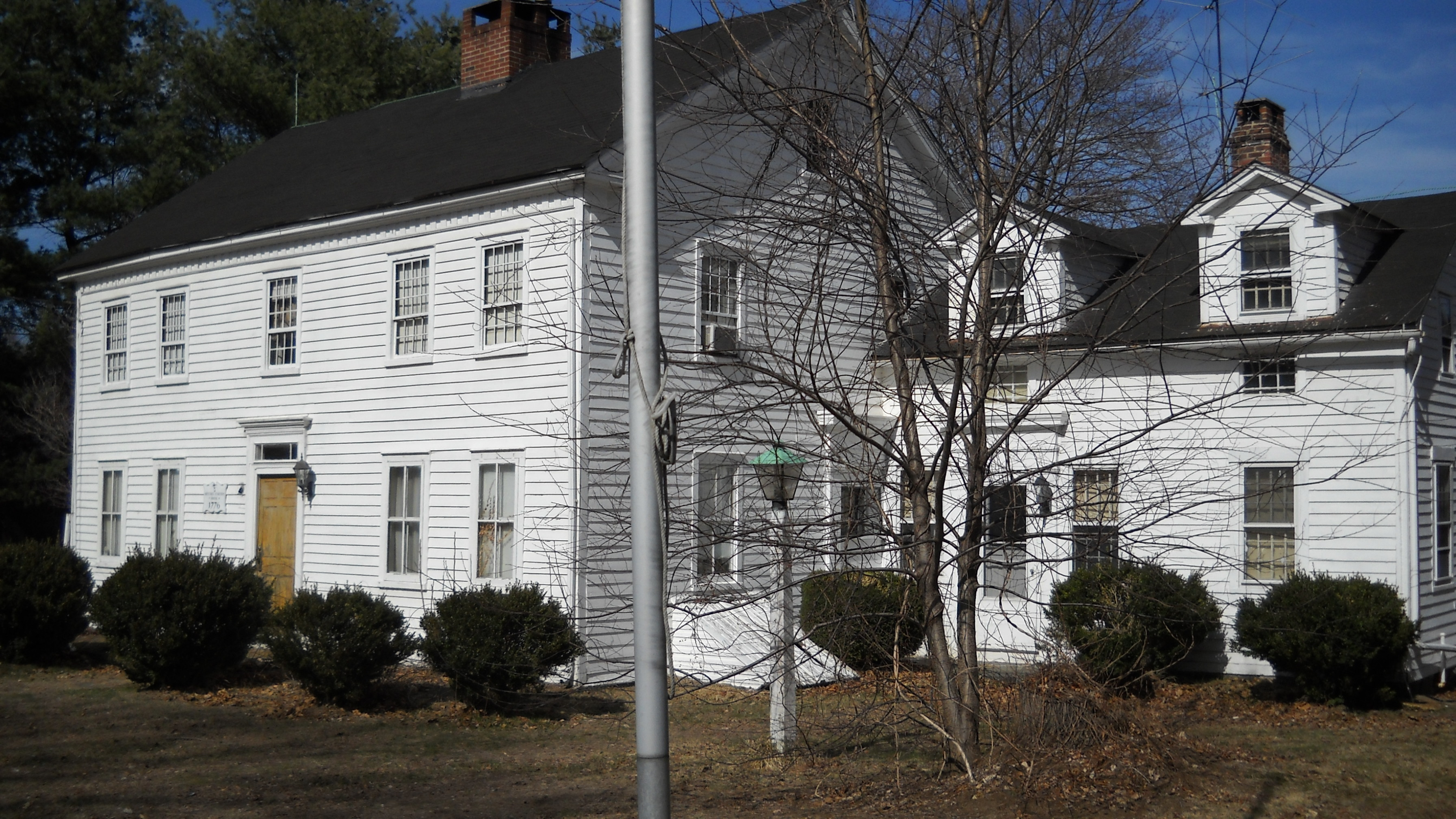
Zachariah Curtiss House c. 1721

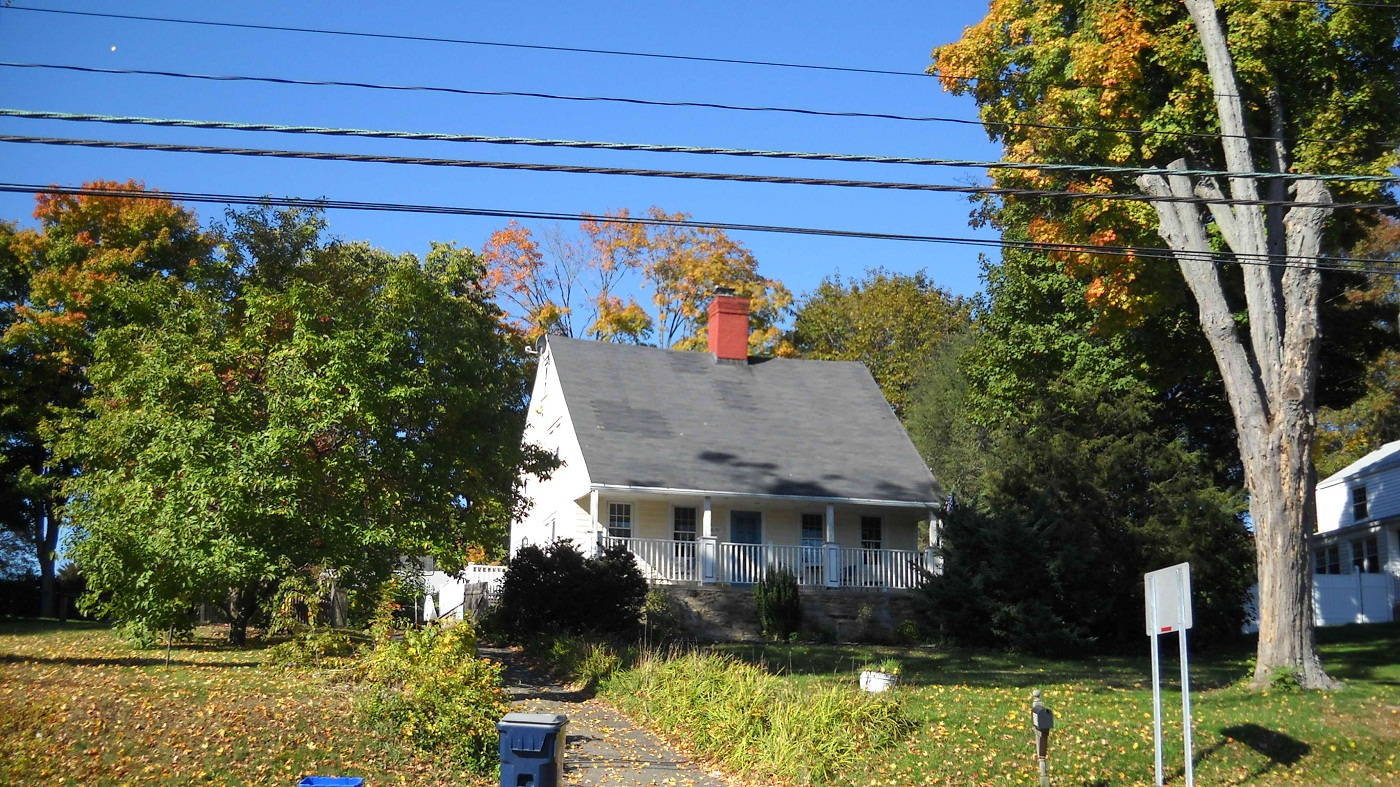
Samuel French House ca. 1736

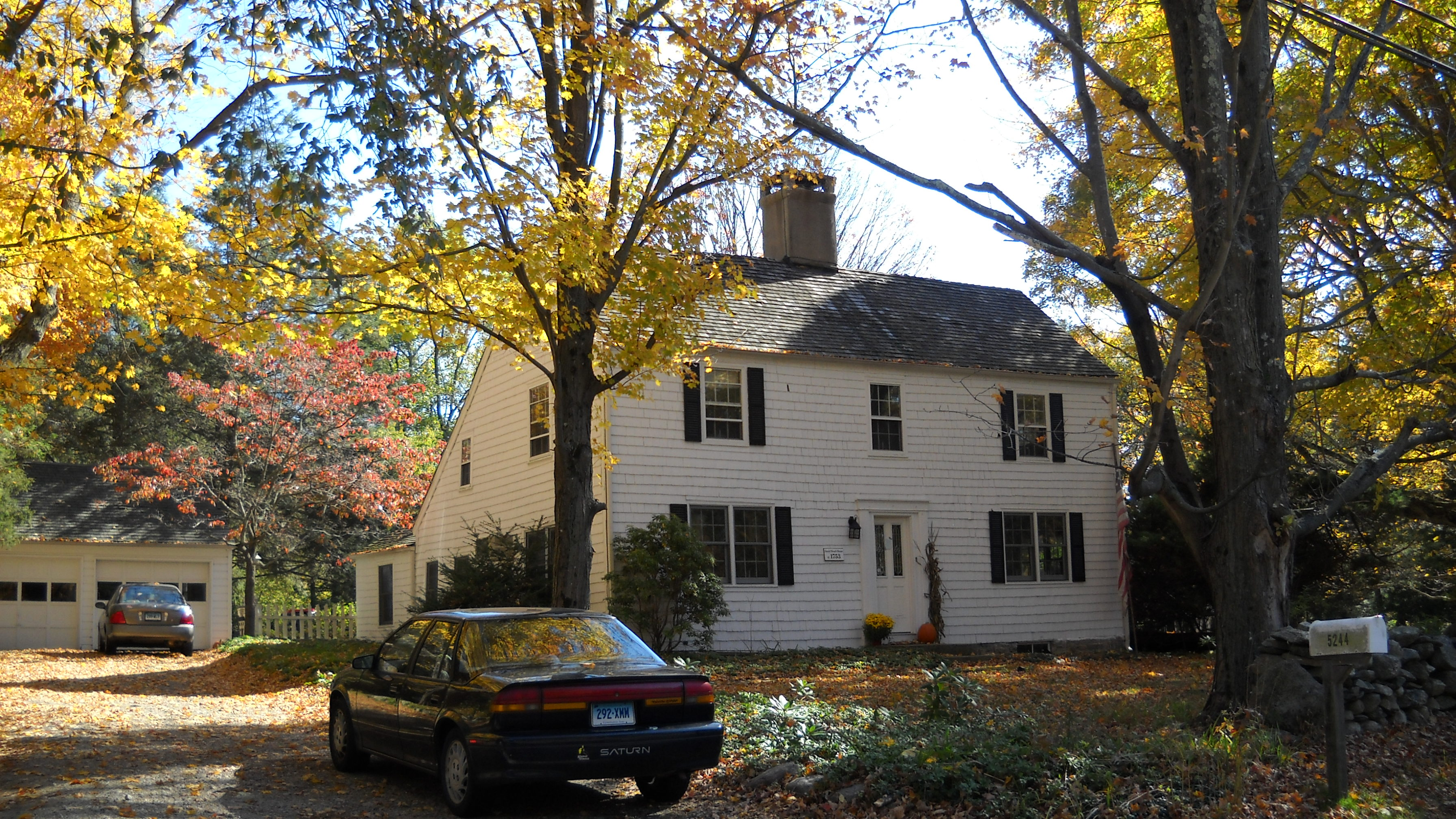
Daniel Beach House ca. 1750

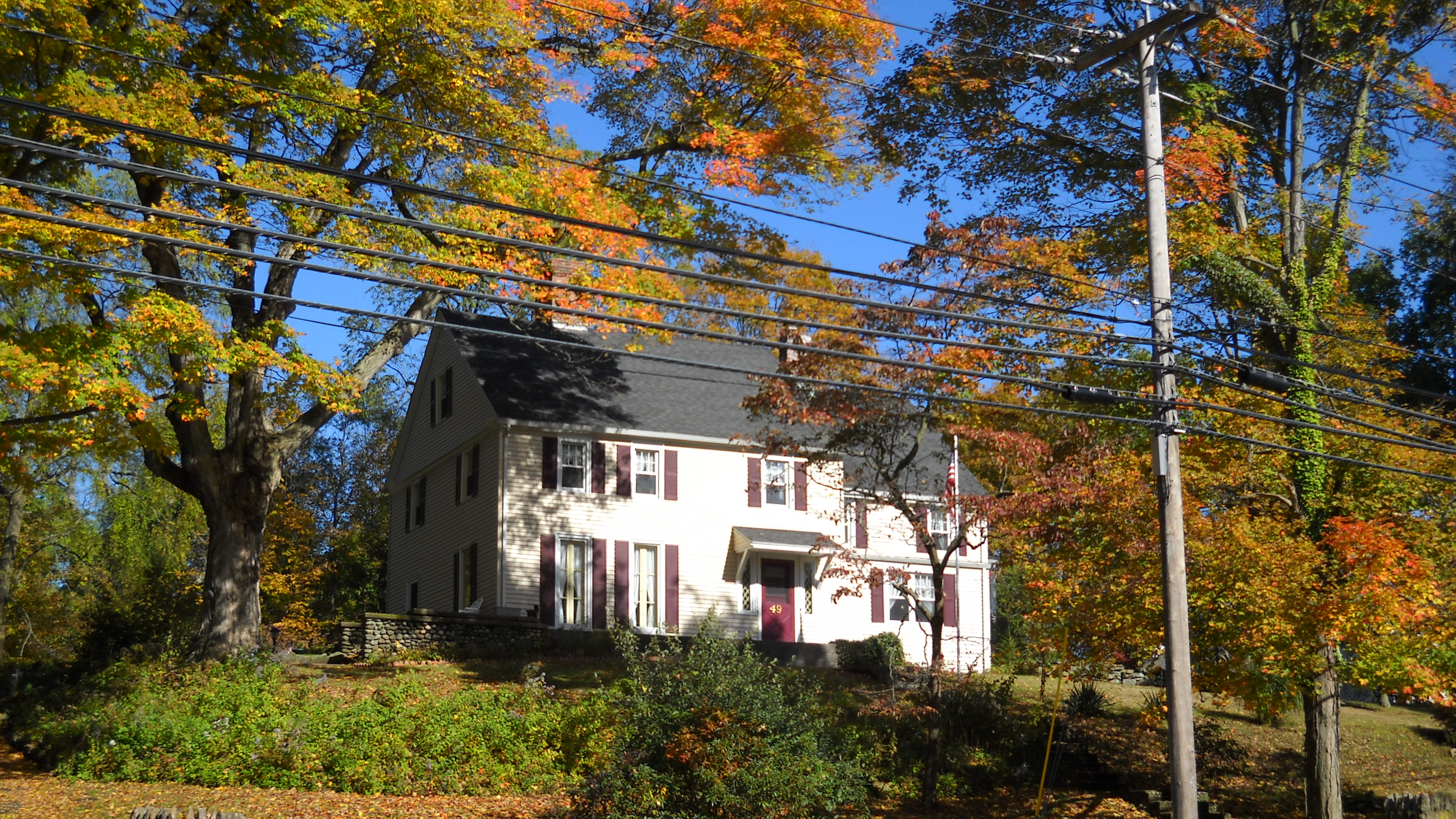
Daniel Hawley House c. 1756

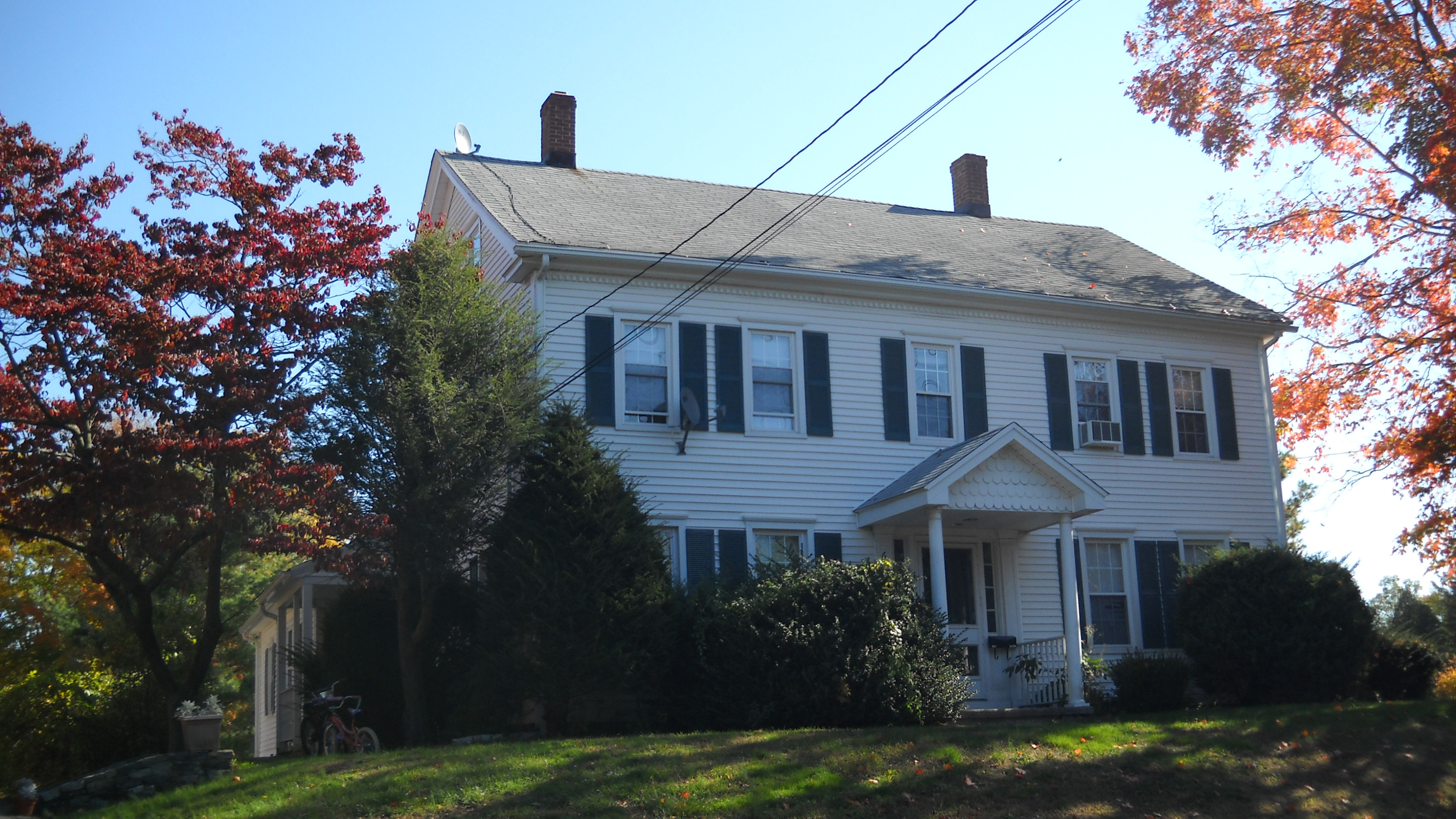
Captain Beardsley House c. 1756

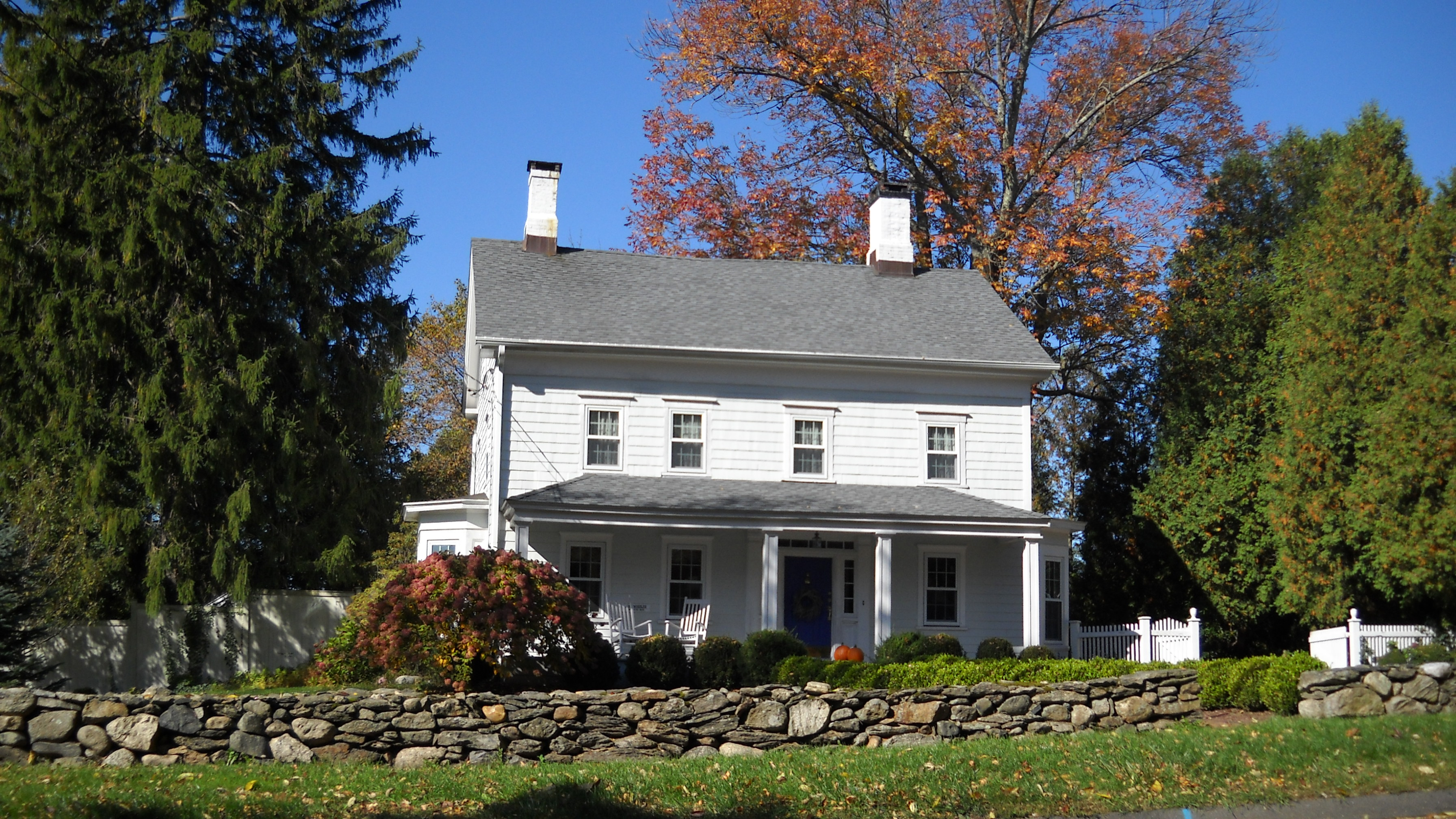
John Wheeler House ca. 1770

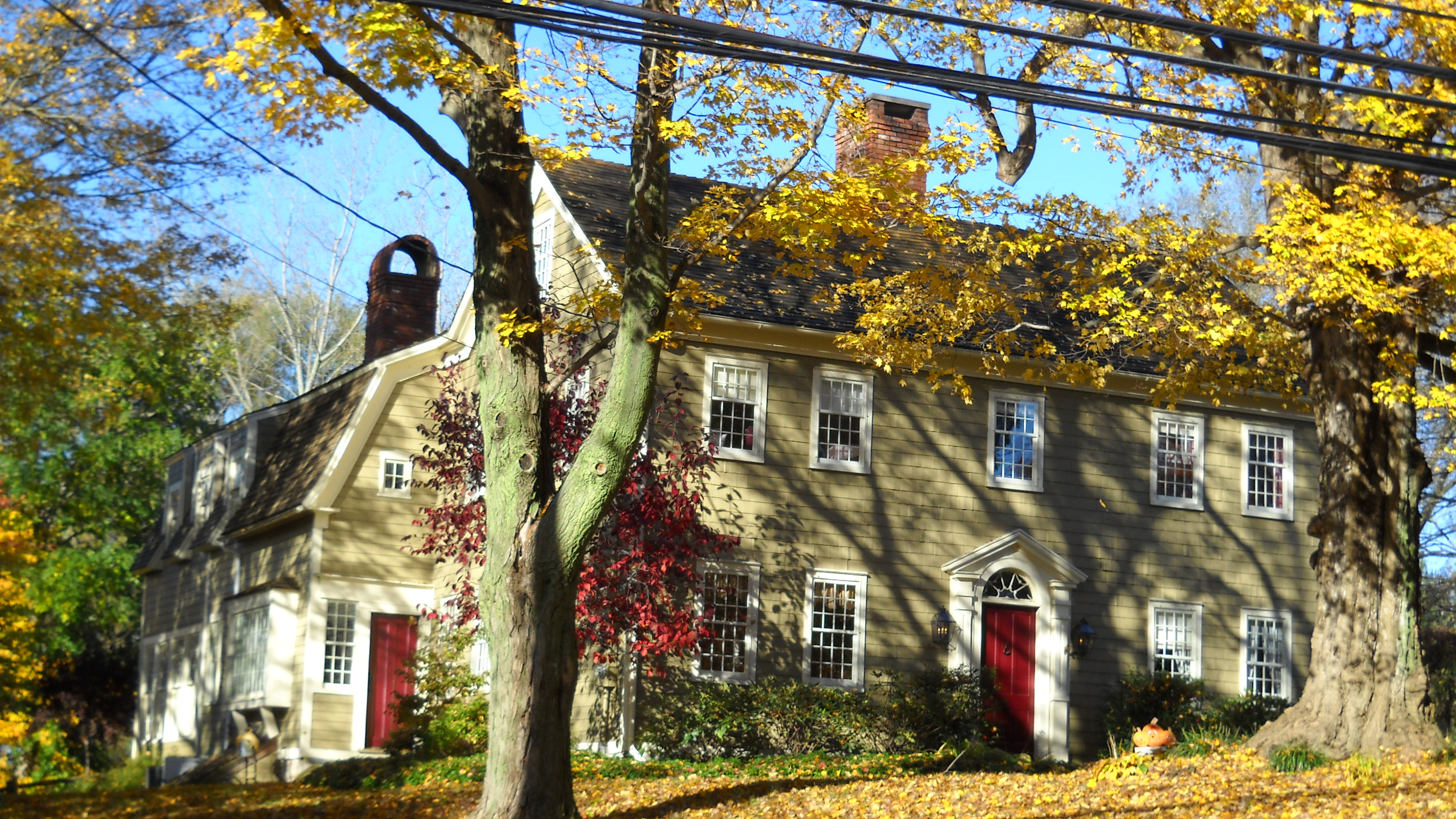
Joseph Plumb House c. 1780

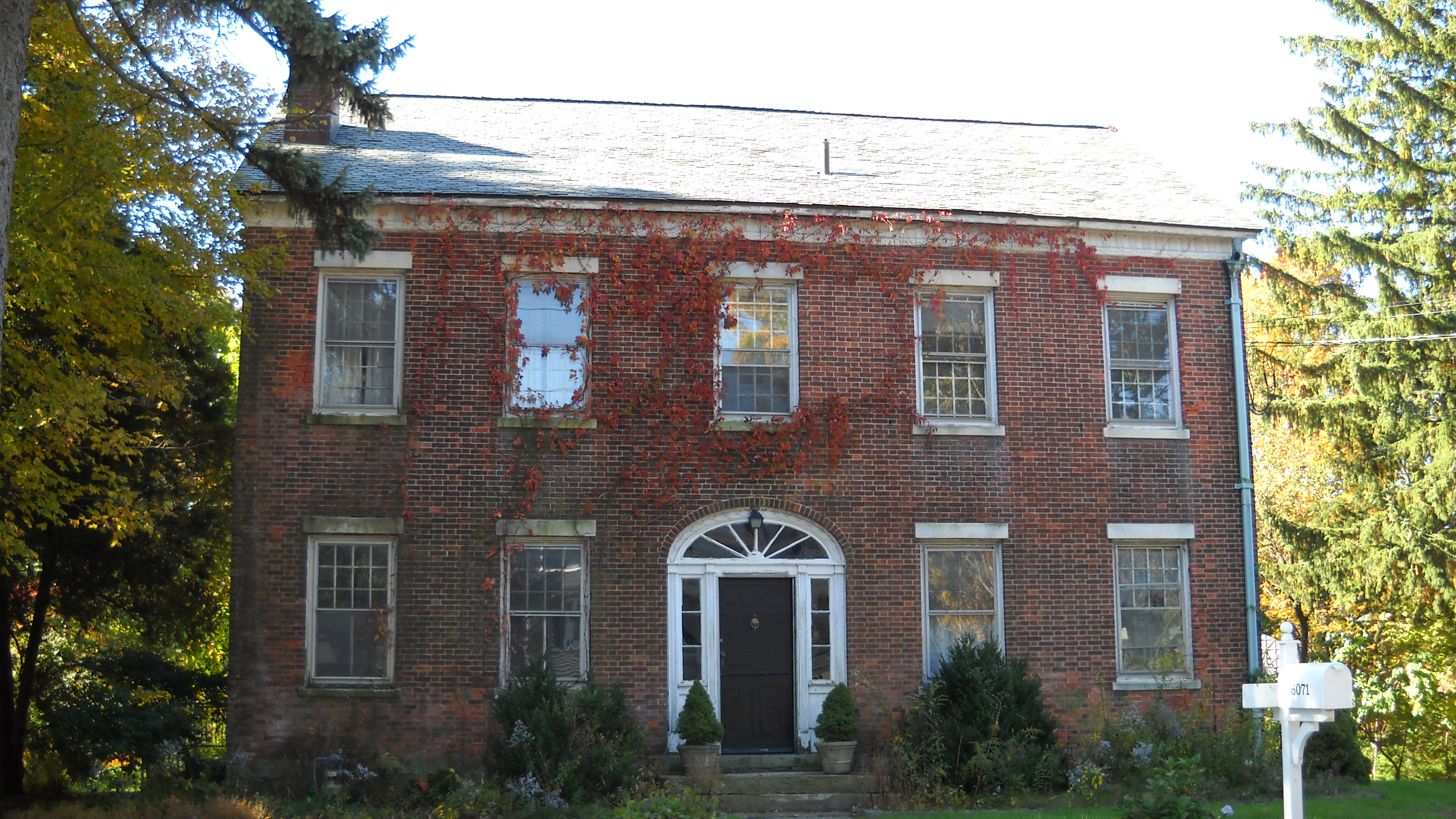
Dr. Elijah Middlebrook House ca. 1824

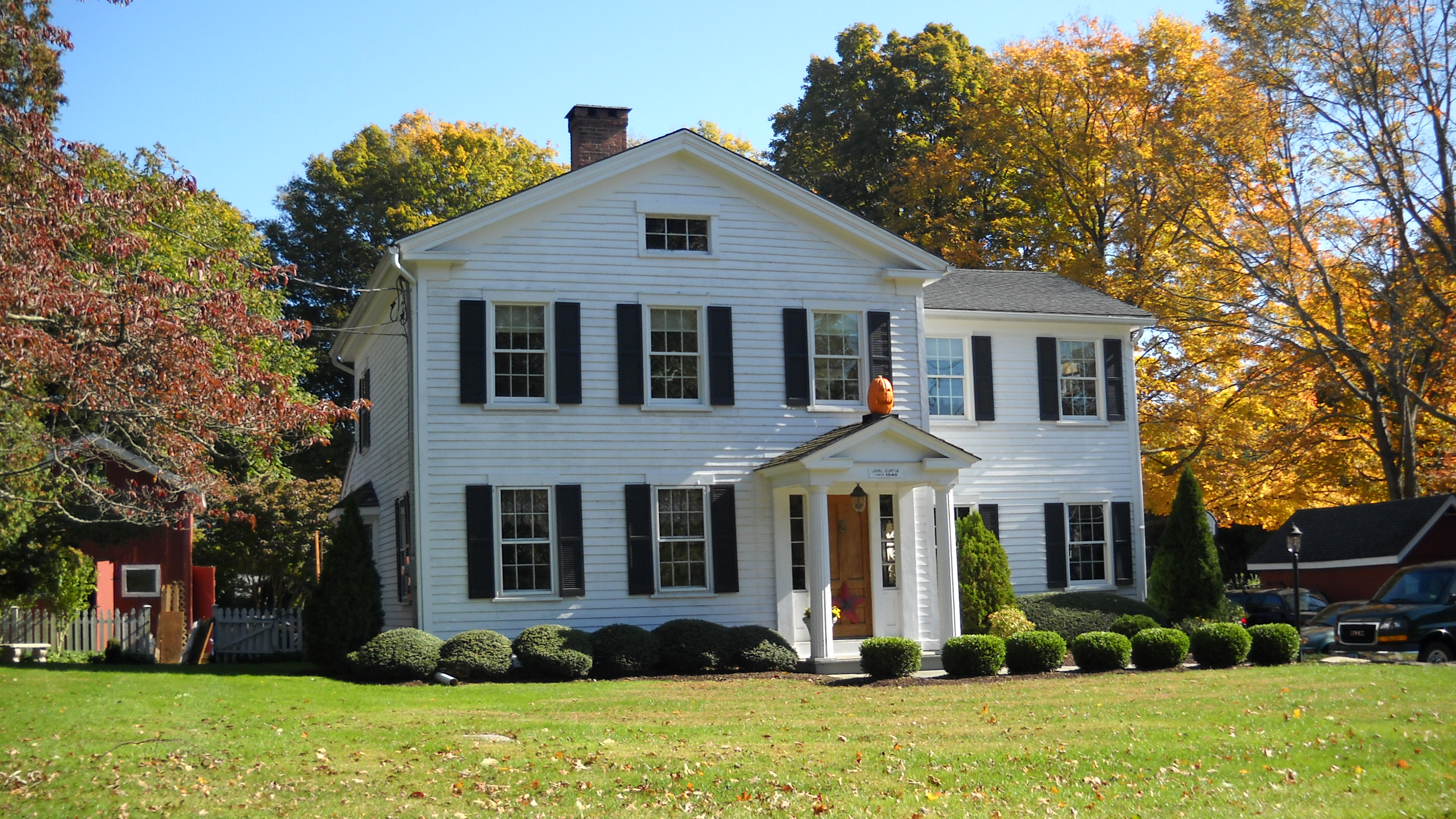
Joel Curtis House c. 1840

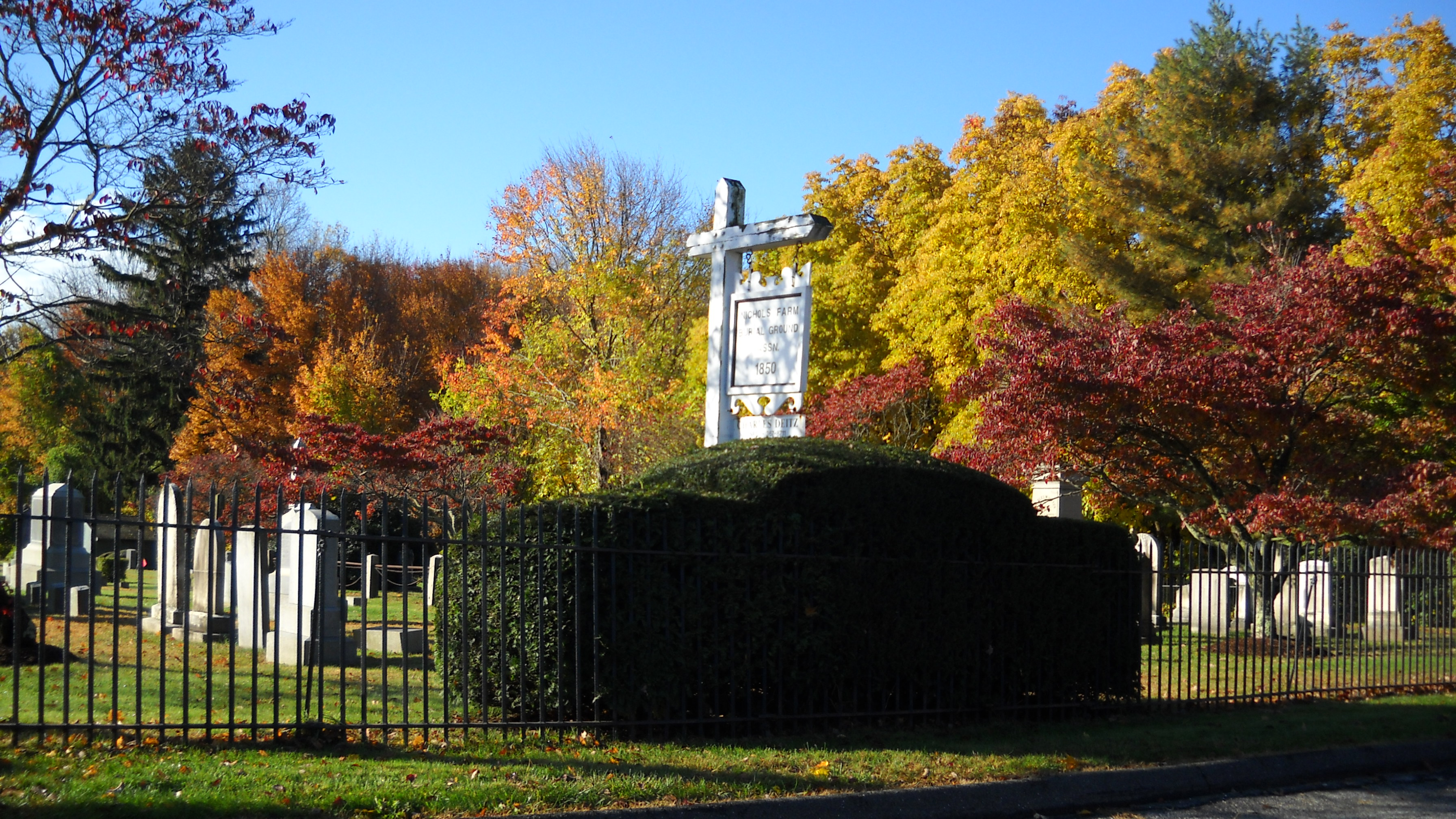
Nichols Farms Burial Ground est. 1850

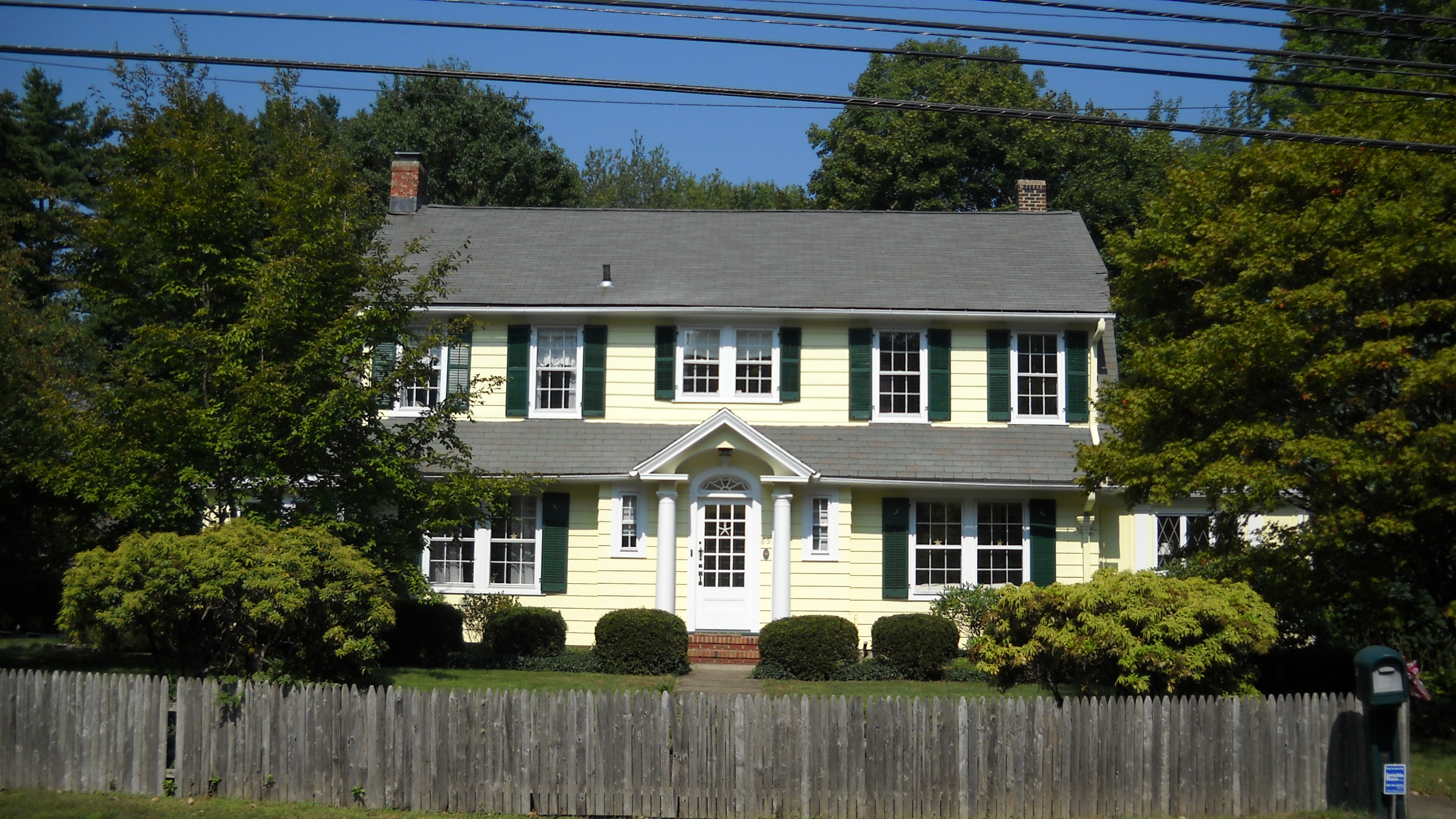
Igor Sikorsky home 1928–1934

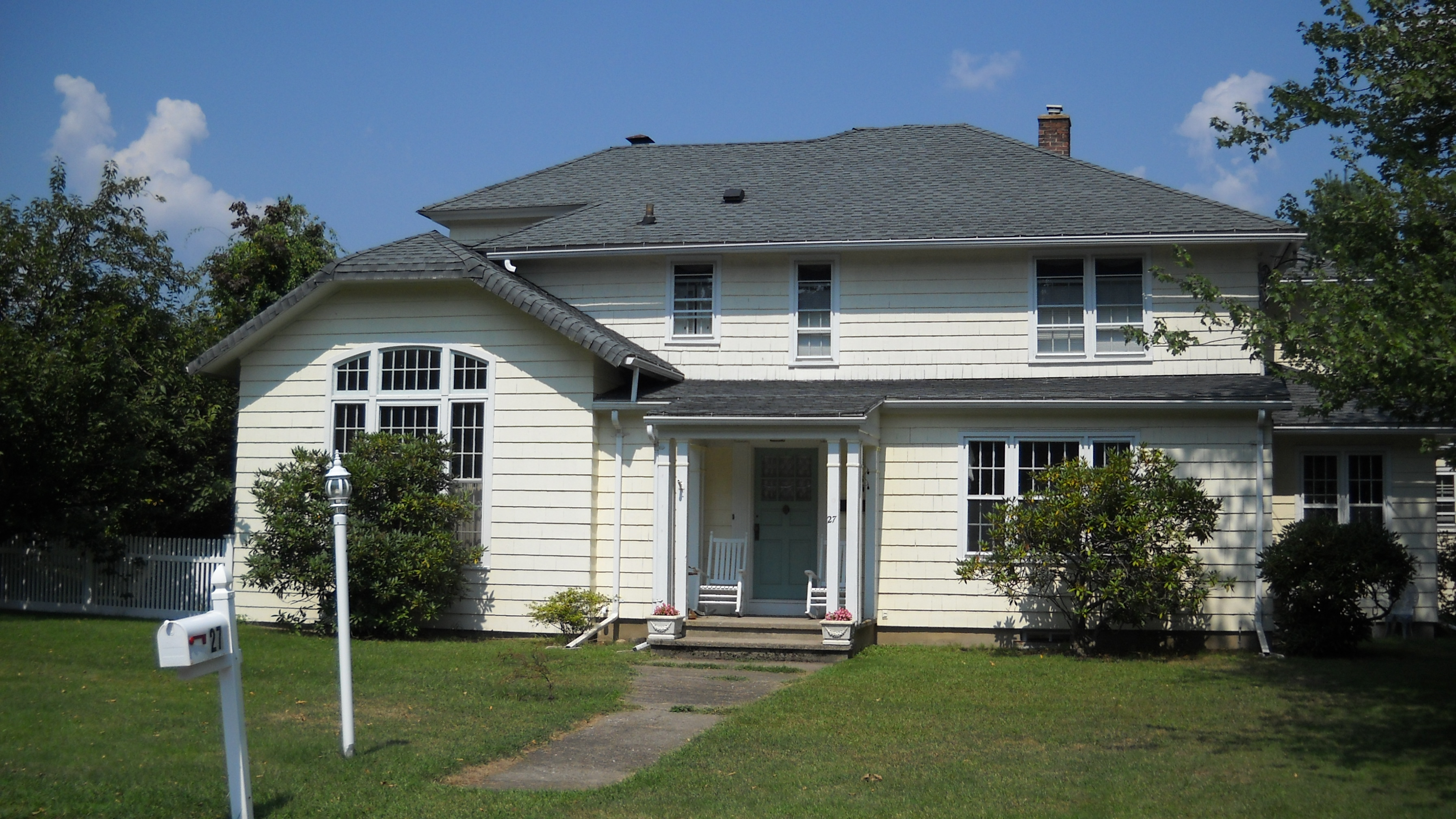
Igor Sikorsky home 1934–1945

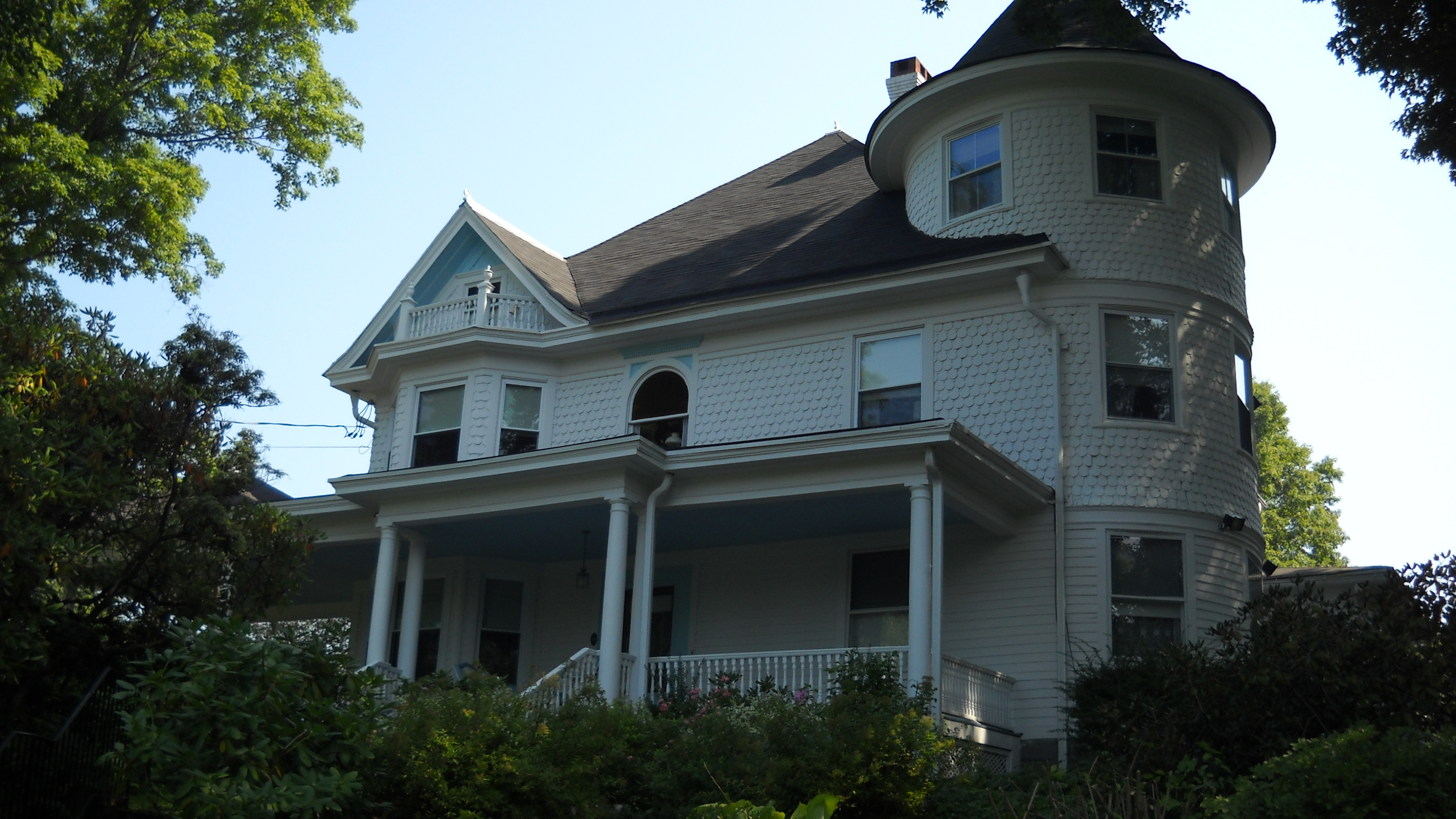
Igor Sikorsky home 1945–1948

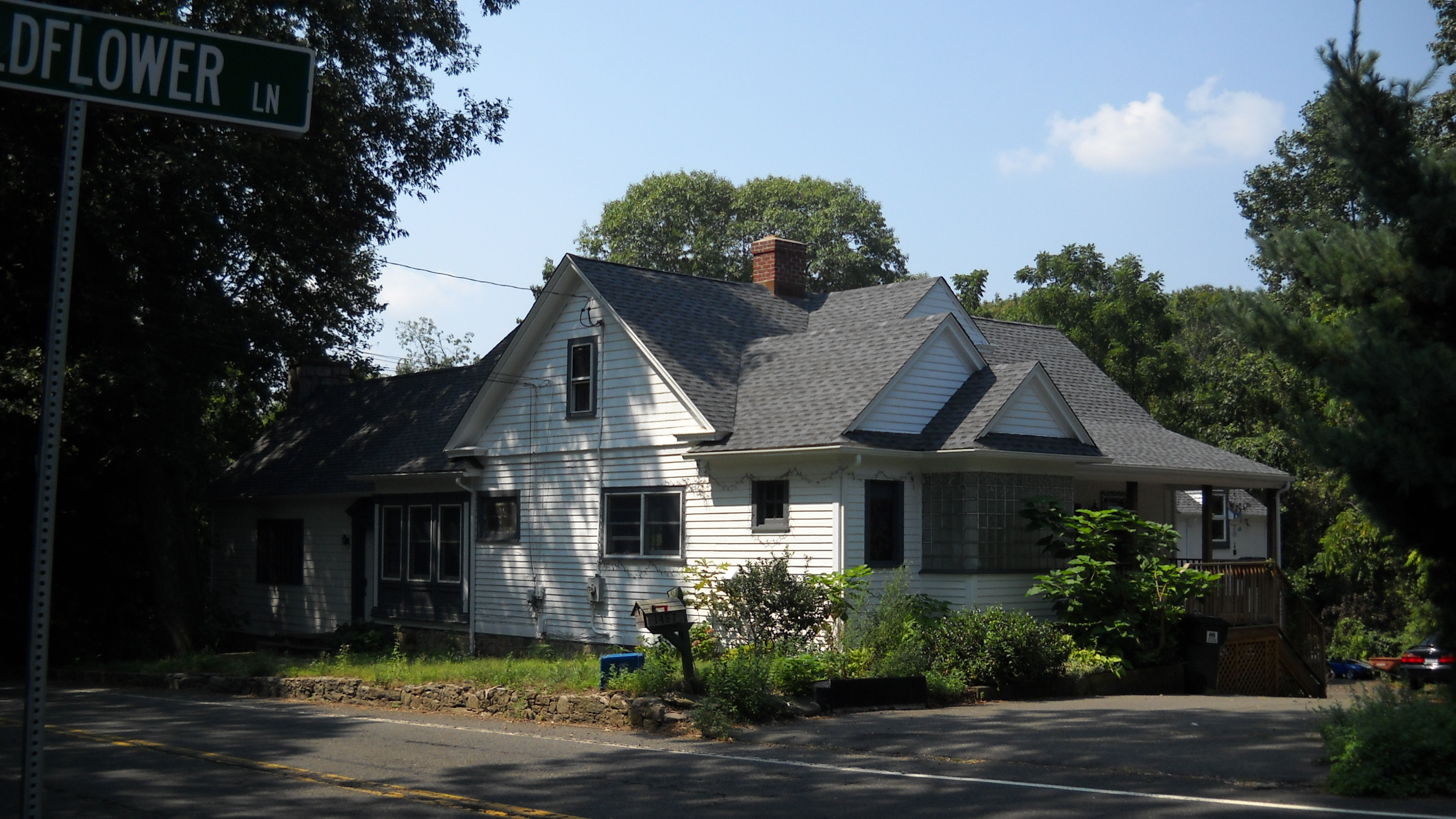
Igor Sikorsky home 1948–1951

== See also ==
- Golden Hill Paugussett Indian Nation

== Notes and references ==
=== References ===
- Reverend Samuel Orcutt, A History of the Old Town of Stratford and the City of Bridgeport, Connecticut, Volume 1, Fairfield Historical Society, 1886
- Reverend Samuel Orcutt, A History of the Old Town of Stratford and the City of Bridgeport, Connecticut, Volume 2, Fairfield Historical Society, 1886
- History of Trumbull Dodrasquicentennial 1797–1972 Commemorative Book, Trumbull Historical Society, 1972
- Isaac William Stuart, Life of Jonathan Trumbull Sen., Governor of Connecticut, Crocker and Brewster, 1859
- Henry Phelps Johnston, The Yorktown Campaign and the Surrender of Cornwallis, 1781, Ayer Publishing, 1971
- Charles S. Hall, Life and Letters of Samuel Holden Parsons, Ostenigo Publishing Co., Binghamton, NY, 1905
- E. Merrill Beach, They Face the Rising Sun, Trumbull Historical Society, 1971
- E. Merrill Beach, Trumbull, Church and Town, Trumbull Historical Society, 1972
- Dorothy Seeley, Tales of Trumbull's Past, Trumbull Historical Society, 1984
- Jonathan Sutherland, African Americans at War: an encyclopedia Vol. 1, 2004
