= North Stratford =

North Stratford may refer to:

- North Stratford, Connecticut, a defunct town within what is now town of Trumbull, Connecticut
- North Stratford, New Hampshire, a village within the town of Stratford, New Hampshire
- The North Stratford Railroad in New Hampshire and Vermont
