= David Mallett Jr. House =

Historic house in Connecticut, United States

- U.S. National Register of Historic Places
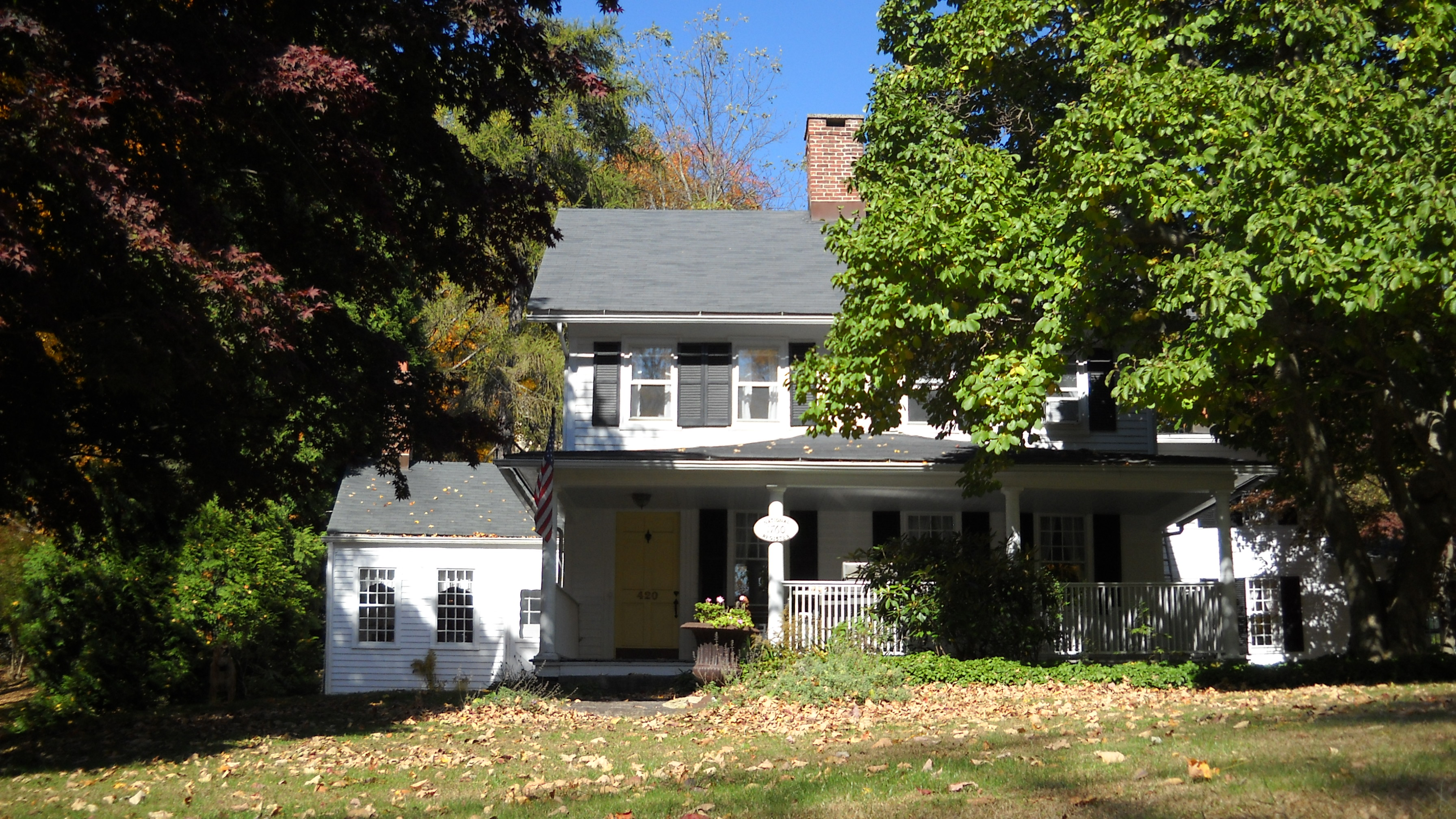

- Location within Connecticut Location within the United States
- Location: 420 Tashua Road, Trumbull, Connecticut
- Coordinates: 41°17′12″N 73°15′39″W
- Area: 1.5 acres (0.61 ha)
- Built: 1760
- Architect: David Mallett Jr.
- NRHP reference No.: 86000266
- Added to NRHP: February 20, 1986

The David Mallett Jr. House, also known as The Mallett House, is a historical site located at 420 Tashua Road in Trumbull, Connecticut. It lies directly across Tashua Road from the Christ Episcopal Church and Tashua Burial Ground. The site consists of a 1.5-acre (6,100 m^{2}) property and two buildings. The residence measures 3,196 square feet (296.9 m^{2}), was constructed in 1760, and is privately owned. It was added to the National Register of Historic Places in 1986.

It is a well-preserved center-chimney colonial farmhouse with a 150-year history of association with the Mallett family.

== See also ==
- History of Trumbull, Connecticut
- National Register of Historic Places listings in Fairfield County, Connecticut
