= Gregory's Four Corners Burial Ground =

Historic site in Fairfield County, Connecticut, US

Coordinates: 41.2935°N 73.2415°W

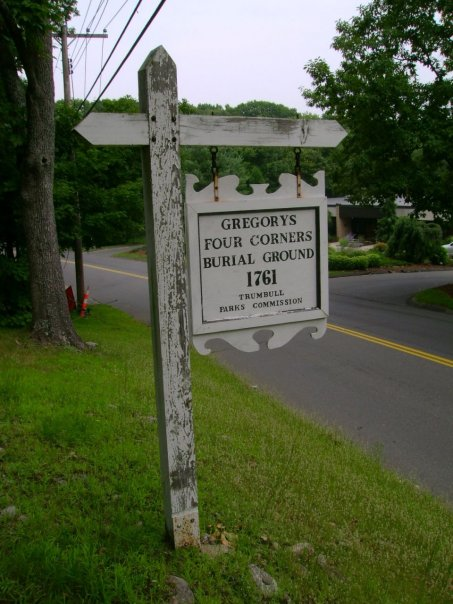
Gregory's Four Corners Burial Ground in 2007

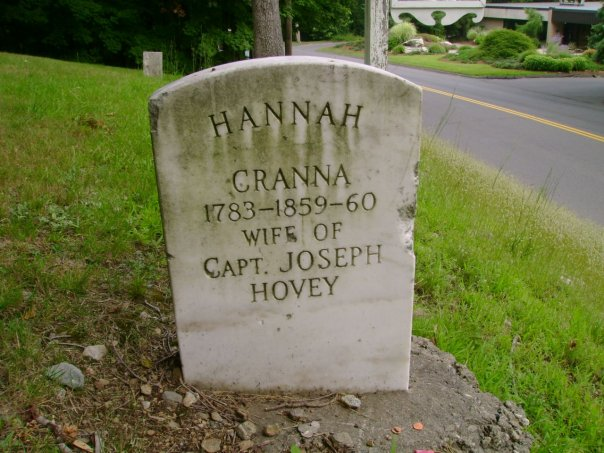
The grave of Hannah Cranna, the Wicked Witch of Monroe, in 2007

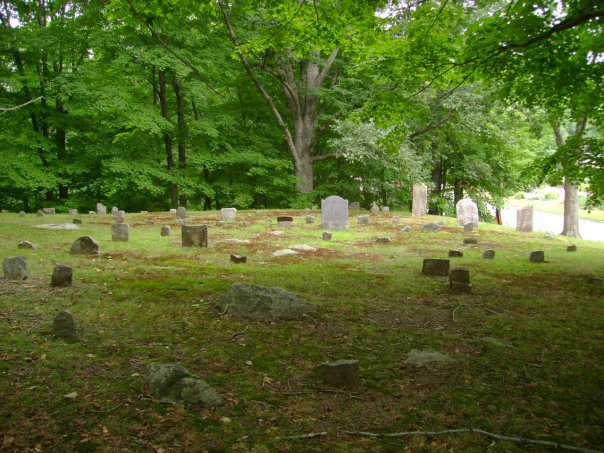
Gregory's Four Corners Burial Ground in 2007

Gregory's Four Corners Burial Ground, a cemetery established in Trumbull, Connecticut in 1761, is located on Spring Hill Road near the Monroe town line and is maintained by the Trumbull Parks Commission.

== Hannah Cranna ==
One of the more notable graves in the graveyard, and one of the best preserved, is that of Hannah Hovey, nicknamed "Hannah Cranna", who was purported by local folklore and many residents of Monroe to be a witch. Rather than deny any of the accusations, she reportedly used her reputation to terrify those who crossed her with threats of curses.

== See also ==
- Witchcraft
