= Christ Church and Tashua Burial Ground =

Historic site in Fairfield County, Connecticut, US

- Christ Episcopal Church and Tashua Burial Ground
- U.S. National Register of Historic Places
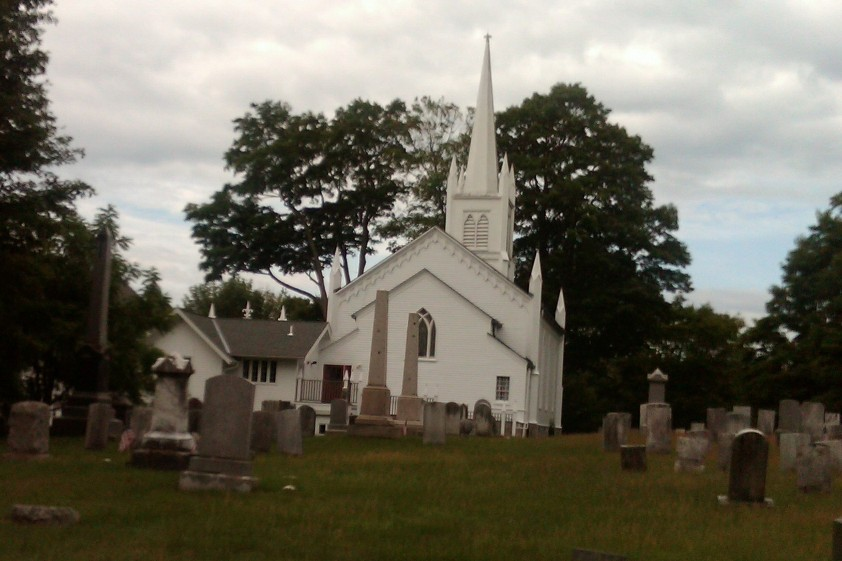
- The church seen from the graveyard

- Location within Connecticut Location within the United States
- Location: 5170 Madison Avenue, Trumbull, Connecticut
- Coordinates: 41°17′12″N 73°15′38″W
- Area: 1.7 acres (0.69 ha)
- Built: 1766
- Architect: Hotchkiss, Clark and Co.
- Architectural style: Gothic Revival
- NRHP reference No.: 01000401
- Added to NRHP: April 25, 2001

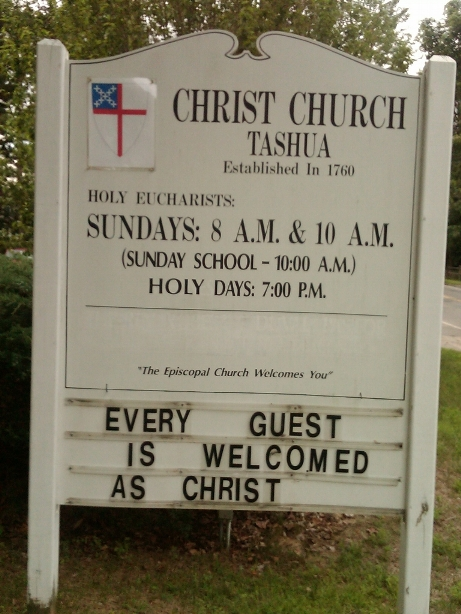
Sign for Christ Episcopal Church.

Christ Church and Tashua Burial Ground is a historic property including an Episcopal Church building and cemetery at 5170 Madison Avenue in Trumbull, Connecticut. The property was listed on the National Register of Historic Places in 2001.

== History ==
Two prior church buildings had been on the site before the cornerstone of the existing church was laid in 1826. This building is believed to have been designed by Alexander Jackson Davis and was consecrated in 1847. The original building was a 36’ X 26’ structure and stood at the north end of the graveyard. The second, larger building was built across from the first and consecrated in 1795 after the first building was abandoned five years earlier.

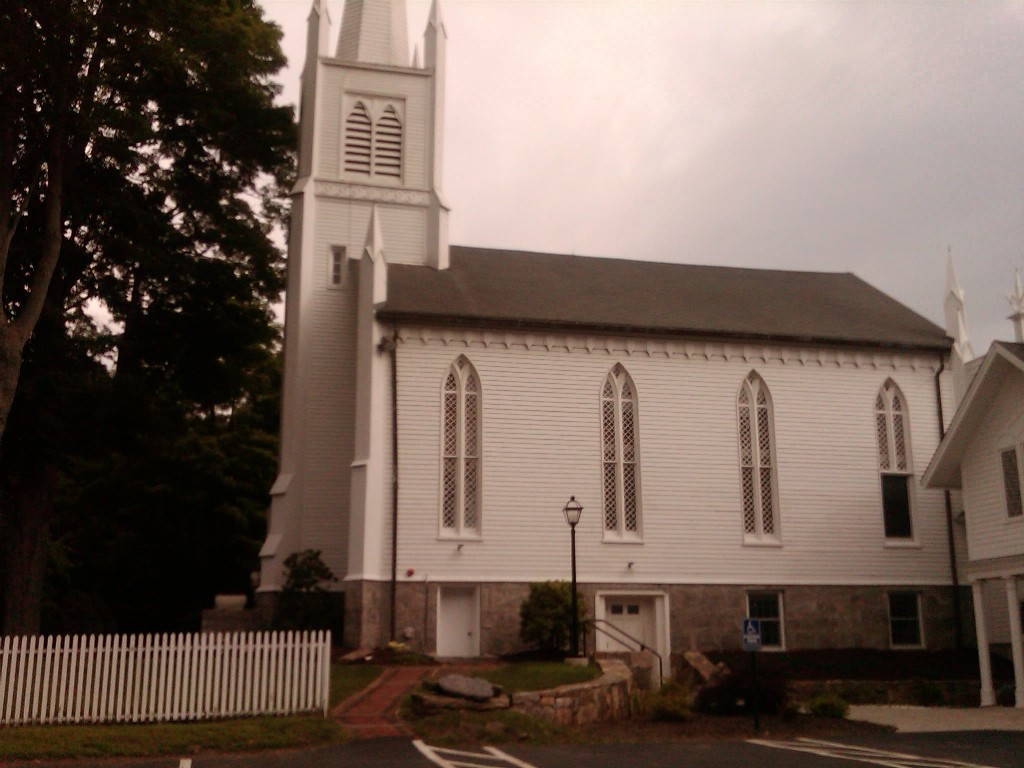
Christ Episcopal Church in 2010.

Inside the building, Christ Church displays the original Bible and Book of Common Prayer that was received by the parish in 1762 from England.

== Today ==
The current building is an example of Carpenter Gothic, a variant of Neo-Gothic architecture. The church parish is an active part of the community offering online and in person services on Sunday at 9am as well as engaging in outreach globally, regionally, and locally. The church offers regular meditation and prayer groups as well as children's ministries and regular fellowship gatherings. The church also engages in anti-racism work offering a monthly Anti-Racism Alliance newsletter. Christ church also engages in environmental justice and prayer for our environment through careful attention to the gardens and by offering a full communion service in the midst of hikes through "Wandering Church." The Church mission is: "We open our hearts to Christ and our arms to all" and this church community certainly does that. The parish is committed to prayer and worship and focus on the Bible and embraces all.

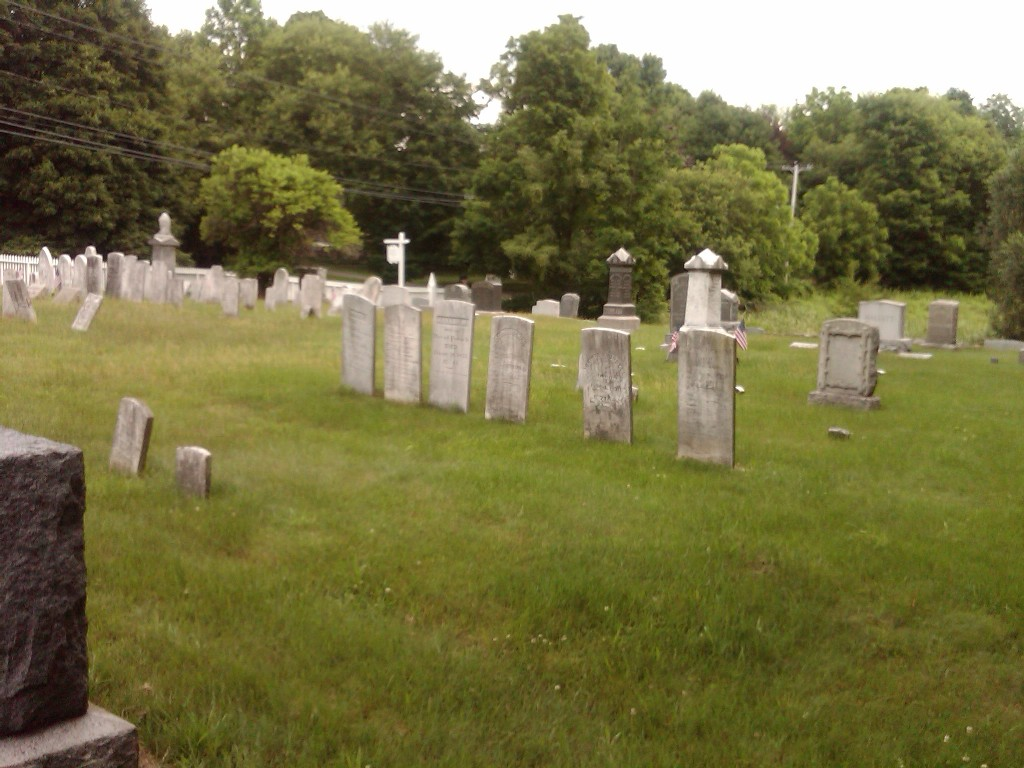
Tashua Burial Ground from the Church.

== Burial ground ==
The burial ground on the site dates to 1766.

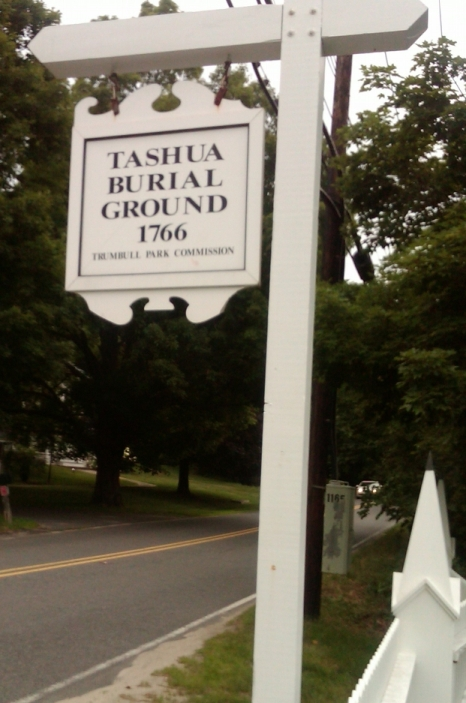
Sign for Tashua Burial Ground.

== See also ==
- National Register of Historic Places listings in Fairfield County, Connecticut
