= Cathleen Falsani =

American journalist and author

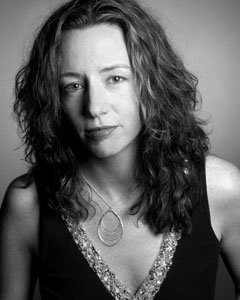
- Born: September 25, 1970 (age 55); Connecticut, United States
- Education: Wheaton College; Northwestern University; Garrett–Evangelical Theological Seminary
- Occupations: Journalist; author; columnist
- Spouse: Maurice Possley
- Website: cathleenfalsani.com

Cathleen Falsani (born September 25, 1970) is an American journalist and author. She specializes in the intersection of religion/spirituality/faith and culture, and has been a staff writer for the Chicago Sun Times, the Chicago Tribune, Sojourners magazine, Religion News Service, and the Orange County Register in Southern California. Falsani is the author of several non-fiction books on religious, spiritual, and cultural issues.

She was the 2005 Religion Writer of the Year, as awarded by the Religion Newswriters Association, and has twice been a finalist for the Templeton Religion Reporter of the Year award.

== Early life and education ==
Falsani was born on September 25, 1970. She holds masters degrees in journalism from the Medill School of Journalism at Northwestern University, and in theological studies from Garrett–Evangelical Theological Seminary in Evanston, Illinois. She was born into a Roman Catholic family of Irish and Italian descent, but her parents left the Catholic church when she was 10 years old. With her younger brother, she was reared as an evangelical Protestant from grade school forward, largely in a Southern Baptist church in Fairfield, Connecticut. Falsani attended Christian Heritage School, an evangelical Christian prep school in Trumbull, Connecticut, graduating in 1988.

== Career ==
Falsani is the author of The God Factor: Inside the Spiritual Lives of Public People, a collection of 32 spiritual profiles of famous "culture shapers" including Bono, Elie Wiesel, Anne Rice, Hakeem Olajuwon. Falsani's first book, it was published by Farrar, Straus & Giroux in 2006, launching Sarah Crichton Books, a new imprint of the publisher. It was named among the best non-fiction books of 2006 by The Christian Science Monitor.

Falsani joined the Chicago Sun-Times in September 2000, and served as the paper's religion reporter until 2007, continuing on as its religion columnist until January 13, 2010. She wrote, Sin Boldly: A Field Guide For Grace (2008) a spiritual memoir and travelogue and The Dude Abides: The Gospel According to the Coen Brothers (2009), both published by Zondervan.

Falsani is a correspondent and columnist for Religion News Service and a featured writer and correspondent for Sojourners. She also was web editor and director of new media for Sojourners from 2011 to 2012. She was the staff "faith and values" columnist for the Orange County Register from 2013 to 2014.

=== Interview with Obama on religion ===
In March 2004, Falsani conducted an interview with Barack Obama. At the time of the interview, Obama was a state senator from Illinois and democratic nominee for the U.S. Senate in the 2004 election. The interview focused on Obama's religious beliefs and spiritual predilections.

== Personal ==
The granddaughter of Italian and Irish immigrants, Falsani was born and raised in Connecticut. Since 1997, Falsani has been married to Maurice Possley, the Pulitzer Prize–winning former Chicago Tribune investigative reporter and New York Times bestselling author. The couple has a son adopted from Malawi in 2010, and reared him in Laguna Beach, California until relocating to the Republic of Ireland, where Falsani is a citizen, in 2024.

== Books ==
- The God Factor: Inside the Spiritual Lives of Public People. Farrar, Straus and Giroux. 2006. ISBN 0374163812.
- Sin Boldly: A Field Guide for Grace. Zondervan. 2008. ISBN 9780310279471.
- The Dude Abides: The Gospel According to the Coen Brothers. Zondervan. 2009. ISBN 9780310292463.
- Belieber!: Fame, Faith and the Heart of Justin Bieber. Worthy Publishing. 2011. ISBN 9781936034772.
- Disquiet Time: Rants and Reflections on the Good Book by the Skeptical, the Faithful, and a Few Scoundrels (co-editor). Jericho/Hachette. 2014. ISBN 978-1455578825.
- The End of Hunger: Renewed Hope for Feeding the World (co-editor). Intervarsity Press. 2019. ISBN 978-0830845712.
