= A Great Jubilee Day =

U.S. holiday celebrating the end of the American Revolutionary War (May 26, 1783)

A Great Jubilee Day, first held on Monday, May 26, 1783, in North Stratford, now Trumbull, Connecticut, commemorated the end of fighting in the American Revolutionary War. This celebration included feasting, prayer, speeches, toasts, and two companies of the North Stratford militia performing maneuvers with cannon discharges and was one of the first documented celebrations following the War for Independence and continued as Decoration Day and today as Memorial Day with prayer services and a parade.

== Reverend Beebe's personal reflections ==
Monday the 26th day of May 1783 the inhabitants of North Stratford set apart as a day of public rejoicing for the late publication of peace. At one o'clock, PM, the people being convened at the meeting house, public worship was opened by singing. The Reverend James Beebe said a prayer well adapted and suitable for the occasion. They all sang a Psalm. Mr. David Lewis Beebe, a student at Yale College, made an oration with great propriety. The congregation then sung an anthem. The Reverend Beebe, then requested the Ladies to take their seats prepared on an eminence for their reception when they walked in procession, and upwards of 300 being seated the committee who were appointed to wait on them supplied their table with necessaries for refreshments. In the meantime the two companies of militia being drawn up performed many maneuvers, and firing by platoons, general volleys and street firing, and the artillery discharging their cannon between each volley with much regularity and accuracy. After which a stage was prepared in the center and the following toasts were given:

- 1st. The United States in Congress Assembled.
- 2nd. General Washington and the brave Officers and soldiers of his command.
- 3rd. Our Faithful and Illustrious Allies.
- 4th. The Friendly Powers of Europe.
- 5th. The Governor and Company of the State of Connecticut.
- 6th. May the present peace prove a glorious one and last forever.
- 7th. May tyranny and despotism sink, and rise no more.
- 8th. May the late war prove an admonition to Great Britain, and the present peace teach its inhabitants their true interests.
- 9th. The Navy of the United States of America.
- 10th. May the Union of these States be perpetual and uninterrupted.
- 11th. May our Trade and Navigation Extend to both Indies and the Balance be found in our favour.
- 12th. May the American Flag always be a scourge to tyrants.
- 13th. May the Virtuous Daughters of America bestow their favors only on those who have Courage to defend them.
- 14th. May Vermont be received into the Federal Union and the Green Mountain Boys flourish.

At the end of each toast a cannon was discharged. The whole was conducted with the greatest decency and every mind seemed to show satisfaction.

== North Stratford Militia ==
The Connecticut general assembly named Robert Hawley the Ensign of the North Stratford Train Band or Company of the 4th regiment of the Connecticut Colony militia in October 1765. He was promoted to Lieutenant in October 1769, and ultimately to captain in May 1773. At a special meeting assembled in North Stratford on November 10, 1777, he was appointed to a committee to provide immediately all those necessaries for the Continental Army soldiers. On March 12, 1778, the parish of North Stratford made donations of provisions for those residents serving in the southern army stationed at Valley Forge, Pennsylvania, under the command of General George Washington. Mr. Stephen Middlebrook donated the sum of seven pounds (money), three shillings and ten pence to transport the almost two hundred pounds of provisions. George Washington called Connecticut the Provision State because of supplies contributed to his army by Governor Jonathan Trumbull the only Colonial Governor to support the cause of America's Independence from Great Britain.

== See also ==
- Memorial Day
- Valley Forge
