= Dalling Field at Saint Joseph High School Field =

Soccer facility in Trumbull, Connecticut

Coordinates: 41.263409°N 73.162657°W

- Interactive map of Dalling Field at Saint Joseph High School Field
- Location: 2320 Huntington Turnpike, Trumbull, CT 06611
- Operator: Saint Joseph High School of Trumbull, Connecticut
- Surface: Grass

Tenants
- Saint Joseph High School; Yankee Lady FC

Dalling Field at Saint Joseph High School Field is a soccer facility located in Trumbull, Connecticut, within the Saint Joseph High School Athletic Complex. It is the home of the Saint Joseph High School sports team, and Yankee Lady FC of the Women's Premier Soccer League (WPSL).
