= Daniels Farm, Connecticut =

Census-designated place in Connecticut, United States

- Census-designated place
- Location within Connecticut Location within the United States
- Coordinates: 41°16′40″N 73°12′08″W
- Country: United States
- State: Connecticut
- County: Fairfield
- Town: Trumbull

Area
  - Total: 4.88 sq mi (12.64 km^{2})
  - Land: 4.88 sq mi (12.63 km^{2})
  - Water: 0.0039 sq mi (0.01 km^{2})
- Elevation: 509 ft (155 m)
- Time zone: UTC-5 (Eastern (EST))
  - Summer (DST): UTC-4 (EDT)
- ZIP Code: 06611 (Trumbull)
- Area codes: 203/475
- FIPS code: 09-18675
- GNIS feature ID: 2805070

Daniels Farm is a census-designated place (CDP) in the town of Trumbull, Fairfield County, Connecticut, United States. It is in the northeastern part of Trumbull and is bordered to the northeast by the city of Shelton. The Connecticut Route 25 expressway forms the southwest edge of the CDP, and Route 111 (Monroe Turnpike) forms the short northwest edge. The CDP extends south as far as Hedgehog Road, Old Dike Road, and Pinewood Trail. To the south is the Trumbull Center CDP. As of the 2020 census, Daniels Farm had a population of 6,150.

Daniels Farm was first listed as a CDP prior to the 2020 census.

== Demographics ==
=== 2020 census ===
As of the 2020 census, Daniels Farm had a population of 6,150. The median age was 42.2 years. 27.6% of residents were under the age of 18 and 15.5% of residents were 65 years of age or older. For every 100 females there were 97.4 males, and for every 100 females age 18 and over there were 92.9 males age 18 and over.

100.0% of residents lived in urban areas, while 0.0% lived in rural areas.

There were 1,918 households in Daniels Farm, of which 45.4% had children under the age of 18 living in them. Of all households, 79.2% were married-couple households, 7.2% were households with a male householder and no spouse or partner present, and 11.3% were households with a female householder and no spouse or partner present. About 10.4% of all households were made up of individuals and 7.3% had someone living alone who was 65 years of age or older.

There were 1,970 housing units, of which 2.6% were vacant. The homeowner vacancy rate was 1.1% and the rental vacancy rate was 10.9%.

Racial composition as of the 2020 census
Race	Number	Percent
White	4,870	79.2%
Black or African American	217	3.5%
American Indian and Alaska Native	10	0.2%
Asian	529	8.6%
Native Hawaiian and Other Pacific Islander	1	0.0%
Some other race	126	2.0%
Two or more races	397	6.5%
Hispanic or Latino (of any race)	377	6.1%
