= Tashua, Connecticut =

Census-designated place in Connecticut, United States

- Census-designated place
- Location within Connecticut Location within the United States
- Coordinates: 41°17′11″N 73°15′38″W
- Country: United States
- State: Connecticut
- County: Fairfield
- Town: Trumbull

Area
  - Total: 3.80 sq mi (9.83 km^{2})
  - Land: 3.66 sq mi (9.49 km^{2})
  - Water: 0.14 sq mi (0.35 km^{2})
- Elevation: 458 ft (140 m)
- Time zone: UTC-5 (Eastern (EST))
  - Summer (DST): UTC-4 (EDT)
- ZIP Code: 06611 (Trumbull)
- Area codes: 203/475
- FIPS code: 09-75116
- GNIS feature ID: 2805072

Tashua is a census-designated place (CDP) in the town of Trumbull, Connecticut, United States. It occupies the northwestern corner of Trumbull. As of the 2020 census, Tashua had a population of 3,857.

== Demographics ==
=== 2020 census ===
Tashua was first listed as a CDP prior to the 2020 census.

As of the 2020 census, Tashua had a population of 3,857. The median age was 45.9 years. 23.4% of residents were under the age of 18 and 20.7% of residents were 65 years of age or older. For every 100 females there were 98.7 males, and for every 100 females age 18 and over there were 94.5 males age 18 and over.

100.0% of residents lived in urban areas, while 0.0% lived in rural areas.

There were 1,320 households in Tashua, of which 38.1% had children under the age of 18 living in them. Of all households, 72.7% were married-couple households, 8.6% were households with a male householder and no spouse or partner present, and 16.5% were households with a female householder and no spouse or partner present. About 14.6% of all households were made up of individuals and 12.4% had someone living alone who was 65 years of age or older.

There were 1,417 housing units, of which 6.8% were vacant. The homeowner vacancy rate was 0.7% and the rental vacancy rate was 15.3%.

Racial composition as of the 2020 census
Race	Number	Percent
White	3,246	84.2%
Black or African American	103	2.7%
American Indian and Alaska Native	0	0.0%
Asian	228	5.9%
Native Hawaiian and Other Pacific Islander	1	0.0%
Some other race	54	1.4%
Two or more races	225	5.8%
Hispanic or Latino (of any race)	238	6.2%
