= St. Theresa Church (Trumbull, Connecticut) =

Coordinates: 41°14′18.41″N 73°13′12.67″W

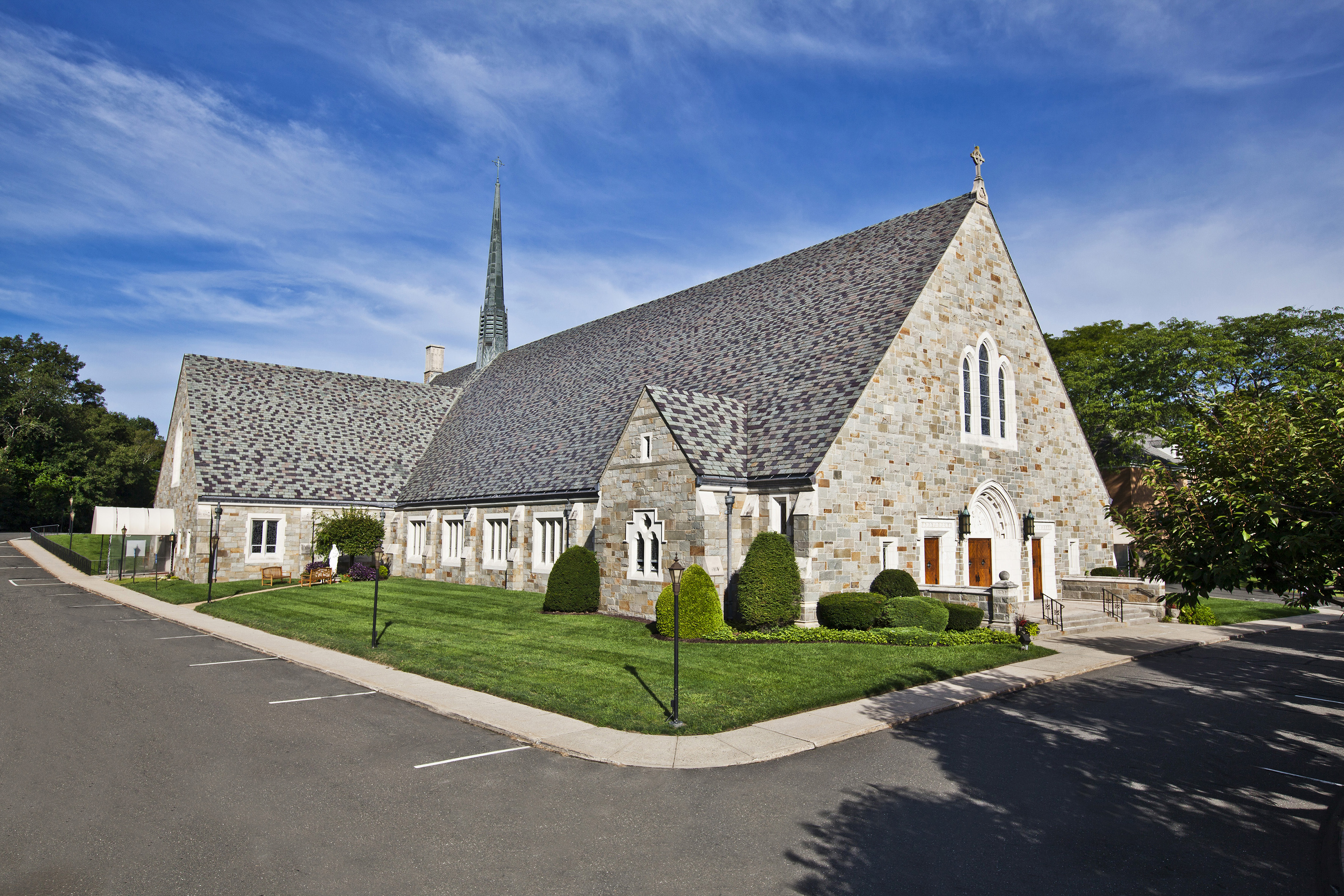
- St. Theresa Church, Trumbull Connecticut
- St. Theresa Church
- Location: 5301 Main Street; Trumbull, Connecticut
- Country: United States
- Denomination: Roman Catholic
- Website: www.sttheresatrumbull.org

History
- Founded: October 4, 1934
- Founder: Bishop Maurice F. McAuliffe
- Dedicated: September 22, 1935 (original structure), April 1, 1962 (current structure)

Architecture
- Architect(s): William Schmidt (original structure); J. Gerald Phelan

Administration
- Province: Hartford
- Diocese: Bridgeport
- Parish: Saint Theresa Parish

Clergy
- Bishop: Most Rev. Frank J. Caggiano
- Priest: Rev. Peter Anumaka
- Pastor: Rev. Brian Gannon

St. Theresa Church is a Roman Catholic church in Trumbull, Connecticut, a part of the Diocese of Bridgeport. The parish is considered the Mother Church of Trumbull and is the largest in town with over 3,100 parishioner families.

== History ==
The Saint Theresa Parish was originally created on October 4, 1934, by Bishop Maurice F. McAuliffe of Hartford. Aware of the spiritual needs of the people of Trumbull, the Bishop made Saint Theresa's the first Catholic Church in town, and dedicated it in honor of Thérèse of Lisieux, the Little Flower of Jesus. Bishop McAuliffe dedicated the original small white frame church on September 22, 1935, so that Saint Theresa's functioned as a true parish. The original church was a classic New England colonial design that could seat some four hundred people, and the neighboring McLevy homestead became the parish rectory.

In 1960, Bishop Lawrence J. Shehan gave permission to construct the present cathedral-like granite and limestone church building, which was dedicated by Bishop Walter W. Curtis on April 1, 1962. The parish celebrated its Diamond Jubilee in 2009 and received a letter of congratulations from Bishop Lori.

On October 1, 2017, the parish dedicated Our Lady of Fátima Chapel for perpetual Eucharistic adoration. The chapel is open twenty-four hours per day, seven days a week.

== Music ==
The parish has an established traditional church music program. The choir is composed of approximately 35 singers, including four professional section leaders (SATB). The choir sings high quality literature ranging from Gregorian chant and polyphony through 21st century repertoire.

Instruments include a three-manual 38 rank Peragallo pipe organ with 7 additional Walker electronic stops, mainly in the Pedal division. Adjacent to the organ is a Yamaha concert grand piano. The organ is frequently used as a concert instrument and is featured in a 1999 compact disk of French organ works performed by Stephen Tharp. It was also a feature instrument in the 2010 Pipe Organ Encounter program of the Bridgeport Chapter of the American Guild of Organists. Saint Theresa's Church has been a regular site for Connecticut Chamber Choir concerts.

== Parish life ==
Saint Theresa is home to over thirty social and religious ministries, including Boy Scouts of America Troop 68, Knights of Columbus Council 8013, and charitable outreaches such as the Thomas Merton Center.

=== Sons of Saint Joseph ===
Founded in the Parish in 2011, this men's ministry of approximately one hundred twenty members attracted national attention on EWTN. Father Brian Gannon was interviews on the At Home with Jim and Joy program, first broadcast on December 1, 2016. The group is dedicated to helping men become better husbands, fathers, friends and neighbors. It steers a man towards his God ordained and natural roles as exemplified by Jesus Christ. It focuses a man on the true and ultimate goals of his life, which are his salvation, the salvation of his loved ones and the salvation of the world.

== School ==
Saint Theresa School is one of two Catholic K-8 schools in Trumbull, founded in 1955. It is accredited with the New England Association of Schools and Colleges. It is registered as school 2114403 with the State of Connecticut Department of Education. The school celebrated its 60th anniversary in April 2016. The school switched in 2020 to a classical model on the request of Fr. Gannon.
