= Unity Burial Ground =

Cemetery in Trumbull, Connecticut

Coordinates: 41.2363°N 73.1756°W

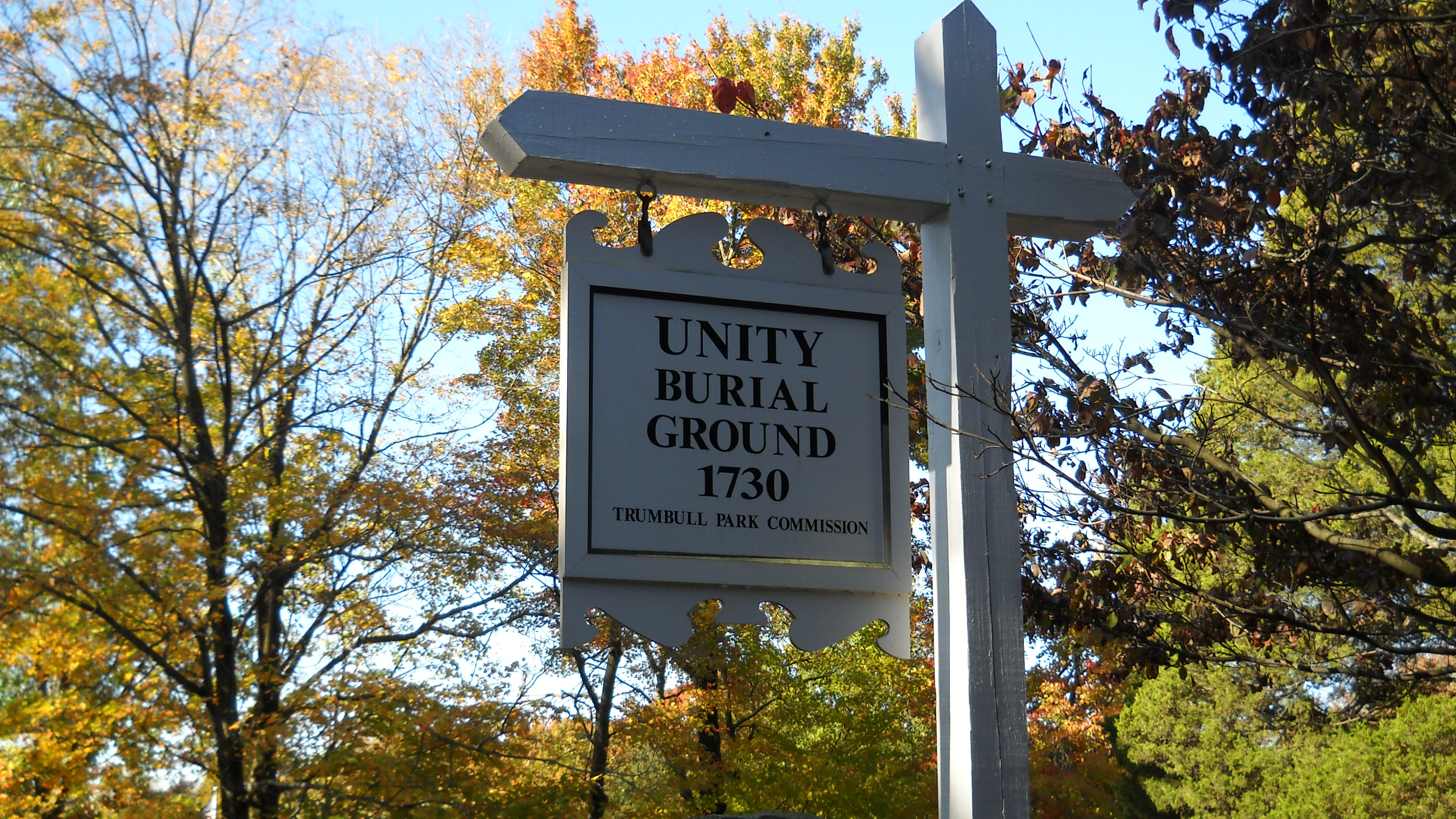
Unity Burial Ground sign

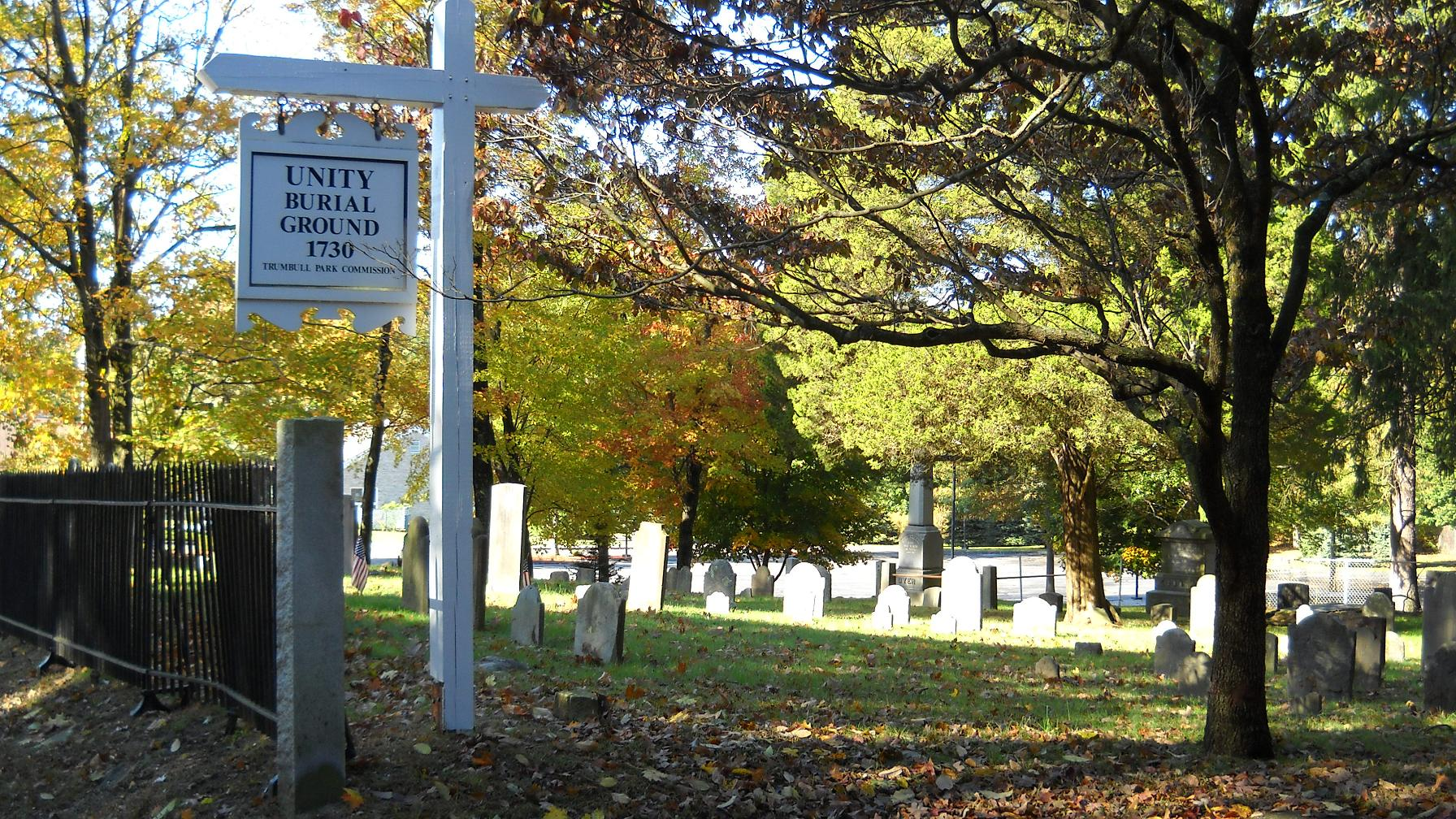
Unity Burial Ground established 1730

The Unity Burial Ground is a small graveyard located on the southeast end of White Plain in the Nichols section of Trumbull, Connecticut. It is located a few rods north of the site of the first meeting house that was built in the parish of Unity, off of White Plains Road. The cemetery was laid out in 1730 and the first burial was that of 7 year old Samuel Bennitt on June 21, 1731. There are over 110 gravestones, 90 unmarked field stones and 241 known grave sites, and most of the original stones face east. This is unusual, as it runs contrary to the common practice of placing stones so that they face the road. The latest known burial was for Charles E Booth Jr. on August 17, 1935.

== Pulpit Rock ==
In February 1694, Thomas Lake purchased land on the east side of the natural grassy flood plains of the Pequonnock River near an area called The Falls. By 1705 Route 110, White Plains Road, was laid out northerly past Lake's house to a natural rock outcropping called Pulpit Rock. Pulpit Rock is located north of the present day intersection of White Plains Road and Unity Road. The first meetings of the Trumbull Congregational Church, established in 1730 as the Parish of Unity and later renamed Trumbull Congregational Church, were held at Pulpit Rock on White Plains Road. This church also served as a town meeting house until 1747 when a new church was built under the leadership of Reverend James Beebe.
