= James Beebe =

James Beebe (1717–1785), Reverend, presided over the Unity Parish at North Stratford, now Trumbull, Connecticut, between 1747 and 1785. He was an Army Preacher in the French and Indian War and a patriot.

== Biography ==
Beebe was born in Danbury, Connecticut, in 1717, the son of one of the town founders. He studied theology at Yale University in New Haven, Connecticut. Beebe married Ruth Curtiss, the daughter of Ephraim and Elizabeth (Stiles) Curtiss, in 1749 and they raised five daughters and two sons; the youngest son, David Lewis Beebe, graduated from Yale College in 1785 and followed in his father's profession.

Besides his pastoral duties, Mr. Beebe also managed a large farm, was part owner of the local grist and sawmills and he owned slaves. One slave in particular was Peg, the wife of free slave Nero Hawley. Since Beebe owned Peg, he owned all of her children too, who were subsequently emancipated by their father after Beebe's death. Beebe died in office on September 8, 1785, in his 68th year. His wife Ruth died on July 29, 1818, at the age of 94.

Beebe's gravestone at the Unity Burial Ground reads:

This Monument was erected by the Church & Society of North Stratford out of respect to the memory of Rev. James Beebe A.M. who departed this life Sept. 8, 1785, in the 68th year of his age. He was ordained to the work of the ministry over said Church & Society May 6, 1747. And continued therein a faithful pastor 38 years.

== Ministry ==
In the fall of 1746, the Fairfield East Association of Ministers contacted the Church at the Unity Parish in Trumbull and advised them that Reverend Beebe was ready to become the minister at their parish. Beebe was ordained and installed at Unity Parish in May 1747. Beebe had his work cut out for him though, as the church had become scattered in 1744 by the conversion to Episcopacy by the last pastor, Reverend Richardson Miner. Under Beebe's leadership, 167 parishioners were added to the Unity Church rolls. Reverend Beebe's ministry in Trumbull lasted for 38 years until he died in office on September 8, 1785, in his 68th year.

== Military service ==
Beebe served as an Army Chaplain in the 3rd Regiment raised in the Colony of Connecticut in March 1760 during the French & Indian War. Beebe was a Patriot, and served in the local militia for eight months in 1776 during the American Revolution. His eldest son James, was a Captain in the Continental Army and wintered with George Washington at the Valley Forge winter encampment.

Beebe was a staunch supporter of the Revolution. One night he organized a public meeting at his house to talk about the Revolution. While he was addressing the people, gunfire was heard and fires were seen in the distance as if the British were coming. Beebe suspected this was a trick. So, he sent a small party by a back road to check it out and to cut off the retreat of this scouting party. They captured the culprits, who turned out to be young men from the town who had burned some cornstalks and were playing a joke on the people at the meeting to test their patriotism.

== A Great Jubilee Day ==
Reverend Beebe organized A Great Jubilee Day on Monday May 26, 1783, in North Stratford, now Trumbull, commemorating the end of fighting in the American Revolutionary War. This celebration included feasting, prayer, speeches, toasts, and two companies of the North Stratford militia performing maneuvers with cannon discharges and was one of the first documented celebrations following the War for Independence and continued as Decoration Day and today as Memorial Day with prayer services and a parade. in May 1783 to commemorate the end of fighting in the American Revolution. The celebration included feasting, prayer, speeches, toasts, and two companies of North Stratford militia performing maneuvers with cannon discharges and was one of the first documented celebrations following the war.
