= Nero Hawley =

Nero Hawley (1742 – January 30, 1817) was an African-American soldier who was born into slavery in North Stratford, Connecticut, and later earned his freedom after enlisting in the Continental Army in place of his owner, Daniel Hawley, on April 20, 1777, during the American Revolution. His life is featured in the 1976 book From Valley Forge to Freedom, which also notes other areas of present-day Trumbull, Connecticut associated with Hawley.

== American Revolutionary War ==
=== 2nd Connecticut ===
The 2nd Connecticut Regiment was raised in the spring of 1777 for the new army or Continental Line and was made up of free and enslaved men, among them Hawley, from throughout Connecticut. Ordered to assemble in Danbury, Connecticut, to prepare to take the field, they went into camp in Peekskill, New York, soon after. They served during the summer and fall of 1777 along the Hudson River under the command of General Israel Putnam. On November 14, 1777, they were ordered to join General George Washington's main army in Pennsylvania, where they engaged in the sharp action of the Battle of White Marsh on December 8. The unit lost many officers and men killed or wounded in the battle.

=== Valley Forge, Pennsylvania ===
Nero Hawley spent the winter of 1777–1778 at Valley Forge, Pennsylvania, under the command of General Washington. He was a private in Captain James Beebe's Company, within General Jedediah Huntington's Brigade of the 2nd Connecticut Regiment, 1st Connecticut Division. On March 12, 1778, the parish of North Stratford, now Trumbull, Connecticut, made donations of provisions for those residents serving in the southern army stationed at Valley Forge. Three of the fifteen men serving there from North Stratford were Hawley's: Abraham, Nathan, and Nero. During the harsh winter encampment, Nero Hawley answered seven roll calls between December 1777 and June 1778.

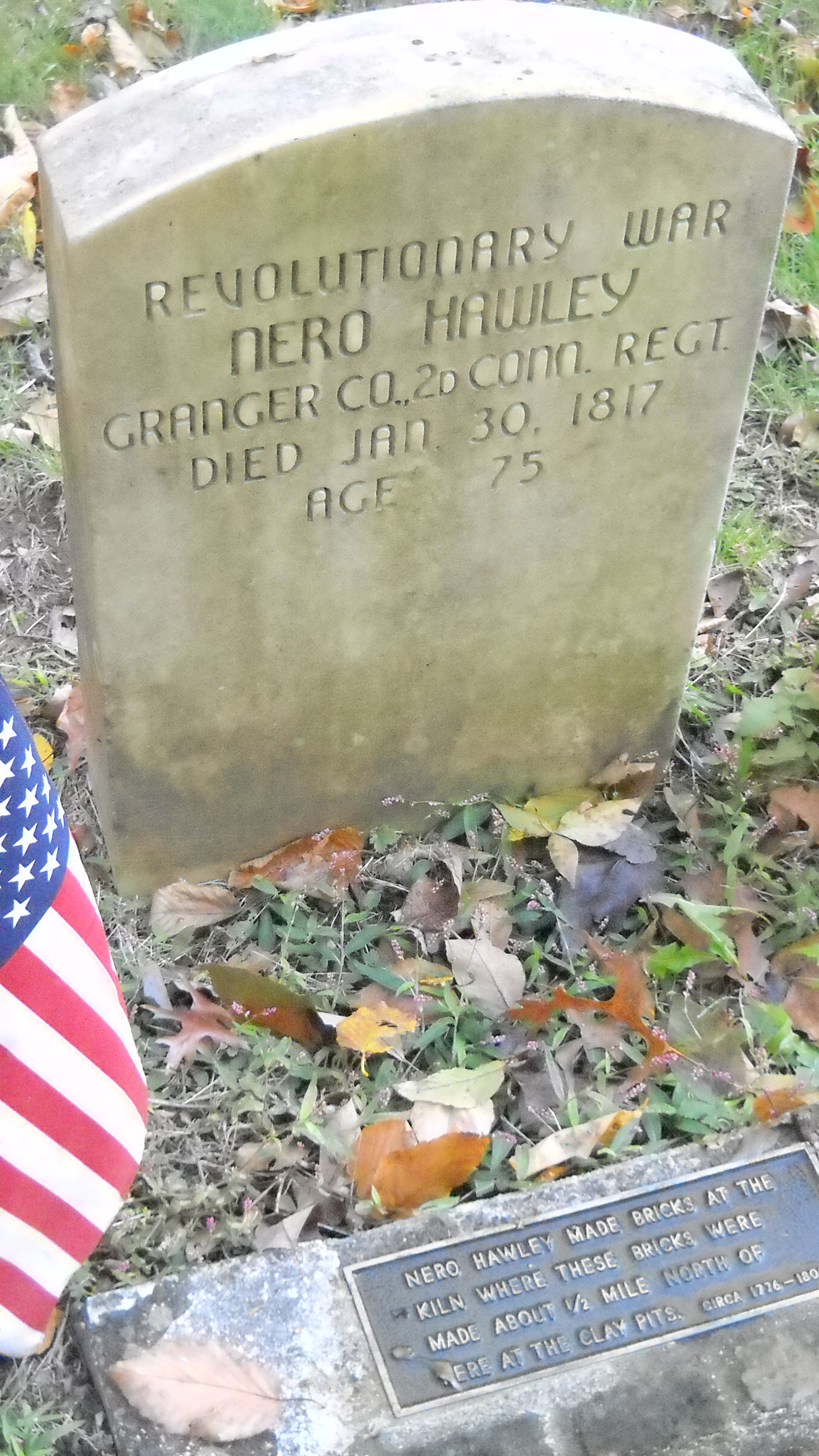
Nero Hawley Grave Riverside Cemetery

=== Battle of Monmouth ===
On July 28, 1778, Hawley fought in the Battle of Monmouth in New Jersey. Hawley was assigned to the 2nd Connecticut Brigade commanded by Huntington and camped at White Plains before spending the winter of 1778–1779 with the division at Redding, Connecticut. He served on the east side of the Hudson River in General William Heath's wing during the operations of 1779 and with the Light Company under Captain Ten Eyck. He was then detached to Colonel Return J. Meigs' Light Regiment and engaged the enemy at the Battle of Stony Point on July 15, 1779. He wintered during 1779–1780 at Morristown, New Jersey, serving on the outposts. In 1780, he served with the main army along the Hudson River and wintered at Camp Connecticut Village above the Robinson House during 1780–1781.

== Private life ==
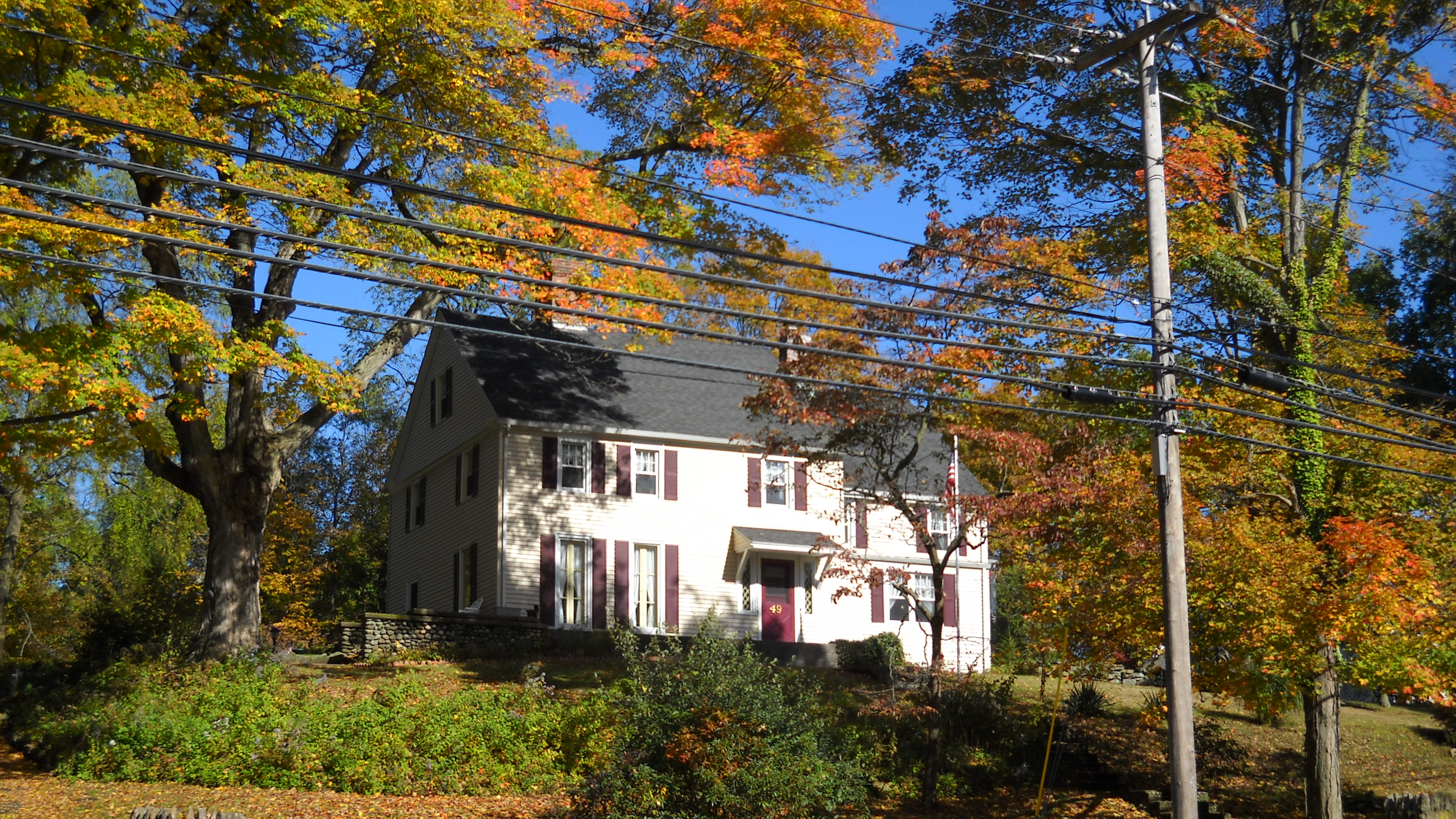
Daniel Hawley House, c. 1756

Nero married Peg, the slave servant of the Unity Parish pastor, Reverend James Beebe, in 1761. They raised seven children, five born before Nero enlisted in the army. Hawley was emancipated in 1782, but the children born to Nero and Peg remained the property of Reverend Beebe. Two children were listed in Beebe's inventory of his estate after he died in 1785. Nero formally emancipated all four children in 1801 when they were 26 and 34.

After the war, Hawley became a brickmaker. On March 14, 1791, Hawley, described in the old North Stratford Ecclesiastical Society book as a "free Negro man", withdrew with others from the Congregational Society of North Stratford and became a member of the Episcopal Church at Ripton, now Huntington. On May 26, 1808, Hawley's pension was increased to $3.33 per month. He received a final pension increase to $40 per year in 1813. Nero Hawley died in 1817 at the age of 75, and is buried in the Riverside Cemetery in Trumbull Center.

== Descendants ==
Nero's grandsons Grant and Peter Hawley were named trustees of the Zion Colored Methodist Episcopal Church in June 1835 when the church purchased land on Broad Street in Bridgeport, Connecticut, to construct a church building. The church, now known as the Walter's Memorial African Methodist Episcopal Zion Church, is the oldest black church in Bridgeport and celebrated its 175th anniversary in 2010.

== See also ==
- David Hawley
- Joseph Hawley
- Ephraim Hawley House
- History of Trumbull, Connecticut
- List of slaves
