= Kaatz Icehouse =

- Formerly listed on the U.S. National Register of Historic Places
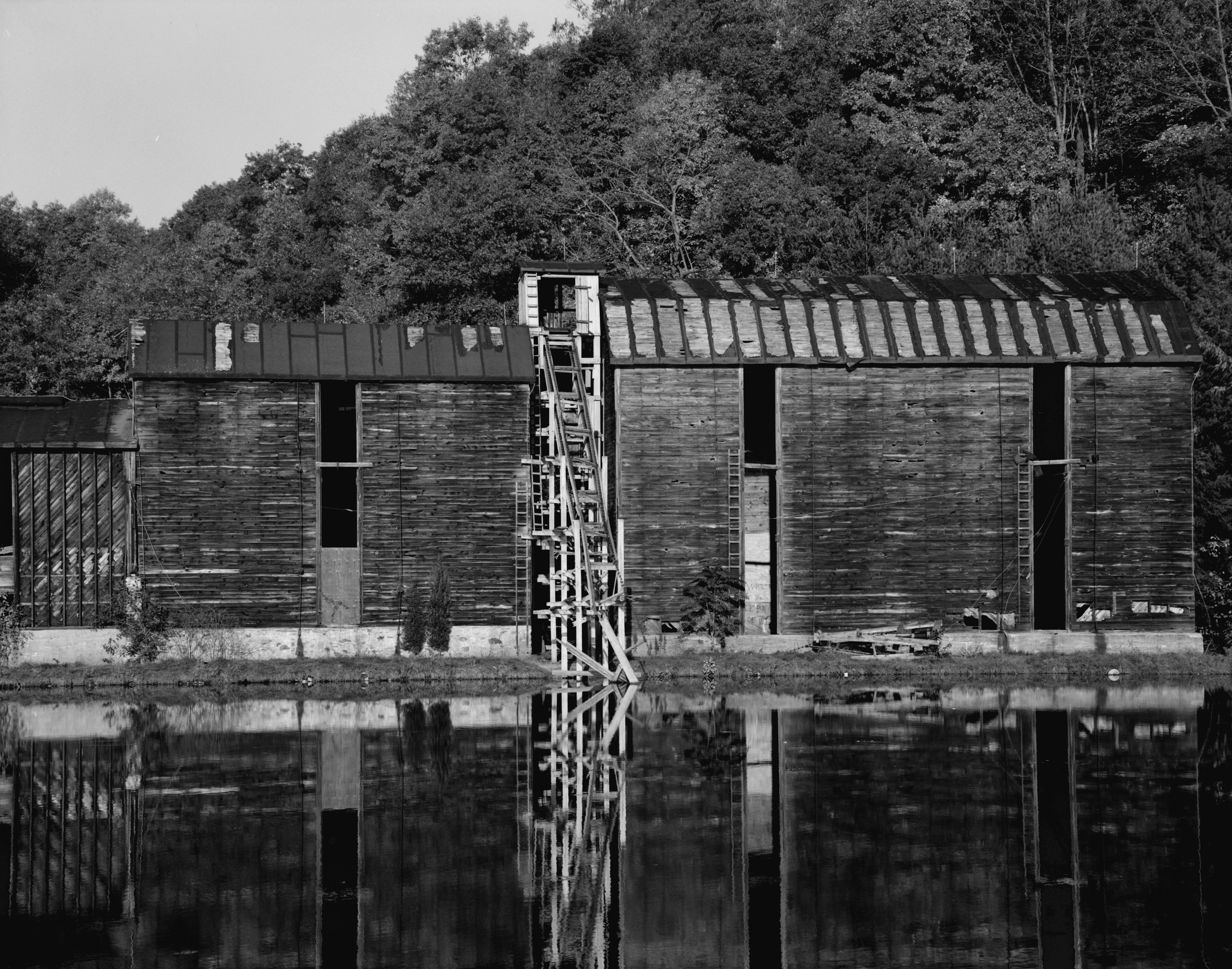

- Location within Connecticut Location within the United States
- Location: 255 Whitney Avenue, Trumbull, Connecticut
- Coordinates: 41°17′0″N 73°13′3″W
- Area: 22 acres (8.9 ha)
- Built: 1908
- Demolished: 1978
- NRHP reference No.: 77001395

Significant dates
- Added to NRHP: September 19, 1977
- Removed from NRHP: October 19, 2009

The Kaatz Icehouse was a historic ice cutting facility located on the shore of Kaatz Pond, off Whitney Avenue in Trumbull, Connecticut. Built in 1908, it served in this role until 1955, and was believed to be one of the last surviving structures of this type in the state. It was listed on the National Register of Historic Places in 1977. Following its demolition in 1978, it was delisted in 2009.

It was a wood-framed structure, built in 1908 by Ernest Kaatz, who ran an ice harvesting operation between 1908 and 1955. The building was added to the National Register of Historic Places on September 19, 1977. It was razed in 1978 due to deterioration. The local historical society claims it was the last icehouse standing in New England.

== Gallery ==
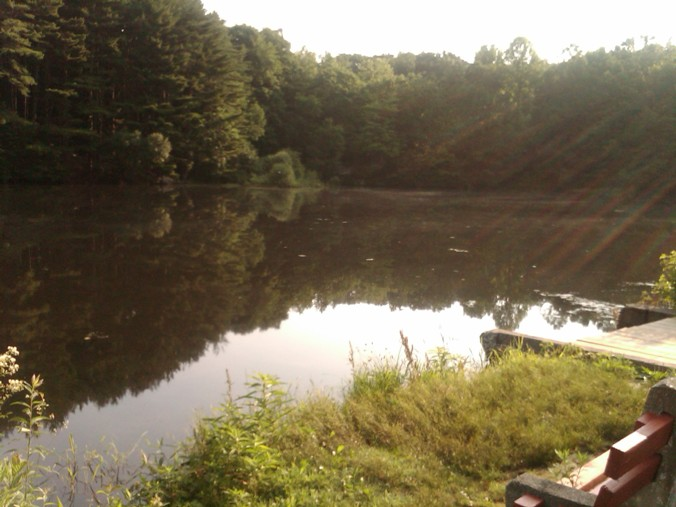
Kaatz Pond, from which the ice was harvested in the winter.

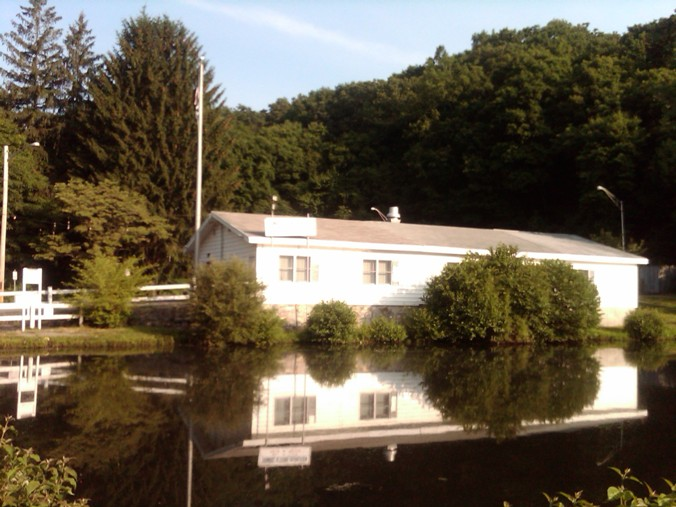
The VFW and parking lot are built over the site of the old icehouse.

== See also ==
- Thompson Icehouse in Maine
- National Register of Historic Places listings in Fairfield County, Connecticut
