= St. Catherine of Siena Church (Trumbull, Connecticut) =

Coordinates: 41°14′52.10″N 73°09′23.71″W

St. Catherine of Siena Parish
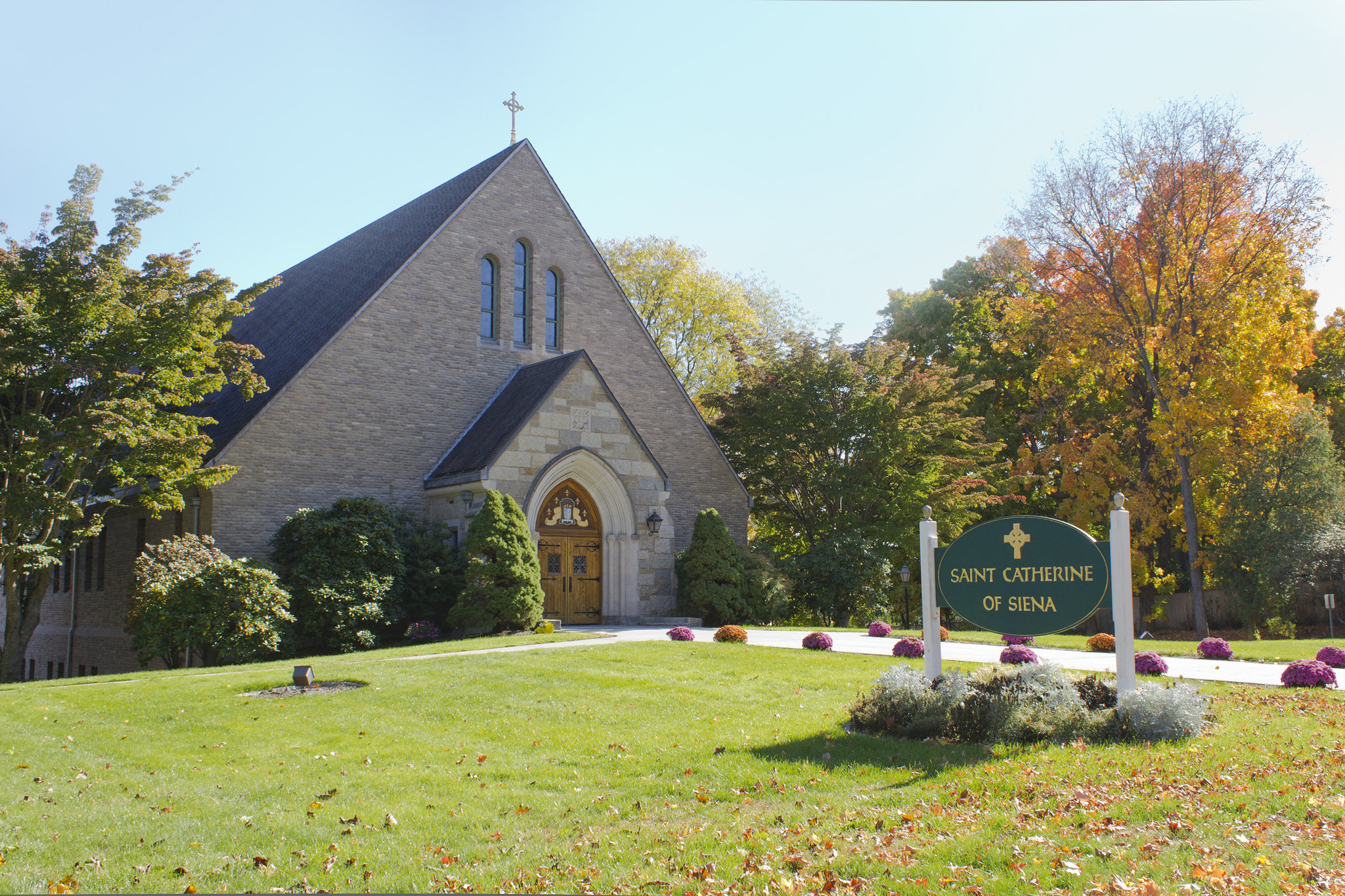
- St. Catherine of Siena Parish
- Location: 220 Shelton Road; Trumbull, Connecticut
- Country: United States
- Denomination: Roman Catholic

Administration
- Province: Hartford
- Diocese: Bridgeport

Clergy
- Bishop: Most Reverend Frank J. Caggiano
- Priest(s): Father Joseph A. Marcello, Father Joseph O. Ocran

St. Catherine of Siena is a Roman Catholic parish in Trumbull, Connecticut, part of the Diocese of Bridgeport.

== History ==
Trumbull, Connecticut, where the parish is located, is today within the territory of the Roman Catholic Diocese of Bridgeport, which was established by Pope Pius XII in 1953, which comprises all of Fairfield County, in southwestern Connecticut. Prior to that, it was part of the Diocese of Hartford, established in 1843 by Pope Gregory XVI, which then comprised all of Connecticut. Earlier still, it had been part of the Diocese of Boston, established in 1808 by Pope Pius VII, whose territory at the time encompassed all of New England. And originally, when the Catholic Church was first being organized in the United States, Trumbull was part of the territory of the Archdiocese of Baltimore, established in 1789 by Pope Pius VI, which, as the first Catholic diocese in the United States, comprised, at the time, the entire territory of the young and growing nation.

On February 11, 1955, the Most Reverend Lawrence J. Shehan, the first Bishop of Bridgeport, canonically established a new Parish, to be located in the “Nichols” section of Trumbull, territory which until then had been part of the Parish of Saint Charles Borromeo in Bridgeport. Bishop Shehan appointed Father Edward D. Halloran to be the first Pastor of this new parish, which is thought to have been named for Saint Catherine of Siena in honor of Father Halloran's mother, Mrs. Catherine Halloran.

With the assistance of Father Thomas B. Gloster, Pastor of St. Charles Borromeo Parish, the Diocese of Bridgeport had purchased some 11 acres of land and two houses on Shelton Road in Trumbull. This was to be the site of a parish church and campus. While arrangements were being made for Sunday Masses to be offered within the Parish boundaries, Masses were offered for one month at the Thomas Hooker School in Bridgeport, beginning on February 20, 1955. Beginning on March 20, 1955, with the permission of the Trumbull School Board, Mass was offered at Nichols School for over three years.

As plans for the church progressed, Bishop Shehan arranged for the Most Reverend Fulton J. Sheen, the celebrated author, television personality, and host of the award-winning television show Life is Worth Living, to present a lecture on March 22, 1957, at the Shakespeare Festival Theater in Stratford, the proceeds of which benefitted the Church Building Fund for Saint Catherine of Siena Parish.

This lecture was so successful that Bishop Shehan and Father Halloran, in gratitude, designated the sanctuary of Saint Catherine of Siena Church as a gift of Bishop Sheen. Then an Auxiliary Bishop of New York and National Director of the Society for the Propagation of the Faith, Bishop Sheen went on to serve as Bishop of Rochester, New York, and later as Titular Archbishop of Newport. He died on December 9, 1979, and is interred in the crypt of Saint Patrick's Cathedral in New York City. His cause for beatification and canonization has been introduced.

Ground was broken for a parish church in August 1957, the year which appears on the church's cornerstone. The church was designed in the Norman Gothic style by architect J. Gerald Phelan. Its stained glass windows – depicting Apostles, Religious Founders, and the patron saints of the Catholic churches in the City of Bridgeport – were fashioned in Brussels, Belgium by the firm of J. Vosch.

The church was constructed by the E&F Construction Company of Bridgeport, and dedicated on September 21, 1958. The Mass was celebrated by Father Halloran, with Father John J. Bennett as Deacon and Father Daniel J. Foley as Subdeacon; the homilist was Father Joseph A. Heffernan. The Fairfield University Alumni Glee Club served as the choir for the Mass, and the organist was Father Thomas A. Murphy, S.J. Bishop Shehan was present in choro for the Mass.

=== Further expansion ===
As the years unfolded, the Parish of Saint Catherine of Siena grew and expanded. Recognizing the importance of handing on the gift of the Catholic Faith to new generations, by 1964 the parish had grown to the point that a school could be considered. Father Halloran secured a commitment from the School Sisters of Notre Dame to teach at the school – a service which continued until the retirement of the school's longest-serving Principal, Sister Anne Marie Dorff, S.S.N.D., who led the school from 1978 until 2009.

In 1964, construction began simultaneously on the school building and on the parish rectory, both of which were designed by William F. Griffin, AIA, a Saint Catherine's parishioner. In September 1965, the first three classes of Saint Catherine of Siena School began: Grades 1, 2, and 7, with 71 students enrolled, originally meeting in the Church Hall. Two more classes were added in 1966, when the school building was completed. Two more classes were added in 1967, and the school reached its full capacity of eight grades and 250 students in 1968. Kindergarten was added in 1975.

In April 1967, Monsignor John F. McGough was named the second Pastor of Saint Catherine of Siena Parish by the Most Reverend Walter W. Curtis, the second Bishop of Bridgeport. Msgr. McGough was followed nine years later by a third Pastor, Father Richard J. Monahan, who was also appointed by Bishop Curtis, and who served Saint Catherine's until his retirement from active ministry in 1991.

The 1970s and 1980s saw continued growth, together with the completion of several special projects, including an addition to Saint Catherine of Siena School in 1987, designed by parishioner Alfred Szymanski, AIA, of Fletcher Thompson, and built by the P. Francini Construction Company of Derby, Connecticut. Additionally, during this period, a new side parking lot was installed, the church was air conditioned, and the mortgages of the church and the school were retired.

=== Pastorate of Msgr. Shea ===
In July 1991, Monsignor Richard J. Shea was installed as the fourth Pastor of Saint Catherine of Siena Parish. Appointed to serve the Parish by then-Bishop Edward M. Egan, Msgr. Shea had served since 1976 as Principal of the nearby St. Joseph High School. Msgr. Shea's 23-year pastorate saw enormous expansion and improvement.

Soon after Msgr. Shea's arrival, a new roof was installed on the church, as well as new exterior doors. The stained glass windows were restored, and the Church Hall was upgraded. Saint Catherine of Siena School was completely refurbished, and a Pre-K classroom was added. In 1996, “Project Renovare” was undertaken, a major initiative of a liturgical renovation in the church, together with the addition of a side chapel.

On March 19, 2001, the Solemnity of Saint Joseph, the Most Reverend William E. Lori, until then an auxiliary bishop of Washington, was installed as the fourth Bishop of Bridgeport in ceremonies held at Sacred Heart University in Fairfield. The following day, at 7:30 a.m., Bishop Lori celebrated his first parish Mass in the Diocese of Bridgeport at Saint Catherine's. His parents, Frank and Margaret Lori, of Clarksville, Indiana, who were still in Connecticut for the Installation celebrations, were among the attendees.

In May 2011, Msgr. Shea celebrated the 50th anniversary of his priestly ordination with a Mass of Thanksgiving at Saint Catherine's, which was attended by Bishop Lori. Three years later, on the occasion of his retirement from active ministry, a grateful parish presented Msgr. Shea with a new car, together with a specially crafted Altar, for his use in the celebration of daily Mass in his retirement.

On the occasion of his 80th birthday, in April 2016, Msgr. Shea returned to St. Catherine's for a celebratory Mass, during which the Marian Prayer Garden on the church grounds was dedicated in his honor.

=== New beginnings ===
On September 19, 2013, His Excellency the Most Reverend Frank J. Caggiano, until then an auxiliary bishop of Brooklyn, was installed as the fifth Bishop of Bridgeport, during a Mass celebrated at Saint Theresa Church in Trumbull. The receptions before and after his Installation Mass were held at the McClinch Family Center, here at Saint Catherine’s. These receptions were attended by thousands of the faithful and other honored guests, by hundreds of priests from the Dioceses of Bridgeport and Brooklyn and beyond, and by over thirty bishops, including the Apostolic Nuncio to the United States of America.

On March 15, 2015, Father Joseph A. Marcello was installed as the fifth Pastor of Saint Catherine of Siena Parish.

== Gallery ==
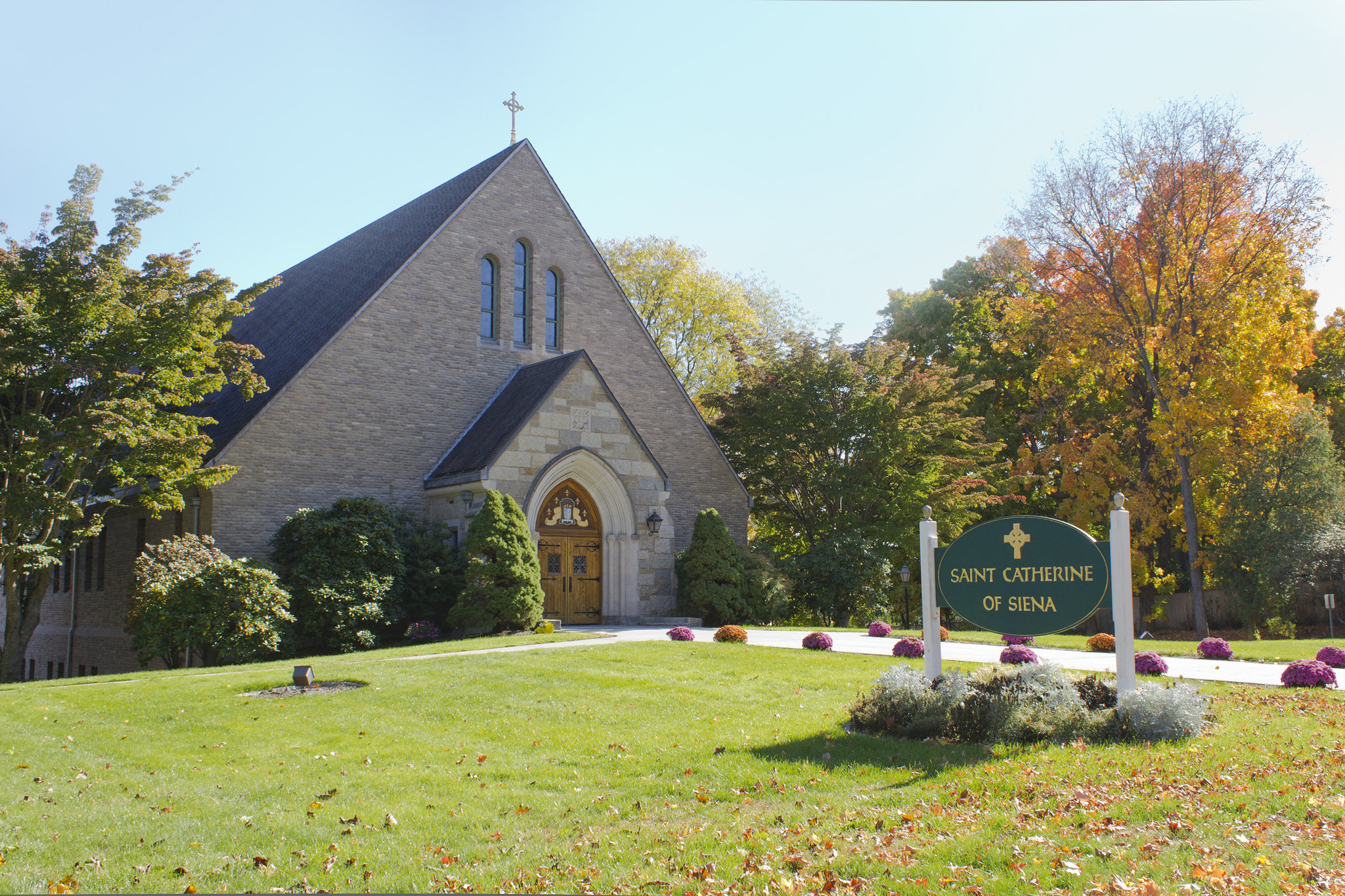
The Parish of St. Catherine of Siena

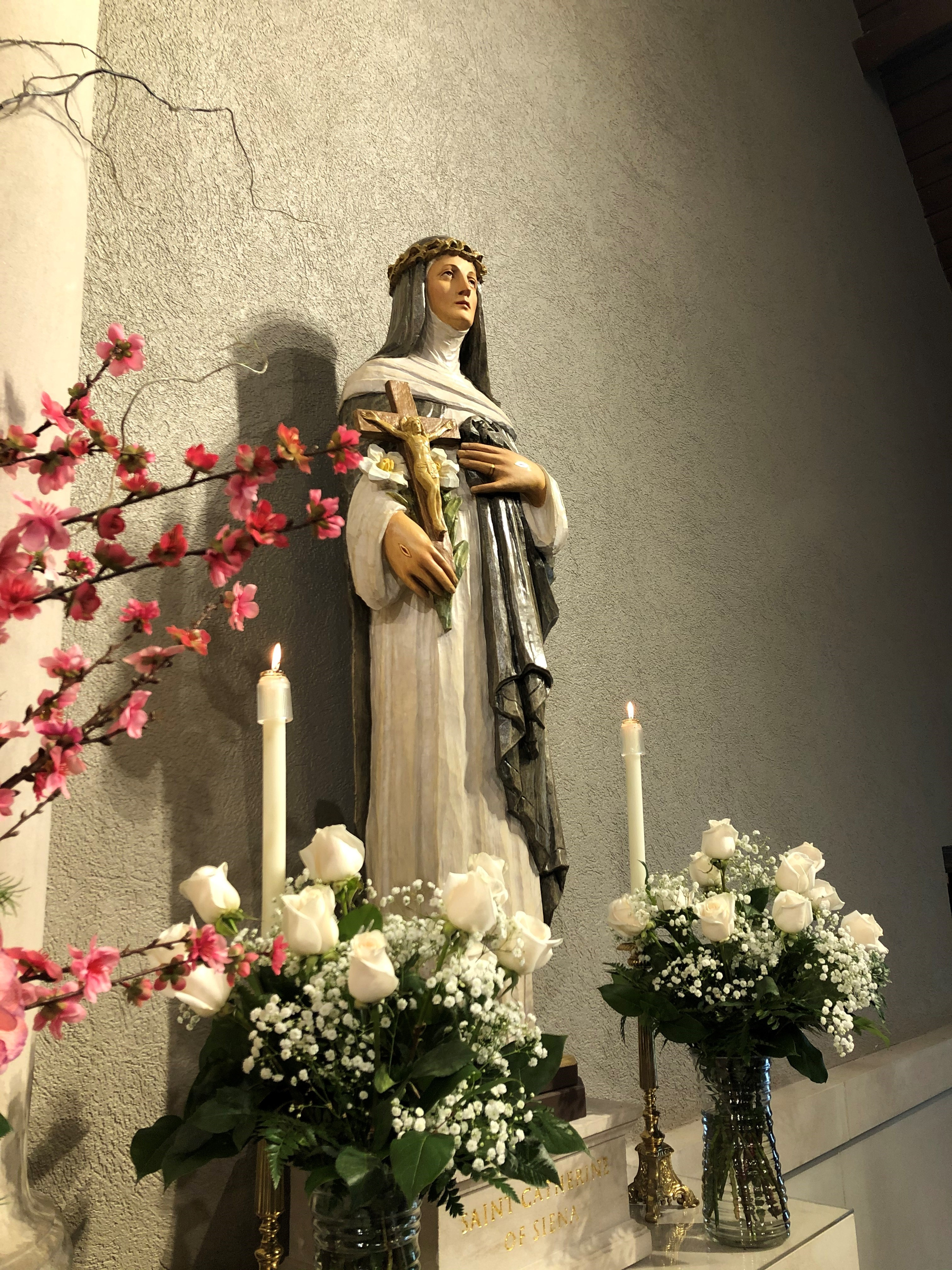
A statue of St. Catherine of Siena

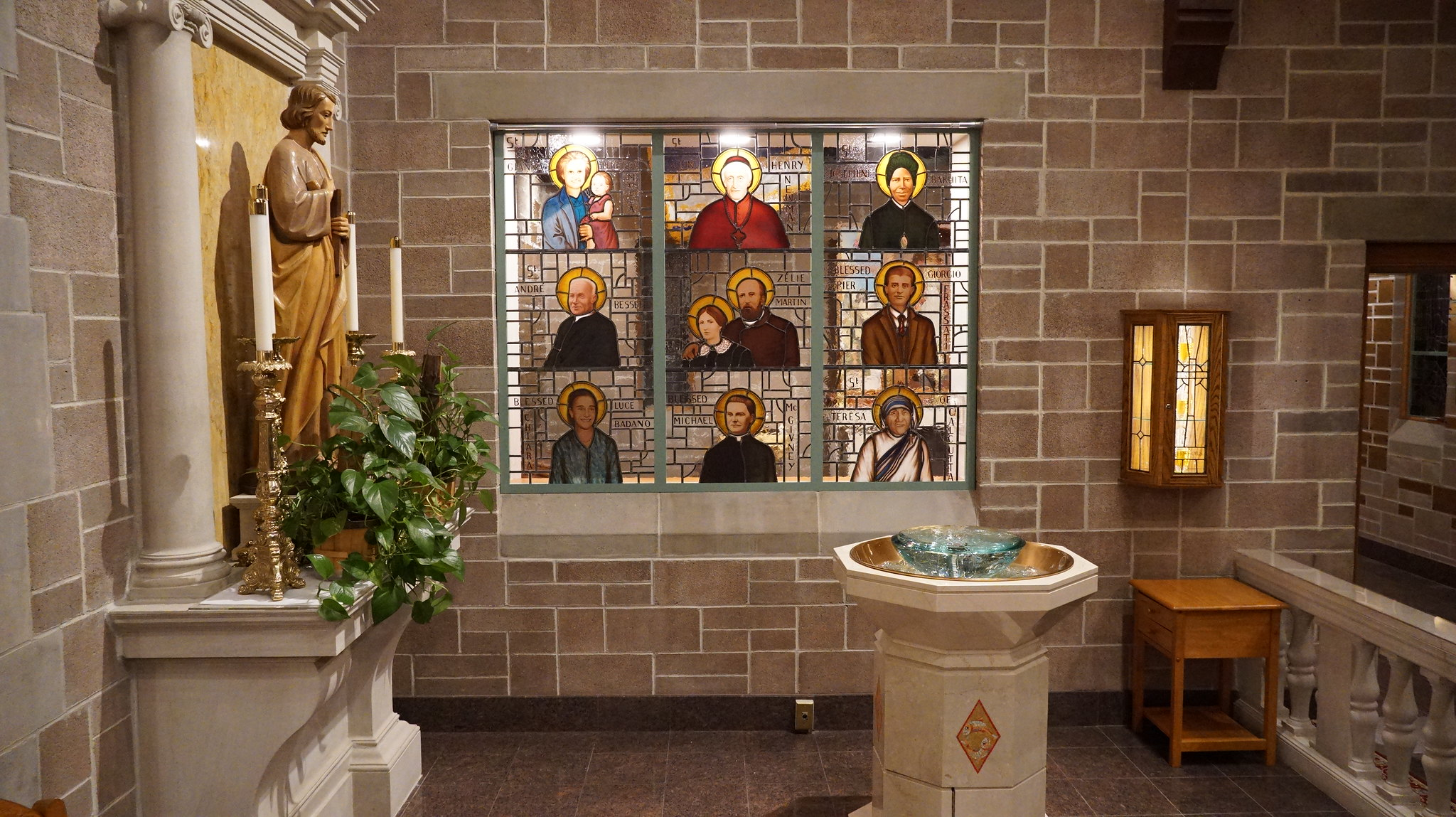
A stained glass window depicting 10 Saints and Blesseds who have lived in recent centuries, and who represent all the states of life in the Church

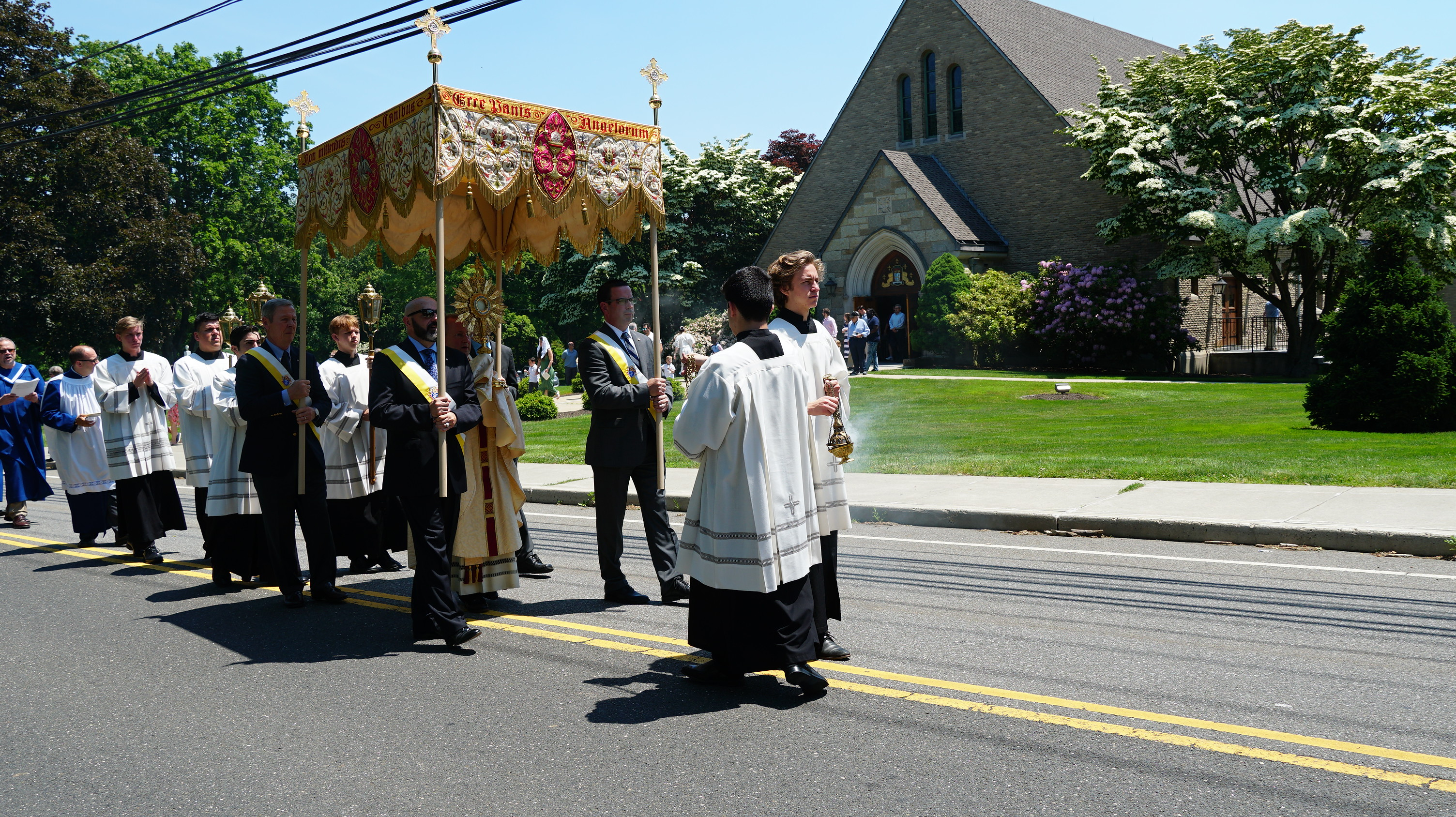
The Eucharistic Procession on the Solemnity of the Most Holy Body and Blood of Christ, Corpus Christi. June 2021.

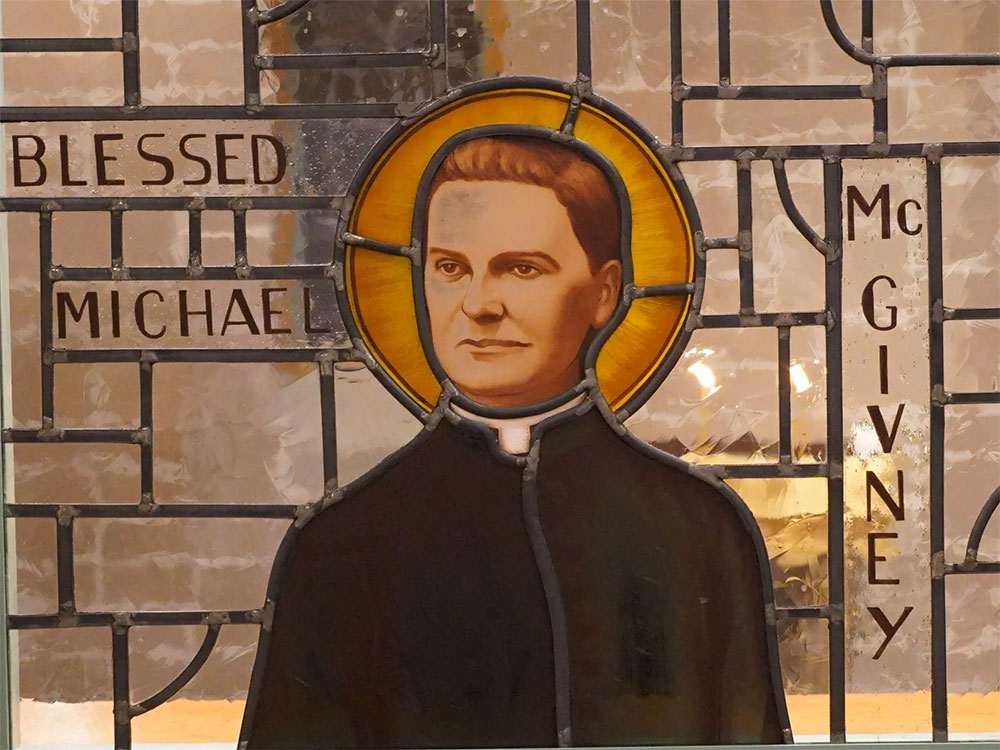
A stained glass window of Blessed Michael McGivney, founder of the Knights of Columbus

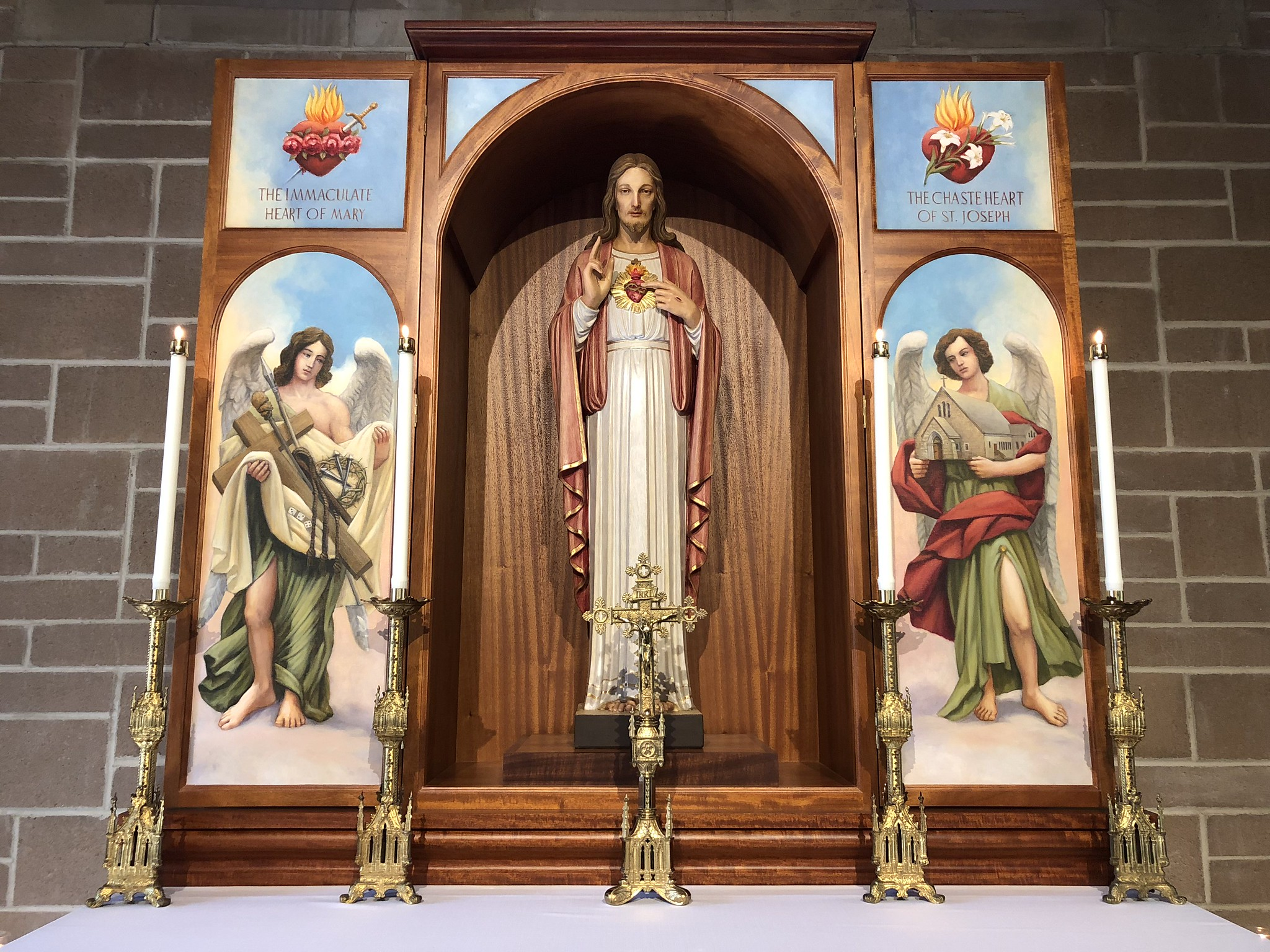
Statue of the Sacred Heart of Jesus

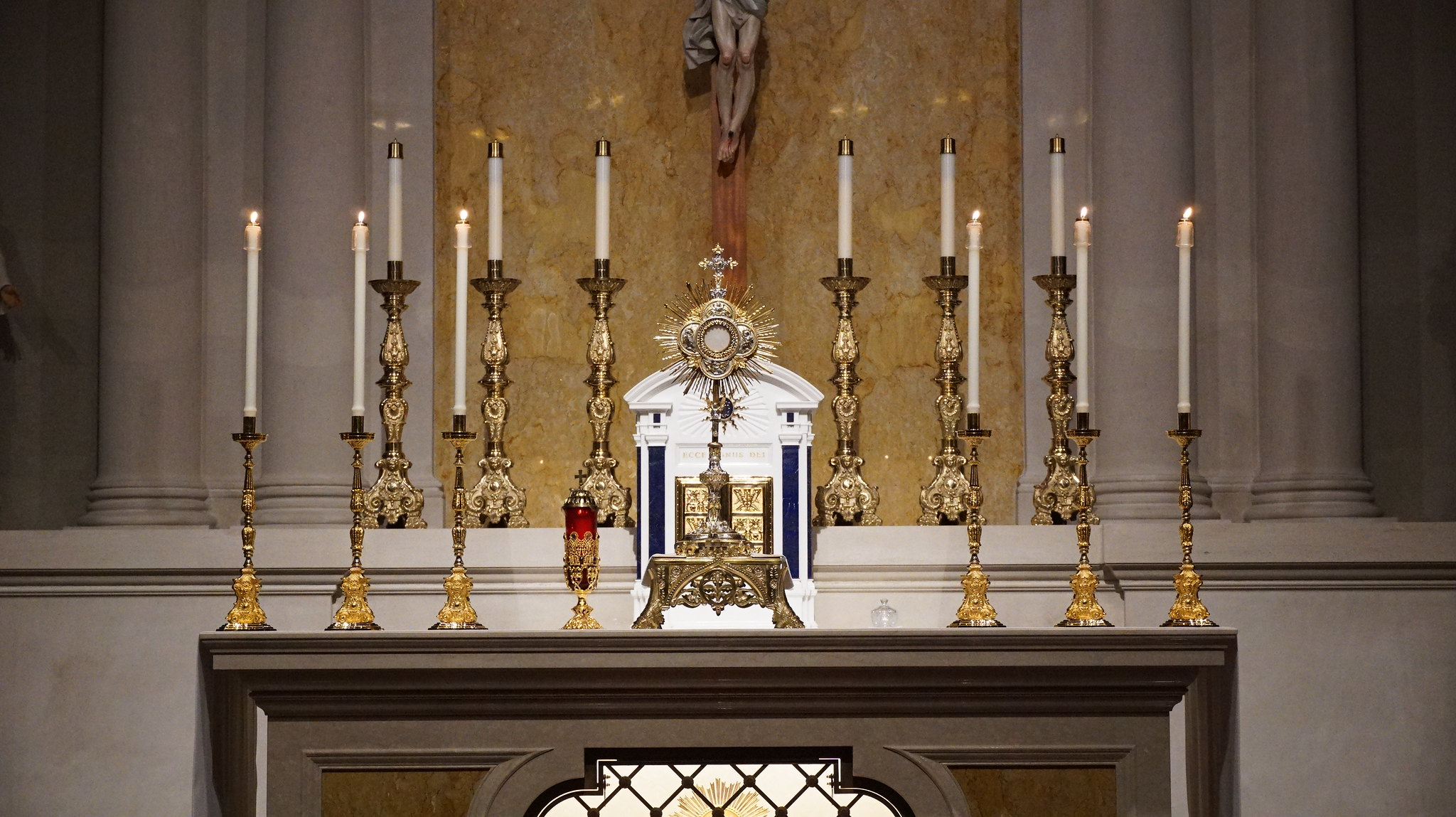
Eucharistic Adoration during 40 Hours Devotion. Lent 2022.
