= Trumbull Center, Connecticut =

Census-designated place in Connecticut, United States

- Census-designated place
- Location within Connecticut Location within the United States
- Coordinates: 41°14′39″N 73°11′45″W
- Country: United States
- State: Connecticut
- County: Fairfield
- Town: Trumbull

Area
  - Total: 5.81 sq mi (15.04 km^{2})
  - Land: 5.70 sq mi (14.77 km^{2})
  - Water: 0.10 sq mi (0.27 km^{2})
- Elevation: 115 ft (35 m)
- Time zone: UTC-5 (Eastern (EST))
  - Summer (DST): UTC-4 (EDT)
- ZIP Code: 06611 (Trumbull)
- Area codes: 203/475
- FIPS code: 09-77278
- GNIS feature ID: 2805069

Trumbull Center is a section or neighborhood of the town of Trumbull in Fairfield County, Connecticut in New England. It is considered the center of the town, and was the seat of town government from 1883 through 1957. The Pequonnock River flows through the center in an easterly direction. The main thoroughfare is Connecticut Route 127 (aka Church Hill Road & White Plains Road).

The area was listed as a census-designated place (CDP) prior to the 2020 census. As of the 2020 census, Trumbull Center had a population of 9,746.

== Demographics ==
=== 2020 census ===
As of the 2020 census, Trumbull Center had a population of 9,746. The median age was 41.5 years. 24.8% of residents were under the age of 18 and 18.8% of residents were 65 years of age or older. For every 100 females there were 87.9 males, and for every 100 females age 18 and over there were 84.7 males age 18 and over.

100.0% of residents lived in urban areas, while 0.0% lived in rural areas.

There were 3,490 households in Trumbull Center, of which 37.0% had children under the age of 18 living in them. Of all households, 59.0% were married-couple households, 13.0% were households with a male householder and no spouse or partner present, and 24.1% were households with a female householder and no spouse or partner present. About 23.2% of all households were made up of individuals and 15.0% had someone living alone who was 65 years of age or older.

There were 3,702 housing units, of which 5.7% were vacant. The homeowner vacancy rate was 0.8% and the rental vacancy rate was 10.0%.

Racial composition as of the 2020 census
Race	Number	Percent
White	6,845	70.2%
Black or African American	835	8.6%
American Indian and Alaska Native	14	0.1%
Asian	686	7.0%
Native Hawaiian and Other Pacific Islander	0	0.0%
Some other race	533	5.5%
Two or more races	833	8.5%
Hispanic or Latino (of any race)	1,245	12.8%

== Commerce ==
The center contains a class B-C retail area featuring banks, coffee shops, gas stations, professional services, and restaurants, mostly within the central located Trumbull Shopping Center.

== Notable locations ==
- The Helen Plumb Building at 571 Church Hill Road was Trumbull's former town hall from 1883 through 1957.
- Riverside Cemetery. A cemetery dating back to the American Revolution. It is also a site of the CT Freedom Trail as Colonial soldier Nero Hawley was buried here.
- Twin Brooks Park
- Pequonnock River Valley State Park
- Beach Memorial Park

== Public safety ==
The neighborhood is patrolled by the Trumbull Police Department.

Fire safety for the neighborhood is provided by the Trumbull Center Fire Department. Two firehouses, one on White Plains Road and one at the top of Daniels Farm Road.

== Transportation ==
The main thoroughfare is Connecticut Route 127 (Church Hill Road & White Plains Road), which is accessible via Connecticut Route 15, Connecticut Route 25 or Daniel's Farm Road.

The Pequonnock River bike lane and trail network system is an alternative and efficient method for walkers and cyclists to navigate to the Center quickly.

Bus service is provided by Greater Bridgeport Transit Authority's route 19X with multiple stops.
