= Christian Heritage School (Connecticut) =

School in Trumbull, Connecticut

Coordinates: 41°14′21″N 73°11′04″W

- Trumbull, Connecticut; United States

Information
- Type: Private, non-denominational, college preparatory Christian school
- Website: https://www.christianheritageschool.org/

Christian Heritage School is a private, non-denominational, college preparatory Christian school in Trumbull, Connecticut, providing education to students from kindergarten through 12th grade.

== History ==
Christian Heritage School was founded in Trumbull, Connecticut in 1977. It enrolls about 450 students. Founded as an independent Christian school, it is not affiliated with a particular church or denomination. There are approximately 90 local churches from 36 surrounding towns represented in the student body.

== Academics ==
The school is accredited through NEASC (New England Association of Schools and Colleges) since 1985, and is a member of the ACSI (Association of Christian Schools International) since 1977.

All students attending Christian Heritage School are required to take a Bible class corresponding to their grade level and attend weekly chapel services. Graduation requirements are: 3.5 credits of Bible, 4 credits of Math, 4 credits of English, 3 credits of Science, 3 credits of Social Studies, 2 credits of World Language, 3 credits of Electives, and a half credit each of Physical Ed and Health. High school students are also required to complete 80 total hours of community service. High school students may take up to 16 college-credit courses through Advanced Placement, UConn ECE, Seton Hall University, and Syracuse University.

== Athletics ==
The athletic program has 20 middle and high school teams, 11 of which are varsity sports. 70% of all secondary students participate on an interscholastic athletic team. League and conference affiliations are: Western New England Preparatory School Athletic Association (WNEPSAA), Housatonic Valley Athletic League (HVAL), New England Preparatory School Athletic Conference (NEPSAC), and National Christian School Athletic Association (NCSAA).

== International programs ==
Beginning in 2008, the school received SEVP certification to enroll international students and has since enrolled students from China, Korea, Japan, Thailand, Germany, England, France, Slovakia, Poland, Hungary, Mexico, Guatemala, and Peru. Beginning in 2014, the school has offered semester abroad programs in Thailand, Poland, and China.

Spiritual formation in middle and high school include fall overnight retreats and spiritual emphasis week. Summer mission programs are organized for middle and high school students to perform community service outside of the Connecticut area. In 2019, students traveled to Guatemala and Uganda, as well as Philadelphia.

== Notable alumni ==
- Alyssa Naeher, soccer player
