= Trumbull, Connecticut =

Town in Fairfield County, Connecticut, US

- Town
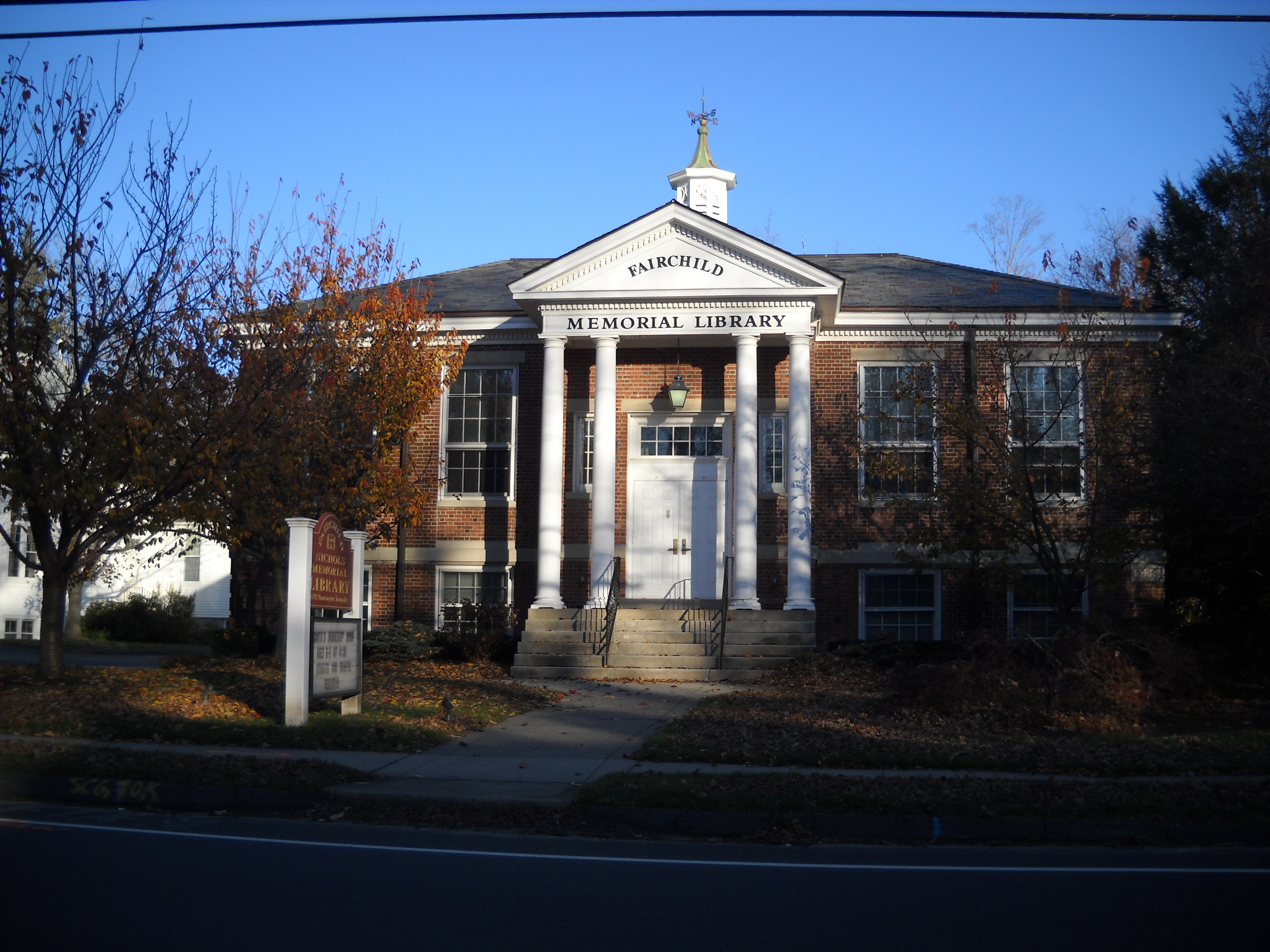
- The Fairchild Nichols Memorial Library

- Flag Seal
- Motto: Pride in our Past, Faith in our Future
- Coordinates: 41°13′59″N 73°13′6″W
- Country: United States
- State: Connecticut
- County: Fairfield
- Region: CT Metropolitan
- Settled: 1639 as Stratford
- Incorporated: 1797 as Trumbull

Government
  - Type: First selectman-Town council
  - First Selectman: Vicki Tesoro (D)
  - Town Council: Michael Buswell (R); Mary Isaac (D); Dede Robinson (R); Bill Mecca (D); Nicole Satin (D); Donna Seidell (R); Kevin Shively (D); Thomas Whitmoyer (D); Tony Scinto (R); Jason Marsh (D); Stephen Choi (R); Alissa Hall (D); Kelly Mallozzi (D); Dawn Cantafio (D); Joy Colón (D); Lissette Colon (R); Ashley Gaudiano (D); Olga Leiva (R); Stephen Lemoine (R); Christopher DeCruze (R); Carl Massaro, Jr. (R)

Area
  - Total: 23.5 sq mi (60.9 km^{2})
  - Land: 23.3 sq mi (60.3 km^{2})
  - Water: 0.23 sq mi (0.6 km^{2})
- Elevation: 266 ft (81 m)

Population (2020)
  - Total: 36,827
  - Density: 1,580.6/sq mi (610.3/km^{2})
- Time zone: UTC−5 (Eastern)
  - Summer (DST): UTC−4 (Eastern)
- ZIP Code: 06611
- Area codes: 203/475
- FIPS code: 09-77200
- GNIS feature ID: 0213518
- Website: www.trumbull-ct.gov

Trumbull is a town located in Fairfield County, Connecticut, United States. The town is part of the Greater Bridgeport Planning Region, and borders on the cities of Bridgeport and Shelton, as well as the towns of Stratford, Fairfield, Easton and Monroe. The population was 36,827 during the 2020 census. The Trumbull area was the home of the Golden Hill Paugussett Indian Nation for thousands of years before the English settlement was made in 1639.

After independence, the successful American Yankees named the town after one of their own, Jonathan Trumbull (1710–1785), a merchant, Patriot (American soldier) and statesman. Aviation pioneer Igor Sikorsky lived in Trumbull during his active years, when he designed, built, and flew fixed-wing aircraft and put the helicopter into mass production for the first time.

== History ==
The area comprising the town of Trumbull was occupied by the Paugusset Indian nation for thousands of years before English colonists arrived here during the Great Migration from England and established the town of Stratford, Connecticut, in 1639.

In 1725, Stratford residents living in the northern part of the town petitioned the Colony of Connecticut to establish their own separate village. They wished to call their new village Nickol's Farms, after the family who lived in its center. However, the Colony named it Unity instead. The village of Unity merged with the village to its west called Long Hill (organized in 1740), to form the town of "North Stratford" in 1744.

In the late 1780s, North Stratford began to petition the Connecticut General Assembly seeking independence from Stratford. The Assembly finally granted full town rights in October 1797 and named the new town after Jonathan Trumbull (1710–1785), a merchant, patriot, statesman and slave owner when it was incorporated in 1797. Aviation pioneer Igor Sikorsky lived in Trumbull during his active years when he designed, built, and flew fixed-wing aircraft and put the helicopter into mass production for the first time.

== Geography ==
=== Bodies of water ===
The Pequonnock River is the only major waterway in Trumbull, beginning northwest of Old Mine Park at the Monroe border and flowing southeasterly through the Pequonnock River Valley State Park, Trumbull Center and Twin Brooks Park. The river leaves Trumbull and continues into Beardsley Park in Bridgeport.

Major bodies of water include Canoe Brook Lake, Pinewood Lake, Tashua Hills Golf Club Pond, and the six Twin Brooks Park ponds. Minor bodies of water include Curtiss (Secret) Pond, Dogwood Lake, Frog Pond, Kaatz Pond, Kaechele Pond, Porters Pond, Thrush Wood Lake and Unity Park Pond.

=== Land ===
According to the United States Census Bureau, the town has a total area of 23.5 square miles (61 km^{2}), of which 23.3 square miles (60 km^{2}) is land and 0.2 square miles (0.52 km^{2}), or 1.0%, is water. According to the U.S. Geological Survey in 1986, the lowest point in town is approximately 40 feet (12 m) above sea level at Beach Park. The highest point is the top of Monitor Hill at 615 feet (187 m) above sea level.

According to the U.S. Geological Society, at 615 ft Monitor Hill (Tashua Hill) in Trumbull is the highest coastal point on the east coast of the United States. It is marked with a plaque on Monitor Hill Road.

=== Parks ===
Trumbull has 871.23 acres (3.5257 km^{2}) of park facilities. These areas include:

- Abraham Nichols Park/Wood's Estate (13.8 acres (56,000 m^{2}))
- Aldo Memorial Park (Westwind Road) (7.0 acres (28,000 m^{2}))
- Robert G. Beach Memorial Park (331.0 acres (1.340 km^{2}))
- Davidow Park (15.2 acres (62,000 m^{2}))
- Great Oak Park (69.9 acres (283,000 m^{2}))
- Gunther Pond Park (1.3 acres (5,300 m^{2}))
- Indian Ledge Park (104.6 acres (0.423 km^{2}))
- Island Brook Park (47.0 acres (190,000 m^{2}))
- Kaatz Pond Park ( 17.5 acres (71,000 m^{2}))
- Kaechele Soccer Fields (12.23 acres (49,500 m^{2}))
- Long Hill Green (0.1-acre (400 m^{2}))
- Middlebrooks Park (13.7 acres (55,000 m^{2}))
- Mischee Brook Park (16.6 acres (67,000 m^{2}))
- Nothnagle Memorial Field (4.0 acres (16,000 m^{2}))
- Old Mine Park (Historic Mine Area Dedication) (72.1 acres (292,000 m^{2}))
- Parlor Rock Historic Amusement Area (2.5 acres (10,000 m^{2}))
- Strawberry Brook Estates (4.4 acres (18,000 m^{2}))
- Tashua Recreation Area (20 acres (81,000 m^{2}))
- Twin Brooks Park (83.2 acres (337,000 m^{2}))
- Unity Park (35.1 acres (142,000 m^{2}))

==== State parks ====
The town of Trumbull, the Connecticut Department of Environmental Protection and the Bridgeport Hydraulic Company agreed to make a joint Town and State purchase of land in the Pequonnock River Valley in 1989. The 382-acre (155 ha) parcel cost $9,275,000 and is maintained by the Department of Environmental Protection.

=== Villages ===
- Daniels Farm
- Long Hill
- Nichols
- Tashua
- Trumbull Center

== Demographics ==
Historical population of Trumbull
Year	Pop.	±%
1800	1,291	—
1810	1,241	−3.9%
1820	1,232	−0.7%
1830	1,242	+0.8%
1840	1,204	−3.1%
1850	1,309	+8.7%
1860	1,474	+12.6%
1870	1,335	−9.4%
1880	1,323	−0.9%
1890	1,453	+9.8%
1900	1,587	+9.2%
1910	1,642	+3.5%
1920	2,597	+58.2%
1930	3,624	+39.5%
1940	5,294	+46.1%
1950	8,641	+63.2%
1960	20,379	+135.8%
1970	31,394	+54.1%
1980	32,989	+5.1%
1990	32,016	−2.9%
2000	34,243	+7.0%
2010	36,018	+5.2%
2020	36,827	+2.2%
U.S. Decennial Census; State of Connecticut; Source: U.S. Decennial Census

As of the census of 2000, there were 34,243 people, 11,911 households, and 9,707 families residing in the town. The population density was 1,470.6 inhabitants per square mile (567.8/km^{2}). There were 12,160 housing units at an average density of 522.2 per square mile (201.6/km^{2}). The racial makeup of the town was 94.0% White, 2.7% Black or African American, 0.1% Native American, 2.4% Asian, 0.7% from other races, and 0.9% from two or more races. Hispanic or Latino of any race were 1.9% of the population.

There were 11,911 households, out of which 37.5% had children under the age of 18 living within them, 71.7% were married couples living together, 7.4% had a female householder with no husband present, and 18.5% were non-families. 16.2% of all households were made up of individuals, and 9.6% had someone living alone who was 65 years of age or older. The average household size was 2.8 and the average family size was 3.2.

In the town, the population was spread out, with 26.0% under the age of 18, 5.0% from 18 to 24, 27.6% from 25 to 44, 24.1% from 45 to 64, and 17.3% who were 65 years of age or older. The median age was 40 years. For every 100 females, there were 92.7 males. For every 100 females age 18 and over, there were 88.9 males. As of the 2000 census, males had a median income of $62,201 versus $41,384 for females. The per capita income for the town was $34,931. About 1.4% of families and 2.3% of the population were below the poverty line, including 2.4% of those under age 18 and 3.6% of those over age 65.

=== 2008 estimates ===
According to the American Community Survey (ACS) 2008 estimate, there were 37,134 people, 12,338 households, and 10,021 families residing in the town. The population density was 1,593.7 people per square mile. There were 12,651 housing units (93% ownership, 7% rental) with an average density of 542.9 per square mile.

There were 12,338 households, out of which 40.9% had children under the age of 18 living within them, 69.0% were married couples living together, 7.9% had a female householder with no husband present, and 18.8% were non-families. 17.7% of all households were made up of individuals, and 11.1% had someone living alone who was 65 years of age or older. The average household size was 2.90 and the average family size was 3.31.

In the town, the population includes 25.5% under the age of 18 and 20.1% who were 65 years of age or older. The median age was 43.4 years. For every 100 females, there were 87.6 males. For every 100 females age 18 and over, there were 85.8 males.

The median income for a household in the town was $103,082, and the median income for a family was $115,686.The per capita income for the town was $46,307. About 1.7% of families and 2.6% of the population were below the poverty line, including 3.6% of those under age 18 and 2.8% of those over age 65.

The racial makeup of the town was 92.0% White, 4.1% Asian, 2.9% Black or African American, 0.5% from other races, and 0.5% from two or more races. Hispanic or Latino of any race were 3.7% of the population. The ten largest ethnicities were Italian 11,025 (29.7%), Irish 9,166 (24.7%), German 4,363 (11.7%), English 3,112 (8.4%), Polish 2,762 (7.4%), Russian 1,558 (4.2%), Hungarian 1,447 (3.9%), French (except Basque) 1,087 (2.9%), Portuguese 885 (2.4%), & Slovak 881 (2.4%).

== Places of worship ==
- Christ Church and Tashua Burial Ground
- St. Catherine of Siena Church (Trumbull, Connecticut)
- St. Theresa Church (Trumbull, Connecticut)
- Armenian Church of the Holy Ascension

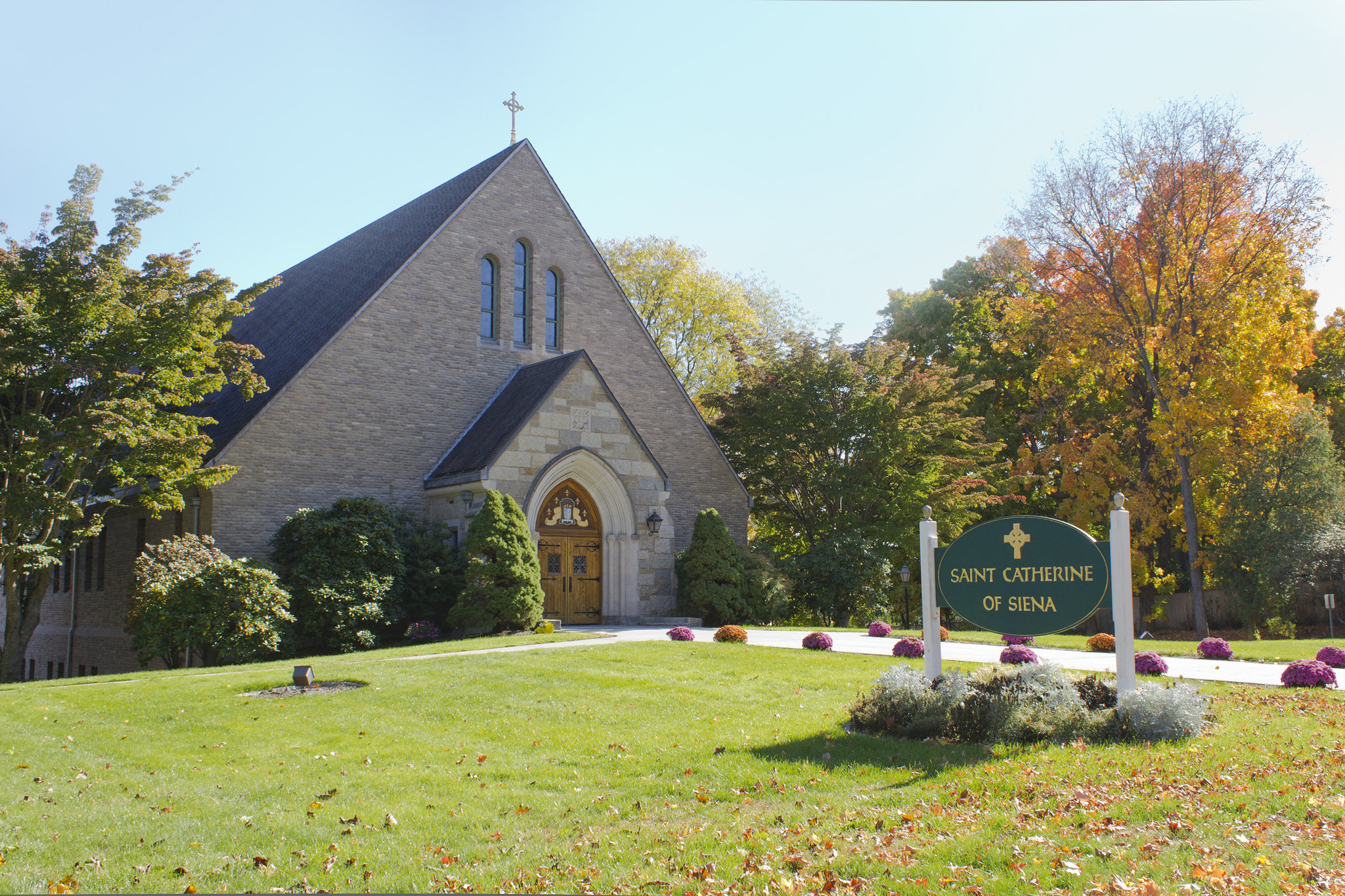
St. Catherine of Siena, Trumbull CT

== Notable locations ==
Bicentennial Fountain.

Trumbull's time capsule.

=== Bicentennial fountain and time capsule ===
The town's Bicentennial fountain is located at the corner of Quality Street and Church Hill Road (Connecticut Route 127), near the main branch of the library and the town hall. It features the Trumbull town seal and a memorial plaque of donors. In 1997 a time capsule was laid at the base of the Bicentennial Fountain with an opening date of October 12, 2097, Trumbull's tricentennial.

=== On the National Register of Historic Places ===
- Christ Episcopal Church and Tashua Burial Ground – 5170 Madison Avenue (added May 25, 2001)
- David Mallett Jr. House – 420 Tashua Road (added March 20, 1986)
- Nichols Farms Historic District – Center Road, 1681–1944 Huntington Turnpike, 5–34 Priscilla Place, and 30–172 Shelton Road (added September 20, 1987)
- Old Mine Park Archeological Site (added 1990)

== Economics ==
The revised town budget for 2009–2010 is $140,054,187.23. For 2009, Trumbull maintained a AA bond rating on $26.3 million in new general obligation issues. The total of Trumbull GOs is $98.1 million. Trumbull has approximately 1400 businesses.

=== Commerce ===
==== Corporate and industrial parks ====
Located north of the Merritt Parkway and east of Route 8 near the town boundary with Shelton and Stratford, 93,000 square feet (8,600 m^{2}) of commercial space is zoned and includes offices for large firms such as Helicopter Support, Sun Products, Unilever, and UnitedHealthcare. It is also home to the Market Integrity office of the NASDAQ OMX Group.

==== Retail ====
The Westfield Trumbull Mall is located on Route 111, or Main Street, on the town boundary with Bridgeport, has over 180 stores. The Hawley Lane Mall is located on Hawley Lane south of Route 8 on the town boundary with Stratford.

=== Economic development ===
==== Planning and Zoning Regulations ====
Professional Office Overlay Zones (formerly Design Districts) have been established on certain areas along White Plains Road (Route 127), Church Hill Road and Main Street (Route 111). A combination Business Commercial Multi-Family Residential Zone, or Mixed-use, has been created around the historic Long Hill Green (dating to 1720), to encourage new commercial development.

Adaptive reuse has been adopted to permit the reuse of all antique structures situated on state numbered roads which have been previously occupied by a non-conforming use, or are deemed historic by the town, and for which uses allowed by the existing zones are no longer viable—resulting in structures that may become badly maintained, under-utilized, vacant or demolished by neglect.

==== Blight Ordinance ====
The town amended its Municipal Code effective on October 1, 2012, to establish a Blight Prevention Ordinance pursuant to Section 7-148(c) (7) (H) (xv) of the Municipal Powers Act of the State of Connecticut General Statutes. This new ordinance encourages the rehabilitation of blighted premises by prohibiting any owner(s), or occupant(s) of real property from; allowing, creating, maintaining or causing the creation or maintenance of a blighted premises.

=== Taxes ===
The town's grand list assesses the taxable value in Trumbull at $5.114 billion, with a 2017 mill rate of 33.39. The cumulative value of Trumbull real estate is $4.615 billion.

== Infrastructure ==
=== Transportation ===
==== Roads ====
- Route 8 runs through the southeast part of town. Route 8 is a freeway that leads to Waterbury and Interstate 84, continues into Massachusetts as Massachusetts Route 8 and finally terminates in Searsburg, Vermont. Nichols residents petitioned the legislature and won a bypass for Route 8 which was initially proposed to be built directly through the center of the historic village in the early 1900s.
- Route 15, the historic Merritt Parkway, runs north (east) to New Haven (eventually connecting to Interstate 91) and south (west) towards New York City. Route 15 was built through Nichols center displacing a home, the old Nichols Store and Trinity Episcopal Church in 1939.
- Route 25 runs north to south, merging with Route 8 at the Bridgeport line and continues overlapped with Route 8 (commonly known as the Route 8/25 connector) into Bridgeport ending at Interstate 95. Continuing north on Route 25, the freeway ends as it crosses Route 111 and continues as a surface road towards I-84 in Newtown leading to Danbury.
- Route 108, also known as Nichols Avenue and Huntington Turnpike, heads north into Trumbull from Stratford at Hawley Lane. The Nichols Avenue portion in Trumbull was completed and its dimensions and abutting landowners were entered into the land records on December 7, 1696, making it the third oldest documented highway in Connecticut. It terminates in Shelton at the intersection with Route 110 (Howe Avenue). Route 108 can be reached via exits 33 and 34 from Route 15 north and south or exit 5 from Route 8.
- Route 111, also known as Main Street, begins at the intersection of Route 15 (exit 30) at the North End of Bridgeport. In 1801, the road connecting Bridgeport to Newtown was called the Bridgeport and Newtown Turnpike. From 1826 to 1852, the road from Trumbull to Stevenson was chartered as a turnpike and called the Monroe and Zoar Bridge Turnpike. Route 111 terminates at Route 34 in Monroe. Prior to the last section of the Route 25 highway opening in 1982, the portion of the current Route 111 from Route 15 to the intersection with the northern terminus of the divided-highway section of Route 25 was known as Route 25 instead of Route 111, with Route 111 starting at the Route 25 intersection.
- Route 127, also known as White Plains Road and Church Hill Road, runs through the town center from south to north from the East Side of Bridgeport. The section in Trumbull was laid out to Pulpit Rock in 1705. Route 127 ends at the intersection of Main Street (Route 111) at the Town Hall.

==== Bus ====
The Greater Bridgeport Transit Authority provides bus service for Trumbull.

==== Train ====
Three train stations are located near Trumbull:

- Bridgeport, 4.6 miles away.
- Stratford, 4.9 miles away.
- Fairfield–Black Rock, 5.7 miles away.

All three stations are served by Metro-North's New Haven Line. Bridgeport's station is served by Amtrak's Northeast Corridor and the Vermonter. All are easily accessible by bus routes or driving. The New Haven Railroad used to serve the town.

== Education ==
=== Public education ===
Public schools are managed by the Trumbull Public Schools System and as of 2022–2023 include 6,868 students and 512 teachers (on an FTE basis).

The system includes Trumbull High School, which is also home to an Agriscience & Biotechnology program, the Alternative High School, and REACH. Trumbull has two middle schools: Hillcrest Middle School and Madison Middle School. The six elementary schools in town include Booth Hill Elementary, Daniels Farm Elementary, Frenchtown Elementary, Jane Ryan Elementary School, Middlebrook Elementary, and Tashua Elementary. The Trumbull Early Childhood Education Center serves as the town's pre-school.

=== Private education ===
Trumbull has several private schools, including the (non-denominational) Christian Heritage School (K–12) and (Catholic) St. Catherine of Siena School (K–8), St. Joseph High School, and St. Theresa School (K–8). A private pre-school, the Montessori Center for Early Learning, is located in Trumbull.

=== Continuing education ===
Trumbull provides adult education in a variety of subjects at Trumbull High School, typically in the early evening.

== Emergency services ==
=== Emergency medical services ===
Trumbull EMS is a combined volunteer/paid organization founded in 1976. Trumbull EMS headquarters is at 250 Middlebrooks Avenue. Today, the organization is a town operated entity, operating as a "third service" with paid staff being town employees. Trumbull EMS is part of the Sponsor Council Hospitals of Greater Bridgeport region. Their fleet of vehicles includes three Chevrolet Type III ambulances (900, 901, and 902), two Sprinter Type II ambulances (one Mercedes Benz and one Ford) (903 and 904), two Chevy Tahoe paramedic fly-cars, one Ford Interceptor Deputy Chief vehicle, and one Chevy Tahoe Chief's vehicle. Trumbull EMs is regularly involved in community outreach and public events providing standby service at large event and education to local school.

=== Fire departments ===
Firefighting in the town of Trumbull is served by three independent and all-volunteer fire departments. Each fire department handles its own tax structure and fundraising but receives no funding from the town. There are a total of seven fire stations located throughout the town.

- Long Hill Fire District (since 1921)
- Nichols Fire District (since 1917)
- Trumbull Center Fire District (since 1925)

==== Fire station locations and apparatus ====
Fire Station	Engine	Ladder	Rescue	Special Unit	Address	Neighborhood
Trumbull Center Fire Station # 1	Engine 101	Tower Ladder 104	Rescue 100	Service Truck 107, Gator 1	860 White Plains Road	White Plains
Trumbull Center Fire Station # 2	Engine 102			Attack 105 (Mini-Pumper)	980 Daniels Farm Road	Daniels Farm
Long Hill Fire Station # 1	Engine 206		Rescue 200	Service Truck 203, Polaris ATV	6315 Main Street	Long Hill
Long Hill Fire Station # 2	Engine 205	Tower Ladder 204			5404 Main Street	Town Center
Long Hill Fire Station # 3	Squad 209			Engine 202 (Mini-Pumper), Service Truck 208	4229 Madison Avenue	Madison
Nichols Fire Station # 1	Engine 301, Engine 302, Engine 305		Rescue 300		100 Shelton Road	Nichols
Nichols Fire Station # 2	Squad 309	Truck 304		Service Truck 307	548 Booth Hill Road	Booth Hill

=== Police department ===
The Trumbull Police Department was created in 1941 through an act of the State Legislature. It is under the jurisdiction of a six-member Board of Police Commissioners appointed by the First Selectman. The department currently has eighty officers and ten civilian workers, including the dog warden. The current Chief of Police is Micahel Lombardo. The police department is located at 158 Edison Road.

== Government and politics ==
Trumbull town vote by party in presidential elections
Year	Democratic	Republican	Third Parties
2024	51.6% 11,294	46.6% 10,202	1.8% 403
2020	55.7% 11,919	42.9% 9,175	1.5% 76
2016	46.9% 9,299	49.1% 9,753	4.0% 794
2012	46.1% 8,703	52.9% 9,986	1.0% 180
2008	49.2% 9,757	50.0% 9,927	0.8% 158
2004	44.0% 8,656	54.9% 10,789	1.1% 221
2000	46.8% 8,659	49.4% 9,142	3.8% 694
1996	42.2% 7,338	46.0% 8,001	11.8% 2,047
1992	31.8% 6,353	47.5% 9,486	20.7% 4,135
1988	34.1% 6,179	64.9% 11,769	1.1% 192
1984	26.6% 4,920	73.1% 13,512	0.3% 60
1980	27.9% 4,880	61.7% 10,782	10.4% 1,816
1976	37.4% 6,194	62.0% 10,277	0.7% 115
1972	28.1% 4,437	69.9% 11,028	2.0% 317
1968	34.1% 4,642	58.2% 7,923	7.8% 1,059
1964	50.5% 5,780	49.5% 5,673	0
1960	41.5% 4,435	58.5% 6,261	0
1956	21.1% 1,677	78.9% 6,286	0

Historically, Trumbull was a reliably Republican stronghold in presidential elections. However, the town has seen a few swings in favor of the Democrats in recent years. In 2008, John McCain only carried the town by 0.9% In 2016, Hillary Clinton only lost by 2.8%. In 2020, Democrat Joe Biden won it by 12.8%.

Voter registration and party enrollment as of October 26, 2021
Party	Active voters	Inactive voters	Total voters	Percentage
Democratic	7,780	490	8,270	29.1%
Republican	6,403	407	6,810	24.0%
Unaffiliated	12,235	766	13,001	45.8%
Minor parties	316	23	339	1.2%
Total	26,734	1,686	28,420	100%

== Notable sport teams ==
The National Little League of Trumbull defeated the Kang-Tu Little League of Kaohsiung, Taiwan, in the championship game of the 1989 Little League World Series.

== Activities and organizations ==
- The Nichols Improvement Association was founded in 1889 and has 47 acres (0.19 km^{2}) of open space. Its gazebo is used for wedding pictures, social gatherings and for the sale of Christmas trees.
- Tashua Recreation Facility, at 268 acres (1.08 km^{2}) in size, includes basketball, tennis courts, swimming pool, playground, picnic area, multi-purpose field and Tashua Knolls, an 18-hole golf course built in 1976 and designed by noted golf architect Al Zikorus. The course features a driving range, two putting greens, pro shop, locker rooms, restaurant and banquet facility. There is also Tashua Glen, a 9-hole "Executive style" course opened in 2004. Both courses feature cart paths. There is a Men's Club, Senior Men's Club, Ladies 9-holer, and Ladies 18-holer organizations active at the course.
- The Trumbull Community Women is a group dedicated to promoting civic service. It is open to all women over 18, and runs a Young Women's Club as well. They meet at the Trumbull Library Community Room, generally on the first Tuesday of the month September through June.
- The Town Hall Gazebo is host to concerts, mainly on Tuesday nights during the Summer.
- The Trumbull Historical Society, founded in 1964, maintains a museum of Trumbull's past at 1856 Huntington Turnpike on the site of Abraham Nichols farm.
- The Trumbull Nature & Arts Center is located at 7115 Main Street and coordinate trips for fishing, butterfly searches, gardening, outdoor photography and other nature related activities.
- The Trumbull Teen Center was located at the barn at Indian Ledge Park and featured activities such as air hockey, Foosball, local band concerts, ping pong and basketball for Trumbull residents. The barn has not served as a teen center for several years, but there are efforts underway to reopen it.
- Trumbull's Senior Center is located at 23 Priscilla Place. The senior transportation department continues to provide effective door-to-door services to seniors age 60 and over without transportation or unable to drive. Services include doctor' s appointments, shopping, nutrition program, dentist appointments and legal appointments. It provides a variety of resources such as Continuing Education and Social Services as well as activities.
- The Society Farsharotu, an Aromanian cultural organization, has its headquarters at Trumbull.

=== Library ===
The Trumbull Library System (TLS) is the town's main lending library with a staff of fifteen and two locations. The library features online book searches & renewal, statewide inter-library loan, adult & youth sections, and several meeting rooms. Internet terminals and photocopy machines are also available for use. Various groups utilize the library for meetings and workshops. The catalog of the library includes over 148,000 printed materials, 10,000 video materials, 4,500 audio materials and 200 subscriptions available as audio books on CD/tape/MP3, books, DVDs, graphic novels, magazines, music CDs, and VHS tapes. Annual circulation exceeds 373,000 transactions.

There are two branches of the library:

- The Trumbull Library (main branch) is adjacent to Town Hall at 33 Quality Street.
- The Fairchild-Nichols Memorial Library is located at 1718 Huntington Turnpike.

== Media ==
=== Local outlets ===
- Trumbull Community Television is available via Charter Cable on channel 17 and via Frontier Communications on channel 99. The Educational-access television cable TV station's programming features coverage of school events and programs, Government-access television (GATV) provides coverage of all town government commissions, boards and legislative meetings. It also provides emergency announcements, community information and announcements regarding town services.
- Public-access television is available via Charter Cable Community Vision 192.
- The Trumbull Times is the local community newspaper, published weekly on Thursdays.

=== Filming location ===
- Isn't it Delicious?, Independent film (2011)
- A Dance for Grace (2010)
- Revolutionary Road (2008)
- Oprah Winfrey presents For One More Day which aired on ABC in December 2007

=== Accolades ===
Family Circle magazine has ranked Trumbull 7th in their "10 Best Towns for Families" 2011. U.S. News & World Report magazine has ranked Trumbull one of the best 15 places to retire in Connecticut. RelocateAmerica.com ranked Trumbull in their annual list of America's "Top 100 Places to Live". Money magazine ranked Trumbull #68 in their 100 best places to live rankings of U.S. cities in 2007 and #77 in 2009.

== Notable people ==
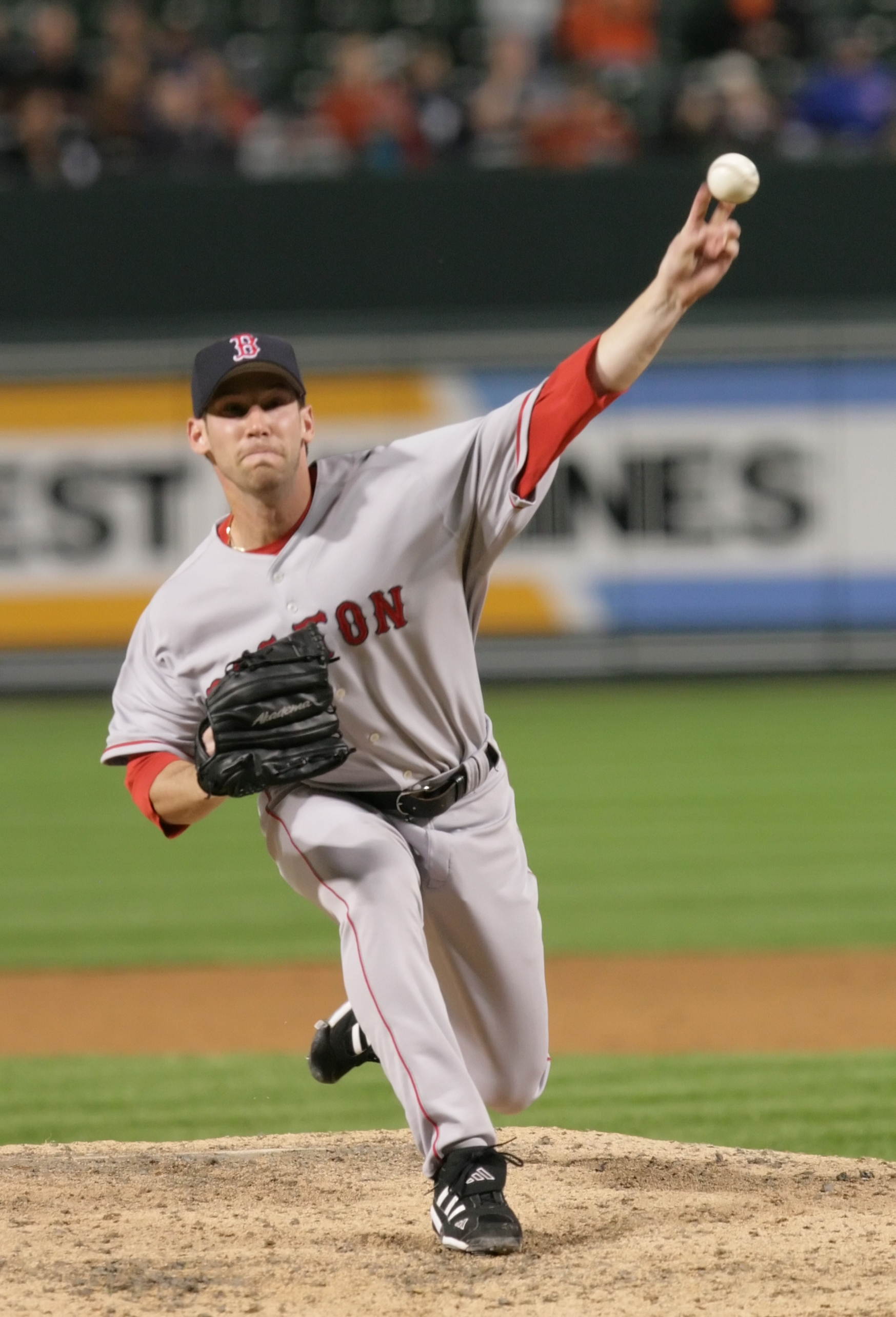
Craig Breslow

- Lee Abbamonte, travel blogger and the youngest American to visit all 193 United Nations member states
- Dick Allen (1939–2017), American poet and poet laureate of the state of Connecticut
- John W. Beach (born 1825), seventh President of Wesleyan University
- James Beebe (1717–1785), Reverend at Unity Parish, Army Preacher in the French and Indian War and patriot
- Truman Bradley (1826–1900), American Indian from the Schaghticoke tribe
- Craig Breslow (born 1980), professional baseball player (pitcher) Oakland Athletics and Boston Red Sox, and Red Sox executive, 1998 Trumbull High School graduate
- P. W. Catanese, author of the Books of Umber and Further Tales Adventures series
- Joseph DiMenna, hedge-fund manager and patron of the arts
- Nancy DiNardo, Chairwoman of the Democratic Party of Connecticut
- Chris Drury, professional hockey player, won the Stanley Cup, 2-time Olympic silver medalist and member of the 1989 Little League World Series championship team from Trumbull
- Ted Drury, former NHL player
- Alison Espach (born 1984), author
- Felly, rapper
- Will Geer (1902–1978), actor and folklorist, maintained "Geer-Gore Gardens"

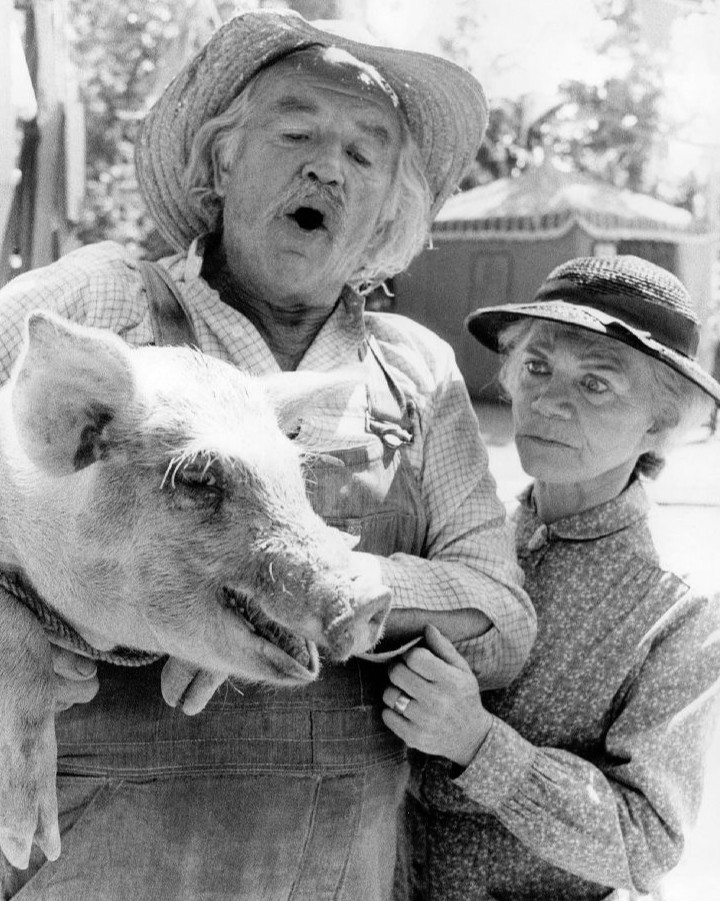
Will Geer

- Nero Hawley (1742–1817), slave, served in the Continental Army earning his freedom

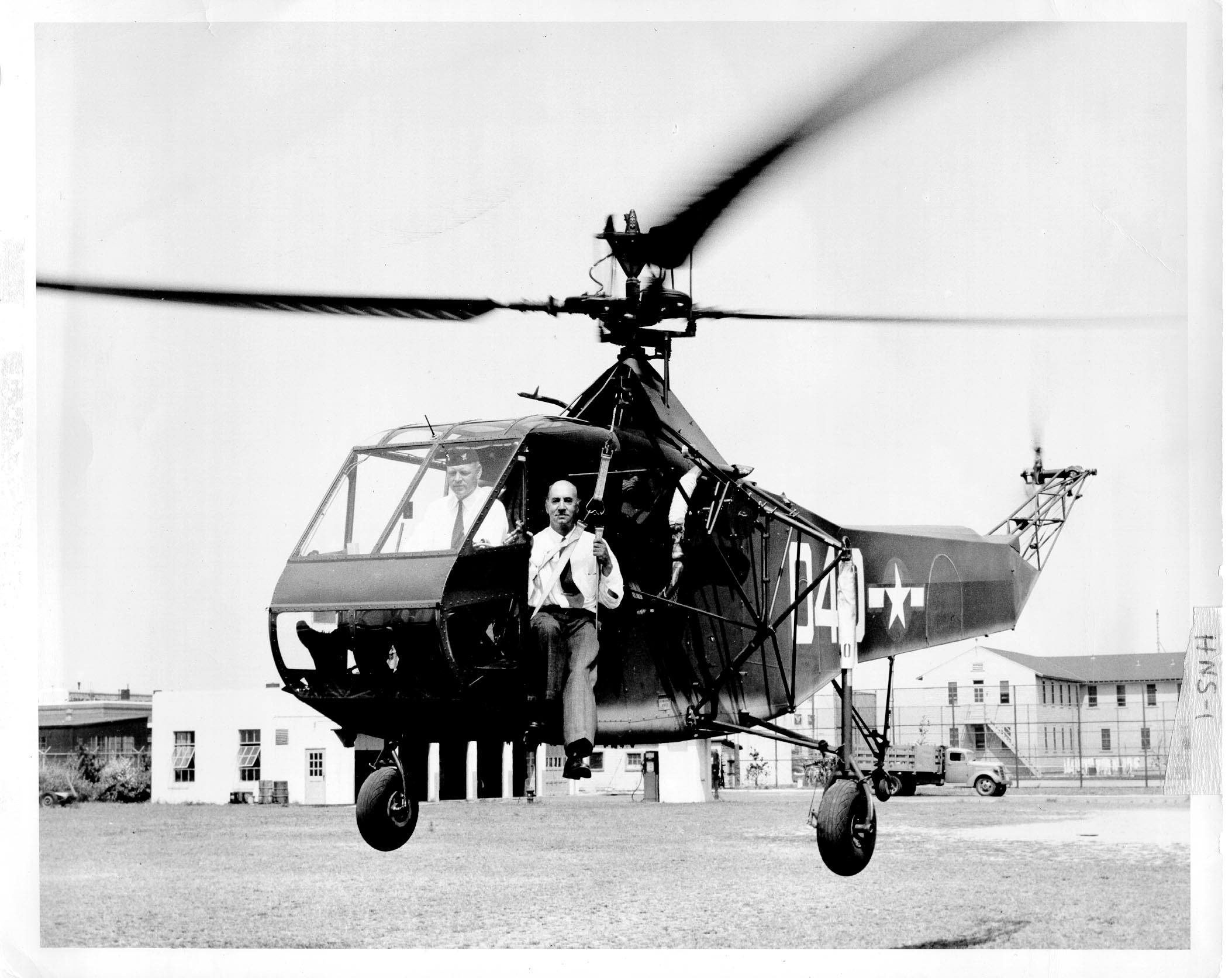
Igor Sikorsky

- Robert Hawley (1729–1799), Captain North Stratford Train Band in the American Revolutionary War
- Carolyn Hax (born 1966), writer and columnist for The Washington Post and the author of the advice column "Tell Me About It"
- Tony Horton, actor, personal trainer and creator of p90x home fitness program
- Harvey Hubbell (1857–1927), inventor
- Joseph Judson (1619–1690), early settler, militia officer and local official. Negotiated the purchase of Long Hill area from the Paugussett Indians
- Burt Kearns, television and motion picture writer and producer, journalist and Tabloid Baby author
- Lisa Lampanelli, comedian, actress and writer
- January LaVoy, Broadway and television actress
- Mark Longwell, professional soccer player and United States men's national soccer team member
- Brian E. Luther, U.S. Navy Rear Admiral
- Manya Makoski, professional soccer player (Los Angeles Sol)
- Charlie Morton, two-time MLB All-Star pitcher for the Tampa Bay Rays, who was the winning pitcher in Game 7 of the 2017 World Series with the Houston Astros
- Alyssa Naeher, United States women's national soccer team goalkeeper in the 2019 FIFA Women's World Cup
- Igor Sikorsky (1889–1972), aviation pioneer and helicopter inventor
- Benjamin Silliman (1779–1864), first professor of science at Yale and first to distill petroleum
- Chris Soule, Olympic skeleton (sport) athlete
- Jim Tennant, former MLB player
- Diya Vij, Commissioner of the New York City Department of Cultural Affairs

== Sister city ==
Xinyi, Jiangsu (China), since 2008. A plaque in Twin Brooks Park commemorates this friendship.

== See also ==
- Ephraim Hawley House
- Golden Hill Paugussett Indian Nation
- Gregory's Four Corners Burial Ground
- Little League World Series Trumbull 1989 World Champions
- Nichols Farms Historic District
- Unity Burial Ground
