= Zachariah Curtiss House =

Coordinates: 41.2348°N 73.1594°W

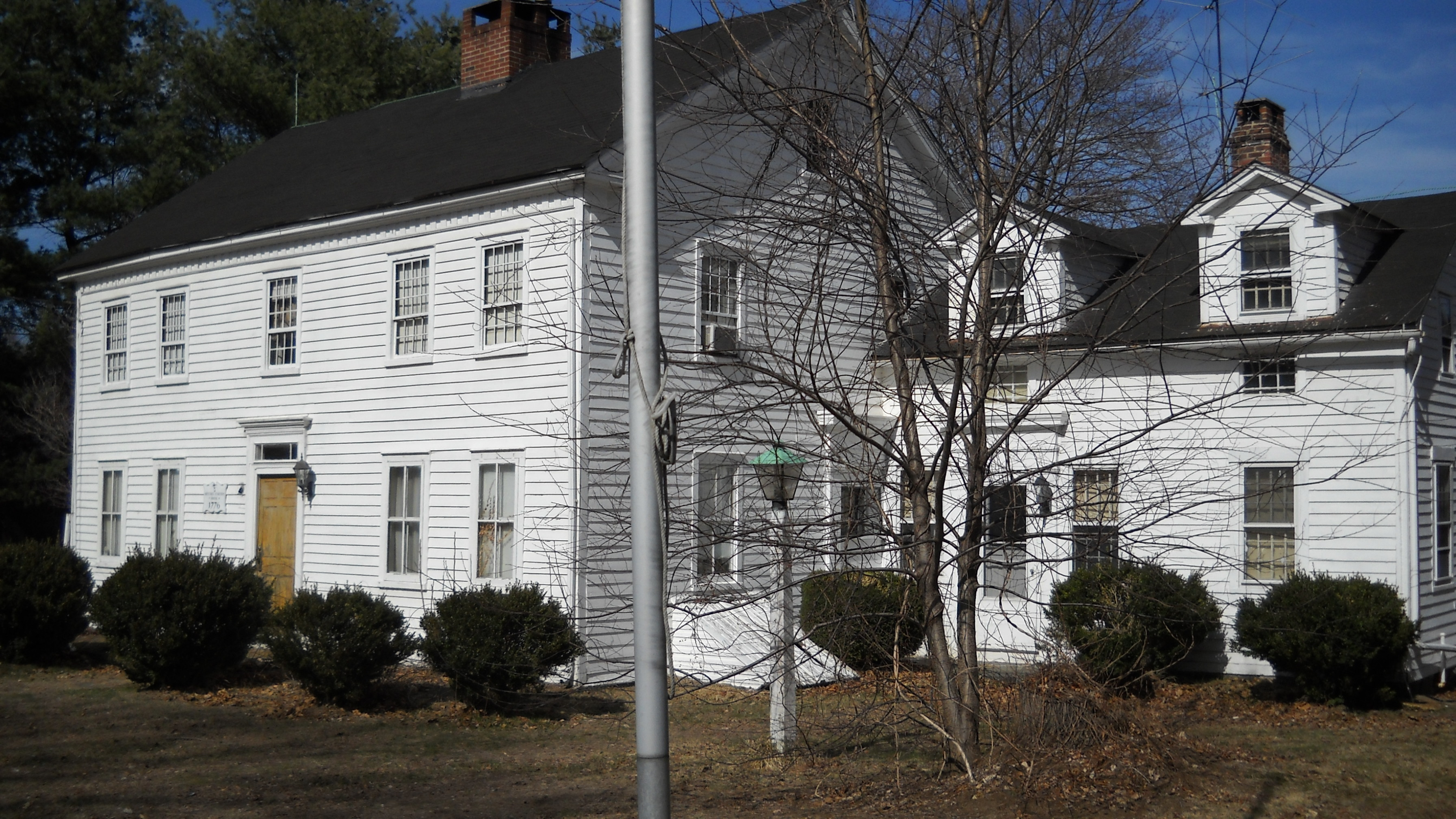
- Interactive map of the Zachariah Curtiss House area

General information
- Type: post-and-beam
- Architectural style: Colonial
- Location: Trumbull, Connecticut
- Construction started: 1721
- Completed: 1800
- Governing body: Private

Dimensions
- Other dimensions: 35' by 26'

The Zachariah Curtiss House is located at 2950 Nichols Avenue on the east side of the Farm Highway or Route 108 on the south side of Mischa Hill, in the village of Nichols in Trumbull, Connecticut in New England. The house was built by Zachariah II between 1721 and 1746 in the Georgian architectural style. The Colonial American wooden post-and-beam timber frame farm house has a one and one-half story ell added in 1800. The house has the distinction of being located in four different townships in its history, but has never been moved; Stratford (1686–1725), Unity (1725–1744), North Stratford (1744–1797) and Trumbull (1797-present). It is currently in a dilapidated state awaiting demolition.

== Zachariah Curtiss ==
Zachariah Curtiss, the son of William, was born in Stratford on November 14, 1659. Zachariah received division land as a part of the three mile or wood's division on November 17, 1693, that was described as lying in ye woods as you go to Captain's Farm.

== Farm Highway ==
On December 7, 1696 the Farm Highway, present-day Nichols Avenue Connecticut Route 108, was laid out by the Stratford selectmen to the south side of Mischa Hill. The highway was 12 rods wide, or 198 feet, where Broadbridge Brook runs off the south side of Mischa Hill, at Zachariah Curtiss, his land, and at Captain's Farm. Broadbridge Brook runs off Mischa Hill west of the present-day intersection of Route 108 and the Merritt Parkway and flows southwesterly to Broadbridge Avenue in Stratford.

The Captain the town recorder was referring to may have been Captain William Curtiss who was Captain of the first Train Band and owned a farm at Turkey Hill at this time. This hill was located two miles from the meeting house along the Farm Highway on the way north to Mischa Hill. The hill was also commonly called Second Hill, Good Hill and Grassy Hill.

The Captain could have also been Joseph, Joseph Jr. or John Hawley who owned the farm, called Ephraim Hawley House, which bordered Zachariah Curtiss to the south. John Hawley was Captain of the Second or North Train Band and was Justice of the Peace for Fairfield County. In October 1725, when the Assembly of the Connecticut Colony approved the Parish of Unity, they referred to the Farm Highway as Nickol's Farm's Road. The Nichols Avenue portion of Route 108 in Trumbull is considered to be the third-oldest documented highway in Connecticut after the Mohegan Road, Connecticut Route 32 in Norwich (1670) and the King's Highway, or Boston Post Road Route 1 (1673).

== Zachariah Curtiss II ==
On February 27, 1721, Zachariah I transferred his entire farm with 52 acres (0.21 km^{2}) of land to his son Zachariah II. The farm was described as containing two separate parcels. One parcel contained 20 acres (0.081 km^{2}) with a dwelling house and was on the west side of the Farm highway and was bounded west on Daniel Hawley (Ephraim Hawley's son), south on Joseph Curtiss, north on Fairchild land and east on the Farm highway. The other parcel was on the east side of the Farm highway and contained 32 acres (0.13 km^{2}) of land and a barn and was bounded west with the Farm highway and part west on Benjamin Beach, Ephraim and Joseph Curtiss, part south on Captain John Hawley (Ephraim Hawley's brother), east with Benjamin Beach and north on Joseph Curtiss,

== Mitchell Curtiss ==
In 1746, Zachariah II left his house, the old barn and whole homestead to his only son Mitchell when he died. Curtiss and his wife, who predeceased him, are buried in the Unity Burial Ground. The Fairfield Probate Court appraised the farm, which contained only 50 acres (0.20 km^{2}), at 1,050 pounds. Mitchell married Phoebe Peet, the daughter of Deacon Thomas Peet, in 1753 and subsequently gifted the Georgian house and fourteen acres to his son Zachariah III in 1776 when he married.

== The house today ==
Over the last 300 years, the appearance of the house has evolved to meet the needs of the families who lived there. Many original architectural details remain preserved including; dirt cellars, field stone foundations, oak post and beam frames, oak roof sheathing, pine flooring, original trim, windows and frames.

== Images ==
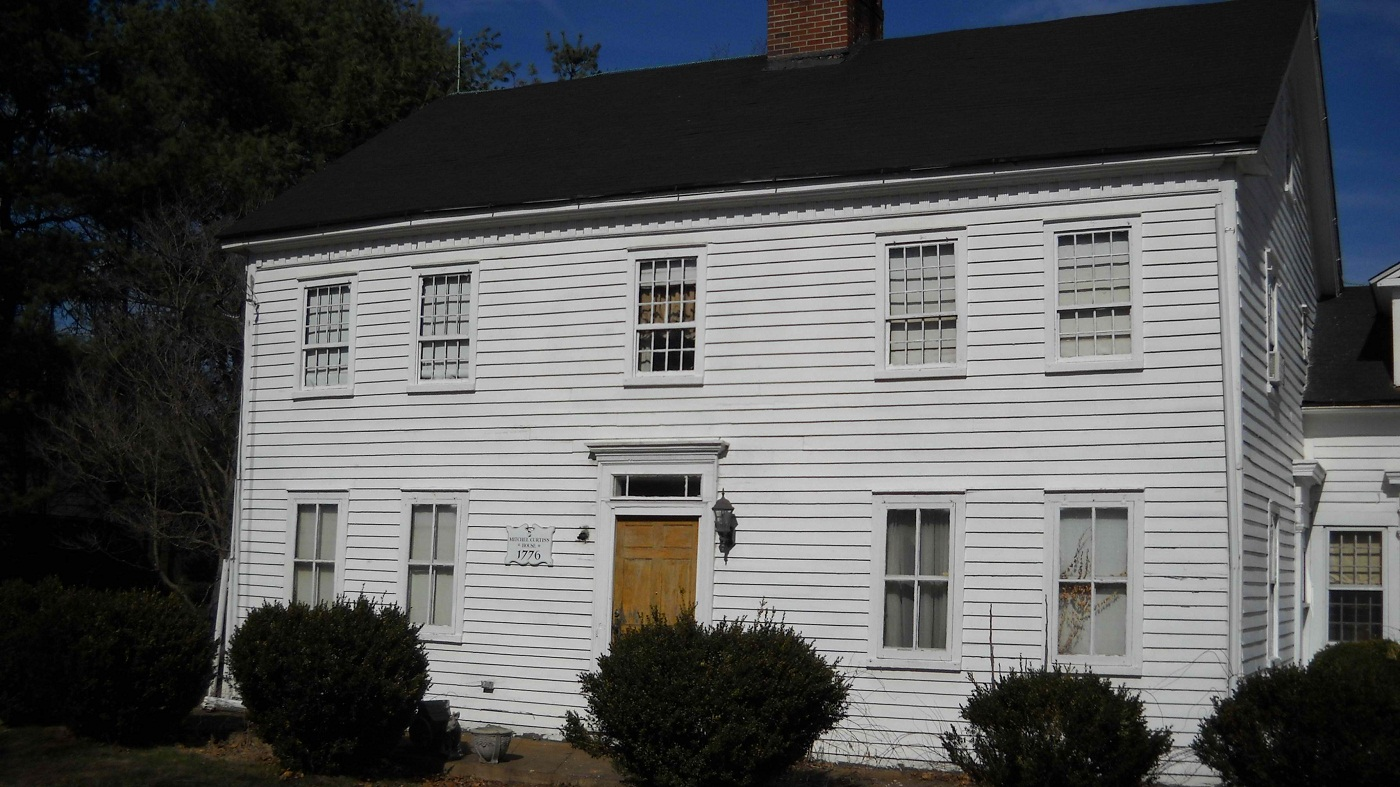
Zachariah Curtiss House facade

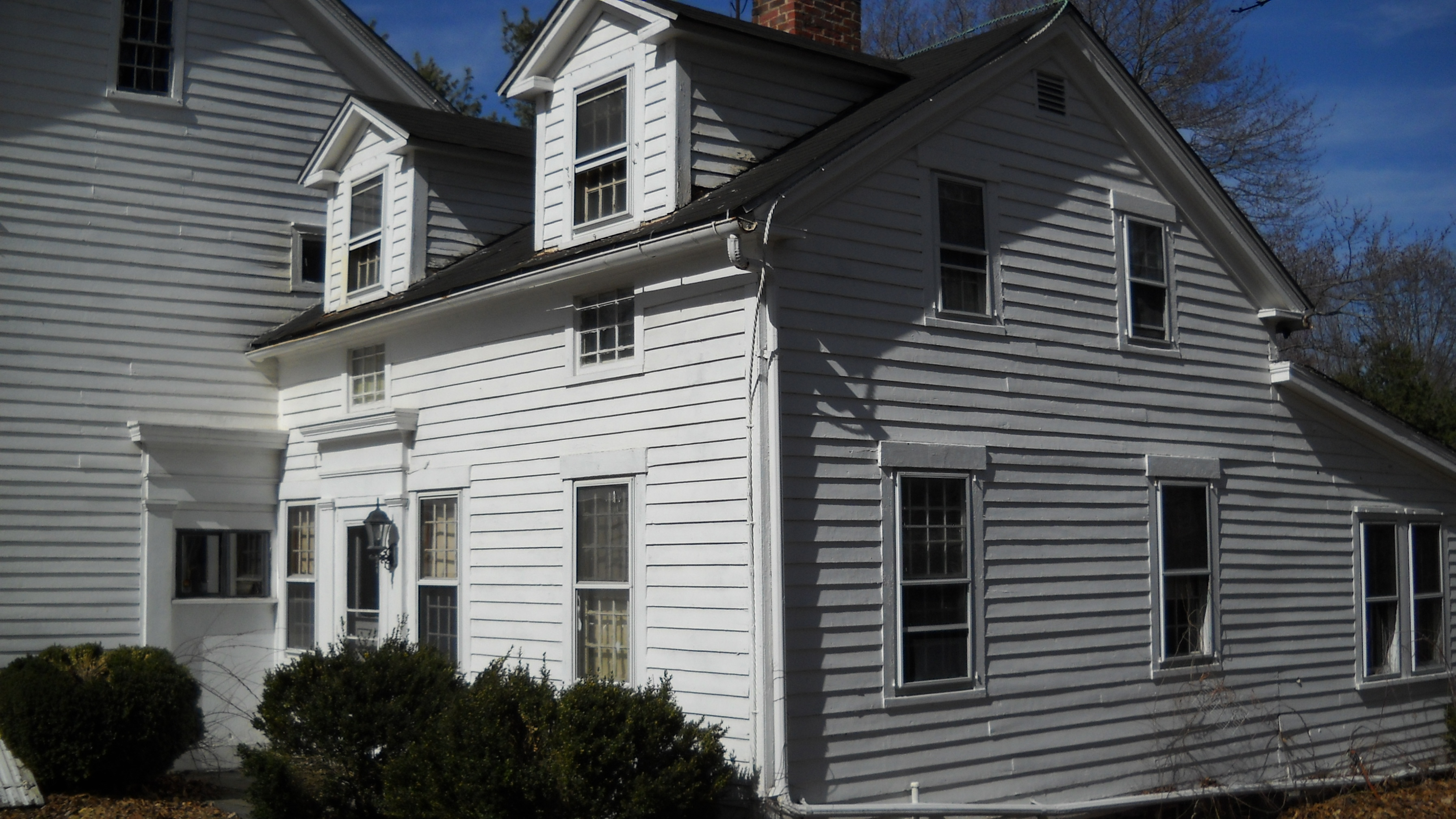
Zachariah Curtiss House 1800 ell

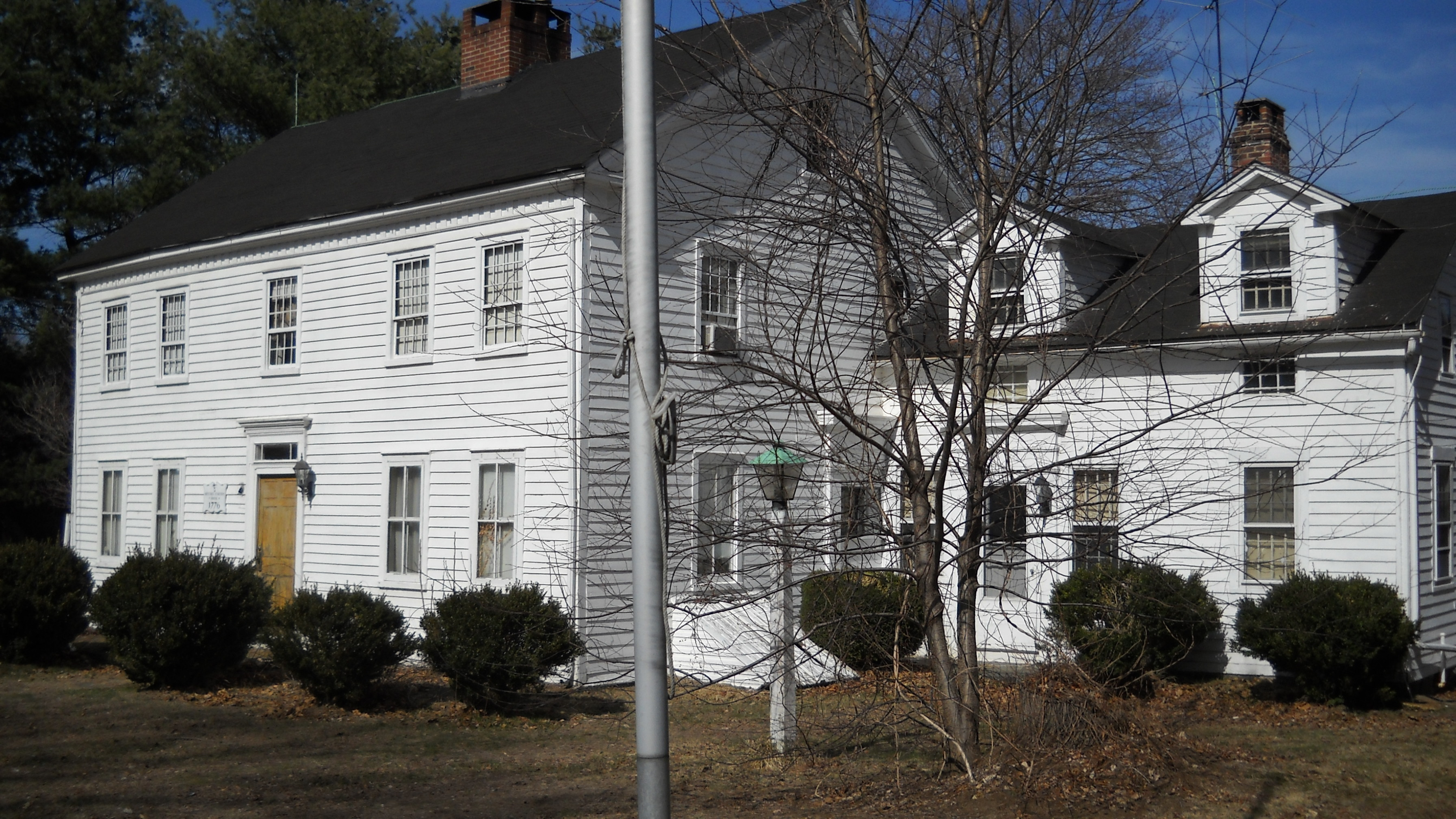
Zachariah Curtiss House present day

See also

- History of Trumbull, Connecticut
- Nichols Farms Historic District
- Stratford, Connecticut
- Trumbull, Connecticut
- Nichols, Connecticut
