= Nichols Farms Historic District =

Historic district in Connecticut, United States

- U.S. National Register of Historic Places
- U.S. Historic district
- Clark's Map of Nichol's Farms in 1867

- Location within Connecticut Location within the United States
- Location: Center Road, 1681--1944 Huntington Turnpike, 5--34 Priscilla Place, and 30--172 Shelton Road, Trumbull, Connecticut
- Coordinates: 41°14′33″N 73°9′53″W
- Area: 104 acres (42 ha)
- Architectural style: Early Colonial, Georgian, Federal, Greek Revival, Victorian
- NRHP reference No.: 87001392
- Added to NRHP: August 20, 1987

Nichols Farms is a historic area within the town of Trumbull, Connecticut. The Nichols Farms Historic District, which encompasses part of the area, is listed on the National Register of Historic Places.

Originally home to the Paugusset people, the Nichols area was colonized by the English during the Great Migration of the 1630s as a part of the coastal settlement of Stratford. The first English settlements followed soon after settlement of the mother-town in 1639.

The area was governed by Stratford for eighty six years before a separate village was organized in 1725. Hence, all of Nichols Farms early public records are intermingled with and identified as Stratford records.

The early English settlers named Nichols after the family who maintained a large farm in its center. It was first organized as the village of Unity in 1725. The village of Unity (later called North Stratford) continued for seventy-two years before the privileges of a town were granted in 1797.

== NRHP listing and buildings ==
The Nichols Farms Historic District was listed on the National Register of Historic Places on September 20, 1987, with reference number 87001392, and included 104 acres (0.42 km^{2}), 81 contributing buildings, one contributing site and one contributing object. The buildings listed on the registry are located close to the green with addresses of Center Road, 1681-1944 Huntington Turnpike, 5-34 Priscilla Place and 30-172 Shelton Road. The 81 buildings are mostly private residences situated on two main roads in a village setting. They represent all of the periods of Connecticut domestic architecture from the early 18th century to the present.

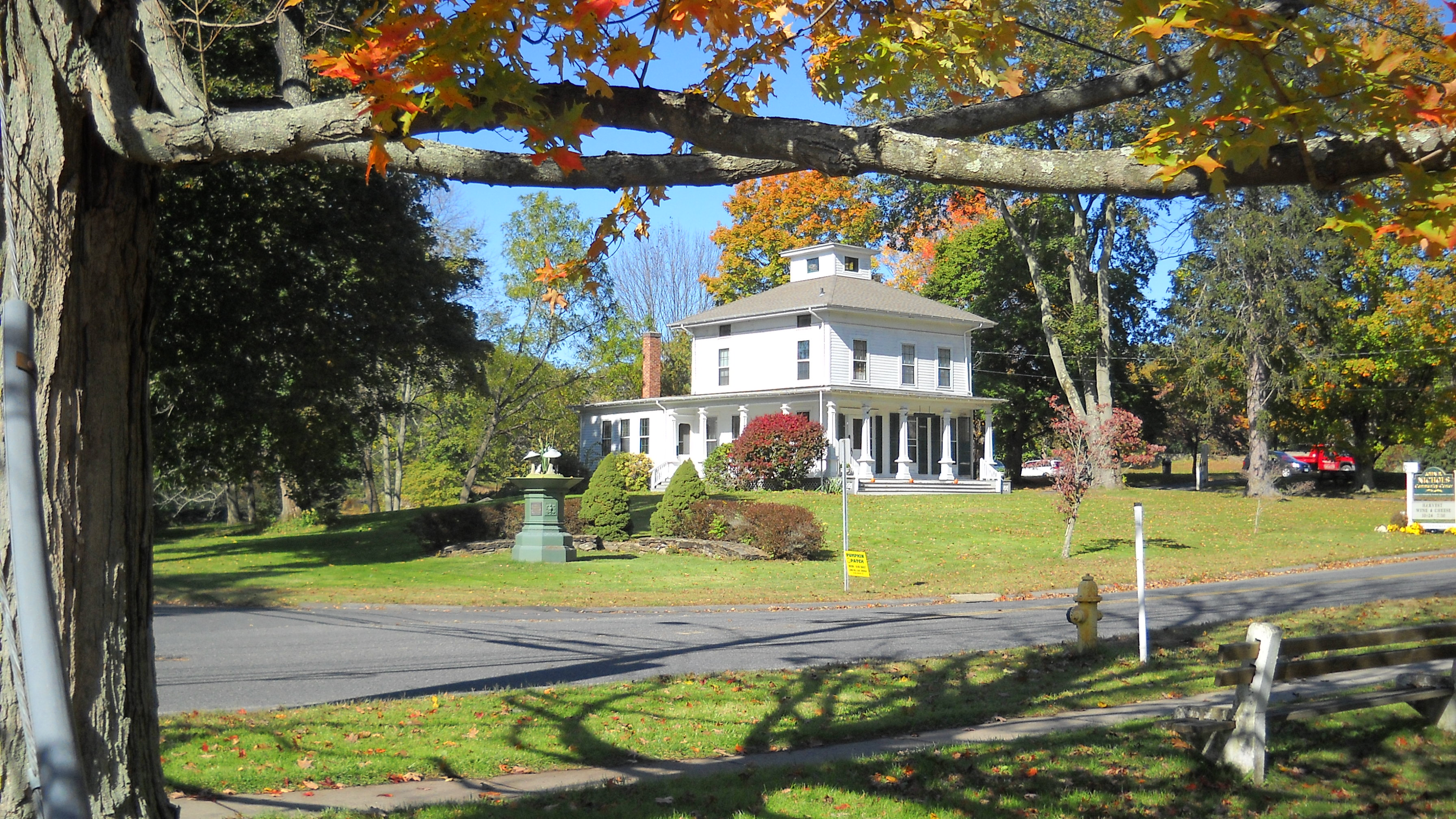
N.I.A. Starkweather House and Peet Fountain view from green

== Land use and development ==
In 1661, the Stratford selectmen voted to allow all inhabitants the liberty of taking up a whole division of land anywhere they could find fit planting ground as long as it was not within two miles (3 km) of the town meeting house, and they were prohibited from making it their dwelling place without consent. Elder Phillip Groves, Captain William Curtiss and Lt. Joseph Judson, early farmers in Nichols Farms, were named to a committee to lay out the land as they saw fit. The common land in Nichols Farms was divided to individuals beginning in 1670 as a part of the three-mile or woods division, and continued up to 1800.

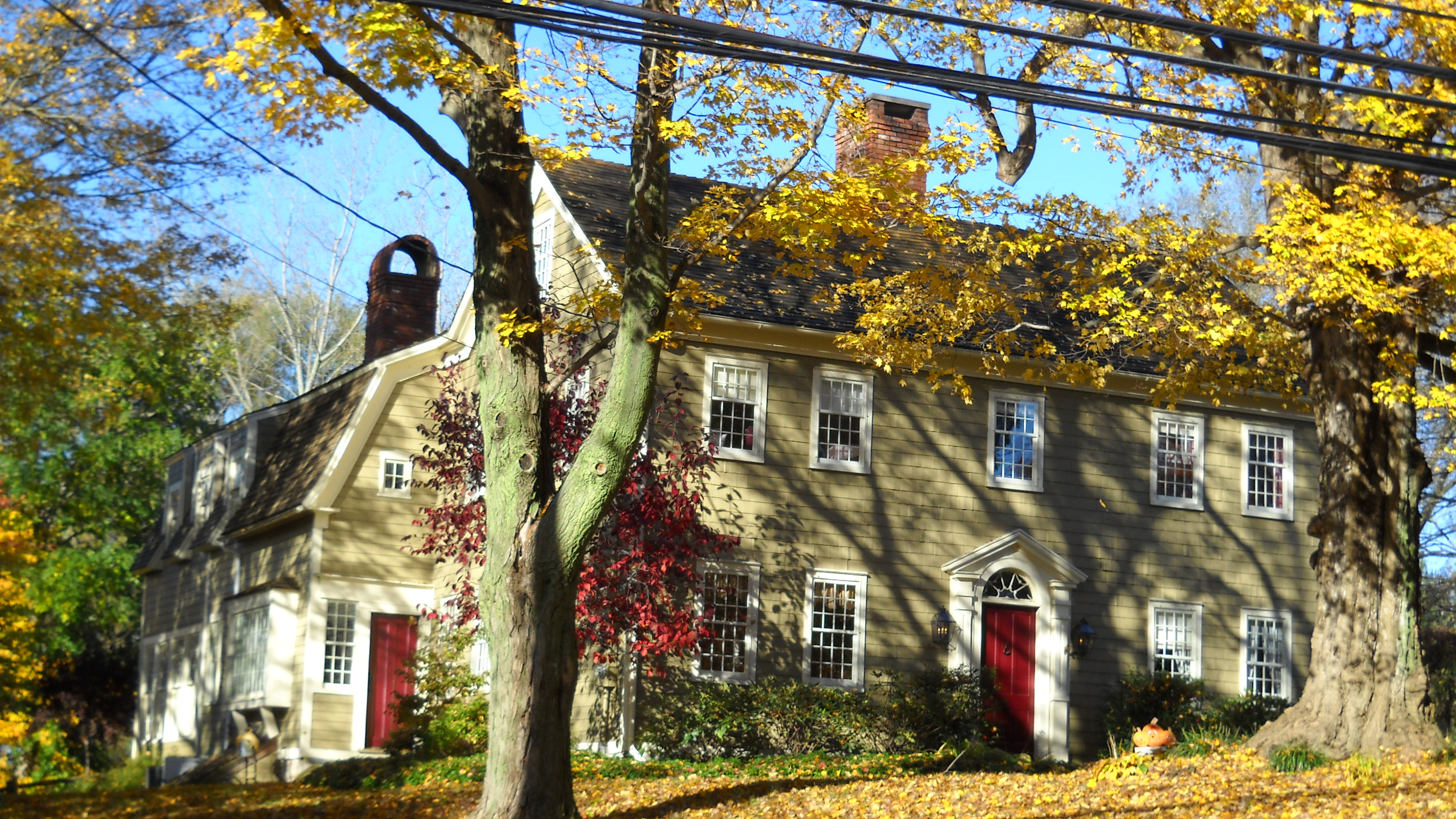
Joseph Plumb House ca. 1780

== Agriculture ==
Mischa Hill, located in the geographic center of Nichols Farms, was first called Lt. Joseph Judson's Farm or Old Farm in the land records. It was the first area within Trumbull to be farmed and settled by English colonists. The first landowners were among the first settlers to arrive at Stratford namely; Richard Booth, Zachariah Bostick, Lt. Paul Brinsmaid, John Curtiss, Benjamin Curtiss, Joseph Curtiss, Captain William Curtiss, Ebenezer Curtiss, Zachariah Curtiss, Joseph Fairchild, Elder Philip Groves, Mr. Joseph Hawley (Captain), Samuel Hawley, Ephraim Hawley, Lt. Joseph Judson, Jeremiah Judson, Isaac Judson, Caleb Nichols, Abraham Nichols, Samuel Uffoot and Reverend Zachariah Walker.

Lt. Joseph Judson, Sgt. Jeremiah Judson and Joseph Curtiss established their farms on Mischa Hill before 1658, the year in which they were elected as freemen by the legislature of the Connecticut Colony. To be elected as a freeman at the time, an individual had to own real property in his own name.

== Religious rift ==
In the 1660s, Lt. Joseph Judson disagreed with the majority in town, as he and others tried to introduce the half way covenant. In 1672, Judson obtained permission from then Governor John Winthrop, Jr. to remove with other families and settle the new town of Woodbury. He abandoned his farm in Nichols Farms. In 1688, others like Caleb Nichols removed to Woodbury and in the same year, John Curtiss gifted his farm on Mischa Hill to his son Benjamin and removed there as well. After Judson abandoned his farm, it became commonly called Old Farm.

== Abraham Nichols ==
Abraham Nichols was believed to have made the first permanent settlement within Trumbull around 1690 or 1700, depending on the source, and that others soon followed venturing into the wilderness to establish mills, churches, and schools. Abraham Nichols landholdings were said to total 1,000 acres (4.0 km^{2}), with much of it remaining in the Nichols family for more than two centuries. The last of the line was Florence Nichols, who married George Woods in 1903. Soon after their deaths in 1973 and 1972, respectively, the property was deeded to the Nichols Methodist Church.

The Town of Trumbull purchased it from the church in 1974. This tract was then known as the Woods Estate and is now the home of the Trumbull Historical Society. Recent research has determined that Nichols holdings totaled around 285 acres (1.15 km^{2}) of land, of which 55 acres (0.22 km^{2}) remains as open space today.

According to Walter Nicholls, who wrote the History of the Nichols Family in 1909, Abraham did not accompany his father to Woodbury in 1673, but remained in Trumbull to oversee the plantation. However, since Abraham (born 1662) was only eleven at the time, it is more likely that he did go with his parents and family to Woodbury. He returned to Trumbull between 1696 and 1700.

Walter Nicholls' description of the Nichols homestead follows:

About 1700 Abraham Nicholls erected for himself a homestead upon his lordly domain, and which, according to the description vouchsafed by persons now living, who chanced to view it while yet standing in the early part of the nineteenth century, was an immense gambrel-roofed structure of a rambling style of architecture, situated upon an eminence, affording an unobstructed vista of the surrounding landscape and at the southward, about four miles distant, the shimmering bosom of Long Island Sound. There it stood for decades, without a neighboring habitation within a circuit of several miles; while the sepulchral quietude of its surroundings was rarely broken, even by the echo of a sound adequate to dispel the day dreams, or waken the nocturnal slumbers of its peaceful inhabitants, save that of the casual lowing of kine, the appealing cadence of the whop-poor-will at nightfall, or the grewsome howling of wolves. ... It is a subject of profound regret on the part of many of the descendents of Abraham Nicholls that neither his will nor the inventory of his estate can be found of record.

According to Stratford land records, Abraham Nichols purchased several old farms and large parcels of land in 1696. Nichols exchanged his land for 22 acres (0.089 km^{2}) of Lt. Joseph Judsons old farm which had a barn on it, 54 acres (0.22 km^{2}) or half the land owned by Jeremiah Judson, and 19 acres (0.077 km^{2}) of land from Benjamin Curtiss. These transactions are described in the land records as being located at or near the Old farm, Judson's farm's or Lt. Joseph Judson farm. In 1699, Lt. Ebenezer Curtiss recorded 15 acres (0.061 km^{2}) of land from the three-mile division that was bounded west with Lt. Joseph Judson's farm, now belonging to Abraham Nichols. This deed confirms that Nichols purchased Judson's old farm, established in 1658, and was not the first to settle the area.

In 1704, Nichols purchased Reverend Zachariah Walker's entire farm, which was 36 acres (0.15 km^{2}) in size. In 1708, Nichols bought 5 acres (0.020 km^{2}) known as Mischa Hill Meadow from Joseph Fairchild, and in 1715 he added 1 acre (0.0040 km^{2}) from Captain John Hawley. These three large farms when combined with Nichols own division land and other parcels, totaled around 285 acres (1.15 km^{2}) of land. Some of the old farms, about 54 acres (0.22 km^{2}), remain as open space today.

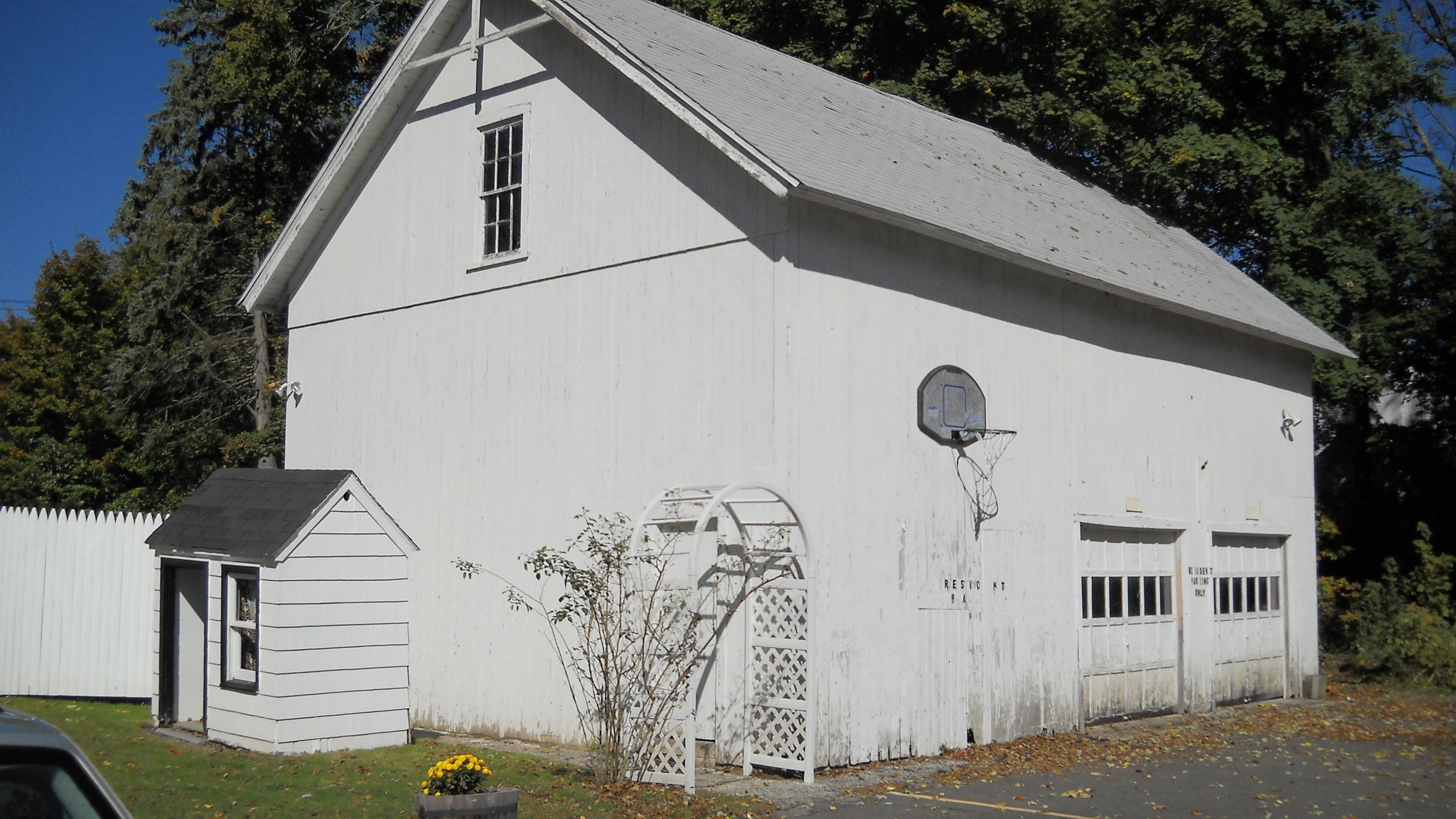
Peet barn ca. 1700

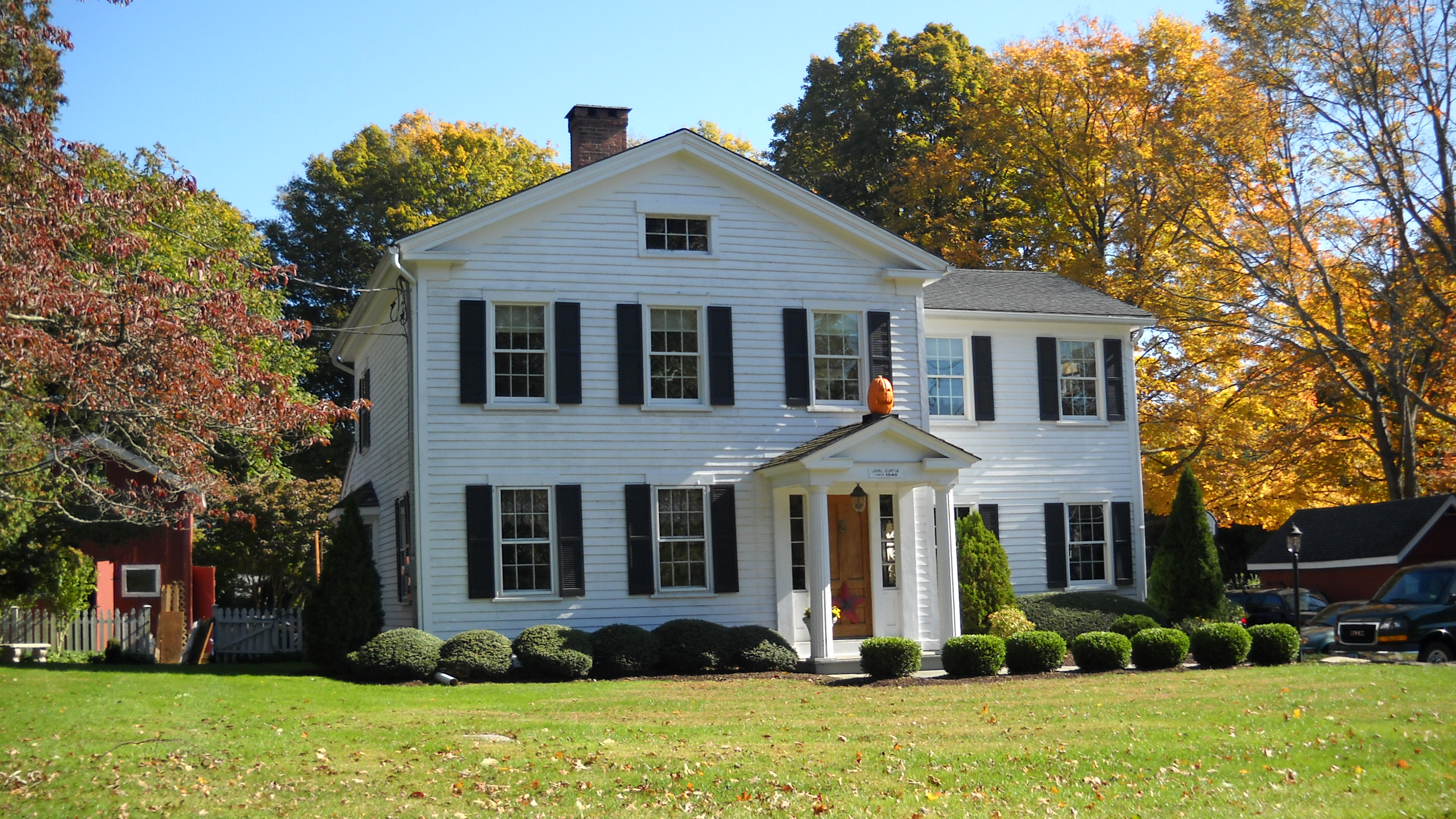
Joel Curtis House ca. 1840

== Farm Highway ==
The highway linking Nichols Farms to Stratford, three miles (5 km) to the south, was first called the Farm Highway, and was laid out or completed to the south side of Mischa Hill in December 1696. (In the 21st century, it is called Nichols Avenue or (Route 108). The highway was laid out to the south side of Mischa Hill and at Zachariah Curtiss, his land, and at Captain's Farm. Captain's Farm was the first farm encountered as travelers entered the village, at Hawley Lane, and was owned by Captain John Hawley at the time. This portion of Route 108 is considered to be the third-oldest documented highway in Connecticut.

== Merritt Parkway ==
The Merritt Parkway was built directly through the original Nichols Farms center in the late 1930s. It displaced the old Nichols Store, which was razed, and the Trinity Church, which was moved. A large 5' by 6' natural stepping stone was the only item saved from the Nichols Store; it was relocated to the front of the Ephraim Hawley House.

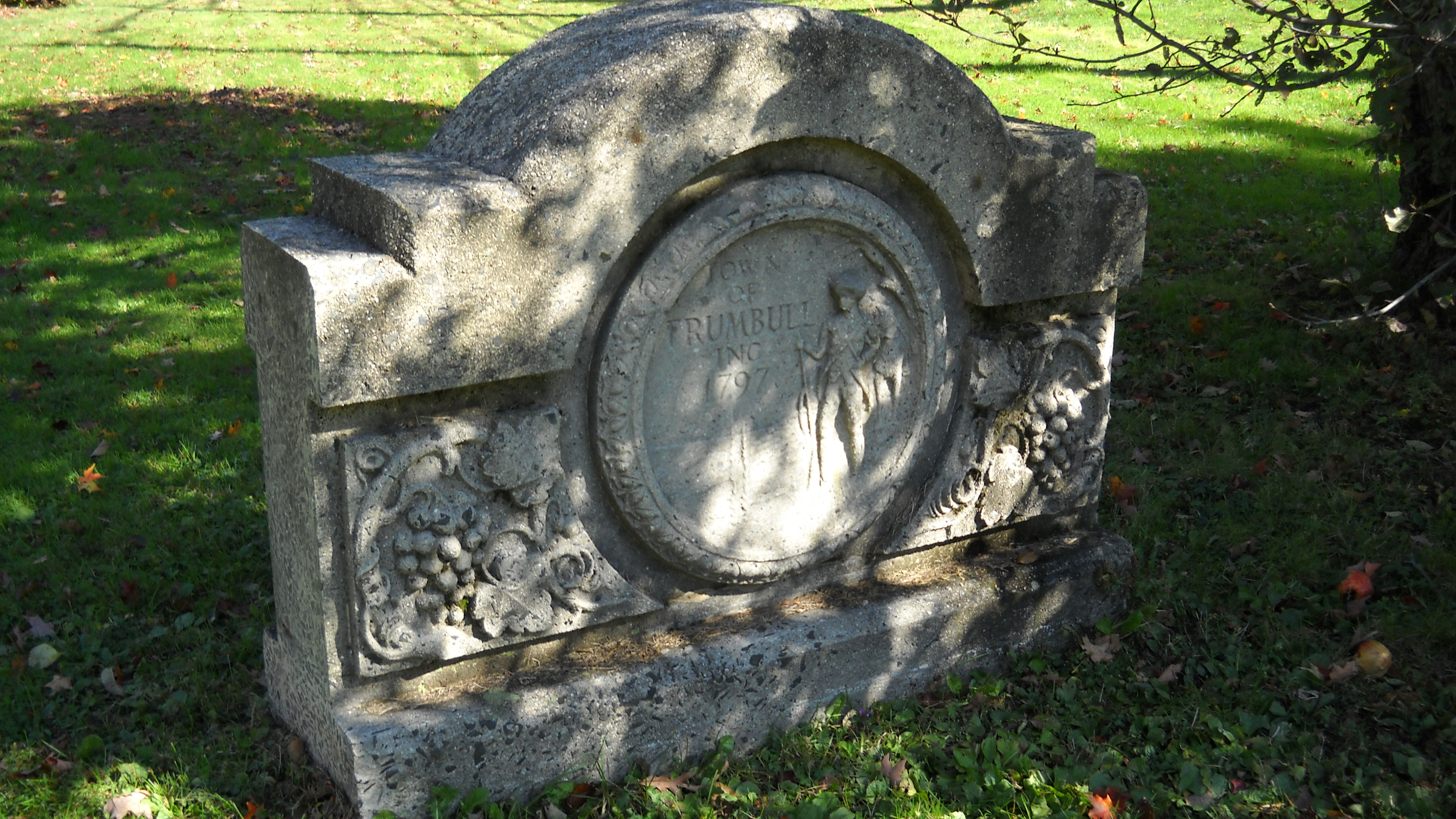
Town Seal from 1940 Merritt Parkway Bridge at Huntington Turnpike now demolished

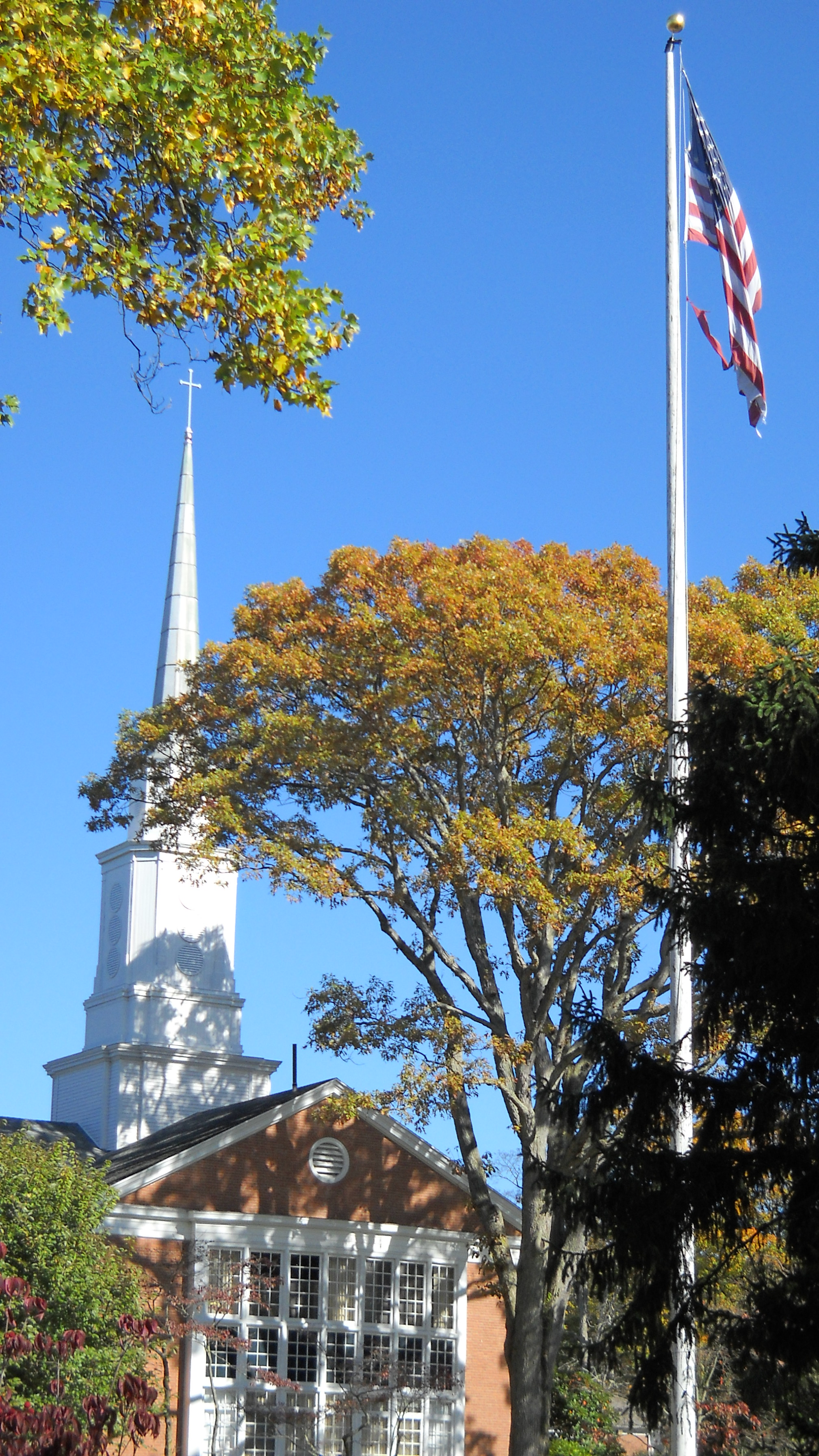
Circa 1932 Flag Pole NIA Green

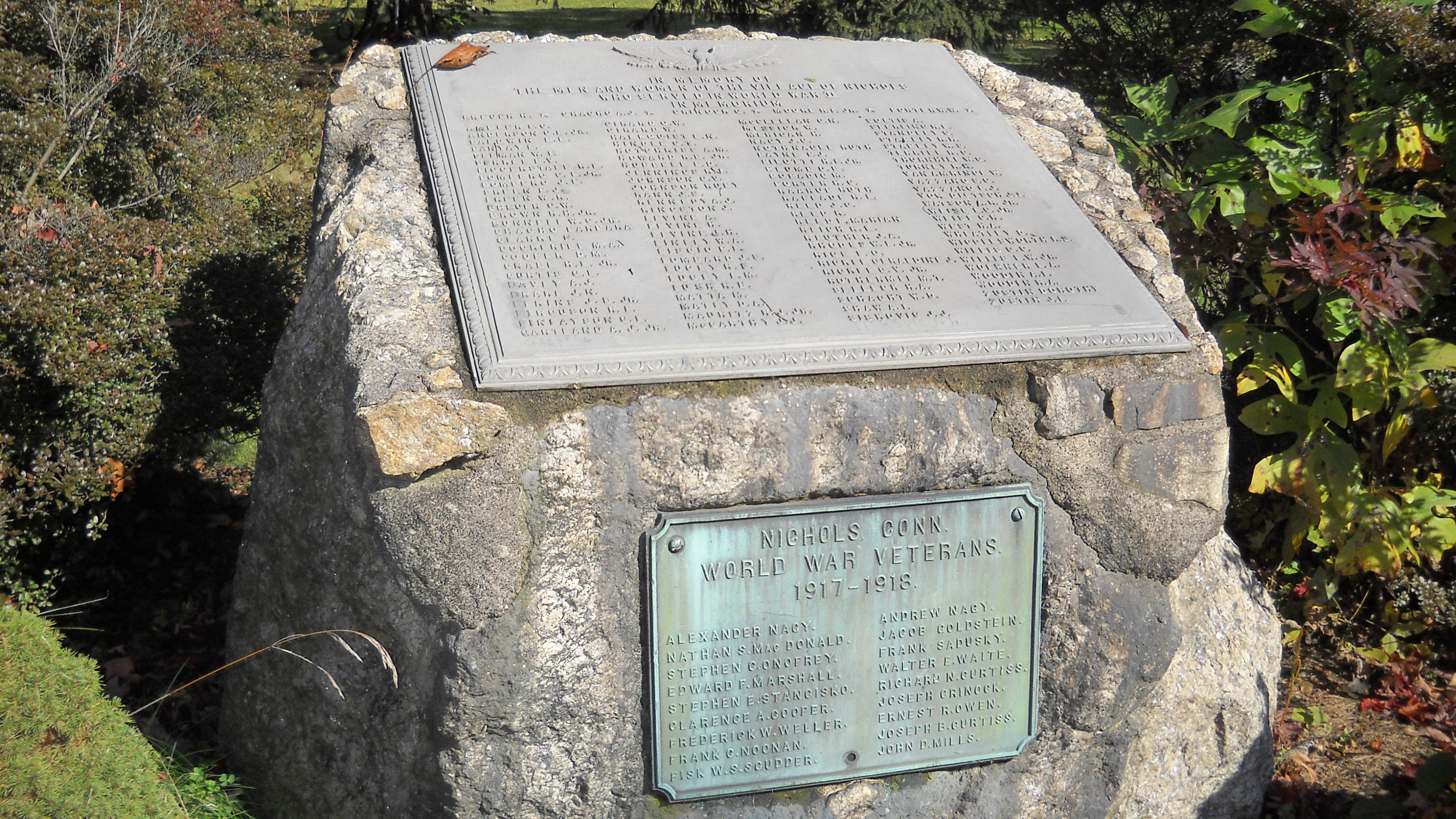
Monument to World War Veterans

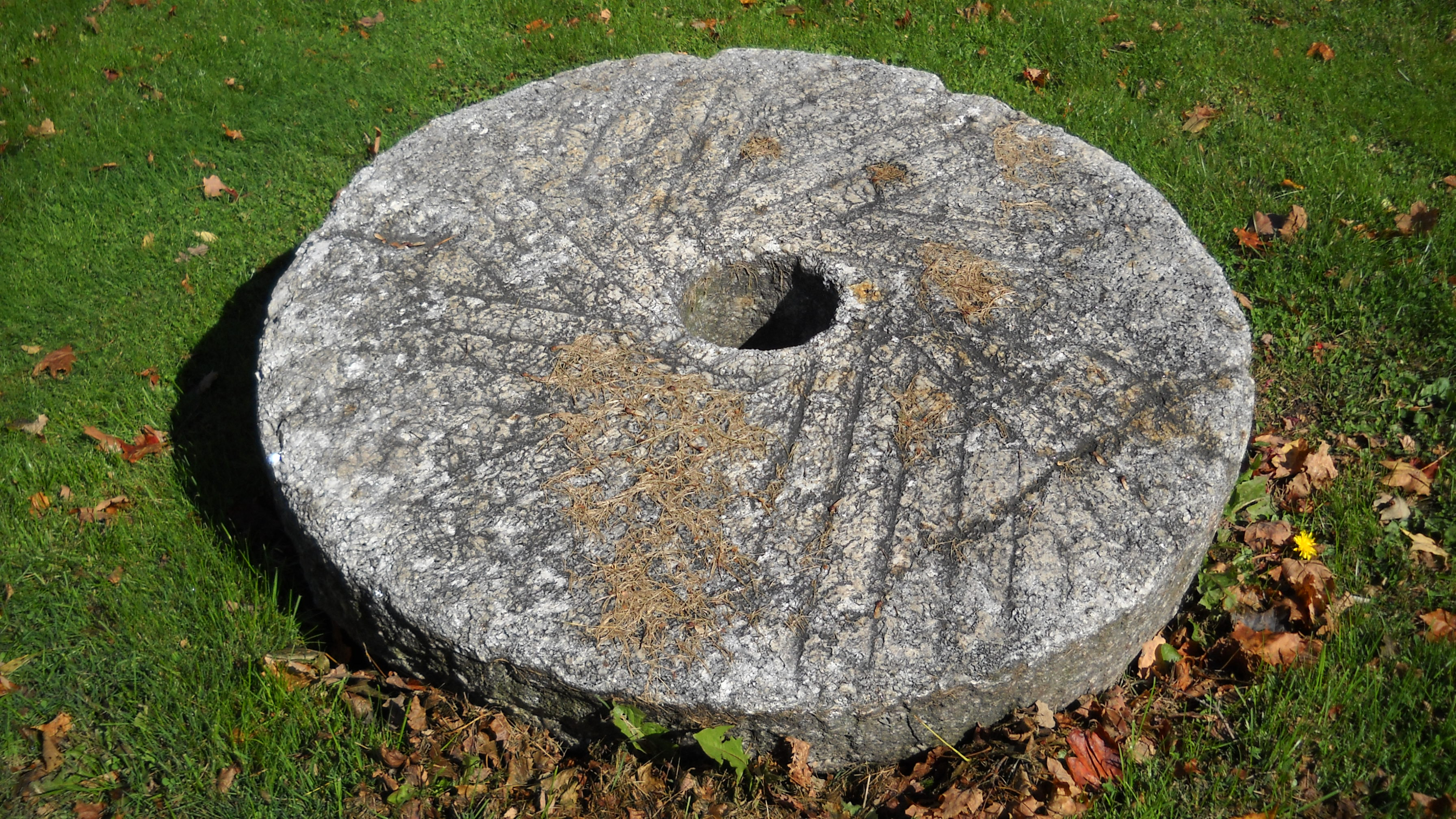
Fairchild Mill Grindstone Circa 1826

== Nichols Green ==
The green in Nichols Farms, known as Nichols Green or N.I.A. Green, is owned and maintained by a private trust called the Nichols Improvement Association, established in 1889 to beautify and improve Nichols Farms.

- A memorial to those residents who fought in World Wars I and II is located on the south end of the green.
- An 80' tall pine flagpole brought through the Panama Canal from Washington was erected on the green in 1932. This pine pole replaced an earlier 115' chestnut flagpole erected on July 4, 1892, that carried a 25' by 15' flag and was believed by some to be the highest flag flown in the state at the time.
- Another well-known landmark near the green is the Bunny Fountain. The fountain was a gift from the Peet family to the citizens of Nichols in 1895. The fountain was moved from its original location at the intersection of Huntington Turnpike and Shelton Road to the intersection of Huntington Turnpike and Unity Road in 1931 after being damaged by a car. It was moved to its present location and restored in the spring of 1971; it was restored again in 1992.
- An old grinding stone from the 1826 Fairchild (Paper) Mill is placed at the south end of the green. The mill was located at a place commonly called the Falls of the Pequonnock River beginning in 1674. This site is now the town boundary with Bridgeport called Fairchild Park.
- A piece of the original 1940 Merritt Parkway bridge, which was built over Route 108, is on the green. The concrete ornament is a likeness of the town of Trumbull official seal. The bridge was demolished in 1979 when the interchange was updated.

== Properties excluded ==
State officials excluded 78 buildings from the initial district that were located on Huntington Turnpike, Nichols Avenue and Shelton Road. These buildings were a part of the original district proposed by the Trumbull Historic District Study Committee for Nichols Farms in May 1976. The Ephraim Hawley House, Zachariah Curtiss House and barn, the summer home of American folklorist Will Geer, and a home of helicopter inventor Igor Sikorsky were excluded.

A subsequent Historic Building Survey, completed in 2010, has recommended these properties be added to the existing historic district.

== See also ==
- History of Trumbull, Connecticut
- Nichols, Connecticut
- National Register of Historic Places listings in Fairfield County, Connecticut

== Bibliography ==
- Trumbull Historical Society, History of Trumbull, Dodrasquicentennial, 1797-1972, 1972
- Reverend Samuel Orcutt, History of the Old Town of Stratford, Connecticut, Fairfield Historical Society, 1886
- Dorothy M. Seely, Tales of Trumbull's Past, Trumbull Historical Society, 1984
