= Nichols, Connecticut =

Village in Trumbull, Connecticut

Coordinates: 41.2417°N 73.1616°W

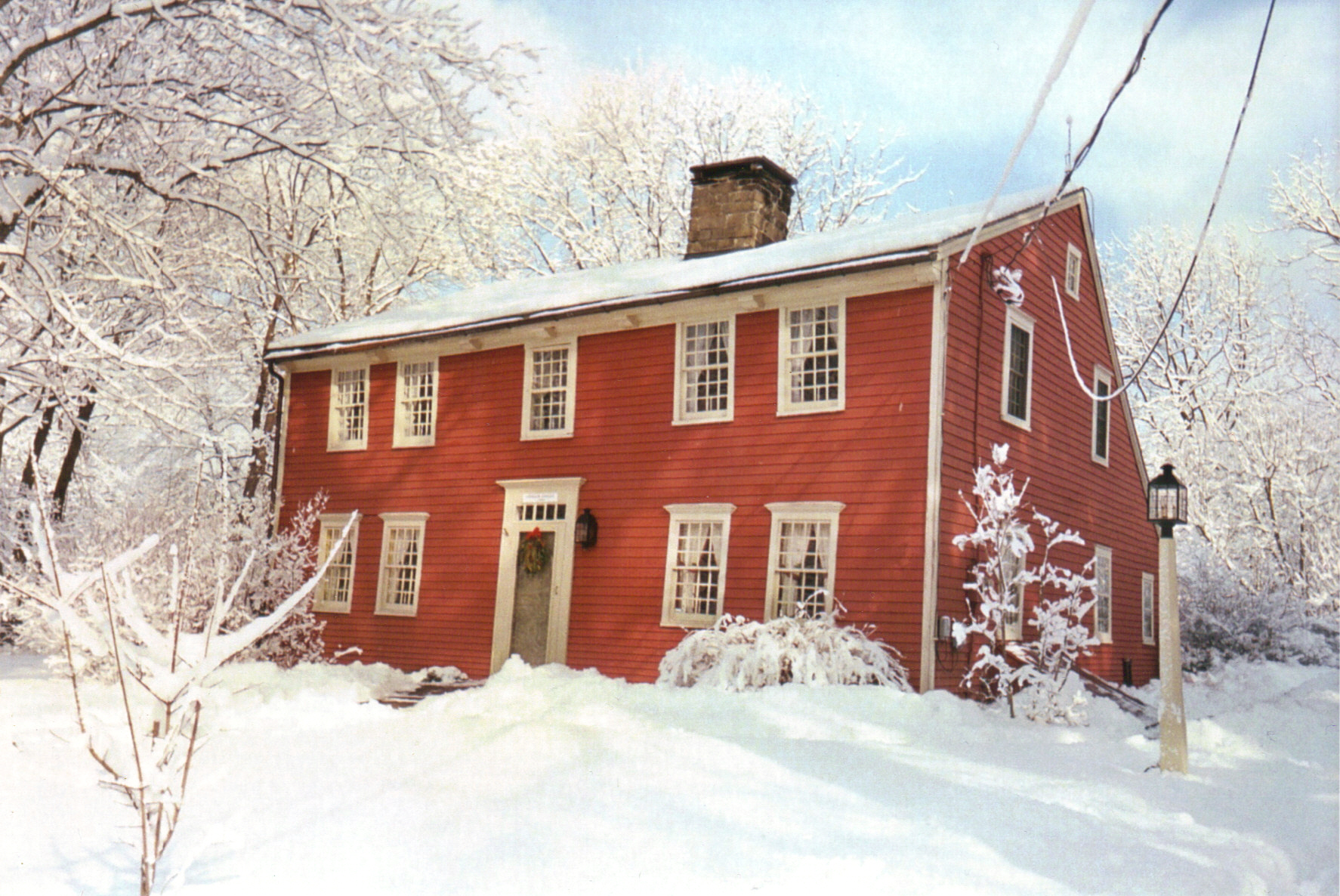
Ephraim Hawley House built in 1683

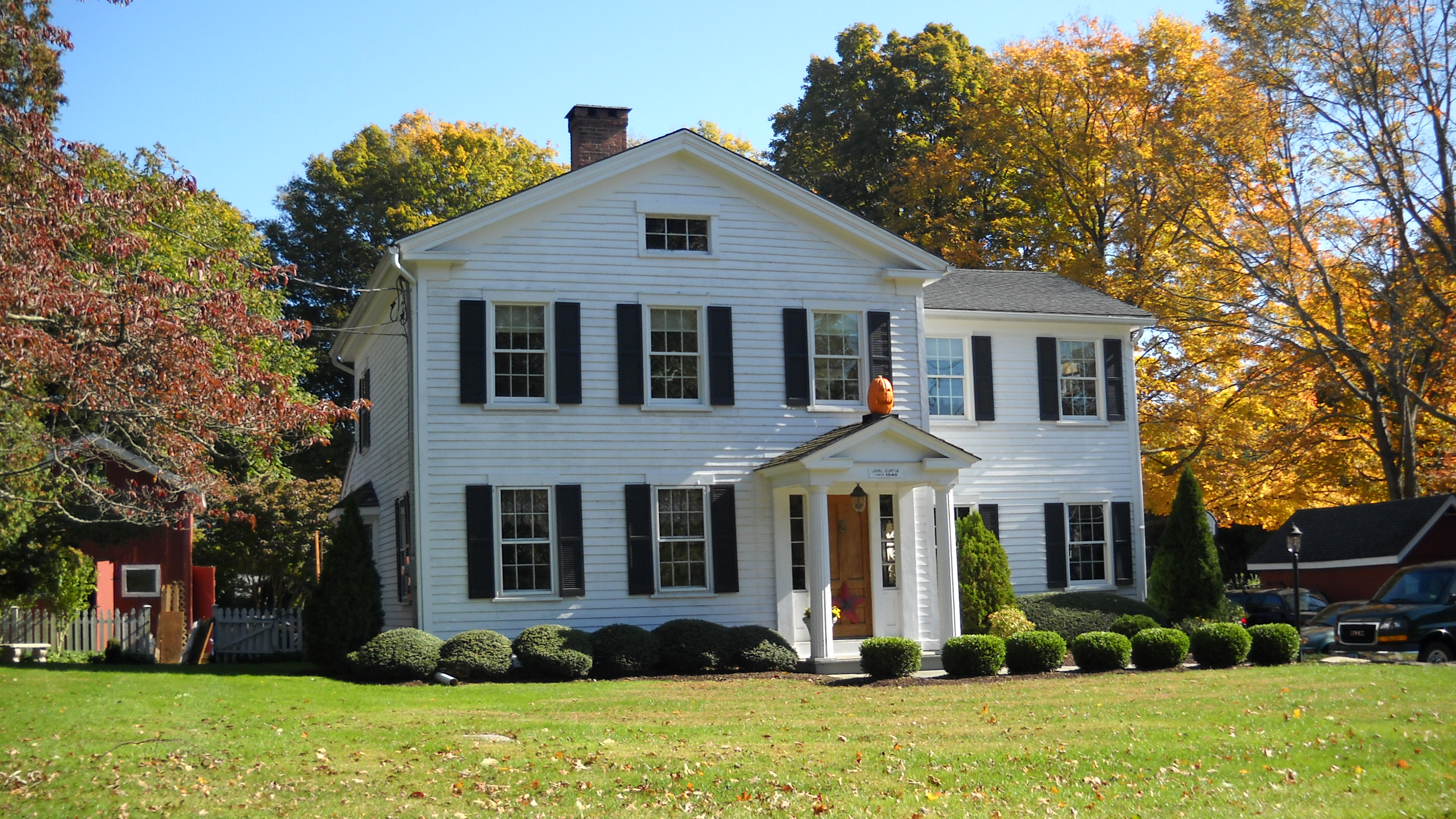
Joel Curtis House built in 1840

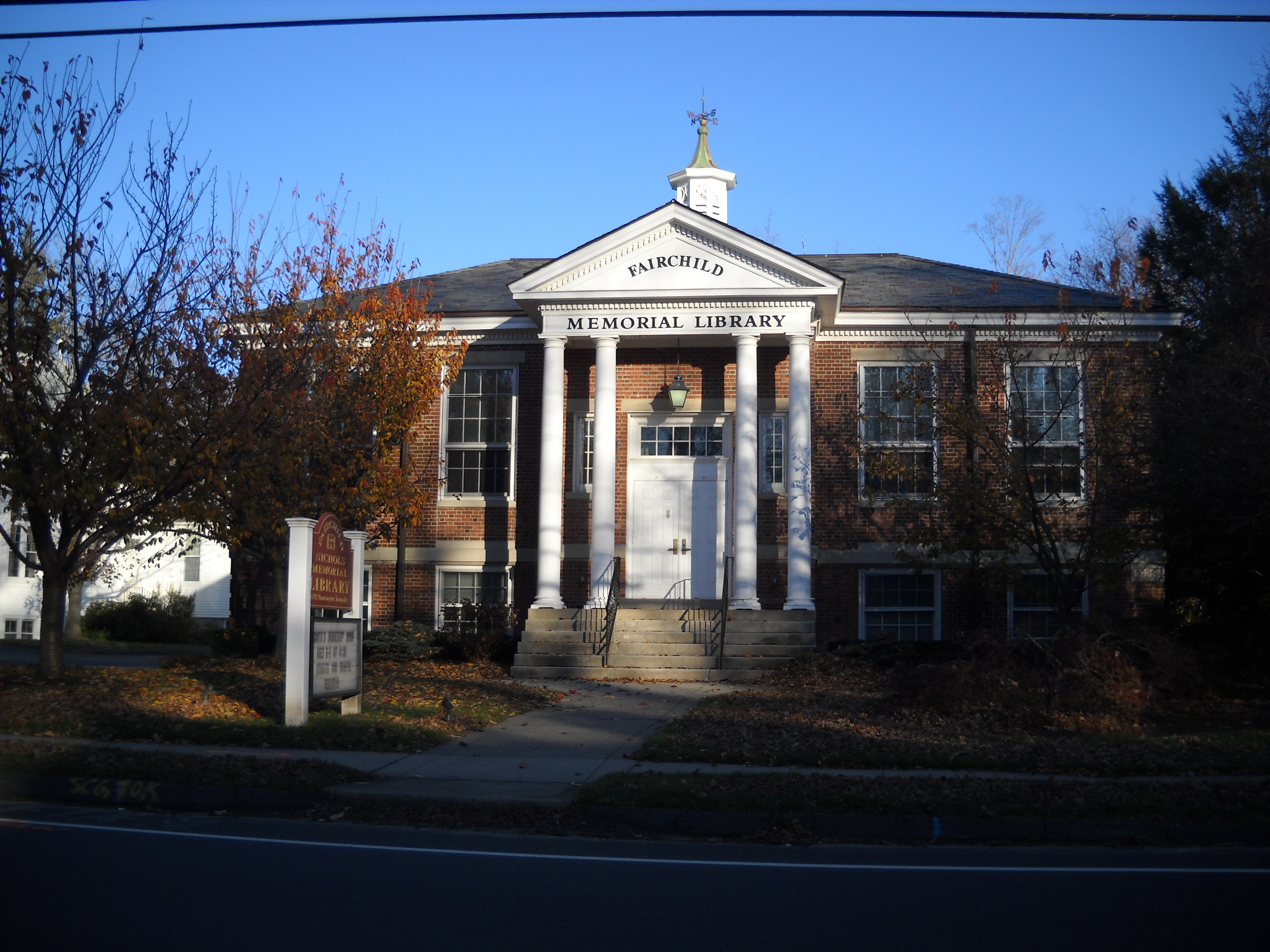
Fairchild-Nichols Library built in 1925

Nichols, a historic village in southeastern Trumbull in Fairfield County, Connecticut, United States, is named after the family who maintained a large farm in its center for almost 300 years. The Nichols Farms Historic District, which encompasses part of the village, is listed on the National Register of Historic Places. Originally home to the Golden Hill Paugussett Indian Nation, the area was colonized by the English during the Great Migration of the 1630s as a part of the coastal settlement of Stratford. The construction of the Merritt Parkway through the village, and the subsequent closing of stores and factories, turned the village into a bedroom community in 1939. Aviation pioneer Igor Sikorsky lived in three separate homes in Nichols during his active years between 1928 and 1951, when he designed, built and flew fixed-wing aircraft and put the helicopter into mass production for the first time.

== Golden Hill Paugussett Indian Nation ==
The Golden Hill Paugussett Indian Nation is a Connecticut state-recognized tribe, descendants of the Paugussett (also Paugusset) Nation of Native Americans, who occupied much of western Connecticut prior to the arrival of Europeans. While state-recognized, they have been denied federal recognition. The tribe lives in Colchester, Connecticut, where it has a 106-acre (0.43 km^{2}) reservation, and also has a 1/4-acre (0.0010 km^{2}) reservation in Nichols, which is considered to be the oldest continuing reservation in Connecticut and the smallest in the US.

== History ==
As the first volume of Stratford land records were destroyed in 1650, early records of English settlement are not available. In 1661, the Stratford selectmen voted to allow all inhabitants the liberty of taking up a whole division of land anywhere they could find fit planting ground, as long as it was not within two miles (3 km) of the town meeting house. They were prohibited from making it their dwelling place without consent. Elder Phillip Groves, Captain William Curtiss and Lt. Joseph Judson, early landowners in Nichols, were named to a committee to lay out the land as they saw fit. Before 1661, people were free to take up planting grounds anywhere within the township. The common land in Nichols Farms was divided and granted to individuals beginning in 1670 as a part of the three-mile or woods division and continued up to 1800.

Nichol's Farms in 1867

=== Agriculture ===
Mischa Hill is located in the geographic center of Nichols. This area was first called Misha Hill or Lt. Joseph Judson's Farm in the land records. It was the first area within Trumbull to be settled due to its already cleared planting fields, fertile soil, spring-fed ponds, meadows and its close proximity to the main village, only three miles away.

Lt. Joseph Judson, Sgt. Jeremiah Judson, and John Curtiss established farms on Mischa Hill before 1658, the year they were elected freeman (Colonial) by the legislature of the Connecticut Colony. To be elected as a freeman, at this time, an individual had to own real property in his own name.

Other early landowners included; Benjamin Beach, William Beardsley, Richard Booth, Zachariah Bostick, John Brinsmaid, John Curtiss, Benjamin Curtiss, Joseph Curtiss, Captain William Curtiss, Ebenezer Curtiss, Zachariah Curtiss, Joseph Fairchild, Elder Philip Groves, Joseph Hawley (Captain), Samuel Hawley, Ephraim Hawley, John Hurd, Lt. Joseph Judson, Jeremiah Judson, Isaac Judson, Isaac Nichols, Caleb Nichols, Abraham Nichols, Samuel Uffoot and Reverend Zachariah Walker.

=== Religious rift ===
In the 1660s, Lt. Joseph Judson began a disagreement with the majority of elders in town as he and others tried to introduce the half way covenant. In 1671, Judson obtained permission from Governor John Winthrop, Jr. to remove with other families and settle a new town called Woodbury. Judson and the other Woodbury founders, either sold, gifted or abandoned their farms in Nichols.

In 1688, John Curtiss removed to Woodbury, giving his entire farm on Mischa Hill to his son Benjamin, who had married Joseph Judson's daughter. Shortly after Judson and the others had abandoned their farms in Nichols to remove to Woodbury in 1673, the area was commonly referred to as Old Farm, Old Farms and Judson's Farm's in the Stratford land records.

=== Abraham Nichols ===
Abraham Nichols is credited, by some, with being the first Englishman to settle in Trumbull around 1690 or 1700, depending on the source. It has been said that others soon followed him into the wilderness to; "establish mills, churches, and schools". Nichols landholdings were said to total as much as 3,000 acres (12 km^{2}). However, none of these claims can be substantiated by the public land records.

According to Walter Nicholls, who wrote the History of the Nichols family in 1909, Abraham did not accompany his father to Woodbury in 1673, but remained in Trumbull to oversee the plantation. Since Abraham was only eleven in 1673 (born 1662), it is likely that he removed to Woodbury with his family, and later returned to Trumbull between 1696 and 1700 as an adult. According to the public land records, Nichols owned 285 acres (1.15 km^{2}) of land, purchased between 1696 and 1700, of which 55 acres (0.22 km^{2}) remains as open space today.

The last Nichols to reside on the farm was Florence, who married George Woods in 1903. Soon after their deaths in 1973 and 1972 respectively, the property was donated to the Nichols Methodist Church, as Florence and George Woods had bequeathed. The Town of Trumbull purchased the land from the church in 1974. This tract was then known as the Woods Estate, and is now the home of the Trumbull Historical Society.

=== Development ===
Nichols is named for the family that maintained a large farm in its geographic center for almost three hundred years. In May 1725, the northwest farmers of Stratford petitioned the Colony of Connecticut to form their own village. The farmers wished to call their new Parish Nichol's Farms. The legislature approved their new village in October 1725, but named the new parish Unity. Unity became a part of North Stratford in 1744 when it merged with the parish of Long Hill, Trumbull, which had been founded in 1740. When it incorporated in 1797, the Nichols village became a school and taxing district as a part of the Town of Trumbull.

== Nichols Green ==
The Nichols Green or N.I.A. Green, is owned and maintained by a private trust called the Nichols Improvement Association, established in 1889 to beautify and improve the village.

- A memorial to those residents who fought in World Wars I and II is located on the south end of the green.
- An 80' tall pine flagpole brought through the Panama Canal from Washington was erected on the green in 1932. This pine pole replaced an earlier 115' chestnut flagpole erected on July 4, 1892 that carried a 25' by 15' flag and was believed by some to be the highest flag flown in the state at the time.
- Another landmark near the green is the Bunny Fountain. The fountain was a gift from the Peet family to the citizens of Nichols in 1895. Originally installed at the intersection of Huntington Turnpike and Shelton Road, it was moved to the Turnpike and Unity Road in 1931. In the spring of 1971, it was restored and moved to its present location. It was restored again in 1992.
- An old grinding stone from the 1826 Fairchild (Paper) Mill is placed at the south end of the green. The mill was located at the Falls of the Pequonnock River beginning in 1674; the area is now called Fairchild Park and marks the Town boundary with Bridgeport.
- A piece of the original 1940 Merritt Parkway bridge, which was built over Huntington Turnpike, is installed on the green. The concrete ornament is a likeness of the town of Trumbull official seal. The bridge was demolished in 1979 when the interchange was updated.

== Pinewood Lake ==
Then called Pine Brook Country Club, Pinewood Lake is notable for having served as the summer rehearsal headquarters of the Group Theatre from New York City. Formed in 1931 by Harold Clurman, Cheryl Crawford and Lee Strasberg, the Group Theatre and had a vision of doing socially responsible works that would raise community consciousness. It was composed of actors, directors, playwrights and producers. The Group gathered to rehearse in the countryside every summer during the 1930s of the Great Depression. They spent the summer of 1936 at Pinewood Lake. During this time, they produced works by the most important American playwrights. Their emphasis on realistic dramas changed stage and film forever.

== Nichols Avenue ==
The road linking the village of Nichols to Stratford center, three miles (5 km) to the south, was first called the Farm Highway, now called Nichols Avenue (or Route 108). The historic road was laid out or surveyed to the south side of Mischa Hill in Nichols on December 7, 1696. The highway was described as being completed to the south side of Mischa Hill and at Zachariah Curtiss, his land, and at Captain's Farm.

In October 1725, when the Connecticut Colony approved the Parish of Unity, they referred to the Farm Highway as Nickol's Farm's Road. The Nichols Avenue portion of Route 108 in Trumbull is the third-oldest documented highway in Connecticut, after the Mohegan Road, Connecticut Route 32 in Norwich (1670) and the King's Highway, or Boston Post Road Route 1 (1673).

== Merritt Parkway ==
The Merritt Parkway was built directly through the center of Nichols in the late 1930s displacing a residence and the old Nichols Store, which were razed, and the Trinity Church which was moved a few hundred feet to the north. The large 5' by 6' natural stepping stone was the only item saved from the old Nichols Store and was relocated to the front of the Ephraim Hawley House. In 1979, the original Huntington Turnpike Overpass was demolished and a new bridge was built in its place when the interchange was updated. When the original 1940 overpass was demolished, the cast-iron grills that resembled a trellis with a grapevine were salvaged restored and placed as decorative items on the replacement Huntington Turnpike Underpass. The new bridge is not listed on the NRHP.

== Notable people, past and present ==
- Dick Allen ( 1939-2017), American poet and former poet laureate of the state of Connecticut.
- James Beebe (1717–1785), Reverend Unity Parish from 1747 to 1785, Army Preacher in the French and Indian War and patriot.
- Truman Bradley (1826–1900), American Indian from the Schaghticoke tribe.
- Will Geer, (1902–78), actor and folklorist
- Robert Hawley, (1729–1799), Captain local militia during American Revolutionary War.
- Carolyn Hax (b. 1966), writer and columnist for The Washington Post and the author of the advice column "Tell Me About It".
- Joseph Judson (1619-1690), early settler, militia officer and elected official, negotiated Long Hill Purchase from the Paugussett Indians.
- Igor Sikorsky (1889–1972), aviation pioneer and helicopter inventor.

== Images ==
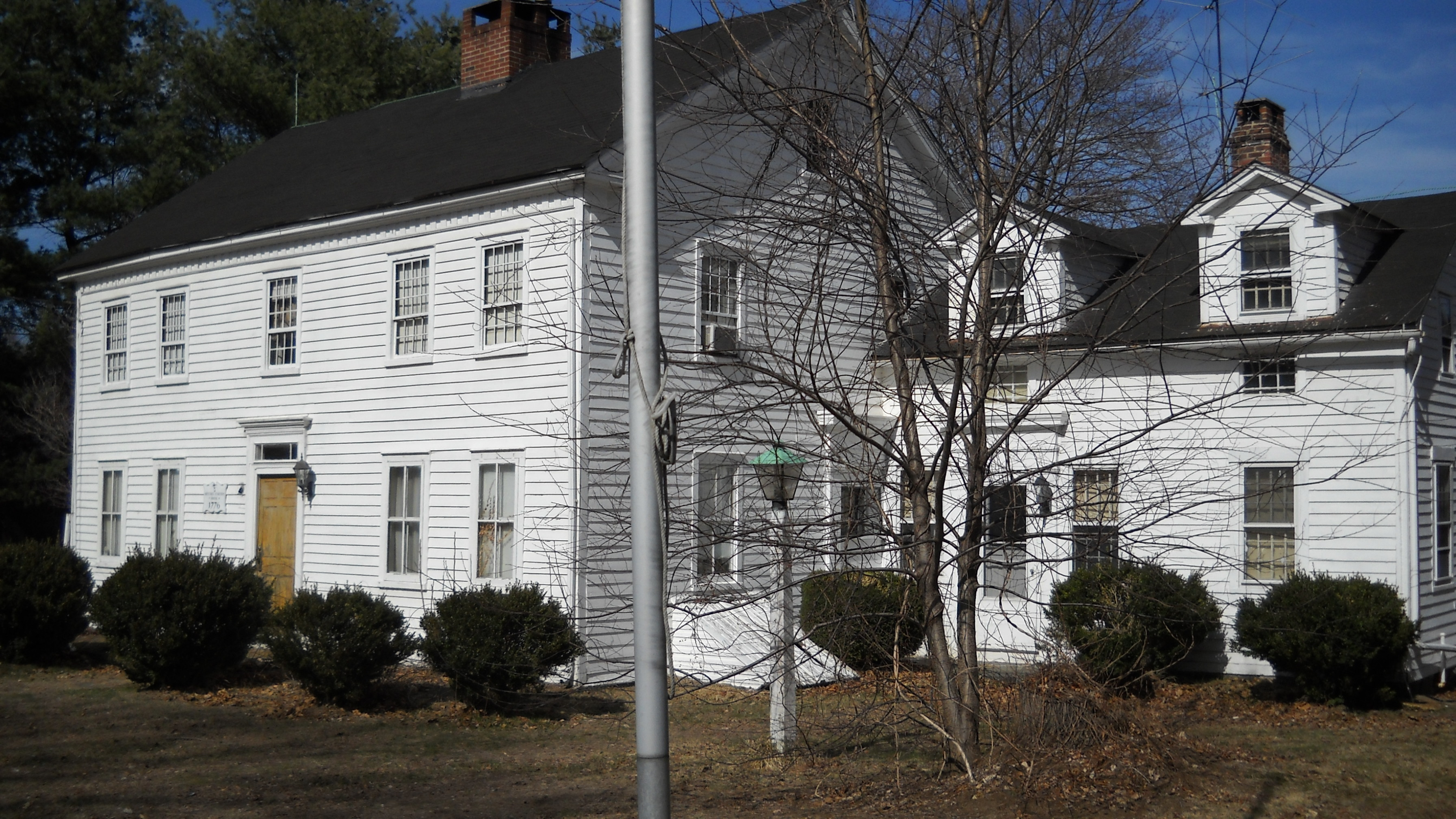
Zachariah Curtiss House c. 1721, ell c. 1800

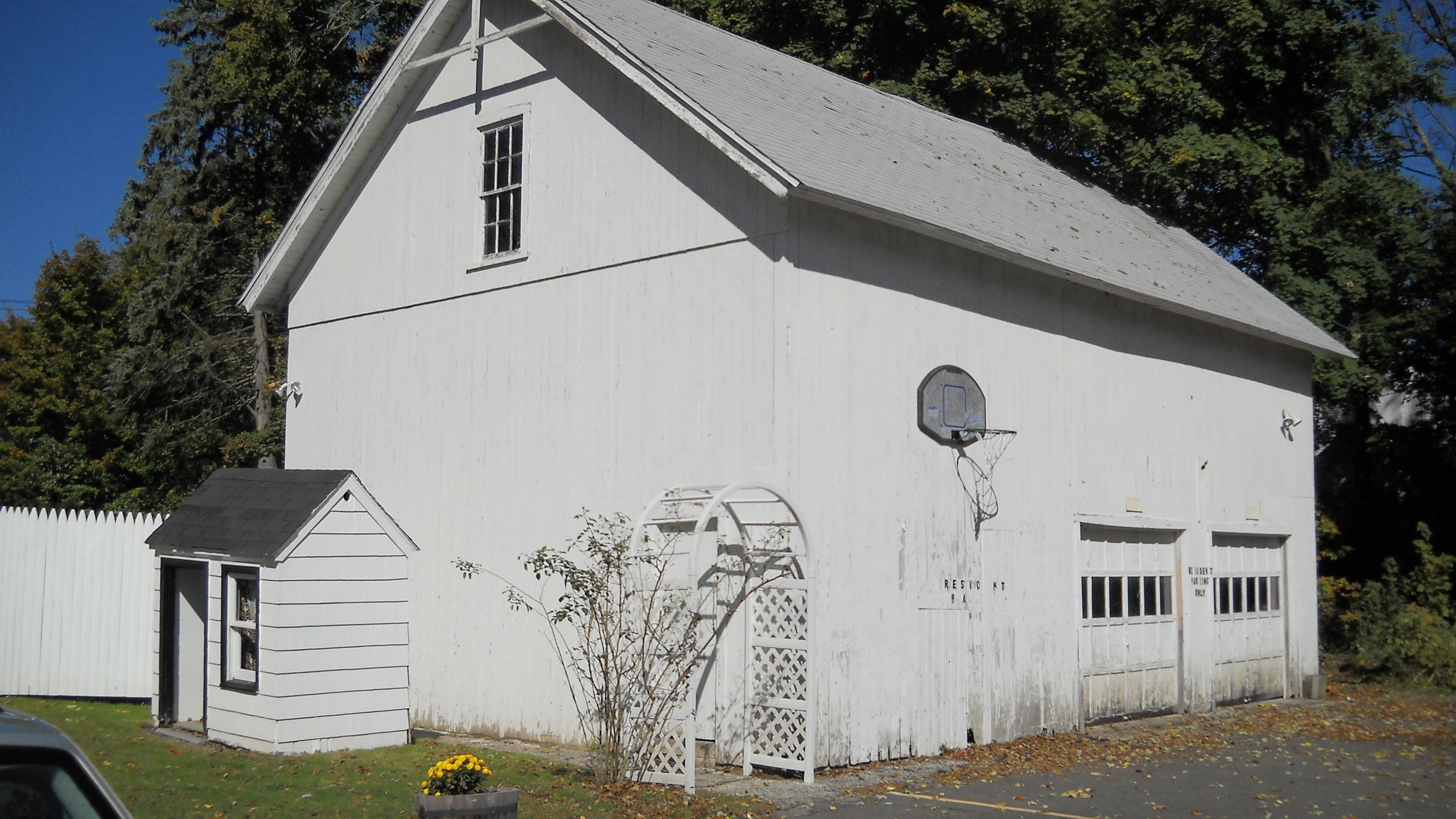
Peet barn ca. 1700 (house demolished)

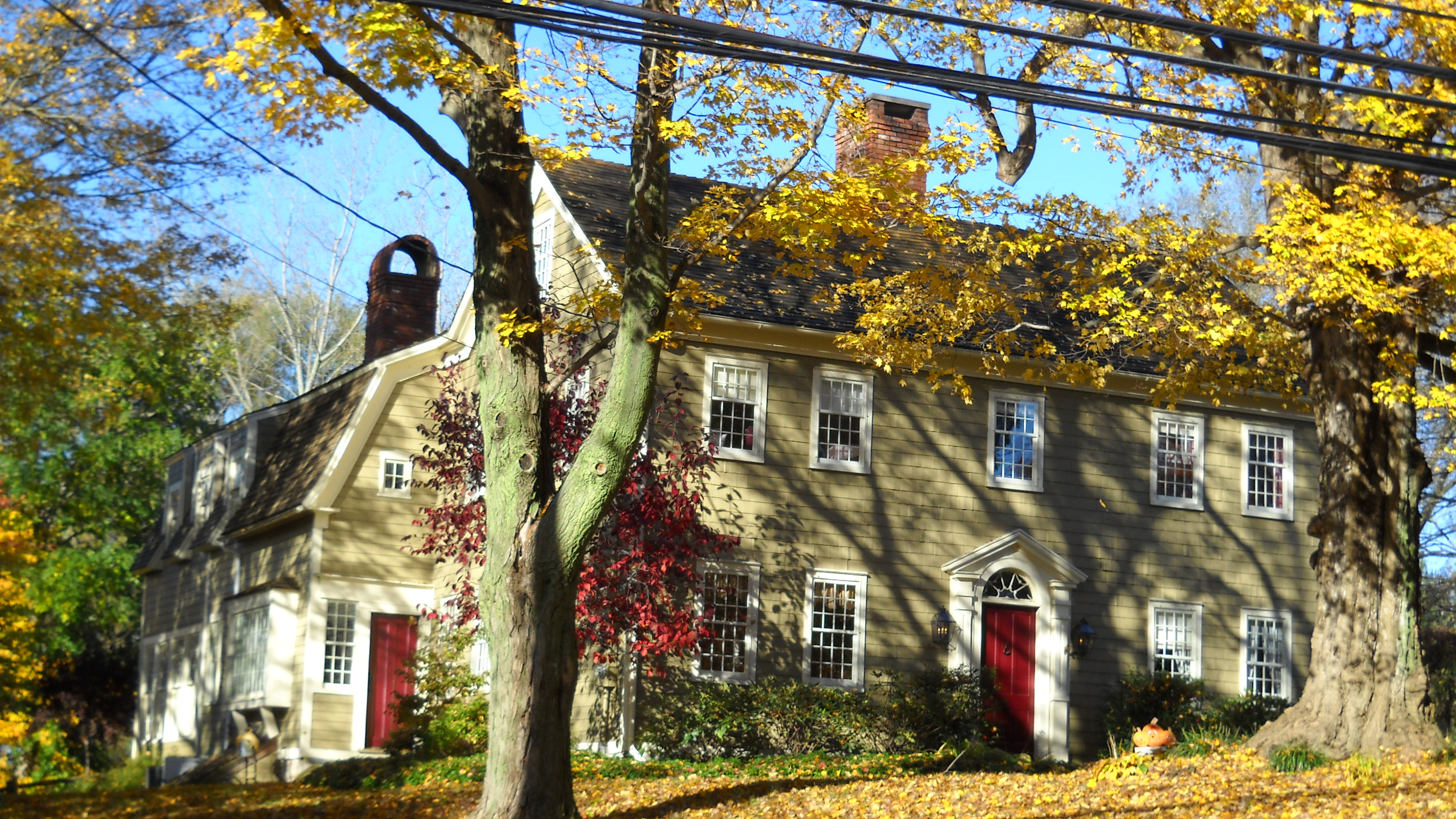
Joseph Plumb House ca. 1780

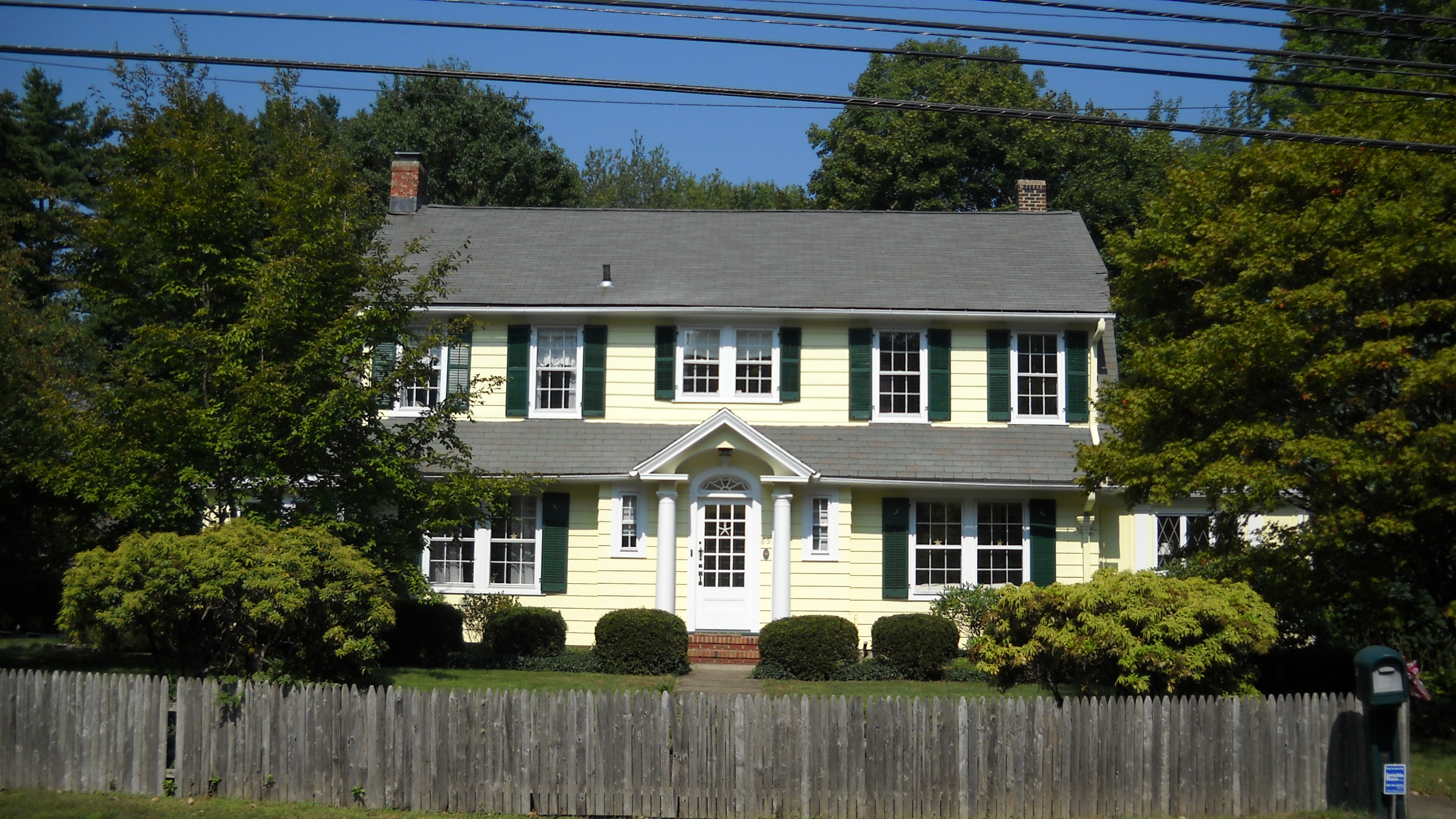
Igor Sikorsky home 1928–1934

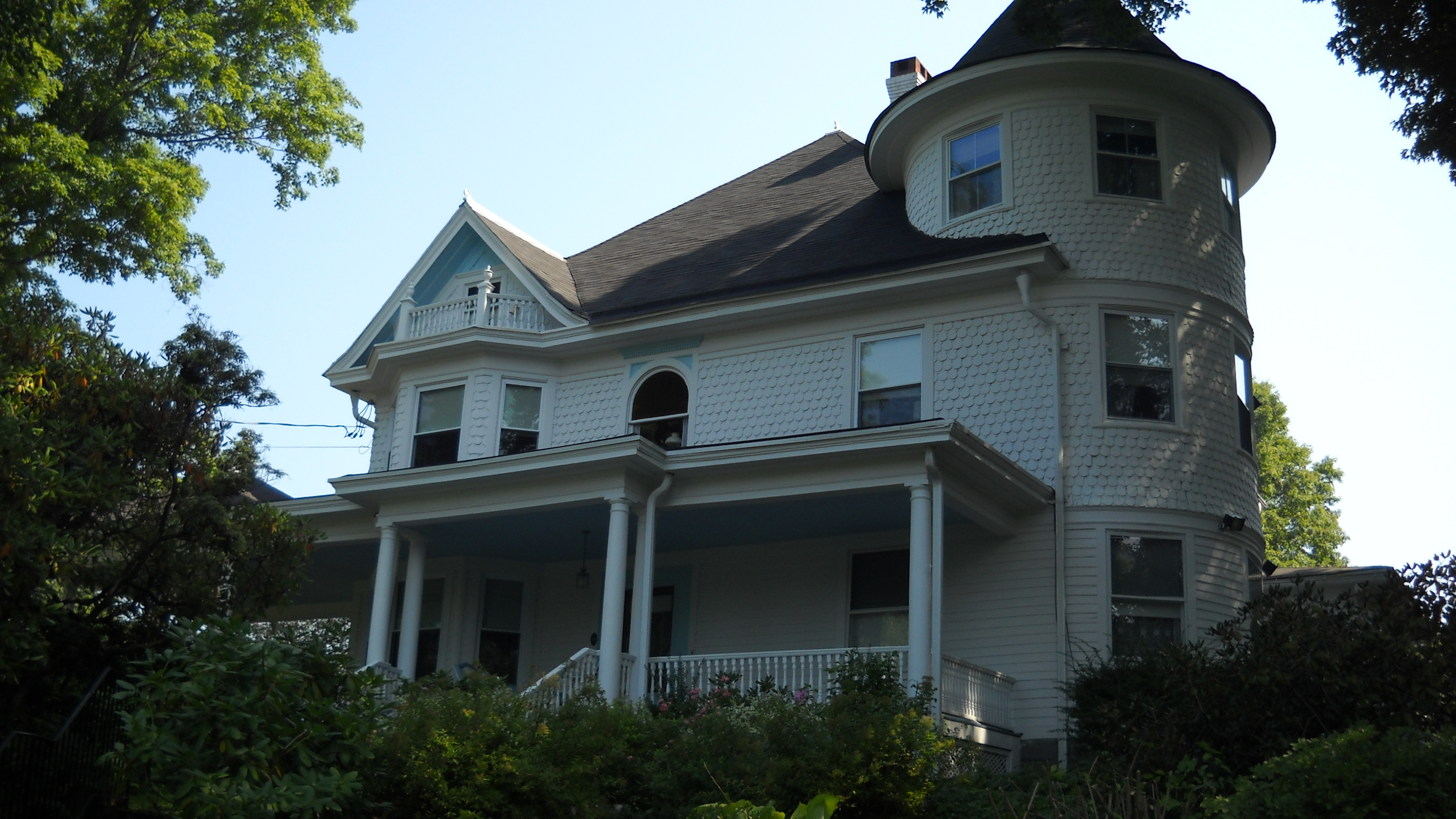
Igor Sikorsky home 1945–1948

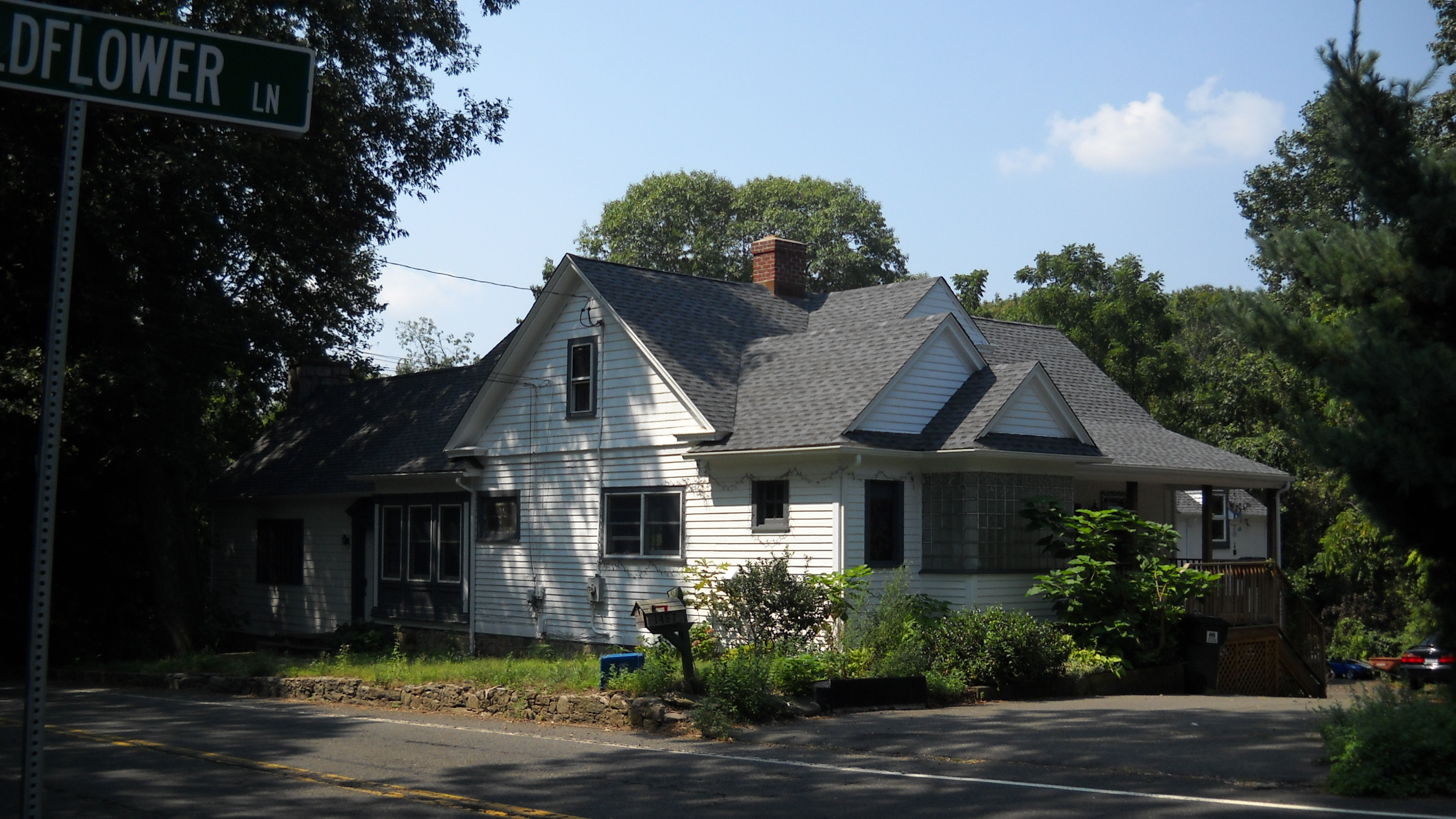
Igor Sikorsky home 1948–1951

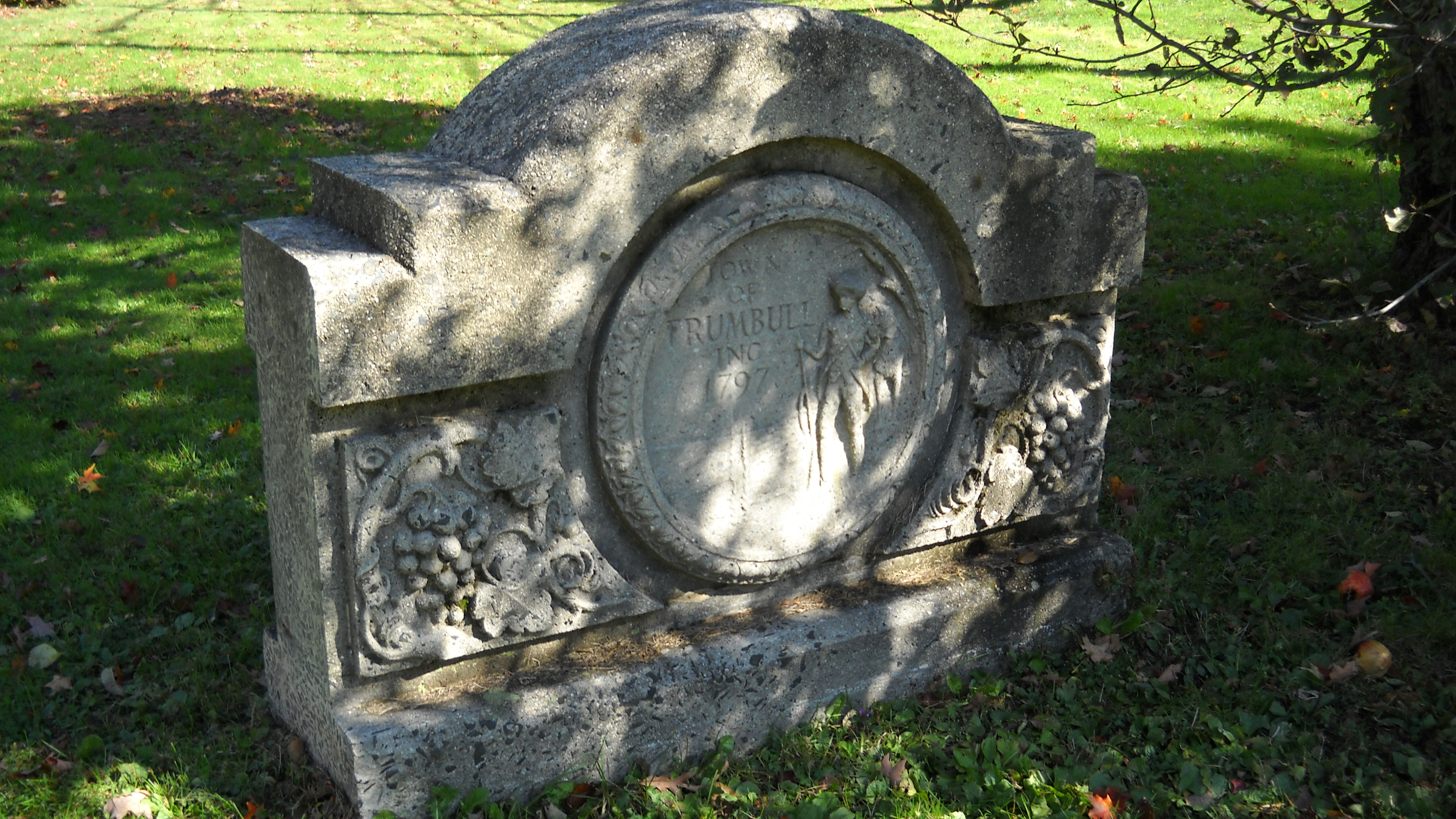
Town Seal from 1940 Merritt Parkway Bridge at Huntington Turnpike now demolished

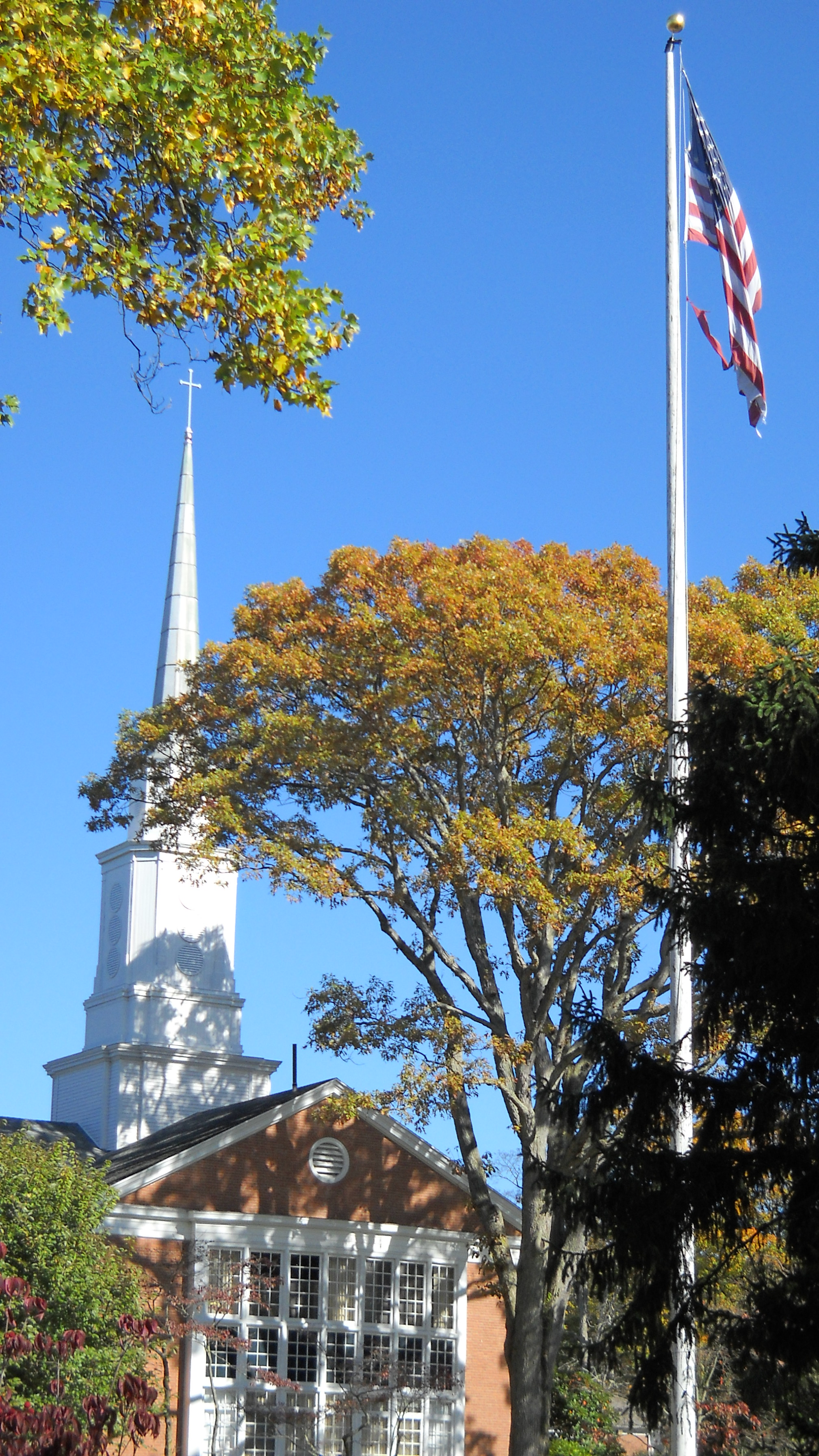
Circa 1932 Flag Pole NIA Green

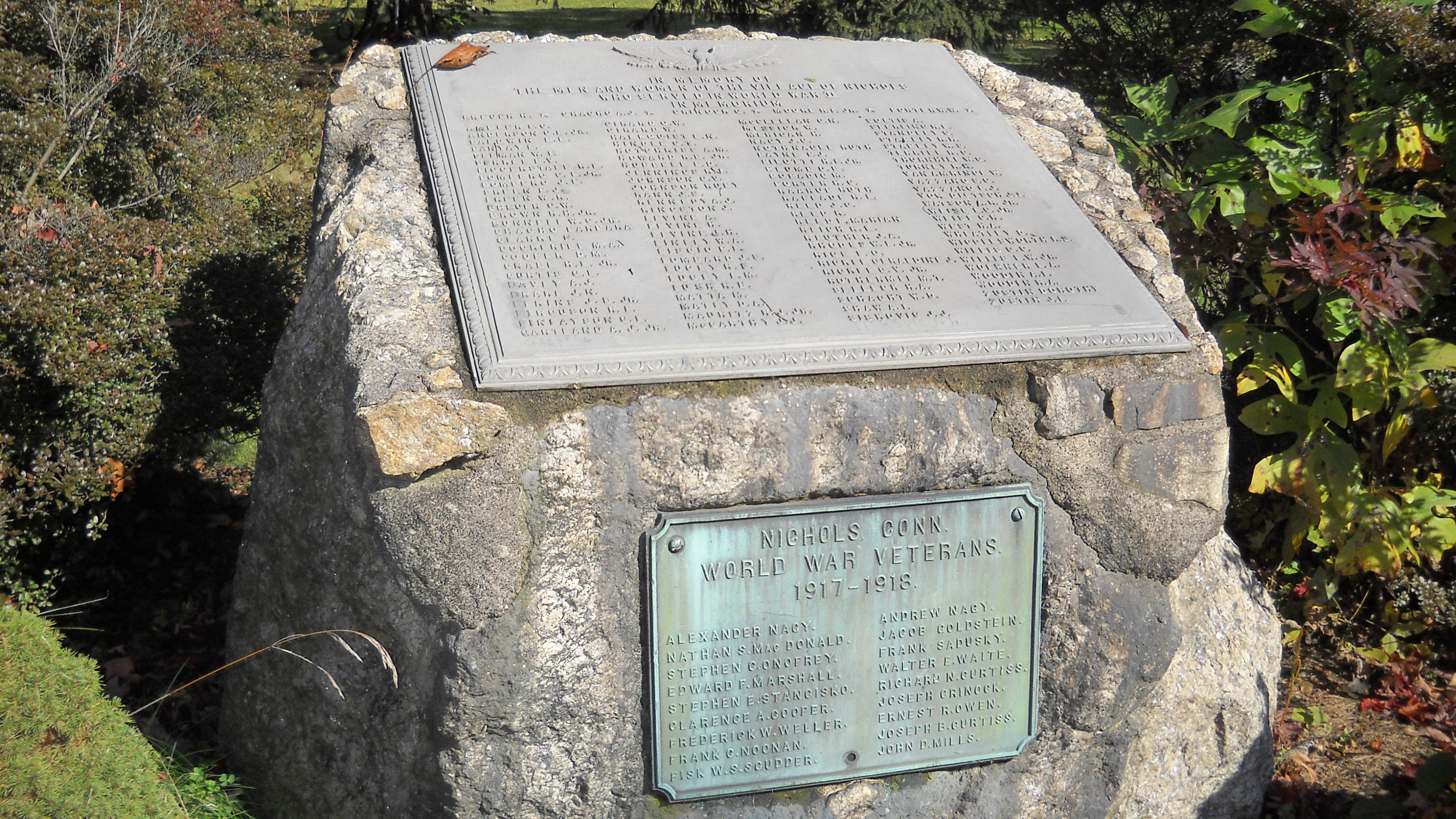
Monument to World War Veterans

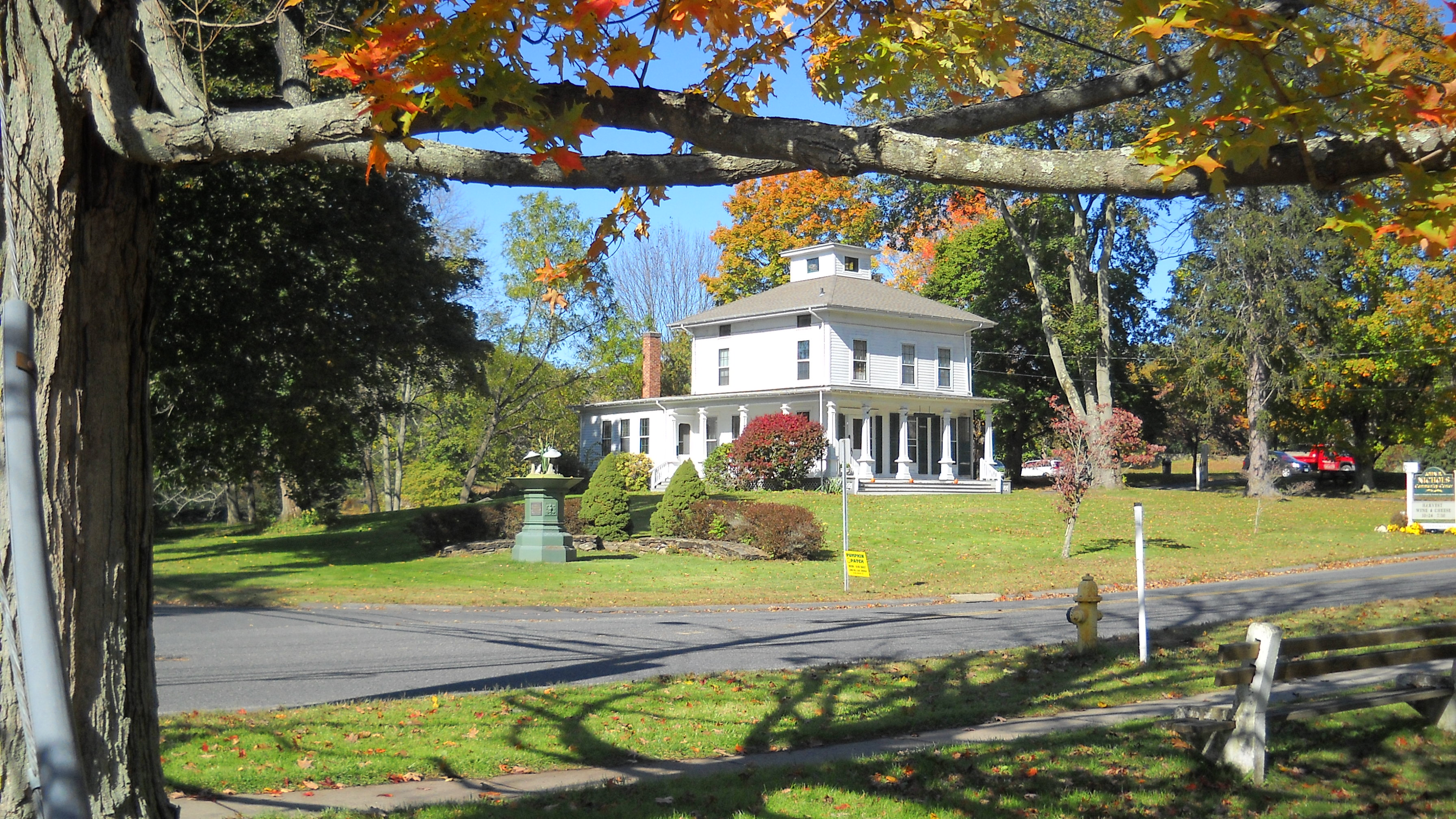
N.I.A. Starkweather House and Peet Fountain view from green

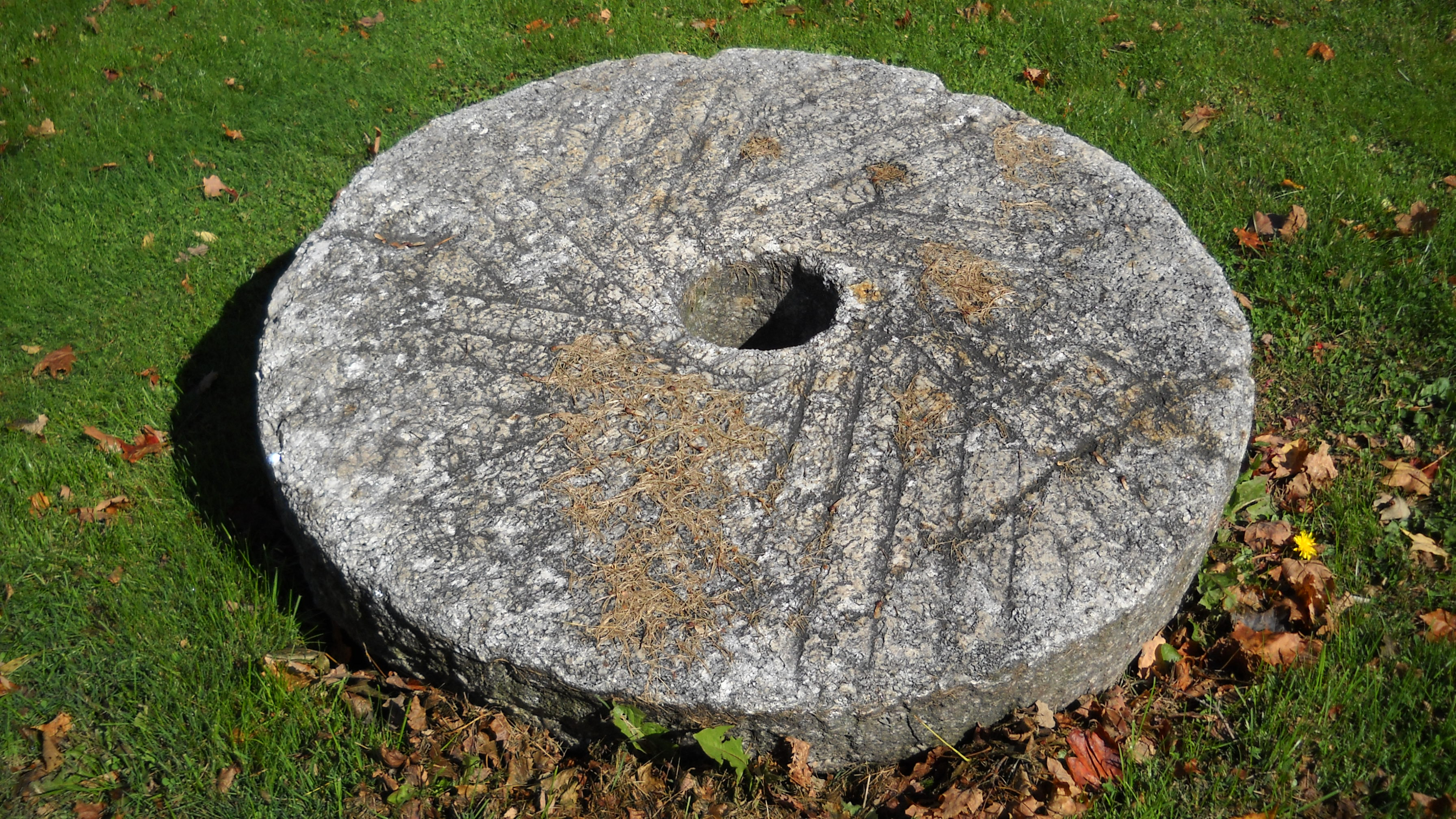
Fairchild Mill Grindstone Circa 1826

== Bibliography ==
- Trumbull Historical Society, History of Trumbull, Dodrasquicentennial, 1797-1972, 1972
- Reverend Samuel Orcutt, History of the Old Town of Stratford, Connecticut, Fairfield Historical Society, 1886
- Dorothy M. Seely, Tales of Trumbull's Past, Trumbull Historical Society, 1984
