= Connecticut Route 108 =

State highway in Fairfield County, Connecticut, US

Route 108
- Map of Fairfield County in southwestern Connecticut with Route 108 highlighted in red

Route information
- Maintained by CTDOT
- Length: 11.05 mi (17.78 km)
- Existed: 1932–present

Major junctions
- South end: US 1 in Stratford
- Route 8 / Route 15 / Merritt Parkway in Trumbull
- North end: Route 110 in Shelton

Location
- Country: United States
- State: Connecticut
- Counties: Fairfield

Highway system
- Connecticut State Highway System; Interstate; US; State; SSR; SR; Scenic
| ← Route 107 | → Route 109 |

Route 108 in the U.S. state of Connecticut, locally called Nichols Avenue and Huntington Turnpike, is a two-lane state highway that runs northerly from US Route 1, Boston Post Road in Stratford, through Trumbull, to Route 110 in Downtown Shelton. Originally called the Farm Highway, it was laid out to the south side of Mischa Hill in Trumbull on December 7, 1696, and is considered to be the third oldest documented highway in Connecticut after the Mohegan Road (Route 32) in Norwich (1670) and the Boston Post Road or US 1 (1673).

The section of Nichols Avenue from the Stratford-Trumbull town line to Huntington Turnpike in Trumbull is known as the Trooper Ernest Morse Memorial Highway, named in honor of a state trooper who was killed by gunfire on February 13, 1953, while trying to apprehend a suspect in a car theft.

== Route description ==
Route 108 begins at US 1 (Barnum Avenue) in Stratford and proceeds north out of Stratford center intersecting with North Avenue and Second Hill Lane. It continues northward over Third Hill and intersects with Silver Lane, Hawley Lane and Route 8 in Trumbull. It then goes up and over Mischa Hill and into the center of the village of Nichols. It crosses over the Merritt Parkway and then defines the western boundary of the historic Nichols green and intersects with old cross highway Unity Road. Past Nichols center, it continues northward and intersects with Isinglass Road as it makes its way into the village of Huntington in Shelton. It bisects the historic Huntington green separating the common from the old St. Paul's Episcopal Church and old burial ground. Route 108 makes a turn eastward past the Huntington green on its way to its terminus at Route 110 in Downtown Shelton at the western side of the Housatonic River.

Route 108 is a two lane road that widens to four lanes with turning lanes and traffic lights at the intersections with Route 8 and Route 15 (Merritt Parkway) in Trumbull.

== History ==
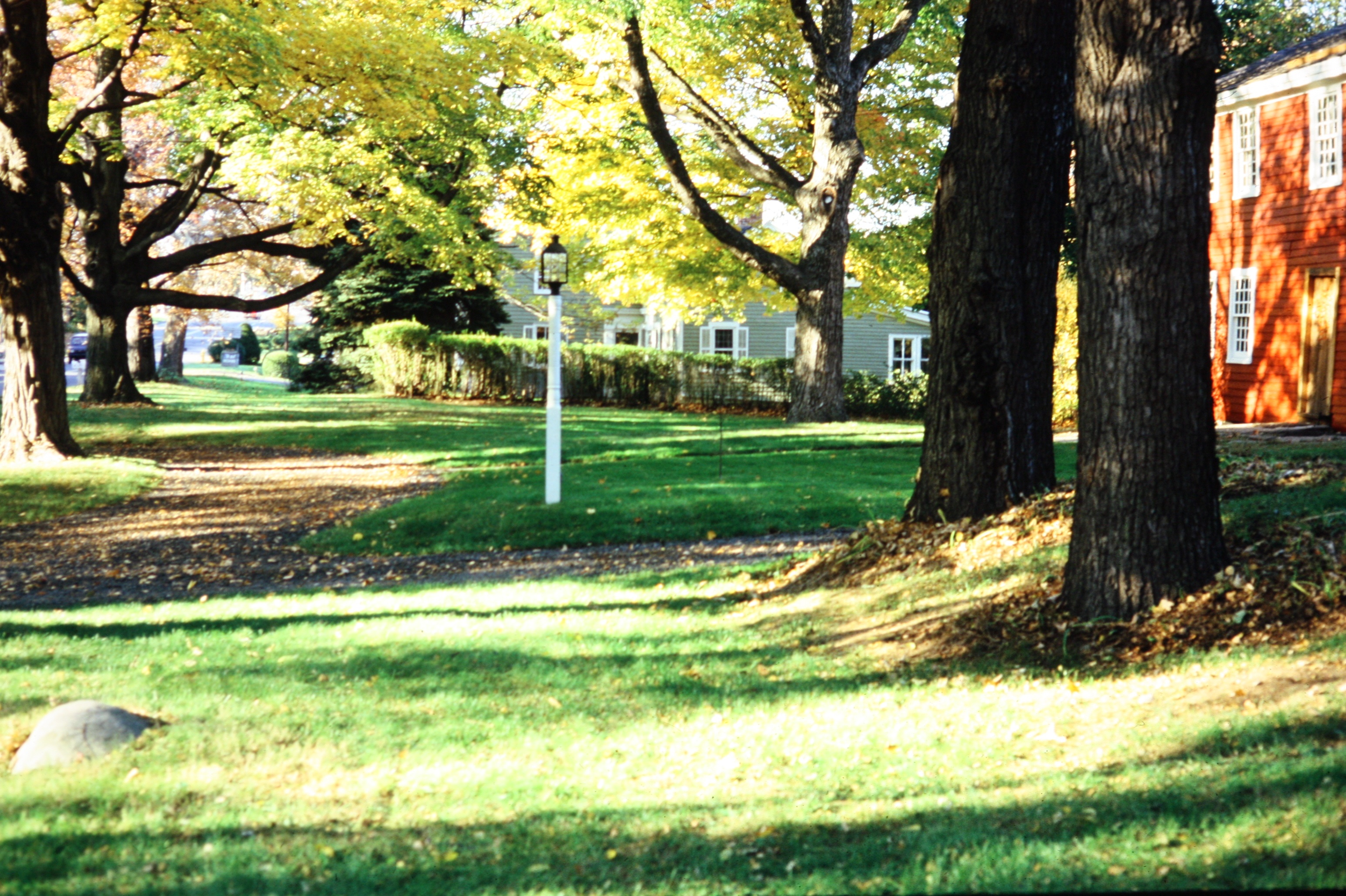
Remnant of Farm Highway at Nichols, Connecticut

- Originally called the Farm Highway, the portion of Route 108 in Trumbull, called Nichols Avenue, was laid out and designated as a highway on December 7, 1696, by the Stratford selectmen. The selectmen recorded into the land records that there is a highway presently running out of the north end of the town, called the farm highway, running northerly into the woods being laid out by the town as far as the brook that runs on the south end of Mischa Hill, the present day intersection of Route 108 and the Merritt Parkway in Trumbull. At the time, the highway was a full 12 rods, or 198 feet (60 m) wide at the south side of Mischa Hill, at Zachariah Curtiss, his land, and at Captain's Farm.
- The Stratford selectmen designed and built a rural highway system of main north–south highways one mile (1.6 km) apart and cross highways one mile (1.6 km) apart. The original north–south highways were Broadbridge Road, Nichols Avenue (now Route 108), Main Street (now Route 113) Huntington Road, Bear Swamp Road or present day Cutspring Road/East Main Street, and River Road (now Route 110). The cross highways were North Avenue, Second Hill Lane, Hawley and Silver Lanes, and Unity Road. On May 18, 1724, the Stratford selectmen voted to extend the highways six miles (9.7 km) north into the woods or ten miles (16 km) distant from the meeting house. They also voted to build cross highways at mile intervals creating a network of interconnecting highways and dividing the entire north end of the township.
- In October 1725, the General Assembly of the Connecticut Colony referred to the Farm Highway, in their approval of the new Parish of Unity, as Nichol's Farm's Road.
- The northern portion of current Route 108 was part of the Huntington Turnpike, a toll road built by the Huntington Turnpike Company, which was chartered in May 1828. The Huntington Turnpike went from Bridgeport, through the old town centers of Nichols and Huntington (now known as Shelton), to the west bank of the Housatonic River opposite Derby Landing (the current downtown area of Shelton). The company was dissolved in March 1886. The southern end of the Huntington Turnpike that did not become part of Route 108 is now an unsigned state road (SR) with designations SR 730 (East Main Street to Route 8) in Bridgeport and SR 711 (Route 8 to Route 108) in Trumbull.
- The modern Route 108 was designated in the 1932 state highway renumbering, but only between downtown Shelton (the current northern end) and the Huntington green with a length of about 3.4 miles (5.5 km). The designation was extended another 4.4 miles (7.1 km) in 1951 along the Huntington Turnpike to the village of Nichols, ending at then Route 113. It was again extended another 3.2 miles (5.1 km) as a result of the 1962 Route Reclassification Act along Nichols Avenue (former Route 113) to its current southern end at US 1 in Stratford. In 1999, a slight realignment was done in downtown Shelton, gaining an additional 0.1-mile (0.16 km).

== Junction list ==
The entire route is in Fairfield County.

| Location | mi | km | Destinations | Notes |
|---|---|---|---|---|
| Stratford | 0.00 | 0.00 | US 1 (Barnum Avenue) | Southern terminus; former Boston Post Road |
| Trumbull | 2.67 | 4.30 | Route 8 / Route 15 north / Merritt Parkway north – Waterbury, New Haven, Bridgeport | Exit 5 on Route 8; Exit 34 on Merritt Parkway south |
| Trumbull | 3.15 | 5.07 | Route 15 south / Merritt Parkway south – New York City | Exit 33 on Merritt Parkway north |
| Shelton | 10.99 | 17.69 | To Route 8 south | Access via SR 714 |
| Shelton | 11.05 | 17.78 | Route 110 (Howe Avenue) / Derby–Shelton Bridge (SR 712 east) to Route 8 north / Route 34 | Northern terminus |
1.000 mi = 1.609 km; 1.000 km = 0.621 mi

== On the National Register of Historic Places ==
- The Peet Fountain, is a water fountain donated by the Peet family and dedicated in 1895 for use by human, horse and other four-legged friends, is located on Route 108 at the intersection of Unity Road in the Nichols Farms Historic District. In 1995, during a renovation, the fountain was significantly altered from its original configuration when rabbits and cattails were added to its top basin.
- The Curtiss Memorial Fountain, another historic water fountain from the 1800s, was donated by the Curtiss family for public use is located on Route 108 at the northeast end of the historic Huntington green in the Huntington Center Historic District.

== See also ==
- Ephraim Hawley House
- Zachariah Curtiss House
