= Weatogue, Connecticut =

- Census-designated place
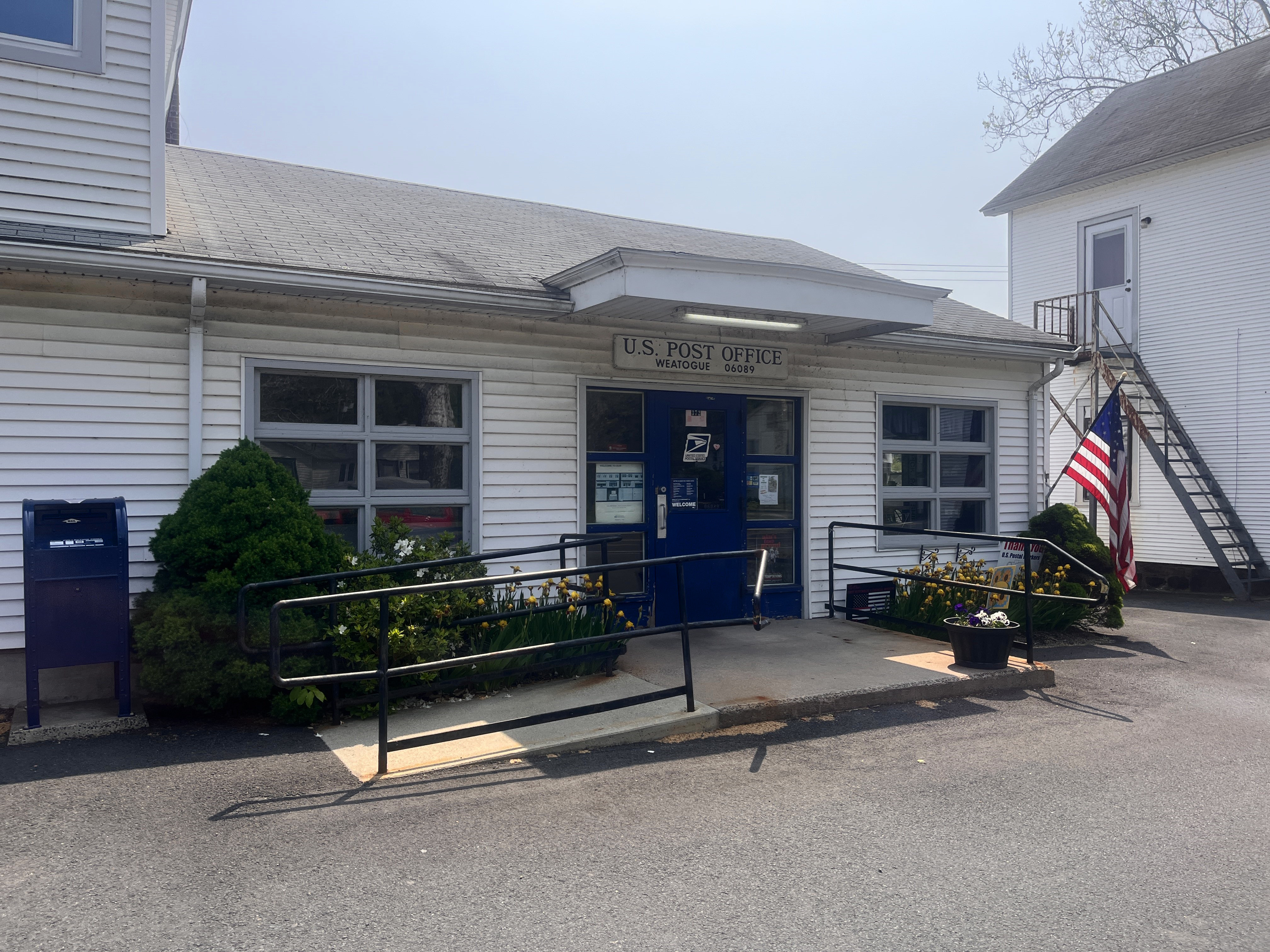
- Weatogue Post Office

- Location within Connecticut Location within the United States
- Coordinates: 41°50′37″N 72°49′42″W
- Country: United States
- State: Connecticut
- County: Hartford
- Town: Simsbury

Area
  - Total: 3.02 sq mi (7.81 km^{2})
  - Land: 3.00 sq mi (7.76 km^{2})
  - Water: 0.019 sq mi (0.05 km^{2})
- Elevation: 300 ft (91 m)

Population (2010)
  - Total: 2,776
  - Density: 926/sq mi (357.7/km^{2})
- Time zone: UTC-5 (Eastern)
  - Summer (DST): UTC-4 (Eastern)
- ZIP code: 06089
- Area code: 860
- FIPS code: 09-80770
- GNIS feature ID: 2377877

Weatogue (/ˈwitɔːɡ/ WEE-tawg) is a village and census-designated place in Simsbury, Connecticut, United States. As of the 2020 census, Weatogue had a population of 2,906.

== Geography ==
Weatogue is in the southern part of the town of Simsbury and is bordered to the northwest by West Simsbury and to the northeast by Simsbury Center. The northern border of the CDP follows Town Forest Road, Stratton Brook Road, a small portion of U.S. Route 202, and Second Brook to its mouth in the Farmington River. The eastern border of the CDP follows the river south (upstream) to Minister Brook. The southern border follows Minister Brook, US 202, and Old Meadow Plain Road, and the western border follows Pine Glen Road, Park Road, Orchard Lane, and Overlook Terrace to Connecticut Route 167, from which point the border strikes northwest to Town Forest Road at Nimrod Road. The original settlement of Weatogue is in the eastern part of the CDP, at the junction of US 202 (Hopmeadow Street) with Canal Street and Stratton Brook Road.

According to the United States Census Bureau, the CDP has a total area of 3.02 square miles (7.81 km^{2}), of which 3.00 square miles (7.76 km^{2}) is land and 0.019 square miles (0.05 km^{2}), or 0.66%, is water.

== Demographics ==
=== 2020 census ===
As of the 2020 census, Weatogue had a population of 2,906. The median age was 42.2 years. 22.7% of residents were under the age of 18 and 18.5% were 65 years of age or older. For every 100 females, there were 96.9 males, and for every 100 females age 18 and over, there were 91.8 males age 18 and over.

100.0% of residents lived in urban areas, while 0.0% lived in rural areas.

There were 1,104 households, of which 32.5% had children under the age of 18 living in them. Of all households, 66.6% were married-couple households, 10.6% were households with a male householder and no spouse or partner present, and 17.4% were households with a female householder and no spouse or partner present. About 16.1% of all households were made up of individuals, and 7.5% had someone living alone who was 65 years of age or older.

There were 1,143 housing units, of which 3.4% were vacant. The homeowner vacancy rate was 0.9% and the rental vacancy rate was 6.9%.

Racial composition as of the 2020 census
Race	Number	Percent
White	2,377	81.8%
Black or African American	37	1.3%
American Indian and Alaska Native	2	0.1%
Asian	213	7.3%
Native Hawaiian and Other Pacific Islander	0	0.0%
Some other race	60	2.1%
Two or more races	217	7.5%
Hispanic or Latino (of any race)	183	6.3%

=== 2000 census ===
As of the census of 2000, there were 2,805 people, 1,007 households, and 815 families residing in the CDP. The population density was 935.0 inhabitants per square mile (361.0/km^{2}). There were 1,031 housing units at an average density of 343.6 per square mile (132.7/km^{2}). The racial makeup of the CDP was 95.65% White, 0.75% African American, 0.04% Native American, 2.35% Asian, 0.04% Pacific Islander, 0.25% from other races, and 0.93% from two or more races. Hispanic or Latino of any race were 1.71% of the population.

There were 1,007 households, out of which 44.8% had children under the age of 18 living with them, 73.1% were married couples living together, 5.6% had a female householder with no husband present, and 19.0% were non-families. 16.1% of all households were made up of individuals, and 4.8% had someone living alone who was 65 years of age or older. The average household size was 2.79 and the average family size was 3.15.

In the CDP the population was spread out, with 30.3% under the age of 18, 3.5% from 18 to 24, 29.1% from 25 to 44, 26.8% from 45 to 64, and 10.3% who were 65 years of age or older. The median age was 39 years. For every 100 females, there were 96.8 males. For every 100 females age 18 and over, there were 91.2 males.

The median income for a household in the CDP was $88,654, and the median income for a family was $93,761. Males had a median income of $66,071 versus $46,635 for females. The per capita income for the CDP was $39,652. About 1.0% of families and 1.4% of the population were below the poverty line, including 2.3% of those under age 18 and 3.0% of those age 65 or over.
