= Connecticut Route 305 =

State highway in Hartford County, Connecticut, US

Route 305
- Map of Hartford County in northern Connecticut with Route 305 highlighted in red

Route information
- Maintained by CTDOT
- Length: 3.42 mi (5.50 km)
- Existed: 1963–present

Major junctions
- West end: Route 187 in Bloomfield
- I-91 in Windsor
- East end: Route 75 / Route 159 in Windsor

Location
- Country: United States
- State: Connecticut
- Counties: Hartford

Highway system
- Connecticut State Highway System; Interstate; US; State; SSR; SR; Scenic
← Route 302	→ Route 309

Route 305 is a Connecticut state highway in the northern Hartford suburbs, running from Bloomfield to Windsor.

== Route description ==
Route 305 begins at an intersection with Route 187 in northeastern Bloomfield and heads generally east towards the town of Windsor. It crosses the town line about a mile later and heads generally southeast. It crosses over Mill Brook and then has an interchange with I-91 (at Exit 37) about 1.4 miles (2.3 km) east of the town line. Route 305 continues east for another mile until it ends at an intersection with Route 75 in the town center of Windsor. Route 305 is known as Old Windsor Road in Bloomfield and as Bloomfield Avenue in Windsor.

== History ==
Prior to 1963, part of the route, from the Bloomfield line to Route 75, was an unsigned but state-maintained road known as SR 905 (which became a state road in 1959). Initially, the state had planned to turn over SR 905 to Windsor but when the final decisions for the 1962 Route Reclassification Act were announced, it was instead retained in the state highway system, with the continuation in Bloomfield also taken over by the state. At the beginning of 1963, SR 905 was renumbered as Route 305, officially becoming a signed route. Route 305 has had no significant changes since.

== Junction list ==
The entire route is in Hartford County.

Location	mi	km	Destinations	Notes
Bloomfield	0.00	0.00	Route 187 – Hartford, East Granby	Western terminus
Windsor	2.41	3.88	I-91 – Hartford, Springfield	Exit 44 on I-91
Windsor	3.42	5.50	Route 75 north / Route 159 – Windsor Center, Poquonock	Eastern terminus; southern terminus of Route 75
1.000 mi = 1.609 km; 1.000 km = 0.621 mi
