= U.S. Route 202 in Connecticut =

Highway in Connecticut

U.S. Route 202
- US 202 highlighted in red

Route information
- Maintained by CTDOT
- Length: 75.17 mi (120.97 km)
- Existed: 1935 (relocated 1974)–present

Major junctions
- West end: US 6 / US 202 at the New York state line in Danbury
- I-84 / US 7 in Danbury; I-84 / US 6 in Danbury; Route 4 / Route 8 in Torrington
- East end: US 202 / Route 10 at the Massachusetts state line in Granby

Location
- Country: United States
- State: Connecticut
- Counties: Fairfield, Litchfield, Hartford

Highway system
- United States Numbered Highway System; List; Special; Divided; Connecticut State Highway System; Interstate; US; State; SSR; SR; Scenic
← Route 201	→ Route 203

In Connecticut, U.S. Route 202 (US 202) is usually signed as an east–west route. It enters from the New York state line in Danbury overlapped with U.S. Route 6 and ends at the Massachusetts state line in Granby overlapped with Route 10. Although the route serves no major city centers for most of its run, with the largest city being Danbury, it does pass through Hartford County, serving the northern fringe of Greater Hartford. US 202 is overlapped with other routes for most of its length.

== Route description ==
US 202 enters Connecticut in the town of Danbury duplexed with US 6. The duplex joins another duplex, I-84 and US 7 at I-84 exit 4 to form a 3 mile four-way concurrency. US 7 and 202 split from I-84 and US 6 at exit 7. They remain duplexed on a freeway for a short stretch before 202 exits the freeway at the first exit (exit 11) at the Brookfield town line to follow Federal Road, a two-lane road that was an old alignment of US 7. The two roads reunite at the end of the US 7 freeway about 5.3 miles (8.5 km) later just before the New Milford town line. Between the junctions of US 7 at exit 12 and US 7 at the Brookfield-New Milford border, signage for US 202 briefly changes directions to become a north-south route through the center of Brookfield. US 202 returns to being signed in its dominant east-west directions again after overlapping with US 7 in New Milford. The 2 roads split again in the center of New Milford as US 202 turns east to cross the Housatonic River. It then turns northeast to pass through Washington and Morris (briefly), before entering Litchfield. Route 202 passes through the historic downtown district, where it intersects Route 63 and has a connection with Route 118 which heads toward the western suburbs of Hartford. It then enters Torrington, where it meets the Route 8 freeway at exit 50. Leaving Torrington, US 202 passes through New Hartford before entering Canton. Just after crossing the Farmington River in western Canton, US 202 starts a duplex with US 44 through Canton and the southwest corner of Simsbury into Avon. In the center of Avon, as US 44 leaves the duplex to the east, US 202 is joined from the east by Route 10, as both turn northward. US 202 (duplexed with Route 10) then reenters Simsbury, and then enters Granby. After a brief triplex with Route 189 in the center of town, the US 202/Route 10 duplex crosses the Massachusetts state line into the town of Southwick. At this point, US 202 officially changes from a signed east-west to a signed north-south route, although signage north of Avon shows both 202 and 10 (the latter correctly so) as signed north-south.

== History ==
US 202 was designated in 1935. It originally went along its modern alignment, continuing east on Lake Avenue and West Street to downtown Danbury, then went south along modern CT 53 and CT 302 into Newtown (this section was signed as CT 34 from 1932 to 1934.) 202 then overlapped with US 6 into Farmington, with CT 10 joining them to the Massachusetts state line. Modern US 202 in Litchfield County was originally part of CT 25 (New Milford to Torrington) and CT 4 (Torrington to Canton.) The portion between Danbury and New Milford was then just US 7. In 1963, CT 4 was shifted southward with CT 25 extended along modern US 202 to Canton. In 1974, US 202 was moved to its modern alignment. CT 25 was truncated to US 7 in Brookfield and the former alignment between Danbury and Newtown became CT 302 and a northern extension of CT 53.

== Junction list ==
County	Location	mi	km	Exit	Destinations	Notes
Fairfield	Danbury	0.00	0.00		US 6 west / US 202 west	Continuation into New York
Fairfield	Danbury	0.1	0.16		I-84 – Newburgh, Waterbury	Access via Saw Mill Road; exit 1 on I-84
Fairfield	Danbury	1.10	1.77		I-84 – Newburgh, Waterbury	Access via SR 824; exit 2B on I-84
Fairfield	Danbury	4.15	6.68	Western end of freeway section		
Fairfield	Danbury	4.15	6.68	4	I-84 / US 7 south / Lake Avenue – Newburgh, Waterbury, New Milford	Western end of I-84/US 7 concurrency; no westbound access via US 7 northbound; eastbound access only
Fairfield	Danbury	5.61	9.03	5	Route 37 north / Route 39 north / Route 53 south – Downtown Danbury, Bethel	Route 37 not signed westbound
Fairfield	Danbury	6.25	10.06	6	Route 37 – New Fairfield	Westbound exit and eastbound entrance
Fairfield	Danbury	7.43	11.96	7 (EB); 10 (WB)	I-84 east (US 6 east) – Waterbury	Eastern end of I-84/US 6 concurrency
Fairfield	Brookfield	8.59	13.82	11	US 7 north / White Turkey Road (SR 840 south) – New Milford	Eastern end of US 7 concurrency
Fairfield	Brookfield	8.59	13.82	Eastern end of freeway section		
Fairfield	Brookfield	9.04	14.55		Federal Road (SR 805 south)	
Fairfield	Brookfield	10.66	17.16		Route 133 north – Brookfield Center	Southern terminus of Route 133
Fairfield	Brookfield	11.94	19.22		US 7 – Danbury, New Milford	Exit 12 on US 7
Fairfield	Brookfield	12.68	20.41		Route 25 south – Brookfield Center, Newtown	Northern terminus of Route 25
Fairfield	Brookfield	13.88	22.34		US 7 south – Danbury	Western end of US 7 concurrency
Litchfield	New Milford	19.30	31.06		US 7 north – Kent Route 67 begins	Eastern end of US 7 concurrency; northern terminus of Route 67
Litchfield	New Milford			Veterans Memorial Bridge over Housatonic River		
Litchfield	New Milford	19.80	31.87		Route 67 south – Roxbury, Bridgewater, Southbury	Eastern end of Route 67 concurrency
Litchfield	New Milford	21.59	34.75		Route 109 east – Washington	Western terminus of Route 109
Litchfield	Washington	27.42	44.13		Route 45 north – New Preston, Warren	Southern terminus of Route 45
Litchfield	Washington	28.69	46.17		Route 47 south – Washington	Northern terminus of Route 47
Litchfield	Washington	31.29	50.36		Route 341 west – Warren, Kent	Eastern terminus of Route 341
Litchfield	Litchfield	35.14	56.55		Route 209 south – Morris, Bantam Lake	Northern terminus of Route 209
Litchfield	Litchfield	38.53	62.01		Route 63 – Goshen, East Morris	
Litchfield	Litchfield	38.62	62.15		Route 118 east – Harwinton	Western terminus of Route 118
Litchfield	Torrington	46.97	75.59		South Main Street (SR 800 south)	Western end of SR 800 concurrency
Litchfield	Torrington	44.02	70.84		Main Street (SR 800 north)	Eastern end of SR 800 concurrency
Litchfield	Torrington	44.70	71.94		Route 4 west / Route 8 – Waterbury, Winsted	Exit 50 on Route 8
Litchfield	Torrington	44.85	72.18		Route 4 west	Western end of Route 4 concurrency
Litchfield	Torrington	44.97	72.37		Route 4 east – Harwinton	Eastern end of Route 4 concurrency
Litchfield	Torrington	46.70	75.16		Route 183 – Harwinton, Winsted	
Litchfield	New Hartford	50.19	80.77		Route 219 north – New Hartford	Southern terminus of Route 219
Hartford	Canton	55.57	89.43		US 44 west / Route 179 – Farmington, Collinsville	US 44 not signed westbound
Hartford	Canton	55.73	89.69		US 44 west / Route 179 north – New Hartford, Winsted	Western end of US 44 concurrency; westbound exit and eastbound entrance
Hartford	Canton	57.49	92.52		Dowd Avenue (SR 565 west)	
Hartford	Canton	57.84	93.08		Route 177 south – Unionville	Northern terminus of Route 177
Hartford	Simsbury	59.06	95.05		Route 167 – Simsbury, Unionville	
Hartford	Avon	61.05	98.25		US 44 east / Route 10 south – West Hartford, Hartford, Farmington	Eastern end of US 44 concurrency; western end of Route 10 concurrency
Hartford	Simsbury	63.98	102.97		Route 185 east – Bloomfield	Western terminus of Route 185
Hartford	Simsbury	66.64	107.25		Route 167 south to Route 309 – West Simsbury, Canton	Northern terminus of Route 167
Hartford	Simsbury	67.60	108.79		Route 315 east – Tariffville	Western terminus of Route 315
Hartford	Granby	71.73	115.44		Route 189 south – Bloomfield	Southern end of Route 189 concurrency
Hartford	Granby	71.81	115.57		Route 20 / Route 189 north – North Granby, East Granby, Bradley International Airport	Northern end of Route 189 concurrency
Hartford	Granby	75.17	120.97		US 202 north / Route 10 north – Southwick Route 10 ends	Continuation into Massachusetts; northern terminus of Route 10
1.000 mi = 1.609 km; 1.000 km = 0.621 mi: Concurrency terminus; Incomplete access

== Special designations ==
In 2010, the Connecticut Department of Transportation designated the 3.8-mile (6.1 km) segment of US 202 between the junction with Route 45 and Rabbit Hill Road in New Preston a state scenic road.

U.S. Route 202
Previous state: New York	Connecticut	Next state: Massachusetts
