= Route 168 (Connecticut–Massachusetts) =

Highway in Connecticut and Massachusetts

Route 168
- Map of northern Connecticut with CT 168 highlighted in solid red and of southern Massachusetts with MA 168 highlighted in dotted red

Route information
- Maintained by ConnDOT and MassDOT
- Length: 9.17 mi (14.76 km) Connecticut: 7.93 mi Massachusetts: 1.24 mi
- Existed: 1975 (1932 as Route 190)–present

Major junctions
- West end: US 202 / Route 10 in Southwick, MA
- East end: Route 75 in Suffield, CT

Location
- Country: United States
- States: Connecticut, Massachusetts
- Counties: MA: Hampden, CT: Hartford

Highway system
- Connecticut State Highway System; Interstate; US; State; SSR; SR; Scenic
← Route 167	→ Route 169
← Route 159	MA	→ Route 169

Route 168 is a 9.17-mile-long (14.76 km) state route in the U.S. states of Massachusetts and Connecticut. The route connects the village of Congamond in the town of Southwick to the town center of Suffield. The route crosses over the Congamond Lake. In Massachusetts, the road is town-maintained except for the bridge approach, which is state-maintained.

== Route description ==
Route 168 begins at U.S. Route 202/Route 10 in Southwick, within the area known as the Congamond Notch (or Southwick Jog), site of a boundary dispute between Massachusetts and Connecticut. It crosses over Congamond Lake on a short bridge, at the east end of which it crosses the Connecticut state line into the town of Suffield. Route 168 continues east from the Congamond Lakes, passing by a highway picnic area, to Babbs Road (unsigned State Road 585), which is a road that leads directly to the town center of Southwick. From here, the road travels east, south, then east again, passing over a small mountain with several twists and turns. It then goes towards the village of West Suffield, where it has a junction with Route 187. Route 168 continues east for another 2.8 miles (4.5 km) until it ends at an intersection with Route 75 in Suffield center. The entire route is known as Congamond Road in Massachusetts and Mountain Road in Connecticut.

== History ==
Route 168 was originally part of the original alignment of Route 190 when that road was created as part of the 1932 state highway renumbering. In 1975, Interstate 190 was formally assigned to a proposed expressway in Worcester, Massachusetts, which created a numbering conflict with Route 190. When Massachusetts renumbered its Route 190 to Route 168, Connecticut also renumbered the western portion of its Route 190 (west of Suffield center) to maintain number continuity across the state line.

== Junction list ==
State	County	Location	mi	km	Destinations	Notes
Massachusetts	Hampden	Southwick	0.00	0.00	US 202 / Route 10 to Route 57 – Westfield, Granville, Granby	Western terminus
Connecticut–Massachusetts state line			1.24 0.00	2.00 0.00	Route transition	
Connecticut	Hartford	Suffield	1.06	1.71	Babbs Road (SR 585)	
Connecticut	Hartford	Suffield	5.16	8.30	Route 187 – Feeding Hills, East Granby	
Connecticut	Hartford	Suffield	7.93	12.76	Route 75 – Windsor Locks, Agawam	Eastern terminus
1.000 mi = 1.609 km; 1.000 km = 0.621 mi: Route transition
