= Connecticut Route 179 =

State highway in northern Connecticut, US

Route 179
- Map of northern Connecticut with Route 179 highlighted in red

Route information
- Maintained by CTDOT
- Length: 16.50 mi (26.55 km)
- Existed: 1932–present

Major junctions
- South end: Route 4 in Burlington
- North end: Route 20 in Hartland

Location
- Country: United States
- State: Connecticut
- Counties: Hartford, Litchfield

Highway system
- Connecticut State Highway System; Interstate; US; State; SSR; SR; Scenic
← Route 178	→ Route 181

Route 179 is a state highway in northern Connecticut, running from Burlington to Hartland.

== Route description ==
Route 179 begins at an intersection with Route 4 in eastern Burlington and heads north along the Farmington River into Canton. After crossing the Farmington River in Collinsville, it follows the Farmington River before intersecting with both US 202 and US 44 just west of the western end of the US 44/202 overlap. It continues north along Cherry Brook passing through Canton Center and meeting the western end of Route 309 before curving northwest in North Canton and entering Barkhamsted. In Barkhamsted, it heads northwest, then turns north, briefly overlapping Route 219 and continuing into Hartland. In Hartland, it continues north, to end at an intersection with Route 20 in East Hartland.

A section of Route 179 in Canton from the Burlington town line to SR 565 is designated a scenic road.

== History ==
Route 179 was commissioned in 1932, running from US 44 in New Hartford to Route 20 in Hartland, along a route that is now generally but not completely assigned to Route 219. The original route used modern Route 219 from New Hartford center to the junction with modern Route 179, then Route 179 north to Hartland center. In 1944, Route 179 was relocated to its current route towards Canton Center, ending at its current intersection with US 44. Route 179 was also extended north to the Massachusetts state line at the same time. In 1963, with a realignment of Route 4, the former section of Route 4 from Canton to Burlington was reassigned to Route 179, ending at the current southern terminus. In 1979, the section north of Route 20 was redesignated as SR 819.

== Junction list ==
County	Location	mi	km	Destinations	Notes
Hartford	Burlington	0.00	0.00	Route 4 – Unionville, Burlington	Southern terminus
Hartford	Canton	2.44	3.93	Maple Avenue (SR 565 east)	
Hartford	Canton	3.86	6.21	US 44 east / US 202 – Torrington, Avon	US 44 not signed southbound
Hartford	Canton	4.01	6.45	US 44 / US 202 east – New Hartford, Avon	US 44 not signed northbound
Hartford	Canton	8.77	14.11	Route 309 east – Simsbury	Western terminus of Route 309
Litchfield	Barkhamsted	12.06	19.41	Route 219 south – New Hartford	Southern end of Route 219 concurrency
Litchfield	Barkhamsted	12.12	19.51	Route 219 north – West Granby	Northern end of Route 219 concurrency
Hartford	Hartland	16.50	26.55	Route 20 / Granville Road (SR 819 north) – Riverton, Granby	Northern terminus
1.000 mi = 1.609 km; 1.000 km = 0.621 mi: Concurrency terminus
