= Simsbury Center, Connecticut =

Census-designated place in Connecticut, United States

- Census-designated place
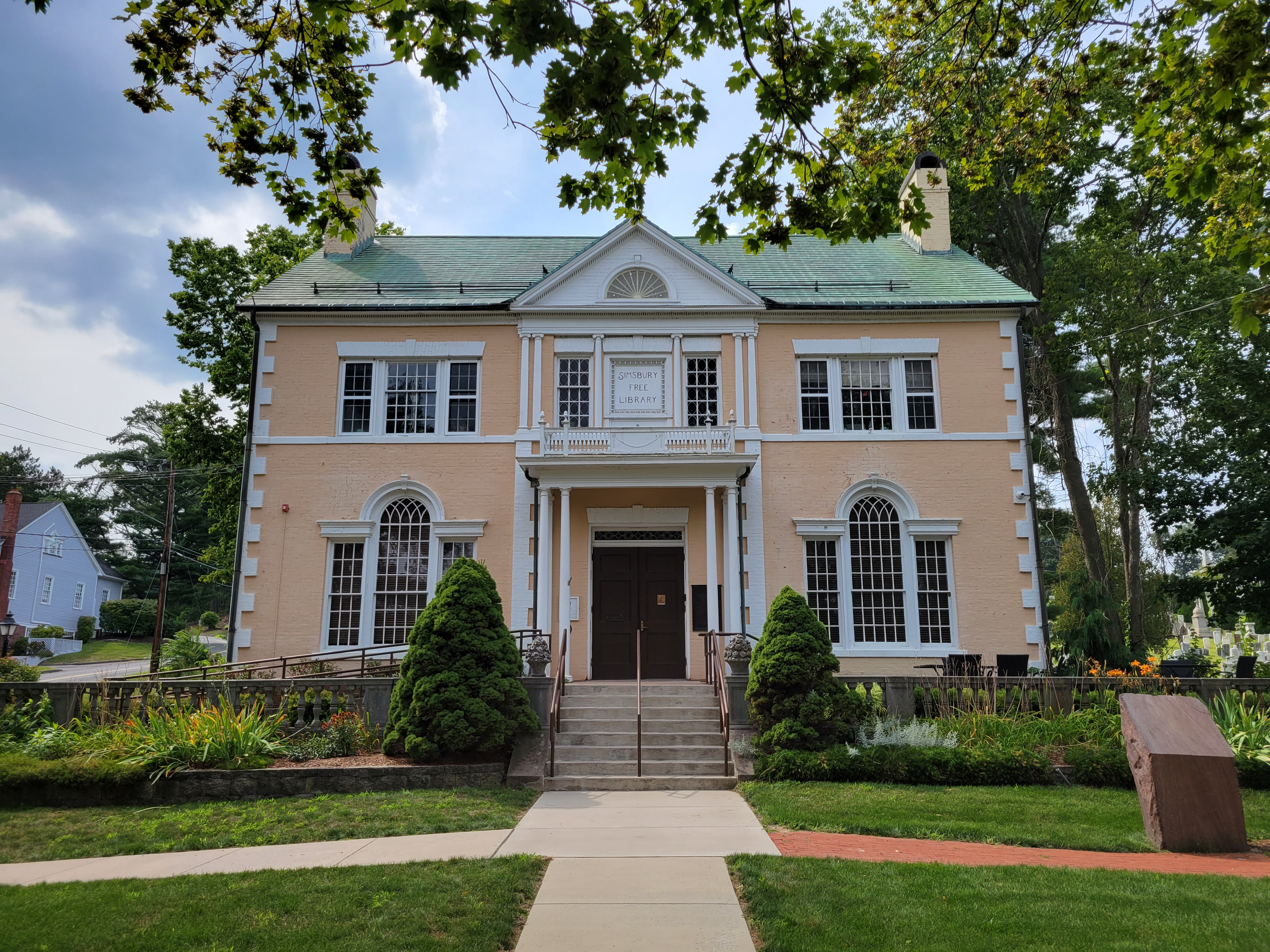
- Simsbury Free Library

- Location within Connecticut Location within the United States
- Coordinates: 41°52′13″N 72°48′16″W
- Country: United States
- State: Connecticut
- County: Hartford
- Town: Simsbury

Area
  - Total: 4.6 sq mi (11.8 km^{2})
  - Land: 4.6 sq mi (11.8 km^{2})
  - Water: 0 sq mi (0 km^{2})
- Elevation: 185 ft (56 m)

Population (2020)
  - Total: 6,268
  - Density: 1,380/sq mi (531/km^{2})
- Time zone: UTC-5 (Eastern)
  - Summer (DST): UTC-4 (Eastern)
- ZIP code: 06070 (Simsbury)
- Area code: 860
- FIPS code: 09-69010
- GNIS feature ID: 2377861

Simsbury Center is a census-designated place (CDP) that consists of the central settlement, and the neighborhoods immediately surrounding it, in the town of Simsbury, Connecticut, United States. As of the 2020 census, Simsbury Center had a population of 6,268. The core area of the CDP is listed as the Simsbury Center Historic District on the National Register of Historic Places.

== Geography ==
The Simsbury Center CDP is bordered to the north by Hoskins Road, to the east by the former route of the New York, New Haven and Hartford Railroad, now partially replaced by a bike trail, to the south by Stratton Brook Road, and to the west by Bushy Hill Road, Hop Brook, Grimes Brook, Great Pond Road, and Laurel Lane. The CDP is bordered to the west by West Simsbury and to the south by Weatogue. The Farmington River flows northward just east of the CDP.

The main road through the community is the combined U.S. Route 202/Connecticut Route 10, which leads north to Granby and south to Avon. Connecticut Route 309 (West Street) leads west from Simsbury Center through West Simsbury to North Canton. Connecticut Route 167 (Bushy Hill Road) branches off Route 309 and leads southwest to Crowleys Corner at the border between Simsbury and Avon. Simsbury Center is 11 miles (18 km) northwest of Hartford and 23 miles (37 km) southwest of Springfield, Massachusetts.

According to the United States Census Bureau, the CDP has a total area of 4.6 square miles (11.8 km^{2}), of which 0.0039 square miles (0.01 km^{2}), or 0.10%, are water.

== Demographics ==
=== 2020 census ===
As of the 2020 census, Simsbury Center had a population of 6,268. The median age was 45.6 years. 21.2% of residents were under the age of 18 and 21.1% of residents were 65 years of age or older. For every 100 females there were 89.7 males, and for every 100 females age 18 and over there were 87.2 males age 18 and over.

100.0% of residents lived in urban areas, while 0.0% lived in rural areas.

There were 2,660 households in Simsbury Center, of which 29.6% had children under the age of 18 living in them. Of all households, 54.3% were married-couple households, 13.3% were households with a male householder and no spouse or partner present, and 27.7% were households with a female householder and no spouse or partner present. About 29.7% of all households were made up of individuals and 16.1% had someone living alone who was 65 years of age or older.

There were 2,810 housing units, of which 5.3% were vacant. The homeowner vacancy rate was 1.8% and the rental vacancy rate was 5.8%.

Racial composition as of the 2020 census
Race	Number	Percent
White	5,318	84.8%
Black or African American	105	1.7%
American Indian and Alaska Native	12	0.2%
Asian	342	5.5%
Native Hawaiian and Other Pacific Islander	1	0.0%
Some other race	88	1.4%
Two or more races	402	6.4%
Hispanic or Latino (of any race)	347	5.5%

=== 2000 census ===
As of the census of 2000, there were 5,603 people, 2,216 households, and 1,582 families residing in the CDP. The population density was 1,246.1 inhabitants per square mile (481.1/km^{2}). There were 2,285 housing units at an average density of 508.2 per square mile (196.2/km^{2}). The racial makeup of the CDP was 95.98% White, 0.55% African American, 0.07% Native American, 2.18% Asian, 0.02% Pacific Islander, 0.25% from other races, and 0.95% from two or more races. Hispanic or Latino of any race were 1.55% of the population.

There were 2,216 households, out of which 36.7% had children under the age of 18 living with them, 62.5% were married couples living together, 7.0% had a female householder with no husband present, and 28.6% were non-families. 24.8% of all households were made up of individuals, and 10.4% had someone living alone who was 65 years of age or older. The average household size was 2.50 and the average family size was 3.02.

In the CDP, the population was spread out, with 27.3% under the age of 18, 3.7% from 18 to 24, 28.6% from 25 to 44, 25.7% from 45 to 64, and 14.6% who were 65 years of age or older. The median age was 40 years. For every 100 females, there were 91.5 males. For every 100 females age 18 and over, there were 84.2 males.

The median income for a household in the CDP was $72,639, and the median income for a family was $81,933. Males had a median income of $65,116 versus $41,250 for females. The per capita income for the CDP was $34,837. About 0.4% of families and 1.9% of the population were below the poverty line, including 0.6% of those under age 18 and 4.8% of those age 65 or over.
