= Connecticut Route 203 =

State highway in Windham County, Connecticut, US

Route 203
- Map of Windham County in northeastern Connecticut with Route 203 highlighted in red

Route information
- Maintained by CTDOT
- Length: 5.32 mi (8.56 km)
- Existed: 1932–present

Major junctions
- South end: Route 32 in Windham
- North end: US 6 in Windham

Location
- Country: United States
- State: Connecticut
- Counties: Windham

Highway system
- Connecticut State Highway System; Interstate; US; State; SSR; SR; Scenic
← US 202	→ Route 205

Route 203 is a state highway in eastern Connecticut, running entirely within the town of Windham.

== Route description ==
Route 203 begins as Windham Center Road at an intersection with Route 32 in the South Windham section of the town of Windham. The route heads northeast to cross the Shetucket River, then turns north heading towards Windham center. It intersects Route 14 in Windham center about 1.4 miles (2.3 km) from the river crossing. In Windham center, it joins Route 14 along North Road for about 0.8 miles (1.3 km). Route 203 then splits off from Route 14, which continues towards Willimantic. Route 203, now known as North Windham Road, travels generally north for another 1.8 miles (2.9 km) until its end at an intersection with US 6 in the North Windham section of town. It intersects the Air Line Trail 0.2 miles (0.32 km) from US 6.

The section of Route 203 from Route 32 to Route 14 is designated a scenic road.

== History ==
The southern half of modern Route 203 (from Route 32 to the north junction with Route 14) was part of the Windham and Mansfield Turnpike, which was chartered in 1800. In 1922, when Connecticut first assigned route numbers to its main roads, the road from South Windham to North Windham was designated as 'State Highway 222'. In the 1932 state highway renumbering, old Highway 222 was renumbered to Route 203. A reconfiguration of US 6 in North Windham in 1954 resulted in Route 203 ending beyond US 6 at the old US 6 alignment (which was now unsigned SR 682) for several years. This was rectified in 1962 when SR 682 was deleted and Route 203 cut back to end at current US 6.

== Junction list ==
The entire route is in Windham, Windham County.

mi	km	Destinations	Notes
0.00	0.00	Route 32	Southern terminus
1.70	2.74	Route 14 east – Scotland, Canterbury	Southern end of Route 14 concurrency
2.52	4.06	Route 14 west – Willimantic	Northern end of Route 14 concurrency
5.32	8.56	US 6 – Willimantic, Chaplin, Danielson	Northern terminus
1.000 mi = 1.609 km; 1.000 km = 0.621 mi
