= Connecticut Route 318 =

State highway in Litchfield County, Connecticut, US

Route 318
- Map of Litchfield County in northwestern Connecticut with Route 318 highlighted in red

Route information
- Maintained by CTDOT
- Length: 3.14 mi (5.05 km)
- Existed: 1963–present

Major junctions
- West end: US 44 in Barkhamsted
- East end: Route 219 in Barkhamsted

Location
- Country: United States
- State: Connecticut
- Counties: Litchfield

Highway system
- Connecticut State Highway System; Interstate; US; State; SSR; SR; Scenic
| ← Route 317 | → Route 319 |

Route 318 is a state highway in northern Connecticut running entirely in Barkhkamsted.

== Description ==
Route 318 begins at an intersection with US 44 in Barkhamsted and heads east-northeast. It overlaps Route 181, heading east, to cross the West Branch Farmington River, then continues east over the Saville Dam past Lake McDonough, ending at a "Y" intersection with Route 219.

The section of Route 318 from Route 181 to Route 219 is designated a scenic road.

== History ==
Route 318 was commissioned from SR 860 (Ripley Hill Road) and SR 418 (Saville Dam Road) in 1963 and has had no significant changes since. SR 418 was first designated as a state road in 1937 from Route 181 to the Saville Dam. This was extended across the dam two years later. SR 860 was taken over by the state in 1957.

== Junction list ==
The entire route is in Barkhamsted, Litchfield County.

| mi | km | Destinations | Notes |
|---|---|---|---|
| 0.00 | 0.00 | US 44 – New Hartford, Winsted, Hartford | Western terminus |
| 0.73 | 1.17 | Route 181 south – New Hartford | Western end of Route 181 concurrency |
| | | East River Road (SSR 482 north) | |
| 1.47 | 2.37 | Route 181 north – West Hartland | Eastern end of Route 181 concurrency |
| 3.14 | 5.05 | Route 219 – New Hartford, East Hartland, Bradley International Airport | Eastern terminus |
1.000 mi = 1.609 km; 1.000 km = 0.621 mi: Concurrency terminus
