= Warren Church =

Warren Church may refer to:

Churches

- Warren Congregational Church, Warren, Connecticut, listed on the National Register of Historic Places (NRHP)
- Warren First Congregational Church-Federated Church, Warren, Massachusetts, NRHP-listed
- Warren United Methodist Church and Parsonage, Warren, Rhode Island, NRHP-listed

Person

- Warren Church (politician)
