= Bradley Airport Connector =

Highway in Connecticut

- Bradley Airport Connector highlighted in red

Route information
- Length: 4.59 mi (7.39 km)
- Component highways: Route 20 from Windsor Locks to East Granby; SSR 401 (unsigned) from East Granby to Windsor Locks

Major junctions
- South end: I-91 in Windsor Locks
- Route 75 in Windsor Locks; Route 20 in East Granby
- North end: Bradley International Airport in Windsor Locks

Location
- Country: United States
- State: Connecticut
- Counties: Hartford

Highway system
- Connecticut State Highway System; Interstate; US; State; SSR; SR; Scenic

The Bradley Airport Connector (also the Bradley Field Connector) is a 4.6-mile (7.4 km) freeway built to connect Bradley International Airport to Interstate 91 (I-91) in Windsor Locks, Connecticut. It begins at Exit 48 of I-91 and heads west following Route 20 for about 4 miles along the town line between Windsor and Windsor Locks. The expressway then turns north, leaving Route 20 and briefly becoming an unsigned state road (with designation Special Service Road 401) ending at the airport terminals.

On October 10, 1999, the Connector was named the "82nd Airborne Memorial Highway", in honor of the U.S. Army's 82nd Airborne Division. According to the Connecticut Department of Transportation, the freeway carries as many as 54,900 vehicles per day (as of 2007).

== Route description ==
The highway begins at Exit 40 of I-91 in the town of Windsor Locks. After traveling about a quarter of a mile along the exit ramp, the main roadway starts as a four-lane freeway with unnumbered exits. The highway's first exit is with Old County Road a mile later. The second exit is signed for Route 75, which provides access to the long-term parking lots of the airport and leads to the town of Suffield. After about 0.6 miles (0.97 km), the highway has another exit for Hamilton Road. Soon after this exit, the highway enters East Granby, and Route 20 exits at the highway's fourth exit to continue west on surface roads. At this point, the expressway turns north to reenter Windsor Locks and soon enters the perimeter of Bradley International Airport. After a partial interchange with Hamilton Road North, the highway ends at Schoephoester Road, a one-way road that connects to the terminal access road.

The highway designation becomes Special Service Road 401 (SSR 401) after Route 20 leaves the Connector. The SSR 401 designation continues east on Schoephoester Road, which continues for another 1.2 miles (1.9 km) as a four-lane surface road to connect with Route 75. Schoephoester Road also provides access to the Bradley Airport parking lots. The airport terminal access road connects to Schoephoester Road about half a mile east of the end of the expressway at a jughandle intersection. The airport terminal access road is a one-way, unsigned state road with designation Special Service Road 403 (SSR 403).

== History ==
The project to build this connector was proposed in the early 1950s, but was not started until 1958. Three years later, on July 3, 1961, the four-lane expressway was open to traffic. The highway cost $3.9 million to construct. When the Connector opened to traffic, Route 20 was relocated to use the east–west portion of the highway. This resulted in Route 20 being truncated to end at I-91. The portion of the highway that is not part of Route 20 was assigned as SSR 401 in 1963.

== Exit list ==
The entire route is in Hartford County. All exits are unnumbered.

Location	mi	km	Destinations	Notes
Windsor Locks	0.00	0.00	I-91 – Hartford, Springfield Route 20 begins	Southern terminus; eastern terminus of Route 20; exit 40 on I-91
Windsor Locks	1.24	2.00	Old County Road / Kennedy Road	
Windsor Locks	2.55	4.10	Route 75 – Poquonock, Suffield	
Windsor Locks	3.13	5.04	Hamilton Road South	
East Granby–Windsor Locks– Windsor tripoint	3.85	6.20	Route 20 west – East Granby, Granby; SSR 401 begins	Northern end of Route 20 concurrency; western terminus of SSR 401
Windsor Locks–Windsor line	4.59	7.39	Transition between Bradley Airport Connector and Schoephoester Road	
Windsor Locks–Windsor line	4.93	7.93	Hamilton Road North	Former northbound exit and southbound entrance; permanently closed for highway realignment
Windsor Locks–Windsor line	5.34	8.59	Bradley International Airport	Jughandle; access via SSR 403
Windsor Locks–Windsor line	6.05	9.74	Route 75 (Ella Grasso Turnpike); SSR 401 ends	Northern terminus; eastern terminus of SSR 401
1.000 mi = 1.609 km; 1.000 km = 0.621 mi: Closed/former; Concurrency terminus; Route transition
