= Connecticut Route 167 =

State highway in Hartford County, Connecticut, US

Route 167
- Map of Hartford County in northern Connecticut with Route 167 highlighted in red

Route information
- Maintained by CTDOT
- Length: 10.41 mi (16.75 km)
- Existed: 1932–present

Major junctions
- South end: Route 4 in Farmington
- North end: US 202 / Route 10 in Simsbury

Location
- Country: United States
- State: Connecticut
- Counties: Hartford

Highway system
- Connecticut State Highway System; Interstate; US; State; SSR; SR; Scenic
← Route 166	→ Route 168

Route 167 is a Connecticut state highway in the western suburbs of Hartford, running from the Unionville section of Farmington to Simsbury center.

== Route description ==
Route 167 begins as West Avon Road at an intersection with Route 4 in the Unionville section of the town of Farmington. It proceeds in a northeast direction, crossing into the town of Avon after 0.7 miles (1.1 km). In Avon, it continues north through the West Avon section of town for about 3.4 miles (5.5 km), passing Avon High School, Avon Middle School, Pooh's Corner, and the former site of a Lum's Hot Dog before entering the town of Simsbury. The road name changes to Bushy Hill Road after crossing the town line, where it also has a junction with US 44 and US 202. Route 167 continues generally northeast for 4.8 miles (7.7 km), then meets Route 309 (leading to West Simsbury village). Here, Route 167 turns east onto West Street and continues for another 0.7 miles (1.1 km) before ending at an intersection with US 202 and Route 10 in Simsbury Center.

A section of Route 167 from Harris Road in Avon to the Simsbury-Avon town line is designated the First Company Governor's Horse Guards Memorial Highway.

== History ==
Route 167 was established as part of the 1932 state highway renumbering from previously unnumbered roads and has no major changes since.

== Junction list ==
The entire route is in Hartford County.

Location	mi	km	Destinations	Notes
Farmington	0.00	0.00	Route 4 – West Hartford, Burlington	Southern terminus
Simsbury	4.96	7.98	US 44 / US 202 – Canton, Avon	
Simsbury	9.73	15.66	Route 309 west – North Canton	Eastern terminus of Route 309
Simsbury	10.41	16.75	US 202 / Route 10 – Avon, Granby	Northern terminus
1.000 mi = 1.609 km; 1.000 km = 0.621 mi
