= Connecticut Route 341 =

State highway in Litchfield County, Connecticut, US

Route 341

- Map of Litchfield County in northwestern Connecticut with Route 341 highlighted in red

Route information
- Maintained by CTDOT
- Length: 15.97 mi (25.70 km)
- Existed: 1932–present

Major junctions
- West end: CR 3 at the New York state line in Kent
- US 7 in Kent
- East end: US 202 in Washington

Location
- Country: United States
- State: Connecticut
- Counties: Litchfield

Highway system
- Connecticut State Highway System; Interstate; US; State; SSR; SR; Scenic
← Route 337	→ Route 343

Route 341 is a state highway in western Connecticut, running from the New York state line in Kent to Washington.

== Route description ==
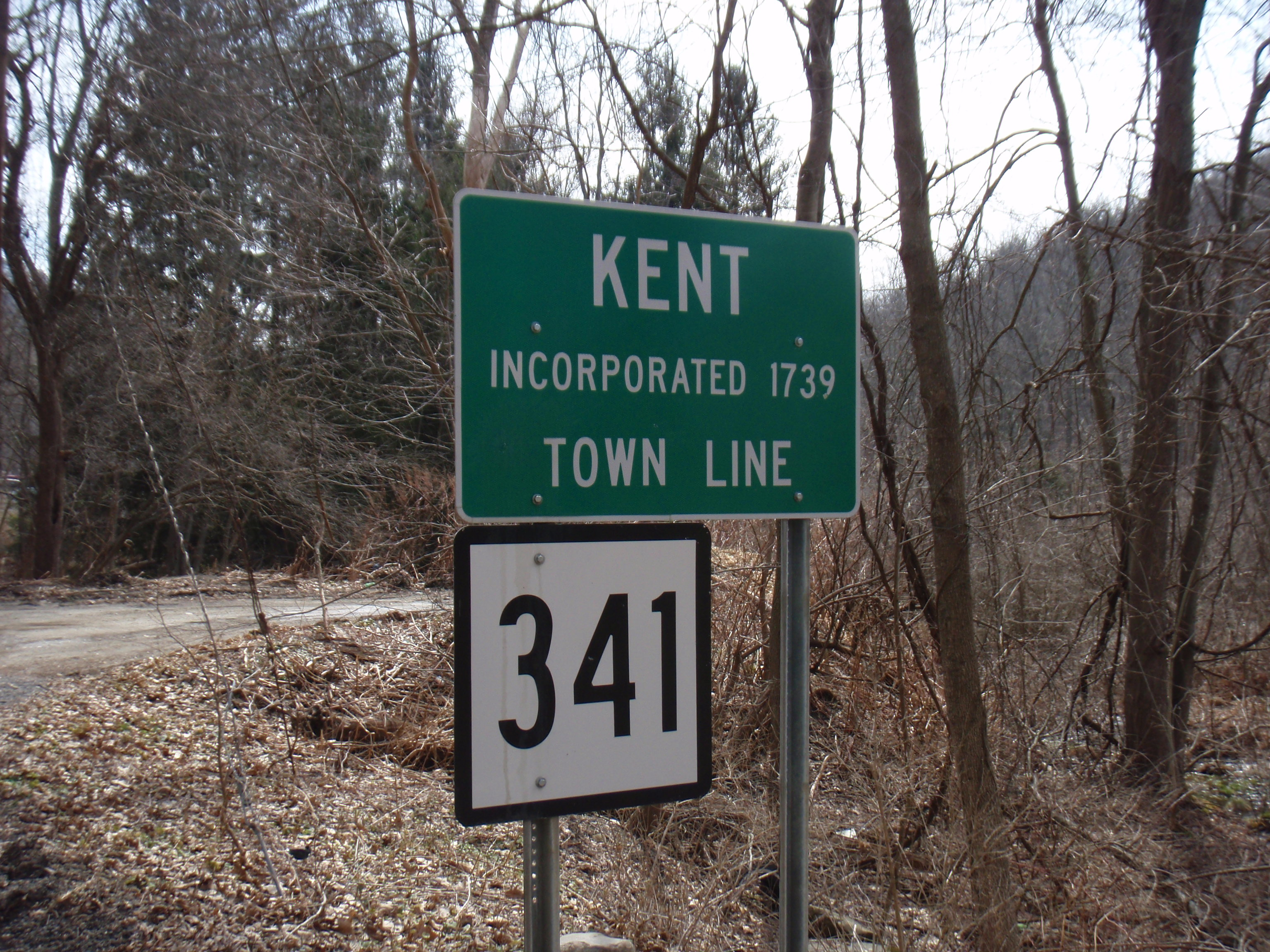
Route 341 heading into the town of Kent

Route 341 begins as a continuation of Dutchess County Route 3 at the New York state line in Kent and heads southeast along Bog Hollow Brook and Macedonia Brook. It crosses the Housatonic River and continues southeast, then turns east and northeast across the town into Warren. In Warren, it continues generally east to the center of town, then turns south for a long overlap with Route 45. After leaving Route 45, it turns southeast to the southeast corner of Warren and crosses into Washington. In Washington, it turns south to end at an intersection with U.S. Route 202 (US 202) by the Shepaug River in the Woodville section of town.

== History ==
Prior to 1932, the section west of US 7 was known as State Highway 127 and the section east of Route 45 was known as State Highway 299. Modern Route 341 was established as part of the 1932 state highway renumbering. Route 341 in Connecticut has had no significant changes since its designation.

== Major intersections ==
The entire route is in Litchfield County.

Location	mi	km	Destinations	Notes
Kent	0.00	0.00	CR 3 north	Continuation into New York
Kent	2.80	4.51	US 7 – New Milford, Cornwall	
Kent	3.41	5.49	South Kent Road (SR 827 south)	
Warren	11.23	18.07	Route 45 north – Cornwall	Western end of Route 45 concurrency
Warren	12.89	20.74	Route 45 south – New Preston	Eastern end of Route 45 concurrency
Washington	15.97	25.70	US 202 – New Milford, Bantam, Litchfield, Mount Tom State Park	Eastern terminus
1.000 mi = 1.609 km; 1.000 km = 0.621 mi: Concurrency terminus
