= Connecticut Route 20 =

State highway in Connecticut, US

Route 20
- Bradley Airport Connector

Route information
- Maintained by CTDOT
- Length: 31.56 mi (50.79 km)
- Existed: Main route: 1932; Connector: 1961–present

Major junctions
- West end: Route 8 in Winchester
- East end: I-91 in Windsor Locks

Location
- Country: United States
- State: Connecticut
- Counties: Litchfield, Hartford

Highway system
- Connecticut State Highway System; Interstate; US; State; SSR; SR; Scenic
← Route 19	→ Route 21

Route 20 is a 31.56-mile (50.79 km) state highway in the U.S. state of Connecticut. It extends from Route 8 in rural Winchester to Interstate 91 (I-91) in Windsor Locks. Route 20 consists of two distinct sections: a long, winding, scenic rural road, and a section of the freeway linking I-91 to Bradley International Airport.

== Route description ==
Route 20 begins at an intersection with Route 8 in Winchester and heads northeastward to Barkhamsted. It then cuts across the northwest corner of Barkhamsted to Hartland. In Hartland, Route 20 continues northeastward to meet Route 181, then turns north to curve around the Barkhamsted Reservoir. East of the reservoir, it turns southeast to meet Route 179 and continues into Granby. In Granby, Route 20 continues southeastward to meet Route 219, then turns eastward to briefly overlap Route 189 and cross US 202/Route 10 before leaving Route 189 and continuing into East Granby.

In East Granby, Route 20 continues eastward to meet Route 187, then turns southeastward along the boundary of Bradley International Airport to meet the Bradley Airport Connector. At this point, Route 20 joins the Bradley Airport Connector freeway. It continues southeastward through Windsor Locks, intersecting with Route 75 before ending at an intersection with I-91 at the southern tip of Windsor Locks.

The portion of Route 20 within East Granby is known as the Connecticut Air National Guard Memorial Highway. The Bradley Airport Connector is also known as the 82nd Airborne Memorial Highway.

== History ==
In 1922, the alignment of modern Route 20 was designated as two separate state highways: Highway 133 from Route 8 in Colebrook to Route 10 in Granby, and Highway 343 from Route 187 in East Granby to Route 159 in Windsor Locks. In the 1932 state highway renumbering, Route 20 was established as a single route incorporating old Highways 133 and 343, with an additional extension east of the Connecticut River along old Highway 105 (modern Route 190) to Stafford Springs (ending at what was then Route 15). Route 20 crossed the Connecticut River on Bridge Street and overlapped US 5 into Thompsonville.

The Barkhamsted Reservoir was filled in the 1940s causing Route 20 to be relocated to go around the north end of the reservoir. Route 20 was also shifted southward near Windsor Locks around the same time to make way for an air base, which is now Bradley International Airport. The relocation of Route 15 in 1948 to the new Wilbur Cross Highway (then a four lane surface road) also resulted in an eastward extension of Route 20 to end at the new highway.

The Bradley Airport Connector, an expressway connecting the airport to I-91, was constructed and opened to traffic in 1961. When the new expressway opened, Route 20 was relocated to use most of the Connector and was truncated to end at I-91. Route 140 was extended west across the Connecticut River to use the former Route 20 alignment in Windsor Locks and Route 190 was extended east to use the former alignment between Enfield and Union.

=== Expansion of Route 20 ===
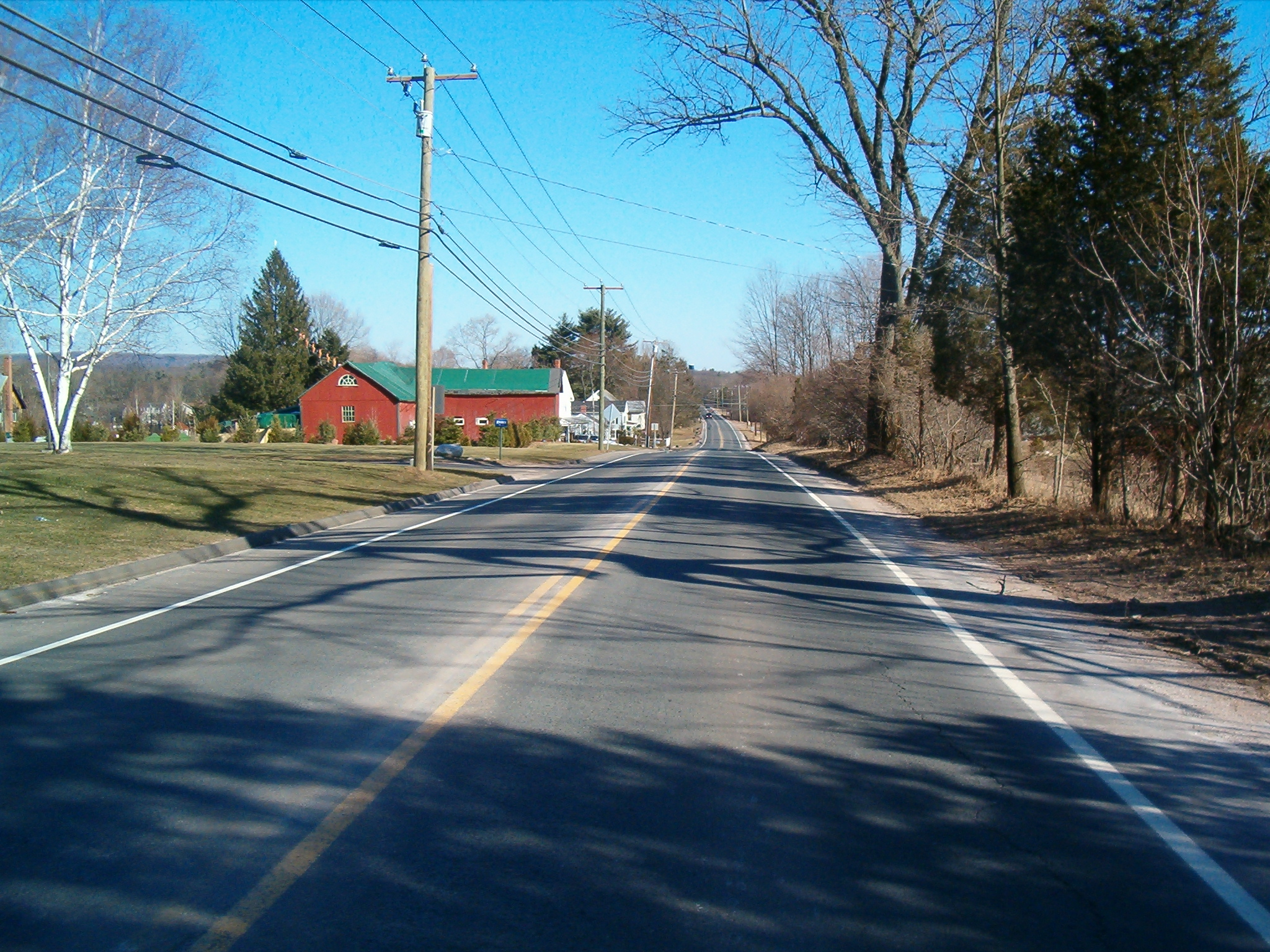
This image portrays the country and scenic views of Route 20 in Granby, Connecticut.

Since the 1960s, it was suggested that the connector be elongated to serve other northern Connecticut towns. The highway would extend westward to US 44 in Barkhamsted and run eastward over I-91 and along Route 190 to I-84. This proposal never went anywhere. Another similar proposal was made in 1967. This one stated that the expressway would run west into Granby center and east to I-84. This proposal also never followed through.

== Junction list ==
County	Location	mi	km	Destinations	Notes
Litchfield	Winchester	0.00	0.00	Route 8 – Winsted, Colebrook	Western terminus
Litchfield	Barkhamsted	2.32	3.73	East River Road (SSR 482 south)	
Hartford	Hartland	5.80	9.33	Route 181 south – Barkhamsted	Northern terminus of Route 181
Hartford	Hartland	14.42	23.21	Route 179 south / Granville Road (SR 819 north) – Barkhamsted	Northern terminus of Route 179
Hartford	Hartland	14.89	23.96	Mountain Road (SR 539 east)	
Hartford	Granby	18.47	29.72	Route 219 south – Barkhamsted	Northern terminus of Route 219
Hartford	Granby	21.87	35.20	Route 189 north – North Granby	Western end of Route 189 concurrency
Hartford	Granby	22.13	35.61	US 202 / Route 10 / Route 189 south – Simsbury, Southwick, MA, Tariffville	Eastern end of Route 189 concurrency
Hartford	East Granby	25.58	41.17	Route 187 – Suffield, Tariffville	
Hartford	East Granby–Windsor Locks– Windsor tripoint	27.69	44.56	Western end of freeway section	
Hartford	East Granby–Windsor Locks– Windsor tripoint	27.69	44.56	Bradley International Airport	Access via SSR 401
Hartford	Windsor Locks–Windsor line	28.42	45.74	Hamilton Road South	
Hartford	Windsor Locks–Windsor line	29.01	46.69	Route 75 – Poquonock, Suffield	
Hartford	Windsor Locks–Windsor line	30.30	48.76	Old County Road / Kennedy Road	
Hartford	Windsor Locks–Windsor line	31.30	50.37	I-91 – Hartford, Springfield	Eastern terminus; exit 48 on I-91
1.000 mi = 1.609 km; 1.000 km = 0.621 mi: Concurrency terminus
