= Warren Congregational Church =

Historic church in Connecticut, United States

- U.S. National Register of Historic Places
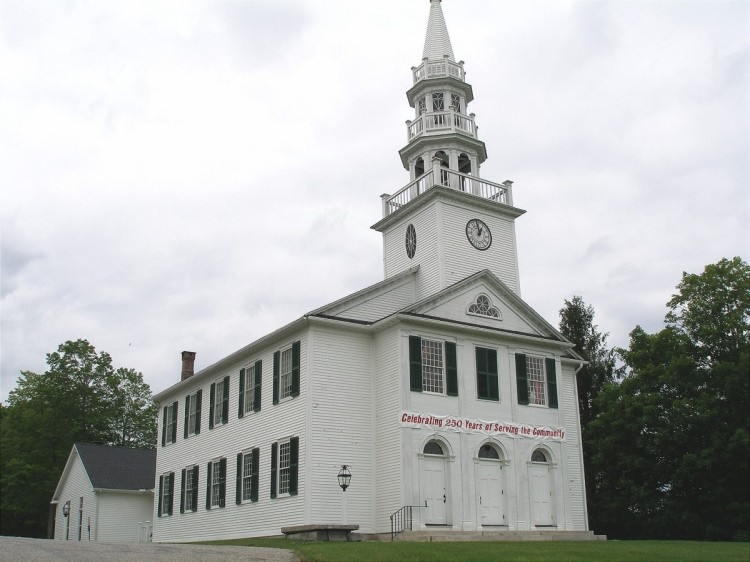

- Location within Connecticut Location within the United States
- Location: 4 Sackett Hill Road, Warren, Connecticut
- Coordinates: 41°44′37″N 73°20′58″W
- Area: 2 acres (0.81 ha)
- Built: 1818
- Architectural style: Federal
- NRHP reference No.: 91001743
- Added to NRHP: November 29, 1991

The Warren Congregational Church is a historic Congregational Church at 4 Sackett Hill Road in Warren, Connecticut. Built in 1820, it is a well-preserved example of Federal architecture. It was listed on the National Register of Historic Places in 1991.

== Description and history ==
The Warren Congregational Church occupies a prominent position in the small village center of Warren, at the Southwest Corner of Sackett Hill Road and Kent Road (Connecticut Route 341). It is a 2 1/2-story wood-frame structure, with a projecting entry pavilion topped by a gabled pediment. The pavilion is divided into three bays by two-story pilasters, with each bay containing an entrance. The identical entrances are slightly recessed behind a frame of pilasters, and are topped by half-round transom windows. Above each of the outer entrances are sash windows with shutters. The pediment has a three-part window in the center, consisting of a round window resting on two smaller half-rounds.

Construction of the church began in 1818 and was formally completed in 1820. It was built as a replacement for a Georgian style meetinghouse built in 1769 for a congregation established in 1750, when the area was still part of Kent. Its design is fairly typical of Federal style churches of the period, drawing its inspiration from pattern books such as the American Builder's Companion published in 1803 by Asher Benjamin. Its pulpit is one of only three Federal-period pulpits documented in the state. The Palladian window above the window is a careful restoration of the original, carried out in the 20th century by one of Connecticut's leading architectural historians of the early 20th century, J. Frederick Kelly.

== See also ==
- National Register of Historic Places listings in Litchfield County, Connecticut
