= Connecticut Route 181 =

State highway in northern Connecticut, US

Route 181
- Map of northern Connecticut with Route 181 highlighted in red

Route information
- Maintained by CTDOT
- Length: 7.86 mi (12.65 km)
- Existed: 1932–present

Major junctions
- South end: US 44 in Barkhamsted
- North end: Route 20 in Hartland

Location
- Country: United States
- State: Connecticut
- Counties: Litchfield, Hartford

Highway system
- Connecticut State Highway System; Interstate; US; State; SSR; SR; Scenic
← Route 179	→ Route 182

Route 181 is a rural state highway in northern Connecticut, running from Barkhamsted to Hartland.

== Route description ==
Route 181 begins as River Road at an intersection with US 44 in southern Barkhamsted. The road heads north into the village of Pleasant Valley, where it briefly overlaps Route 318 across the West Branch Farmington River. Immediately after the river crossing, it intersects with East River Road, an unsigned state highway designated as Special Service Road 482, providing access to Peoples State Forest and leading to the village of Riverton. After 0.6 miles (0.97 km), Route 181 turns northeast to follow Center Hill Road towards the Barkhamsted Reservoir. It continues north parallel to, but not quite along, the west side of the reservoir towards the town of Hartland, passing by Barkhamsted Center along the way. In Hartland, it continues for another 1.9 miles (3.1 km) before ending at an intersection with Route 20 in Hartland center.

A section of Route 181 in Barkhamsted from the southern terminus to the northern end of the overlap with Route 318 is designated as a scenic road.

== History ==
Route 181 was commissioned in 1932, running from Barkhamsted to Granby. It originally went east across a road that has been submerged by the Barkhamsted Reservoir, and continued east of Route 179 along modern Route 219 to Route 20 in Granby. The reservoir was created in 1940, splitting the route into two. As a result, Route 181 was relocated to its current route along the west side of the reservoir, ending at its current terminus at Route 20. The eastern part of the route became SR 721, which was later reassigned in 1960 as an extension of Route 219.

== Junction list ==
County	Location	mi	km	Destinations	Notes
Litchfield	Barkhamsted	0.00	0.00	US 44 – Winsted, Canton	Southern terminus
Litchfield	Barkhamsted	1.04	1.67	Route 318 west – Winsted	Southern end of Route 318 concurrency
Litchfield	Barkhamsted	1.16	1.87	East River Road (SSR 482 north)	
Litchfield	Barkhamsted	1.78	2.86	Route 318 east – Barkhamsted Center	Northern end of Route 318 concurrency
Hartford	Hartland	7.84	12.62	Route 20 – Riverton, Hartland	Northern terminus
1.000 mi = 1.609 km; 1.000 km = 0.621 mi: Concurrency terminus
