= Connecticut Route 219 =

State highway in northern Connecticut, US

Route 219
- Map of northern Connecticut with Route 219 highlighted in red

Route information
- Maintained by CTDOT
- Length: 14.98 mi (24.11 km)
- Existed: 1935–present

Major junctions
- South end: US 202 in New Hartford
- North end: Route 20 in Granby

Location
- Country: United States
- State: Connecticut
- Counties: Litchfield, Hartford

Highway system
- Connecticut State Highway System; Interstate; US; State; SSR; SR; Scenic
← Route 218	→ Route 220

Route 219 is a state highway in northern Connecticut, running from New Hartford to Granby.

== Route description ==
Route 219 begins at an intersection with US 202 in southern New Hartford and heads north, northeast, and east before crossing the West Branch Farmington River at the town center. It then continues east to cross the East Branch Farmington River before turning north along the eastern shore of the McDonough Reservoir into Barkhamsted. In Barkhamsted, it continues north along the east shore of the McDonough Reservoir to its northern end, then turns northeast. It briefly overlaps Route 179 before continuing northeast into Granby. In Granby, it continues northeast to end at an intersection with Route 20.

The section of Route 219 from the East Branch Farmington River in New Hartford to Route 318 in Barkhamsted is designated a scenic road.

== History ==
Route 219 was commissioned in 1935 from an unsigned state road (old SR 711), running from the current route of US 202 to US 44 in New Hartford, along a route including Bridge Street and Cottage Street. In 1944, Route 219 took over part of Route 179, extending it to Barkhamsted. In 1955, a section of Steele Road in New Hartford that had been town-maintained was added to the state highway system, completing state-maintenance of the route. Later in the same year, the Cottage Street Bridge was destroyed in a flood, temporarily severing the route. In 1959, the New Hartford section of the route was rerouted to its current location over a new bridge. In 1960, Route 219 was extended to its current northern terminus over a former section of Route 181 (SR 721).

== Junction list ==
County	Location	mi	km	Destinations	Notes
Litchfield	New Hartford	0.00	0.00	US 202 – Torrington, Canton	Southern terminus
Litchfield	New Hartford	4.63	7.45	US 44 – Winsted, Hartford	
Litchfield	Barkhamsted	8.66	13.94	Route 318 west – Pleasant Valley	Eastern terminus of Route 318
Litchfield	Barkhamsted	11.14	17.93	Route 179 south – Canton	Southern end of Route 179 concurrency
Litchfield	Barkhamsted	11.20	18.02	Route 179 north – East Hartland	Northern end of Route 179 concurrency
Hartford	Granby	14.98	24.11	Route 20 – Windsor Locks, East Hartland	Northern terminus
1.000 mi = 1.609 km; 1.000 km = 0.621 mi: Concurrency terminus
