= Myron Newton Morris =

American politician

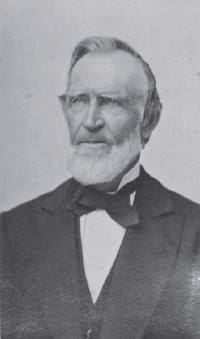
Myron Newton Morris

Myron Newton Morris (November 19, 1810 – July 9, 1885) was an American minister and politician.

Morris, the youngest child of Newton J. and Eunice (Newton) Morris, was born on one of the Yale College farms in Warren, Litchfield County, Connecticut, November 19, 1810. After his father's death, in 1830, he took charge of the farm for a year or two, and was then at length able to begin his preparation for Yale.

After he graduated from Yale in 1837, he became the principal of Bacon Academy, in Colchester, Connecticut, until the summer of 1838, and again from March, 1840 until the summer of 1843; in the interval he was instructor at the Teachers' Academy, Andover, Massachusetts. He began theological studies while in Andover, and was licensed to preach shortly after his final withdrawal from Bacon Academy. He married, January 10, 1838, Julia S., daughter of Elisha Avery, of Colchester, and he retained his residence there - engaged in farming, private teaching, and preaching - until January, 1845, when he removed to Norwich, Connecticut, where he served as teacher in the academy for two terms. While living there he accepted a call to the Congregational Church in North Stonington, Connecticut, over which he was ordained, April 15, 1846. After a pleasant pastorate of six years, he was induced, chiefly for the sake of educational advantages to his children, to accept a thrice-repeated call to the Congregational Church in West Hartford, Connecticut, where he was installed on July 1, 1852, His service there was terminated by his resignation on April 27, 1875, but his home continued among his people. While still a pastor in July, 1867, he was elected a Fellow of Yale College, and this office he retained until his death.

He was twice a Representative (in 1872 and 1875) from West Hartford to the Connecticut Legislature, and for many years one of the school-visitors for the town.

He died in West Hartford, after four days' illness, from pleurisy, July 9, 1885, in his 75th year.

His wife died March 26, 1854, and he next married, May 8, 1855, Emeline, youngest daughter of Samuel Whitman, of West Hartford, who survived him, as did a daughter and two sons by his first marriage, and a son by his second marriage; two sons died in infancy, and a third in early manhood. He published three historical discourses. In a Memorial volume which has been issued by the church in West Haitford, a tribute is paid to his character and services.
