= West Simsbury, Connecticut =

Census-designated place in Connecticut, United States

- Census-designated place
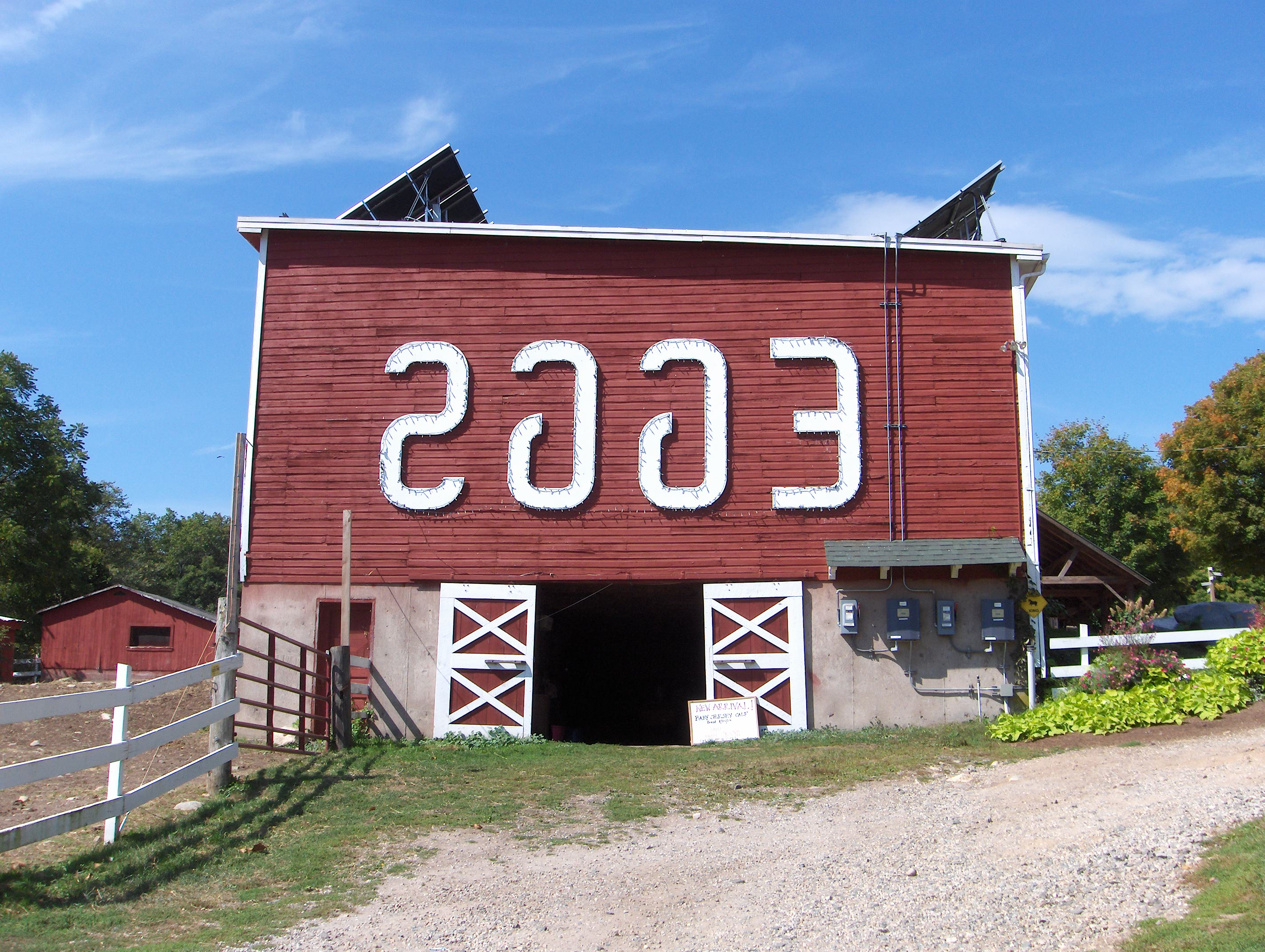
- Eggs sign at Flamig Farm in West Simsbury

- Location within Connecticut Location within the United States
- Coordinates: 41°52′23″N 72°51′29″W
- Country: United States
- State: Connecticut
- County: Hartford
- Town: Simsbury

Area
  - Total: 4.4 sq mi (11.3 km^{2})
  - Land: 4.4 sq mi (11.3 km^{2})
  - Water: 0 sq mi (0.0 km^{2})
- Elevation: 323 ft (98 m)

Population (2020)
  - Total: 2,521
  - Density: 563/sq mi (217.2/km^{2})
- Time zone: UTC-5 (Eastern)
  - Summer (DST): UTC-4 (Eastern)
- ZIP code: 06092
- Area code: 860
- FIPS code: 09-83990
- GNIS feature ID: 2377881

West Simsbury is a census-designated place (CDP) and section of the town of Simsbury, Connecticut, United States. As of the 2020 census, West Simsbury had a population of 2,521.

== Geography ==
West Simsbury occupies the west-central part of the town of Simsbury and is bordered to the east by Simsbury Center and to the south by Weatogue. Connecticut Route 309 is the main road through the community, leading east to Simsbury Center and northwest to North Canton.

According to the United States Census Bureau, the West Simsbury CDP has a total area of 4.4 square miles (11.3 km^{2}), all land.

== Demographics ==
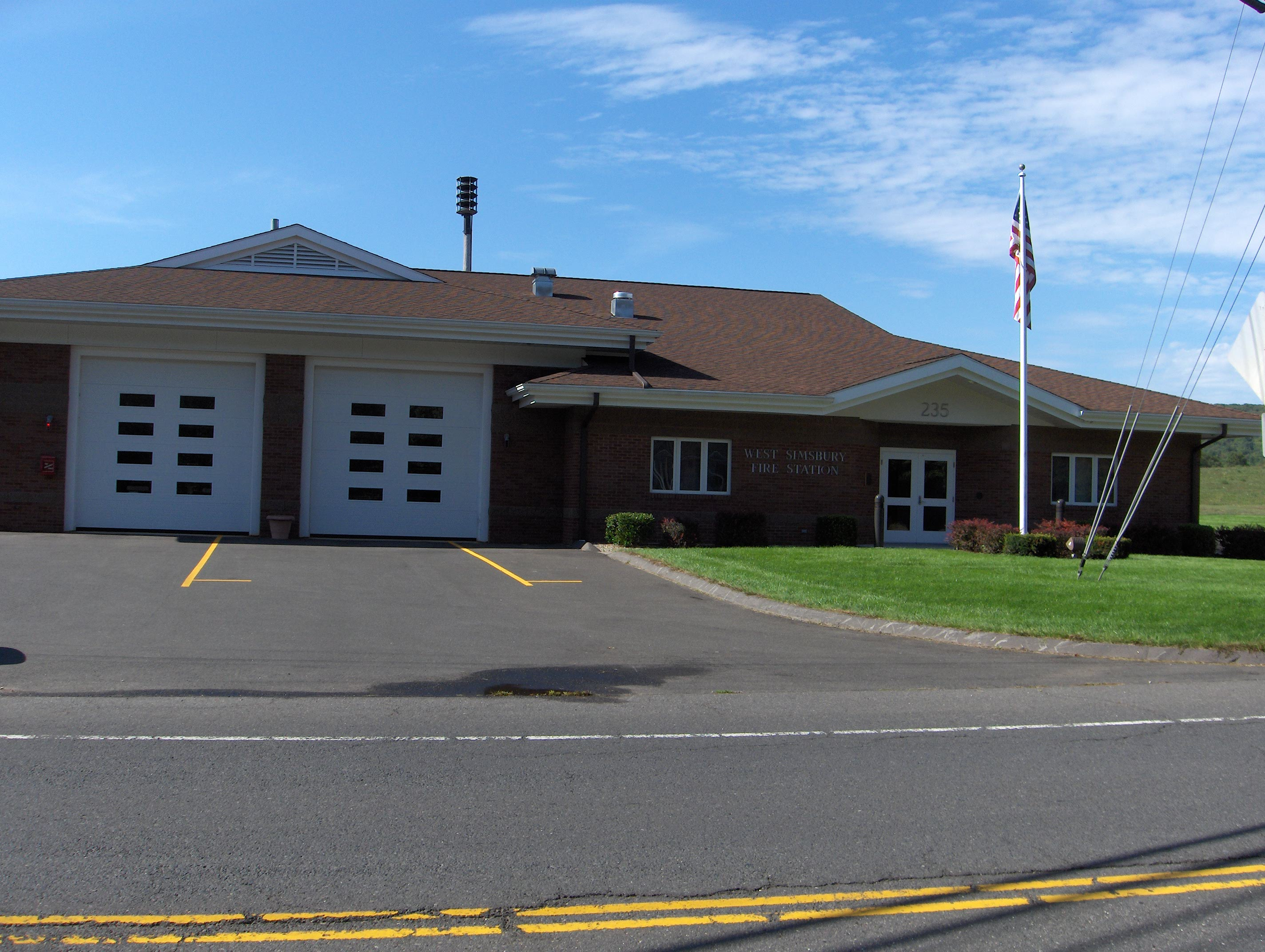
West Simsbury Fire Station

=== 2020 census ===
As of the 2020 census, West Simsbury had a population of 2,521. The median age was 49.3 years. 22.1% of residents were under the age of 18 and 24.4% were 65 years of age or older. For every 100 females, there were 95.1 males, and for every 100 females age 18 and over, there were 93.0 males.

78.7% of residents lived in urban areas, while 21.3% lived in rural areas.

There were 876 households in West Simsbury, of which 36.6% had children under the age of 18 living in them. Of all households, 72.8% were married-couple households, 6.5% were households with a male householder and no spouse or partner present, and 18.2% were households with a female householder and no spouse or partner present. About 17.7% of all households were made up of individuals, and 14.7% had someone living alone who was 65 years of age or older.

There were 936 housing units, of which 6.4% were vacant. The homeowner vacancy rate was 1.8% and the rental vacancy rate was 7.5%.

Racial composition as of the 2020 census
Race	Number	Percent
White	2,278	90.4%
Black or African American	25	1.0%
American Indian and Alaska Native	4	0.2%
Asian	89	3.5%
Native Hawaiian and Other Pacific Islander	4	0.2%
Some other race	14	0.6%
Two or more races	107	4.2%
Hispanic or Latino (of any race)	94	3.7%

=== 2000 census ===
As of the 2000 census, there were 2,395 people, 745 households, and 659 families residing in the CDP. The population density was 548.6 inhabitants per square mile (211.8/km^{2}). There were 763 housing units at an average density of 174.8 per square mile (67.5/km^{2}). The racial makeup of the CDP was 96.58% White, 0.67% African American, 0.04% Native American, 1.80% Asian, 0.04% Pacific Islander, 0.08% from other races, and 0.79% from two or more races. Hispanic or Latino of any race were 0.54% of the population.

There were 745 households, out of which 47.7% had children under the age of 18 living with them, 81.6% were married couples living together, 4.8% had a female householder with no husband present, and 11.5% were non-families. 10.1% of all households were made up of individuals, and 6.4% had someone living alone who was 65 years of age or older. The average household size was 2.98 and the average family size was 3.20.

In the CDP, the population was spread out, with 30.9% under the age of 18, 2.3% from 18 to 24, 21.7% from 25 to 44, 26.5% from 45 to 64, and 18.7% who were 65 years of age or older. The median age was 42 years. For every 100 females, there were 91.6 males. For every 100 females age 18 and over, there were 85.2 males.

=== Income and poverty ===
The median income for a household in the CDP was $154,765. The per capita income for the CDP in 2012 was $69,036. None of the families and 1.3% of the population were living below the poverty line, including no one under age 18 and 5.6% of those over 64.

== Landmark ==
Tulmeadow Farm - Founded in 1768, Tulmeadow Farm is now best known for its home-made ice cream. With the help of the Simsbury Land Trust, much of Tulmeadow Farm's farmland is protected from future development.

== Notable person ==
- Owen Brown, father of abolitionist John Brown, lived in West Simsbury.
