= Route 75 (Connecticut–Massachusetts) =

Highway in Connecticut and Massachusetts

Route 75
- Map of northern Connecticut and southern Massachusetts with CT 75 in solid red and MA 75 in dotted red

Route information
- Maintained by CTDOT
- Length: 17.53 mi (28.21 km) Connecticut: 13.52 mi (21.76 km); Massachusetts: 4.01 mi (6.45 km)
- Existed: 1932 (extended 1950)–present

Major junctions
- South end: Route 159 / Route 305 in Windsor, CT
- I-91 in Windsor, CT; Route 20 in Windsor Locks, CT; Route 57 in Agawam, MA
- North end: Route 147 / Route 159 in Agawam, MA

Location
- Country: United States
- States: Connecticut, Massachusetts
- Counties: CT: Hartford, MA: Hampden

Highway system
- Connecticut State Highway System; Interstate; US; State; SSR; SR; Scenic
- Massachusetts State Highway System; Interstate; US; State
← Route 74	CT	→ Route 77
← Route 71	MA	→ Route 78

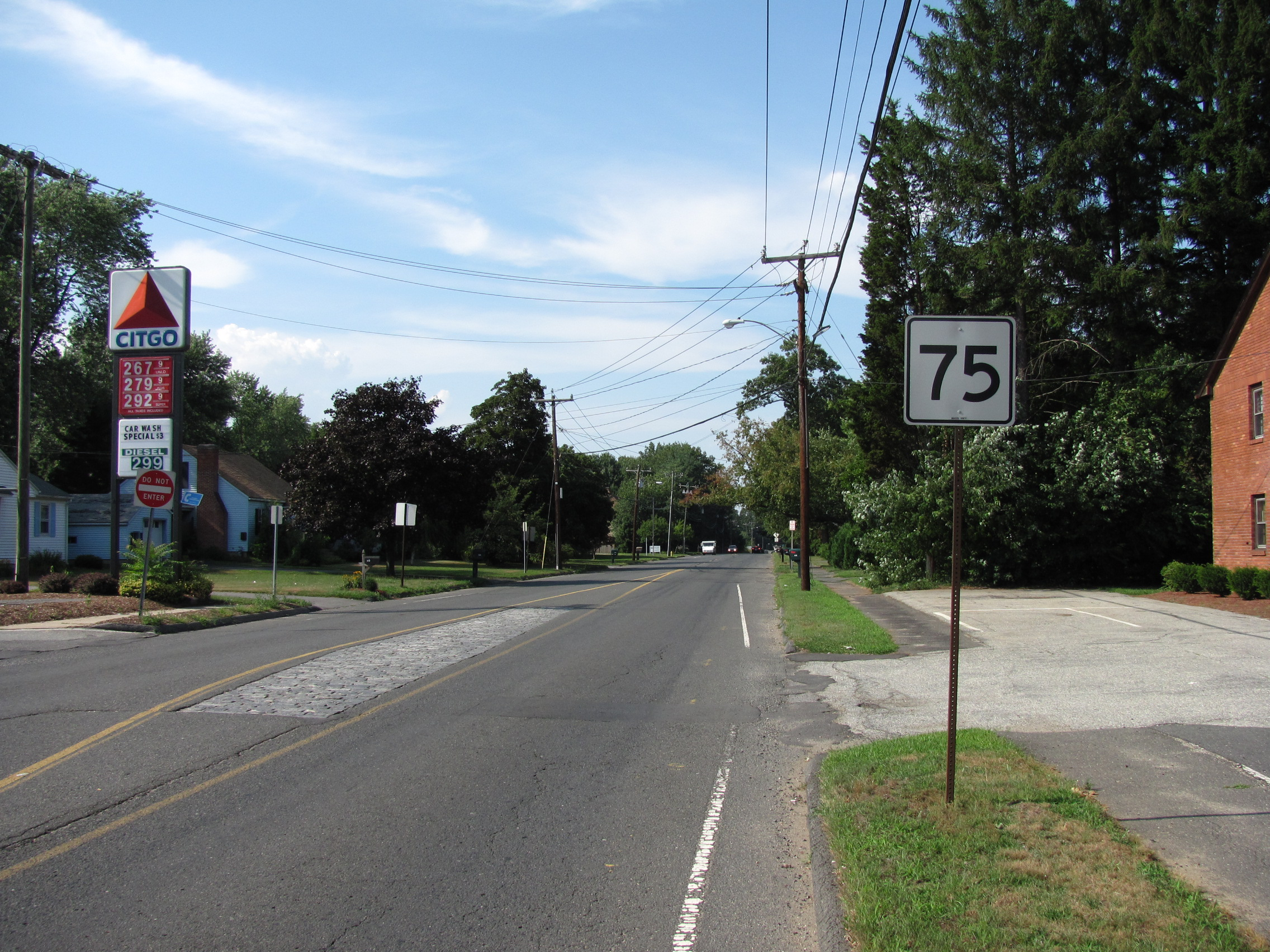
Northbound in Agawam, Massachusetts

Route 75 in the U.S. states of Connecticut and Massachusetts is a 17.5-mile-long (28.2 km) scenic route connecting the Hartford, Connecticut, and Springfield, Massachusetts, areas. The route begins at Route 159 in the town of Windsor, Connecticut, and ends at the junction of Route 159/Route 147 in the city of Agawam, Massachusetts.

The route acquired its modern designation in the 1932 state highway renumbering, becoming a loop route off then U.S. Route 5A (US 5A, modern Route 159) through the town center of Suffield. In 1950, the north end was realigned to extend into Agawam. The portion in Agawam is a municipal road and is not a state highway (i.e. not a state-maintained road).

== Route description ==
Route 75 begins as Poquonock Avenue at Route 159 in the town center of Windsor near the Windsor railroad station and heads northwest parallel to the Farmington River. It has an interchange with I-91 at Exit 38 about 1.8 miles (2.9 km) northwest of Route 159, where Route 75 also passes in front of Day Hill Mall. After another 2.1 miles (3.4 km), Route 75 crosses over the Farmington River into the village of Poquonock, and then has an interchange with the Bradley Airport Connector at the Windsor-Windsor Locks town line.

Route 75, known as Ella T. Grasso Turnpike in Windsor Locks, proceeds north along the eastern perimeter of Bradley International Airport. In this area, it intersects with SSR 401, which leads to the airport. Further north along Route 75, one can access the indoor airport parking facility and the entrance to Crown Industrial Park. Upon entering the town of Suffield, the road becomes South Street as it heads into the town center, where the road name changes to South Main Street and North Main Street. Route 75 has junctions with Route 168 (towards Southwick) and Route 190 (towards Enfield) in Suffield center. In northern Suffield, Route 75 is known as North Street and eventually crosses the state line into Agawam, Massachusetts.

In Massachusetts, Route 75 passes through the villages of Hubbard Corner and Suffield Corner within the city of Agawam heading into the downtown area. The road has an interchange with the expressway section of Route 57 north of Suffield Corner. Route 75 ends at the intersection of Route 147 and Route 159 in Agawam center just south of the West Springfield city line.

== History ==
In the 1920s, when Connecticut first numbered its state highways, the road between Windsor center and Suffield center via the village of Poquonock was a secondary route designated as State Highway 362. Old Highway 362 was renumbered to Route 75 as part of the 1932 state highway renumbering. The original Route 75 continued past Suffield center along Mapleton Avenue (modern Route 190) to end at US 5A (modern Route 159). The route was extended north to the Massachusetts state line and into the city of Agawam in 1950. While numbered as Route 75, the road in Agawam is not officially a state highway and is maintained by the city. The former connection to US 5A became an unsigned state road for several years until the relocation of Route 190.

== Special designations ==
The northernmost 4.3 miles (6.9 km) of Route 75 within the town of Suffield is a designated state scenic road.

The portion of Route 75 in Windsor Locks was originally known as Turnpike Road and still appears as such on some maps, including Google Maps. Its alignment alongside Bradley International Airport sustained heavy damage on October 3, 1979, when a F4 tornado destroyed or damaged many businesses and residences along the corridor, including the original Bradley Air Museum. In 1981, as enacted by Public Act 81-463, this portion of Route 75, by then repaired and revitalized, was officially renamed the Ella T. Grasso Turnpike, in honor of the first elected female governor in the United States (and a native of Windsor Locks).

== Major intersections ==
State	County	Location	mi	km	Destinations	Notes
Connecticut	Hartford	Windsor	0.00	0.00	Route 159 – Windsor Locks, Wilson	Southern terminus
Connecticut	Hartford	Windsor	0.07	0.11	Route 305 west – Bloomfield	Eastern terminus of Route 305
Connecticut	Hartford	Windsor	1.80	2.90	I-91 / Day Hill Road – Springfield, Hartford	Interchange; exit 45A on I-91
Connecticut	Hartford	Windsor Locks	4.99	8.03	Route 20 to I-91 – East Granby	Interchange
Connecticut	Hartford	Windsor Locks	5.68	9.14	Schoephoester Road (SSR 401 east) – Bradley International Airport	
Connecticut	Hartford	Windsor Locks	6.02	9.69	Route 140 east – Warehouse Point	Western terminus of Route 140
Connecticut	Hartford	Suffield	9.97	16.05	Route 168 west – West Suffield, Southwick	Eastern terminus of Route 168
Connecticut	Hartford	Suffield	11.01	17.72	Route 190 east to Route 159 – Enfield	Western terminus of Route 190
Connecticut–Massachusetts state line			13.52 0.00	21.76 0.00	Route transition	
Massachusetts	Hampden	Agawam	2.93	4.72	Route 57 – Southwick, Springfield	Interchange
Massachusetts	Hampden	Agawam	4.01	6.45	Route 147 / Route 159 south to US 5 – West Springfield, Feeding Hills, Agawam Center	Northern terminus; northern terminus of Route 159
1.000 mi = 1.609 km; 1.000 km = 0.621 mi: Route transition
