= Connecticut Route 45 =

State highway in Litchfield County, Connecticut, US

Route 45
- Map of Litchfield County in northwestern Connecticut with Route 45 highlighted in red

Route information
- Maintained by CTDOT
- Length: 10.29 mi (16.56 km)
- Existed: 1932–present

Major junctions
- South end: US 202 in Washington
- North end: US 7 in Cornwall

Location
- Country: United States
- State: Connecticut
- Counties: Litchfield

Highway system
- Connecticut State Highway System; Interstate; US; State; SSR; SR; Scenic
← US 44	→ Route 47

Route 45 is a Connecticut state highway from US 202 in Washington to US 7 in Cornwall, in the rural northwest of the state. It is 10.29 miles (16.56 km) long and runs north–south.

== Route description ==
Route 45 begins as East Shore Road at an intersection with US 202 in the New Preston section of the town of Washington. It heads north along the eastern shore of Lake Waramaug and soon enters the town of Warren. In Warren, the road is known as Lake Road. An alternate route going around the south, west, and north shores of the lake can be accessed from Route 45. This western loop is an unsigned state highway known as Special Service Road 478. About 1.6 miles (2.6 km) north of the lake, Route 45 then enters the town center of Warren where it is joined by Route 341 for 1.7 miles (2.7 km). After Route 341 separates, Route 45 continues northward along Cornwall Road towards the town of Cornwall. It enters Cornwall after 2.5 miles (4.0 km), becoming Warren Hill Road. Route 45 ends 2.3 miles (3.7 km) northwest of the town line in the Cornwall Bridge section of town, at an intersection with US 7 near the Housatonic River, which runs along the western town line of Cornwall.

The 0.6-mile (0.97 km) portion of Route 45 running along the east shore of Lake Waramaug is a state-designated scenic route. It runs from milepost 0.56 at West Shore Road in Washington to milepost 2.15 at North Shore Road in Warren. In 2010, the 0.50-mile segment of Route 45 running from the Junction with Route 202, through New Preston village, to the intersection with East Shore Road and Flirtation Avenue, also received state scenic designation.

== History ==
The road from New Preston to Warren center, and continuing north up to the Housatonic River south of Cornwall Bridge, was designated as a state highway in 1922. It was then known as Highway 152. Old Highway 152 was renumbered to Route 45 as part of the 1932 state highway renumbering.

== Junction list ==
The entire route is in Litchfield County.

Location	mi	km	Destinations	Notes
Washington	0.00	0.00	US 202 – Litchfield, New Milford	Southern terminus
Warren	3.75	6.04	Route 341 east – Woodville	Southern end of Route 341 concurrency
Warren	5.41	8.71	Route 341 west – Kent	Northern end of Route 341 concurrency
Cornwall	10.29	16.56	US 7 – Kent, Lime Rock	Northern terminus
1.000 mi = 1.609 km; 1.000 km = 0.621 mi
