= New Hartford Center, Connecticut =

- Census-designated place
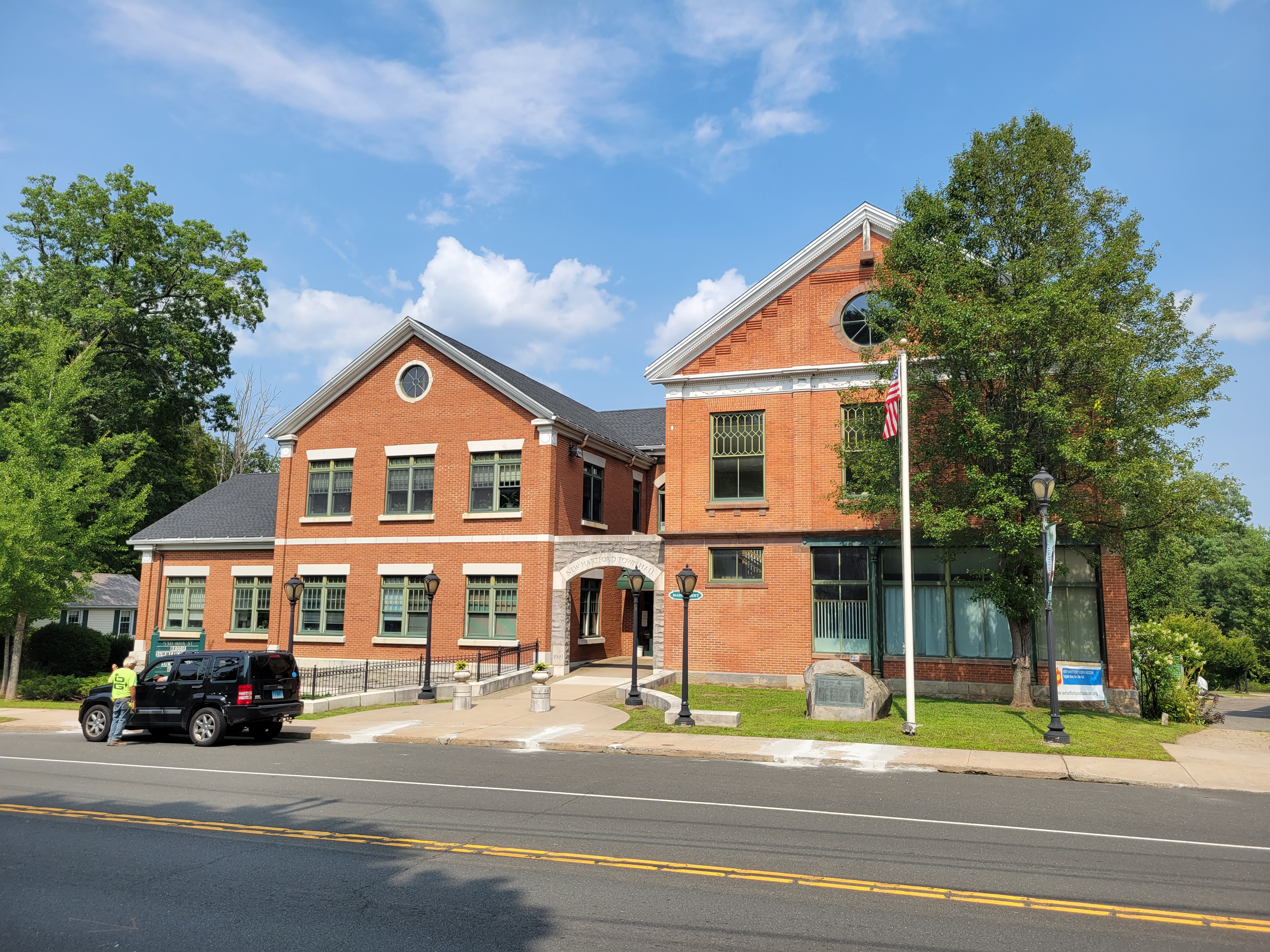
- Town Hall

- Location in Litchfield County, Connecticut
- Coordinates: 41°52′42″N 72°58′47″W
- State: Connecticut
- County: Litchfield
- Town: New Hartford

Area
  - Total: 3.38 sq mi (8.76 km^{2})
  - Land: 3.18 sq mi (8.23 km^{2})
  - Water: 0.20 sq mi (0.53 km^{2})
- Elevation: 400 ft (120 m)

Population (2010)
  - Total: 1,385
  - Density: 436/sq mi (168.3/km^{2})
- ZIP Code: 06057
- FIPS code: 09-51420
- GNIS feature ID: 2377835

New Hartford Center is a census-designated place (CDP) in Litchfield County, Connecticut, United States. It comprises the village of New Hartford, the adjacent Pine Meadow Historic District, and some surrounding forest land, all within the town of New Hartford. As of the 2020 census, New Hartford Center had a population of 1,284.

== Geography ==
New Hartford Center is in the northeastern part of the town of New Hartford, in the valley of the West Branch of the Farmington River. The northern edge of the CDP follows the New Hartford–Barkhamsted town line. The CDP extends east to Connecticut Route 219 on the east side of Lake McDonough, a reservoir on the East Branch of the Farmington River. The CDP extends south nearly to the confluence of the East and West Branches of the Farmington, then runs west along Henderson Road to Steele Road and Burdick Road. The western edge of the CDP follows an unnamed brook about 0.5 miles (0.80 km) west of the village, north to the Barkhamsted town line.

U.S. Route 44 passes through the community as Main Street, leading northwest 6 miles (10 km) to Winsted and southeast 19 miles (31 km) to Hartford, the state capital. Connecticut Route 219 leads southwest through the town of New Hartford 4 miles (6 km) to U.S. Route 202, and northeast 6 miles (10 km) to Barkhamsted.

According to the U.S. Census Bureau, the New Hartford Center CDP has a total area of 3.4 square miles (8.8 km^{2}), of which 3.2 square miles (8.2 km^{2}) are land and 0.19 square miles (0.5 km^{2}), or 6.09%, are water.

== Demographics ==
=== 2020 census ===
As of the 2020 census, New Hartford Center had a population of 1,284. The median age was 42.6 years. 20.0% of residents were under the age of 18 and 17.6% of residents were 65 years of age or older. For every 100 females there were 92.5 males, and for every 100 females age 18 and over there were 92.7 males age 18 and over.

0.0% of residents lived in urban areas, while 100.0% lived in rural areas.

There were 586 households in New Hartford Center, of which 20.1% had children under the age of 18 living in them. Of all households, 43.5% were married-couple households, 22.5% were households with a male householder and no spouse or partner present, and 26.8% were households with a female householder and no spouse or partner present. About 36.6% of all households were made up of individuals and 18.2% had someone living alone who was 65 years of age or older.

There were 657 housing units, of which 10.8% were vacant. The homeowner vacancy rate was 2.1% and the rental vacancy rate was 9.4%.

Racial composition as of the 2020 census
Race	Number	Percent
White	1,194	93.0%
Black or African American	4	0.3%
American Indian and Alaska Native	0	0.0%
Asian	19	1.5%
Native Hawaiian and Other Pacific Islander	1	0.1%
Some other race	6	0.5%
Two or more races	60	4.7%
Hispanic or Latino (of any race)	38	3.0%

=== 2010 census ===
As of the census of 2010, there were 1,385 people, 592 households, and 375 families residing in the CDP. The population density was 436 inhabitants per square mile (168/km^{2}). There were 635 housing units, of which 43, or 6.8%, were vacant. The racial makeup of the CDP was 95.4% White, 0.8% African American, 0.2% Native American, 1.4% Asian, 0.3% some other race, and 1.9% from two or more races. Hispanic or Latino of any race were 3.0% of the population.

Of the 592 households in the community, 28.0% had children under the age of 18 living with them, 47.3% were headed by married couples living together, 11.8% had a female householder with no husband present, and 36.7% were non-families. 27.2% of all households were made up of individuals, and 7.4% were someone living alone who was 65 years of age or older. The average household size was 2.33, and the average family size was 2.85.

20.6% of the CDP population were under the age of 18, 7.0% were from 18 to 24, 26.5% were from 25 to 44, 34.0% were from 45 to 64, and 11.9% were 65 years of age or older. The median age was 42.3 years. For every 100 females, there were 104.0 males. For every 100 females age 18 and over, there were 104.1 males.

=== Income and poverty ===
For the period 2013–17, the estimated median income for a household in the CDP was $49,750, and the median income for a family was $60,859. The per capita income for the CDP was $26,122.

== Education ==
It is in the New Hartford School District.
