= Old Furnace State Park =

State park in Windham County, Connecticut

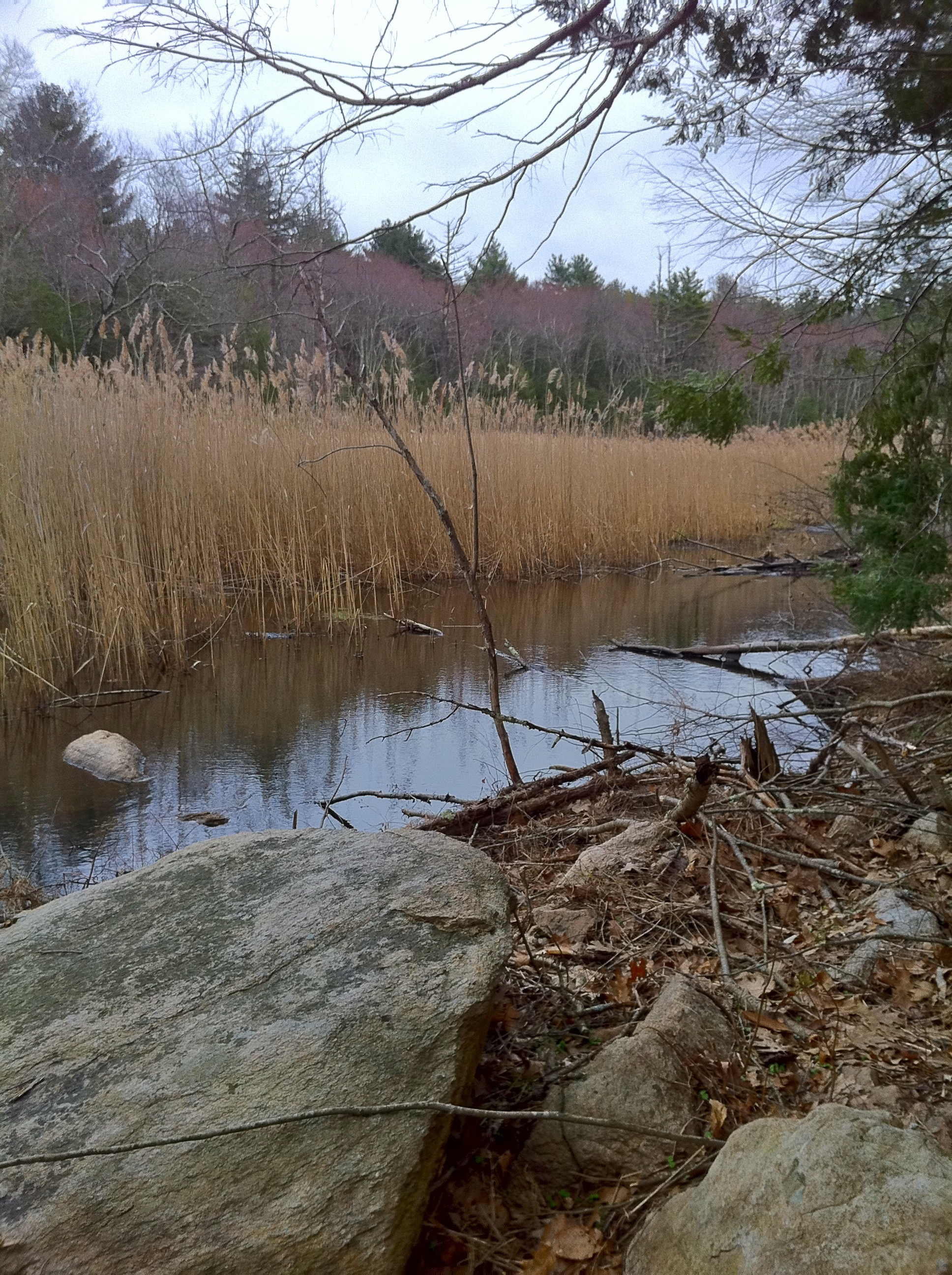
- Marsh with reeds along Half Hill Brook on Old Furnace Trail

- Location within Connecticut Location within the United States
- Location: Killingly, Connecticut, United States
- Coordinates: 41°46′55″N 71°52′01″W
- Area: 367 acres (149 ha)
- Elevation: 390 ft (120 m)
- Designation: Connecticut state park
- Established: 1918
- Named for: An old iron furnace
- Administrator: Connecticut Department of Energy and Environmental Protection
- Website: Old Furnace State Park

Old Furnace State Park is a public recreation area adjacent to Ross Pond State Park in the town of Killingly, Connecticut. The state parks covers 367 acres (149 ha), sits at an elevation of 390 feet (120 m), and is open year-round for hiking, hunting, and fishing. It is located east of Interstate 395, south of U.S. Route 6 and north of Connecticut Route 695. The park is the site of a former iron furnace. It was established as a town park in 1909 before being transferred to the state in 1918.

== History ==
Old Furnace State Park is named for an iron furnace that operated on the site from prior to the American Revolutionary War until the mid-19th century when the locally found natural resources to make the iron were depleted. During the Revolution the furnace produced iron that was converted into horseshoes that were sold to the Continental Army. The furnace was one of many industrial locations found at the fall line throughout the New England states. Industries grew in this area to harness the potential energy to power all sorts of machinery including gristmills, sawmills and textile factories.

Land use in Killingly changed over the years and by the 1830s a gristmill was situated in what is now the park. The furnace remained in operation as did a forge. The furnace was very similar to others constructed in New England during the time period. The natural resources were found locally. Iron ore was mined from swamps and bogs. Charcoal was produced from the many trees in the local forests. Limestone and gabbro were used as flux. Hot air powered by large waterwheels was blasted into the fires of the furnace. The iron ore was converted into molten iron that was used to produce horseshoes and later metal parts for the many cotton mills that were built in the Killingly area.

William Pike was the last owner of the land on which the industries were located. He sold his property to the town of Killingly in 1909. The town established a park at "Old Furnace" and later sold the land to the state of Connecticut in 1918. The park was originally just 4.5 acres (1.8 ha). It grew considerably with the addition of the "Ross Camp" area in 1964 and now is 367 acres (149 ha).

== Ecology ==
The old-growth forests of Eastern Connecticut were stripped away to provide wood for charcoal and lumber for homes, factories, and business. Iron ore was extracted from the ground. Land was cleared for farming. Since the end of the industrial era, the trees have come back. Little evidence of the industrial past remains. Man-made ponds provide habitats for a variety of wildlife. The foundations and stone walls are now surrounded by a second growth forest of deciduous and coniferous trees including eastern hemlock, pitch pine, eastern white pine, oak, beech, maple, birch, and hickory. There are several streams and wetlands in the park. These in addition to the ponds are ideal for the growth of waterlillies, skunk cabbage and cattails. Some invasive species are cause for concern for biologists. Purple loosestrife and Phragmites are choking out native plants.

== Recreation ==
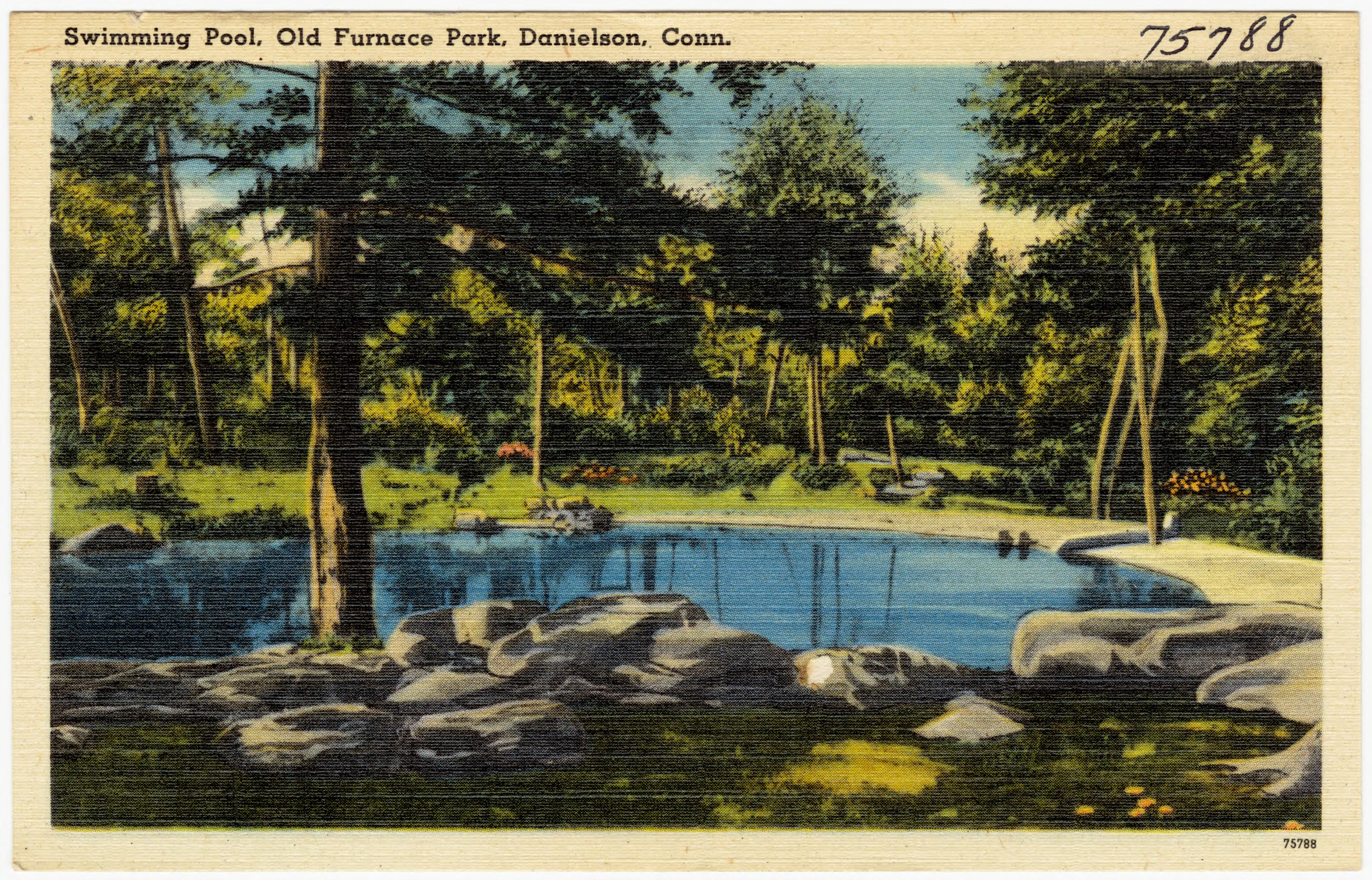
Postcard c.1940s

Old Furnace State Park is open for year-round recreation including hiking, hunting, fishing and boating. The 3-mile (4.8 km) long Connecticut Forest and Park Association "Blue-Blazed" Old Furnace Trail hiking trail begins at the parking lot near U.S. Route 6 on the northern edge of the park. The trail crosses Furnace Brook and passes by several man-made ponds then ascends Half Hill 200 feet (61 m) to a cliff from which parts of neighboring Rhode Island may be viewed.
