= Brookfield Center, Connecticut =

Census-designated place in Connecticut, United States

- Census-designated place
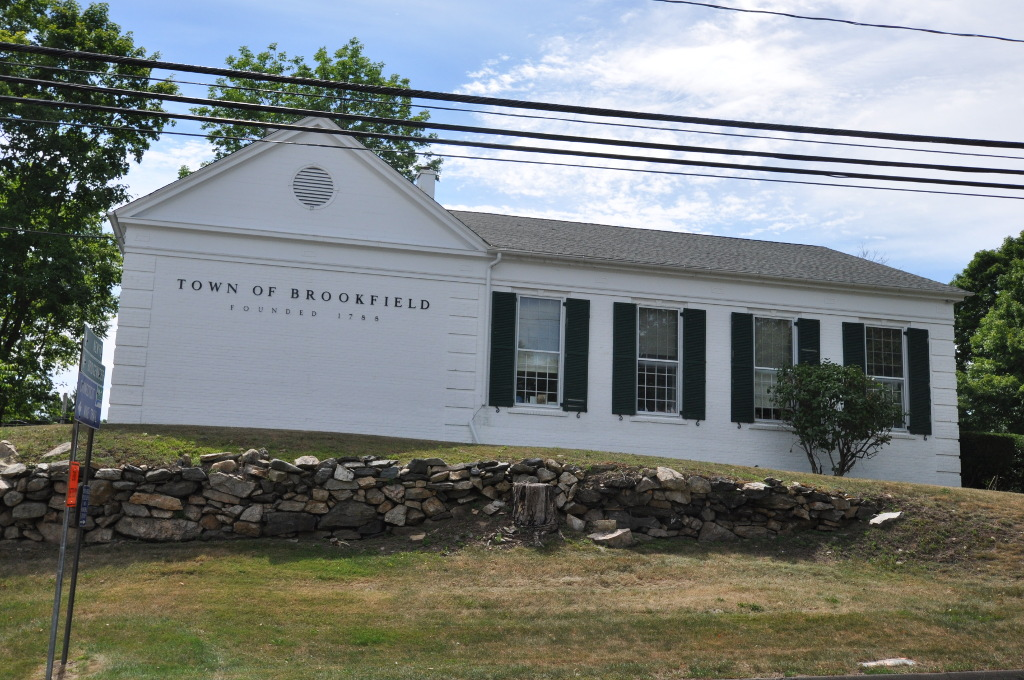
- Town office building in Brookfield Center

- Location within the Western Connecticut Planning Region and the state of Connecticut

- Location within Connecticut Location within the United States
- Coordinates: 41°27′56″N 73°23′15″W
- Country: United States
- State: Connecticut
- County: Fairfield
- Town: Brookfield

Area
  - Total: 0.51 sq mi (1.32 km^{2})
  - Land: 0.51 sq mi (1.32 km^{2})
  - Water: 0 sq mi (0.0 km^{2})
- Elevation: 495 ft (151 m)
- Time zone: UTC-5 (Eastern (EST))
  - Summer (DST): UTC-4 (EDT)
- ZIP Code: 06804 (Brookfield)
- Area codes: 203/475
- FIPS code: 09-08910
- GNIS feature ID: 2805933

Brookfield Center is a census-designated place (CDP) in the town of Brookfield, Fairfield County, Connecticut, United States. It includes the 43-acre (17 ha) Brookfield Center Historic District around the intersection of Connecticut Routes 25 and 133, as well as surrounding residential neighborhoods. As of the 2020 census, Brookfield Center had a population of 545.

Brookfield Center was first listed as a CDP prior to the 2020 census.
