= Connecticut Route 309 =

State highway in Hartford County, Connecticut, US

Route 309
- Map of Hartford County in northern Connecticut with Route 309 highlighted in red

Route information
- Maintained by CTDOT
- Length: 4.74 mi (7.63 km)
- Existed: 1963–present

Major junctions
- West end: Route 179 in Canton
- East end: Route 167 in Simsbury

Location
- Country: United States
- State: Connecticut
- Counties: Hartford

Highway system
- Connecticut State Highway System; Interstate; US; State; SSR; SR; Scenic
← Route 305	→ Route 313

Route 309 is a Connecticut state highway in the northwestern Hartford suburbs running from Canton to Simsbury.

== Route description ==
Route 309 begins at an intersection with Route 179 in North Canton and heads southeast into Simsbury. In Simsbury, it curves southeast and east to end at an intersection with Route 167.

== History ==
North Canton Road and West Simsbury Road was established as SR 909 in 1962 as part of the Route Reclassification Act. The following year, SR 909 became a signed route, with the designation Route 309.

== Junction list ==
The entire route is in Hartford County.

Location	mi	km	Destinations	Notes
Canton	0.00	0.00	Route 179 – Collinsville, Barkhamsted	Western terminus
Simsbury	4.74	7.63	Route 167 – Avon, Simsbury Center	Eastern terminus
1.000 mi = 1.609 km; 1.000 km = 0.621 mi
