= Warren, Connecticut =

- Town
- Town of Warren
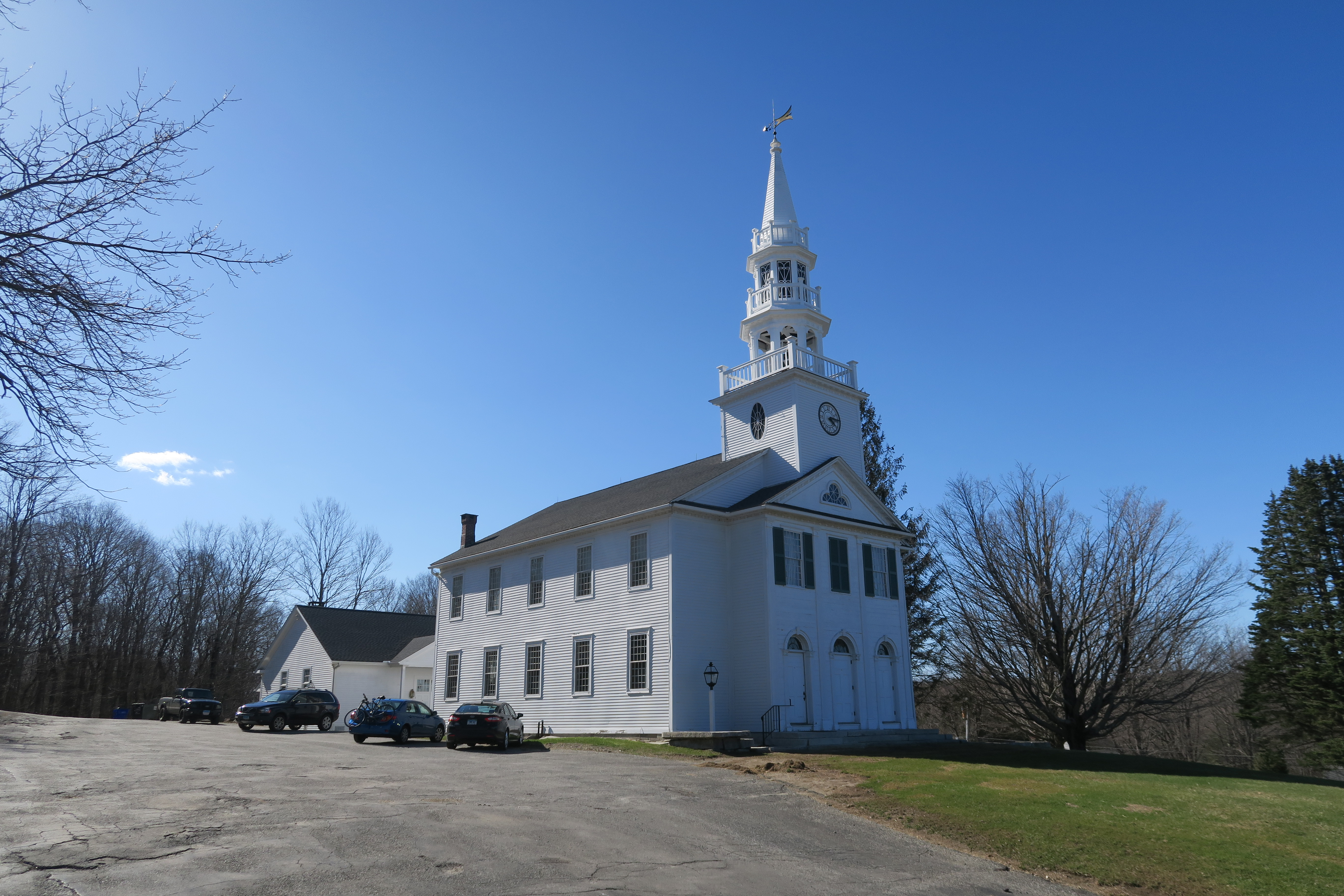
- Warren Congregational Church

- Seal

- Coordinates: 41°44′11″N 73°20′32″W
- Country: United States
- U.S. state: Connecticut
- County: Litchfield
- Region: Northwest Hills
- Incorporated: 1786

Government
  - Type: Selectman-town meeting
  - First selectman: Tim Angevine

Area
  - Total: 27.6 sq mi (71.4 km^{2})
  - Land: 26.3 sq mi (68.1 km^{2})
  - Water: 1.2 sq mi (3.2 km^{2})
- Elevation: 1,257 ft (383 m)

Population (2020)
  - Total: 1,351
  - Density: 51/sq mi (19.8/km^{2})
- Time zone: UTC-5 (Eastern)
  - Summer (DST): UTC-4 (Eastern)
- ZIP code: 06754 06777
- Area codes: 860/959
- FIPS code: 09-79510
- GNIS feature ID: 0213523
- Website: www.warrenct.gov

Warren is a town in Litchfield County, Connecticut, United States. The population was 1,351 at the 2020 census. The town is part of the Northwest Hills Planning Region. The town was named for Revolutionary War General Joseph Warren.

On July 1, 2006, businessman Joseph Cicio placed most of Warren's commercial district on eBay for $5,000,000.

== Geography ==
Warren is in west-central Litchfield County, 28 miles (45 km) north of Danbury, 24 miles (39 km) northwest of Waterbury, and 42 miles (68 km) west of Hartford. According to the United States Census Bureau, the town has a total area of 27.6 square miles (71.4 km^{2}), of which 26.3 square miles (68.1 km^{2}) are land and 1.2 square miles (3.2 km^{2})|, or 4.50%, are water.

== Demographics ==
Historical population
Census	Pop.	Note	%±
1820	875		—
1850	830		—
1860	710		−14.5%
1870	673		−5.2%
1880	639		−5.1%
1890	477		−25.4%
1900	432		−9.4%
1910	412		−4.6%
1920	350		−15.0%
1930	303		−13.4%
1940	328		8.3%
1950	437		33.2%
1960	600		37.3%
1970	827		37.8%
1980	1,027		24.2%
1990	1,226		19.4%
2000	1,254		2.3%
2010	1,461		16.5%
2020	1,351		−7.5%
U.S. Decennial Census

As of the census of 2000, there were 1,254 people, 497 households, and 353 families living in the town. The population density was 47.7 inhabitants per square mile (18.4/km^{2}). There were 650 housing units at an average density of 24.7 per square mile (9.5/km^{2}). The racial makeup of the town was 97.93% White, 0.16% African American, 0.32% Native American, 0.80% Asian, 0.08% from other races, and 0.72% from two or more races. Hispanic or Latino of any race were 0.24% of the population.

There were 497 households, out of which 29.8% had children under the age of 18 living with them, 63.6% were married couples living together, 5.0% had a female householder with no husband present, and 28.8% were non-families. 21.9% of all households were made up of individuals, and 11.1% had someone living alone who was 65 years of age or older. The average household size was 2.52 and the average family size was 2.97.

In the town, the age distribution of the population shows 22.6% under the age of 18, 5.1% from 18 to 24, 28.3% from 25 to 44, 29.0% from 45 to 64, and 14.9% who were 65 years of age or older. The median age was 42 years. For every 100 females, there were 106.3 males. For every 100 females age 18 and over, there were 105.1 males.

The median income for a household in the town was $62,798, and the median income for a family was $66,563. Males had a median income of $50,469 versus $35,250 for females. The per capita income for the town was $36,801. About 2.8% of families and 3.3% of the population were below the poverty line, including 6.3% of those under age 18 and 2.1% of those age 65 or over.

== Transportation ==
Connecticut Route 45 is the main north–south highway, while Connecticut Route 341 is the main east–west highway in the town. Route 45 leads north 5 miles (8 km) to U.S. Route 7 in Cornwall and south the same distance to New Preston, while Route 341 leads southeast five miles to U.S. Route 202 at Woodville and west 8 miles (13 km) to Kent.

== Notable location ==
- Warren Congregational Church – built in 1818 and added to the National Register of Historic Places in 1991.

== Notable people ==
- Herbert Abrams (1921–2003), portrait artist
- Lorenzo Carter (1767–1814), the first permanent settler of Cleveland, Ohio; born in Warren
- Charles Finney (1792–1875), Presbyterian minister, leader in the Second Great Awakening; born in Warren
- Miloš Forman (1932–2018), film director; lived in Warren with his wife, Martina Forman, an author
- Morton Gottlieb (1921–2009), theatrical and film producer
- Cleve Gray (1918–2004), painter
- Myron N. Morris (1810–1885), state representative
- Francine du Plessix Gray (1930–2019), writer
- Philip Roth (1933–2018), writer; maintained a house in Warren
- Eric Sloane (1905-1985) American landscape painter and illustrator author of history and folklore.
