= List of special service roads in Connecticut =

Special Service Road System

System information
- Notes: Special service roads in Connecticut maintained by ConnDOT

Highway names
- Interstates: Interstate X (I-X)
- US Highways: U.S. Route X (US X)
- State: Route X

System links
- Connecticut State Highway System; Interstate; US; State; SSR; SR; Scenic

In the U.S. state of Connecticut, state highways are grouped into signed routes, unsigned special service roads (SSR), and unsigned state roads (SR). Special service roads are roads that connect a federal or state facility (including state parks and some Interstate Highway interchanges) to a signed state route. Roads classified by the Connecticut Department of Transportation as special service roads are given an unsigned number designation between 400 and 499, or 1001.

Number	Length (mi)	Length (km)	Southern or western terminus	Northern or eastern terminus	Formed	Removed	Notes
SSR 401	2.29	3.69	Route 20 in Windsor Locks	Route 75 in Windsor Locks	—	—	Bradley Airport Connector
SSR 403	1.09	1.75	One-way loop access road between Bradley Airport Connector (SSR 401) and Bradley International Airport terminal in Windsor Locks		—	—	
SSR 404	0.81	1.30	Route 220 in Enfield	Willard-Cybulski Correctional Institution	—	—	Shaker Road, Bilton Road
SSR 405	0.47	0.76	Route 175 in Newington	Hartford Regional Center	—	—	Patricia M. Genova Drive
SSR 410	2.28	3.67	Route 154 in Middletown	Pratt & Whitney Aircraft Plant	—	—	Aircraft Road
SSR 411	1.98	3.19	Route 3 in Rocky Hill	Route 99 in Rocky Hill	—	—	Serves Dinosaur State Park and Arboretum
SSR 422	0.31	0.50	Route 99 in Wethersfield	Hartford Avenue in Wethersfield	—	—	Nott Street
SSR 423	0.31	0.50	South Road in Farmington	State Highway Garage	—	—	
SSR 424	0.86	1.38	Route 175 in Wethersfield	Road end	—	—	Russell Road
SSR 426	0.20	0.32	Route 14 in Plainfield	Quinebaug Valley Fish Hatchery	—	—	Russell Road
SSR 429	0.67	1.08	Route 149 in Colchester	Day Pond State Park	—	—	
SSR 430	0.86	1.38	Route 195 in Mansfield	North Eagleville Road in Mansfield	—	—	Serves University of Connecticut
SSR 431	2.39	3.85	Route 148 in Lyme	Route 82 in East Haddam	—	—	Serves Gillette Castle State Park
SSR 432	0.54	0.87	US 1 in East Lyme	Stone's Ranch Military Reservation	—	—	
SSR 433	1.28	2.06	Route 32 in Montville	Fort Shantok Archeological District	—	—	
SSR 434	10.13	16.30	Route 82 in East Haddam	Route 82 in East Haddam	—	—	Serves Devil's Hopyard State Park
SSR 435	0.21	0.34	US 6 in Killingly	Old Furnace State Park	—	—	
SSR 437	0.44	0.71	Route 32 in New London	State Pier	—	—	Crystal Avenue
SSR 438	2.90	4.67	US 44 in Putnam	Quaddick Town Farm Road in Thompson	—	—	
SSR 439	0.56	0.90	Route 151 in East Hampton	Hurd Park Road in East Haddam	—	—	Serves Hurd State Park
SSR 449	1.07	1.72	Route 156 in East Lyme	I-95 in East Lyme	—	—	Rocky Neck Connector; serves Rocky Neck State Park
SSR 450	4.46	7.18	US 1 in Madison	Route 79 in Madison	—	—	Hammonasset Connector, Duck Hole Road, Horse Pond Road; serves Hammonasset Beach State Park
SSR 453	0.32	0.51	Route 10 in Hamden	Mount Carmel Avenue in Hamden	—	—	Serves Sleeping Giant State Park
SSR 454	1.89	3.04	Route 110 in Shelton	Birchbank Road in Shelton	—	—	Serves Indian Well State Park
SSR 476	1.41	2.27	Sherwood Island State Park in Westport	US 1 in Westport	—	—	Sherwood Island Connector
SSR 478	6.08	9.78	Route 45 in Washington	Route 45 in Warren	—	—	Serves Lake Waramaug State Park
SSR 479	0.25	0.40	US 202 in Washington	Mount Tom State Park	—	—	
SSR 480	0.77	1.24	Route 4 in Cornwall	Great Hollow Road in Cornwall	—	—	Serves Mohawk Mountain State Park
SSR 481	0.28	0.45	Route 39 in New Fairfield	Squantz Pond State Park	—	—	
SSR 482	4.11	6.61	Route 181 / Route 318 in Barkhamsted	Route 20 in Barkhamsted	—	—	Serves Peoples State Forest
SSR 483	0.49	0.79	Winsted Road (SR 800) in Torrington	Burr Pond State Park	—	—	
SSR 485	1.17	1.88	Route 4 in Torrington	University of Connecticut, Torrington campus	—	—	University Drive
SSR 486	1.08	1.74	Route 188 in Southbury	Waterbury–Oxford Airport in Oxford	—	—	
SSR 487	4.24	6.82	Route 67 in Southbury	Kettletown State Park	—	—	
SSR 488	0.90	1.45	Route 20 in Hartland	Mill Street	—	—	Serves Tunxis State Forest
SSR 489	0.17	0.27	Route 4 in Burlington	Connecticut State Fish Hatchery	—	—	
SSR 490	1.10	1.77	Route 34 in Newtown	Garner Correctional Institution	—	—	Nunnawauk Road, Wasserman Way; provides access to I-84
SSR 492	0.24	0.39	US 6 / Route 67 in Southbury	State Highway Garage	—	—	
SSR 493	0.34	0.55	Station Place in Stamford	US 1 / Route 137 in Stamford	—	—	Washington Boulevard; serves Stamford Transportation Center

== See also ==
- List of state routes in Connecticut
