= Scenic Byways in Connecticut =

Official designation in Connecticut, US

State Byways in Connecticut

System information
- Formed: June 6, 1989

Highway names
- Interstates: Interstate X (I-X)
- US Highways: U.S. Route X (US X)
- State: Route X

System links
- Connecticut State Highway System; Interstate; US; State; SSR; SR; Scenic

Connecticut Scenic Byways are scenic byways that have been officially designated by the State of Connecticut in the state. The law creating scenic byways by the state came into effect in 1989.

== Connecticut Scenic Byways ==
List of Connecticut Scenic Byways
Route	Town	Length (mi)	Length (km)	National Byway	Date established
US 1	Madison	2.34	3.77	No	October 14, 2008
US 1	Old Lyme	0.96	1.54	No	June 8, 2012
Route 4	Farmington, Burlington	2.02	3.25	No	March 26, 2013
Route 4	Sharon	3.17	5.10	No	July 26, 1990
Route 4	Sharon	1.05	1.69	No	October 22, 1992
Route 4	Harwinton	1.51	2.43	No	July 29, 1996
US 7	Sharon	4.29	6.90	No	July 26, 1990
US 7	Kent	10	16	No	October 17, 1990
US 7	Cornwall	3.56	5.73	No	January 3, 2002
US 7	Salisbury, Sharon, Canaan	10.26	16.51	No	March 2, 2002
Route 10	Farmington	1.1	1.8	No	April 13, 1999
Route 14	Windham, Scotland	4.43	7.13	No	January 13, 1999
Route 14A	Sterling	0.53	0.85	No	February 2, 1995
Route 15	New Canaan, Greenwich, Trumbull, Stamford, Westport, Stratford, Norwalk, Fairfield	37.27	59.98	Yes	January 28, 1993
Route 17	Durham	1.42	2.29	No	June 26, 2001
Route 27	Stonington, Groton	0.83	1.34	No	August 9, 2004
Route 30	Tolland	0.14	0.23	No	September 26, 2018
Route 33	Wilton	4.81	7.74	No	November 3, 1997
Route 41	Sharon	3.97	6.39	No	July 26, 1990
Route 41	Sharon	2.13	3.43	No	October 22, 1992
Route 41	Sharon	2.07	3.33	No	October 22, 1992
Route 41	Salisbury	3.19	5.13	No	December 20, 1993
Route 41	Salisbury	4.8	7.7	No	December 20, 1993
US 44	Pomfret	2.15	3.46	Yes	April 15, 1991
US 44	Norfolk	0.34	0.55	No	May 13, 1996
Route 45	Washington	0.56	0.90	No	June 8, 2010
Route 45	Warren, Washington	1.59	2.56	No	December 26, 1996
Route 49	North Stonington, Voluntown	10.86	17.48	No	February 2, 1995
Route 49	Sterling, Voluntown	7.61	12.25	No	February 2, 1995
Route 53	Redding	2.02	3.25	No	December 18, 1992
Route 58	Easton	3.14	5.05	No	May 6, 1994
Route 63	Litchfield	2.43	3.91	No	January 4, 2002
Route 63	Litchfield	0.95	1.53	No	January 4, 2002
Route 67	Roxbury	0.87	1.40	No	November 14, 1993
Route 67	Roxbury	2.9	4.7	No	August 3, 1996
Route 69	Burlington	3.17	5.10	No	March 26, 2013
Route 74	Tolland	0.84	1.35	No	September 26, 2018
Route 74	Tolland	2.15	3.46	No	September 26, 2018
Route 75	Suffield	4.3	6.9	No	February 23, 2001
Route 77	Guilford	11.56	18.60	No	May 3, 1991
Route 77	Durham	2.29	3.69	No	June 26, 2001
Route 80	Madison	1.96	3.15	No	December 17, 2010
Route 82	East Haddam, Haddam	0.29	0.47	No	February 17, 2004
Route 97	Pomfret	4.45	7.16	No	April 11, 2001
Route 109	Washington	3.31	5.33	No	March 9, 2017
Route 115	East Haddam	1.51	2.43	No	February 17, 2004
Route 118	Harwinton	0.1	0.16	No	July 29, 1996
Route 118	Litchfield	2.76	4.44	No	January 4, 2002
Route 136	Westport	1.86	2.99	No	July 6, 2016
Route 146	Branford, Guilford	12.16	19.57	No	May 29, 1990
Route 148	Lyme	1.6	2.6	No	June 5, 2003
Route 149	East Haddam	2.31	3.72	No	February 17, 2004
Route 154	Haddam	9.1	14.6	No	January 13, 1994
Route 154	Old Saybrook	6.1	9.8	No	December 17, 2004
Route 156	Lyme, East Haddam	6.24	10.04	No	June 5, 2003
Route 160	Glastonbury	1.02	1.64	No	January 18, 1991
Route 164	Preston	2.76	4.44	No	February 1, 1994
Route 169	Canterbury, Pomfret, Lisbon, Brooklyn	20.03	32.24	Yes	April 15, 1991
Route 169	Woodstock, Pomfret	2.63	4.23	Yes	April 15, 1991
Route 169	Woodstock	6.93	11.15	Yes	April 15, 1991
Route 171	Woodstock	0.63	1.01	Yes	April 15, 1991
Route 179	Canton	0.51	0.82	No	February 25, 1991
Route 179	Burlington	1.96	3.15	No	March 26, 2013
Route 181	Barkhamsted	1.78	2.86	No	January 10, 1995
Route 183	Colebrook	3.09	4.97	No	May 24, 1995
Route 195	Tolland	0.36	0.58	No	September 26, 2008
US 202	New Hartford	5.19	8.35	No	August 12, 1991
US 202	Litchfield	0.48	0.77	No	January 4, 2002
US 202	Washington	2.78	4.47	No	June 8, 2010
Route 203	Windham	1.7	2.7	No	January 13, 1999
Route 219	Barkhamsted, New Hartford	2.64	4.25	No	January 10, 1995
Route 219	New Hartford	0.25	0.40	No	September 24, 1998
Route 234	Stonington	3.16	5.09	No	February 20, 1990
Route 244	Pomfret	3.06	4.92	No	February 21, 2003
Route 254	Litchfield	3.98	6.41	No	January 4, 2002
Route 272	Norfolk	6.23	10.03	No	May 13, 1996
Route 272	Norfolk	2.72	4.38	No	May 13, 1996
Route 317	Roxbury	0.4	0.64	No	November 14, 1990
Route 318	Barkhamsted	1.67	2.69	No	January 10, 1995
431	Lyme	0.26	0.42	No	June 5, 2003
431	East Haddam	0.54	0.87	No	July 24, 2003
478	Washington	3.08	4.96	No	December 26, 1996
478	Warren	2.22	3.57	No	December 26, 1996
478	Kent	0.78	1.26	No	December 6, 2000
565	Canton	0.56	0.90	No	February 25, 1991
