= List of Hartford County towns and villages =

This is a list of towns and villages in Hartford County, Connecticut, United States.

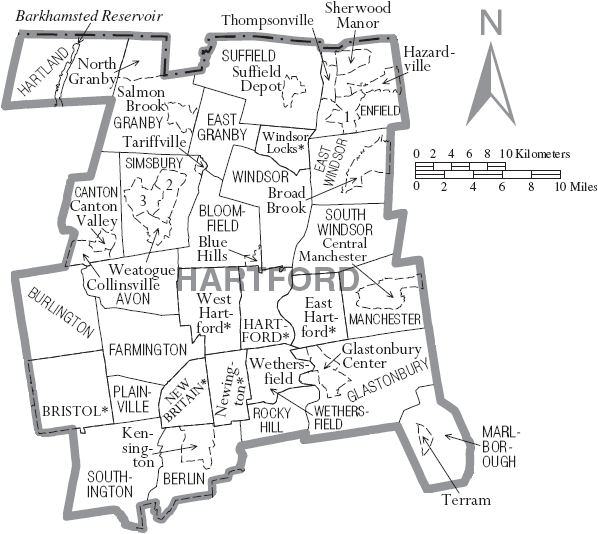
Map of Hartford County, Connecticut showing cities, towns, boroughs, and CDPs

== A ==
- Addison
- Alsop Corner
- Avon (Town)
- Avon Park North
- Avon Park South

== B ==
- Bahre Corner
- Bell Air
- Bellin Terrace
- Bensted Corner
- Berlin (Town)
- Birchwood
- Bishop's Corner (a neighborhood of West Hartford)
- Bloomfield (Town)
- Blue Hills (a village of Bloomfield)
- Brainerd Park
- Breakneck
- Bristol (City)
- Broad Acres
- Broad Brook
- Brookhaven Village
- Buckingham
- Buckland
- Bull Run Corner
- Burlington (Town)
- Burnham
- Burnside

== C ==
- Canton (Town)
- Canton Center
- Canton Valley
- Carroll Corners
- Case Corner
- Chatsworth Village
- Cherry Park
- Children's Village of the Hartford Orphan Asylum
- Coachlight Village
- Collinsville (a village of Canton)
- Colonial Mobile Home Park
- Corbin Heights Housing
- Cottage Farms
- Cottage Grove
- Cotton Hollow
- Crowleys Corner

== D ==
- Dutch Point Colony

== E ==
- East Berlin
- East Bristol
- East Farmington Heights
- East Glastonbury
- East Granby (Town)
- East Hartford (Town)
- East Hartford Gardens
- East Hartland (a village of Hartland)
- East Plymouth
- East Side
- East Windsor Hill
- Ebbs Corner
- Edgewood
- Elm Hill
- Elmwood (a neighborhood of West Hartford)
- Elmwood Acres
- Enfield (Town)

== F ==
- Farmingdale Village
- Farmington (Town)
- Farmington Station
- Farnhams
- Fernridge Place
- Firetown
- Five Points
- Flax Hill Elderly Housing
- Floydville
- Foote Corners
- Forbes Village
- Forest Village
- Forestville (a section of Bristol)
- Four Corners

== G ==
- Glastonbury (Town)
- Glastonbury Center
- Glenwood Homes
- Goodrichville
- Granbrook Park
- Granby (Town)
- Green Manor Village
- Griswoldville

== H ==
- Halladay Corner
- Hampsted
- Hartford (City)
- Hartland (Town)
- Hathewood
- Hayden
- Hazardville (a section of Enfield)
- Highland Park
- Higley Village
- Hilliardville
- Hockanum
- Hopewell
- Hoskins
- Huckleberry Hills Trails
- Hungary

== K ==
- Keeney Park
- Kensington (a section of Berlin)
- Kew Gardens
- Kings Corner

== L ==
- Lamson Corner
- Liberty Mobile Home Park
- Lovely Street
- Lydallville

== M ==
- Manchester (Town)
- Manchester Green
- Marion (a section of Southington)
- Marlborough (Town)
- Mayberry Village
- McKinley Park
- Meadowgate
- Mechanicsville
- Melrose
- Mill Pond Village
- Milldale (a section of Southington)
- Moravia Woods
- Mount Pleasant Housing

== N ==
- New Britain (City)
- Newington (Town)
- Newington Junction
- North Bloomfield
- North Canton
- North End
- North Granby (a village of Granby)
- North Hollow
- North Thompsonville

== O ==
- Oakland
- Oakland Gardens
- Oakland Hills
- Old Avon Village
- Orford Village
- Oxford Village

== P ==
- Parkville
- Pegville
- Pequabuck
- Pine Hill
- Pinnacle Heights Housing
- Plainville (Town)
- Plantsville (a section of Southington)
- Poquonock (a village of Windsor)
- Pratts Corner
- Prospect Heights

== R ==
- Rainbow
- Rising Corner
- River Glen
- Rivermead Mobile Home Park
- Rocky Hill (Town)
- Roland Heights

== S ==
- Salmon Brook
- Saybrooke Village
- Scantic
- Scitico
- Shaker Pines
- Sherwood Manor
- Silvermine Acres
- Simsbury (Town)
- Smith Tower Housing
- South Glastonbury
- South Side Park
- South Wethersfield
- South Windsor (Town)
- Southington (Town)
- Southwood Acres
- Spoonville
- Spring Village
- Stillmans Corner
- Stowe Village Housing Project
- Suffield (Town)
- Suffield Depot (a village of Suffield)

== T ==
- Tariffville (a village of Simsbury)
- Tariffville Center
- Taylor Town
- Terramuggus (a village of Marlborough)
- The Gables
- Thompsonville (a village of Enfield)
- Thralltown
- Timber Village
- Tootin' Hills
- Tudor Village
- Turkey Hill

== U ==
- Unionville

== V ==
- Victory Heights

== W ==
- Wapping
- Wapping Mews Elderly Housing
- Warehouse Point
- Weatogue (a village of Simsbury)
- Welles Village
- Wells Quarter Village
- West Avon
- West District
- West Granby (a village of Granby)
- West Hartford (Town)
- West Hartland (a village of Hartland)
- West Hill
- West Simsbury (a village of Simsbury)
- West Suffield
- Westfield Heights
- Westmoor Park
- Wethersfield
- Whigville
- Whitings Corner
- Wilson (a village of Windsor)
- Windmill Springs
- Windsor (Town)
- Windsor Locks (Town)
- Windsorville
- Wintonbury Hill
- Woodland
