= Bertha Colton =

American politician (died 1959)

Member of the Connecticut House of Representatives from Granby
- In office 1947–1951 Serving with Philip E. Devnew
- Preceded by: Tudor F. Holcomb; Leon D. Goddard
- Succeeded by: Francis B. Allen; A. Chandler Ryder

Personal details
- Born: Bertha Wilcox; 1895 or 1896 West Granby, Connecticut, U.S.
- Died: November 26, 1959 (aged 63) Granby, Connecticut, U.S.
- Party: Republican
- Spouse: Walter G. Colton
- Children: 3

Bertha Colton (died November 26, 1959) was an American politician who served in the Connecticut House of Representatives from 1947 to 1951, representing the town of Granby as a Republican.

== Political career ==
Colton was elected to the Connecticut House of Representatives in 1946 and served two terms representing the town of Granby as a Republican. She served both terms alongside fellow Republican Philip E. Dandrow and was a member of the Education Committee.

== Personal life ==
Colton was born in West Granby, Connecticut. She was married to Walter G. Colton, who served in the Connecticut House of Representatives from 1939 to 1941. They had three children.

Colton died in Granby, Connecticut, on November 26, 1959, at age 63.
