= Amasa Holcomb =

American manufacturer of surveying instruments and telescopes

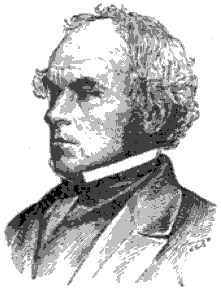
- Born: June 18, 1787; Southwick, Massachusetts
- Died: March 1875 (aged 87)
- Spouse: Gillett Kendall (m. 1808)
- Parent(s): Elijah Holcomb Junior, d. 1841; Lucy Holcomb, b. 1767 d. 1800
- Relatives: Paternal grandparents: Elijah Holcomb and Violet Cornish; Maternal grandparents: Silas Holcomb and Mary Post

Amasa Holcomb (1787–1875) was an American farmer, surveyor, civil engineer, businessman, politician, and manufacturer of surveying instruments and telescopes. From instruments he made he observed the total solar eclipse of June 16, 1806. He made astronomical computations from his observations and published almanacs for the partial solar eclipses of 1807 and 1808 from his work. An asteroid, 45512 Holcomb, was named after him.

== Early life ==
Holcomb was born on June 18, 1787. Holcomb grew up in a town with three names in two states as a young child, but he never changed his residence due to border disputes and resolutions. (Note: The area known as "the jog" was called Simsbury, Connecticut, prior to 1768. Later his birthplace was renamed Granby, Connecticut.) The town kept this name until 1804 when the boundary between the states of Connecticut and Massachusetts was placed further south, and his birth town became known as Southwick, Massachusetts, where he grew up.

Holcomb was Elijah Holcomb Jr. and Lucy Holcomb and a descendant of the immigrant Thomas Holcomb. His paternal grandfather, also named Elijah, was the son of Nathaniel Holcomb III. Holcomb's maternal grandfather was Silas Holcomb, son of Judah Holcomb I and grandson of Nathaniel Holcomb II. This grandfather married Mary Post; a daughter born in 1767 was Lucy Holcomb, Holcomb's mother.

Holcomb studied from books that had been owned by his uncle Abijah, who was lost at sea.

== Mid-life ==
Holcomb built a telescope in 1806 and could observe the total solar eclipse of June 16, 1806. He made astronomical computations in the four minutes he could see the stars during the eclipse. He published an almanac for 1807 and 1808 from his computations.

== Personal life ==
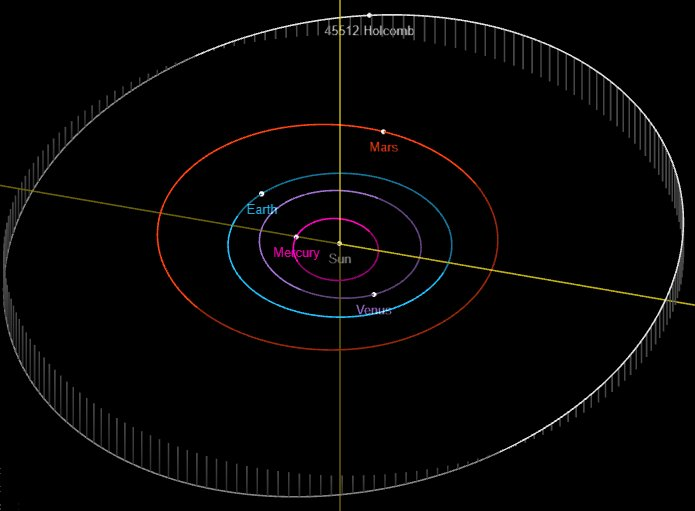
Holcomb asteroid (45512) orbit path

Asteroid 45512 Holcomb, discovered by astronomers with the Catalina Sky Survey in 2000, was named after him. The official naming citation was published by the Minor Planet Center on November 8, 2019 (M.P.C. 118220).

== Holcomb's telescopes ==
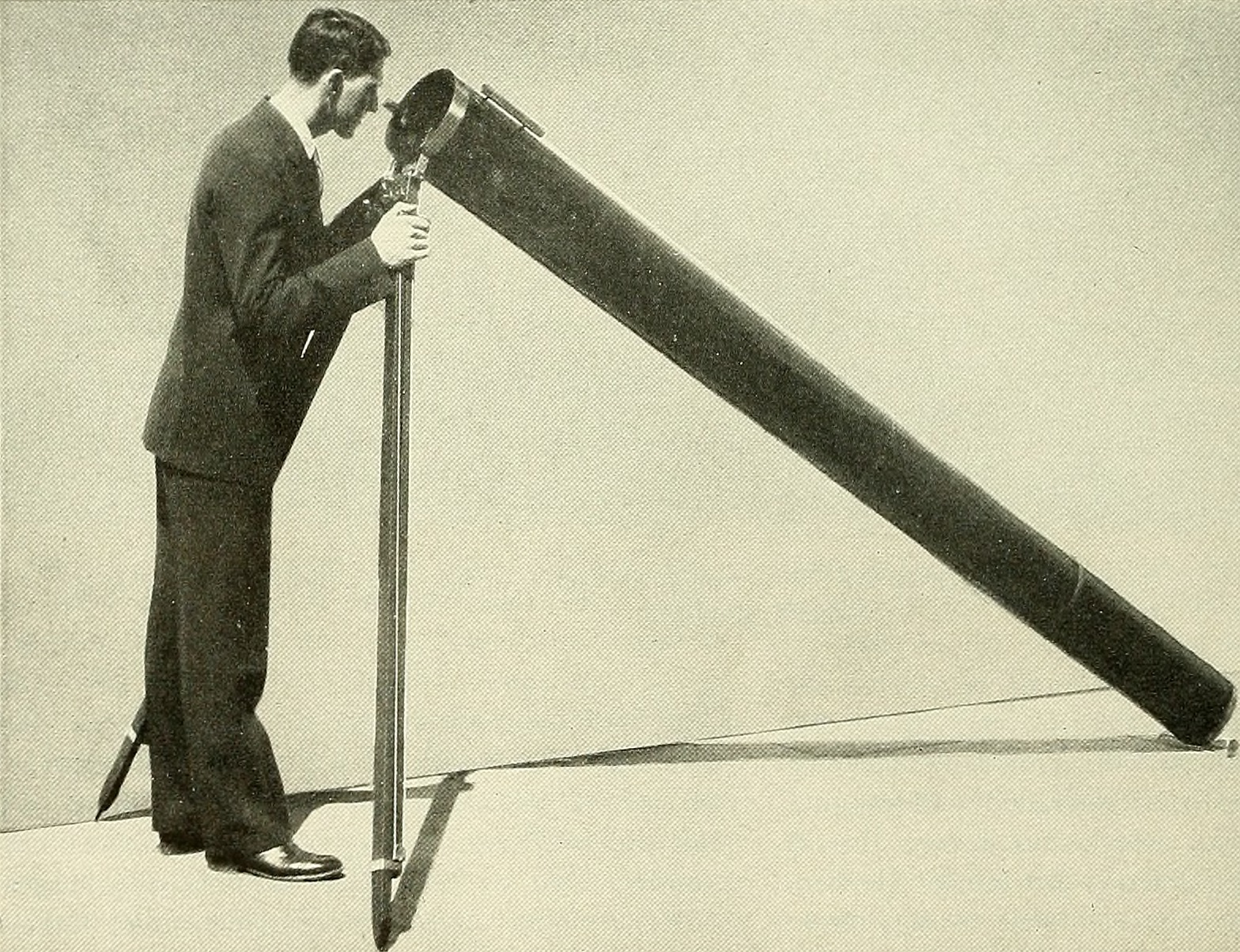
Amasa Holcomb reflecting telescope

The first reflecting telescope Holcomb made to order was for John A. Fulton of Chillicothe, Ohio, in about 1826. It was fourteen feet (4.3 m) long with a ten-inch (254 mm) aperture and six eye pieces and a magnification from 90 to 960 times. He fabricated and manufactured telescopes in earnest soon after, probably around 1826.

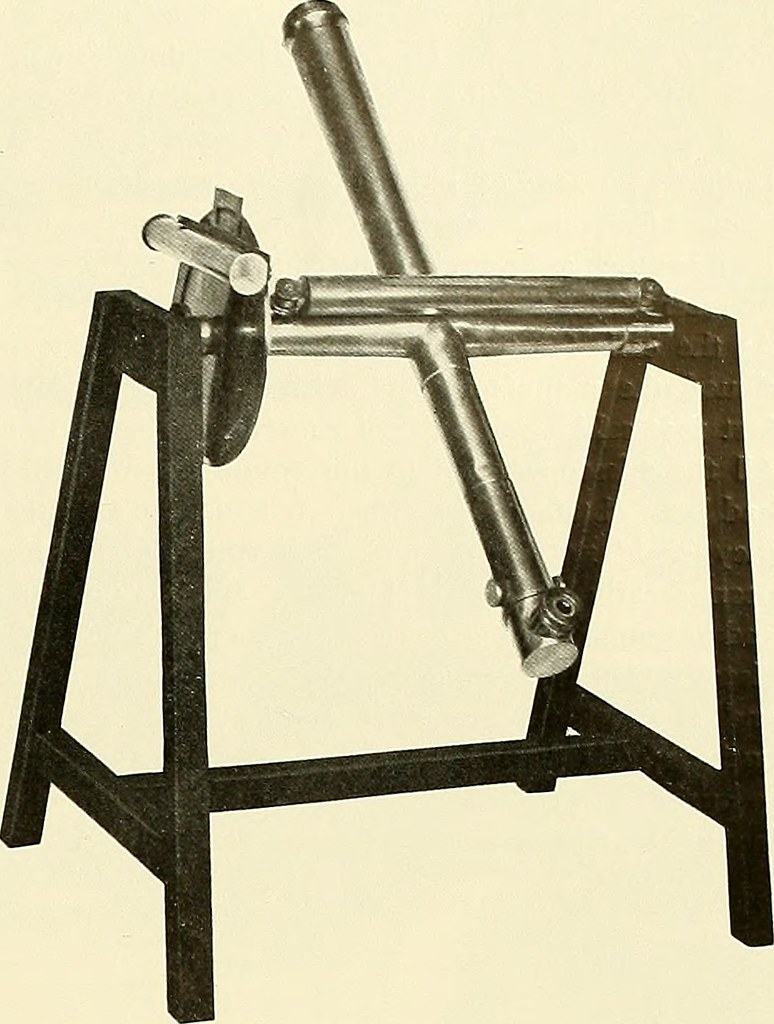
Transit telescope made by Amasa Holcomb

In 1830, Holcomb took an achromatic telescope to Professor Benjamin Silliman at Yale University in New Haven. After inspecting it, the professor ordered one for the university and published an article about it in the American Journal of Science.

In 1834, on the recommendation of The Franklin Institute, the City of Philadelphia awarded him the John Scott Award.

== Legacy ==
Holcomb's descendants donated two telescopes manufactured by Holcomb to the Smithsonian in 1933. Until then, they had been in the family at Southwick, Massachusetts. These were,

- Herschelian reflector nine feet (2.7 m) long with an eight-inch (203 mm) aperture that had been displayed in 1835 at The Franklin Institute.
- Transit telescope, refractor, twenty-one inches (530 mm) in length and mounted on a fourteen-inch (360 mm) cross tube with a graduated marked circle, but missing the base.

== Sources ==
- Loomis, Elias (1856). The Recent Progress of Astronomy, Especially the United States. Chicago, Illinois: Harper & Brothers.
- King, W. James (1962). The Development of Electrical Technology in the 19th Century. Washington, D.C.: Smithsonian Institution.
