= Maltbie =

Maltbie may refer to:

== Surname ==
- Milo R. Maltbie (1871–1962), American economist and public utility regulator
- Roger Maltbie (born 1951), American golfer
- Theodore Mills Maltbie (1842–1915), American lawyer and politician
- William M. Maltbie (1880–1961), American lawyer and judge

== Given name ==
- Maltbie Davenport Babcock (1858–1901), American clergyman and writer
