= Higley =

Higley is a surname. Notable people with the surname include:

- Brewster Higley (1823–1911), otolaryngologist who became famous for writing "The Western Home"
- Dena Higley (born 1958), American television soap opera writer who lives in Los Angeles, California
- Harvey V. Higley (1892–1986), Ansul Chemical Company president (1938–48) and chairman of the board
- Mark Higley, American politician from Vermont
- Samuel Higley (1680-1737), Blacksmith and creator of the “Higley coppers”

== See also ==
- Higley, Arizona, unincorporated community in Maricopa County, Arizona, United States
- Higley Flow State Park, located in the township of Colton in St. Lawrence County, New York in the USA
- Higley High School, high school in Gilbert, Arizona, USA
- Higley Creek, a previous name for Highly Creek in Missouri
- Higley (band), an American pop-punk band
