= Holcomb Observatory and Planetarium =

Observatory and planetarium in Indianapolis, Indiana, US

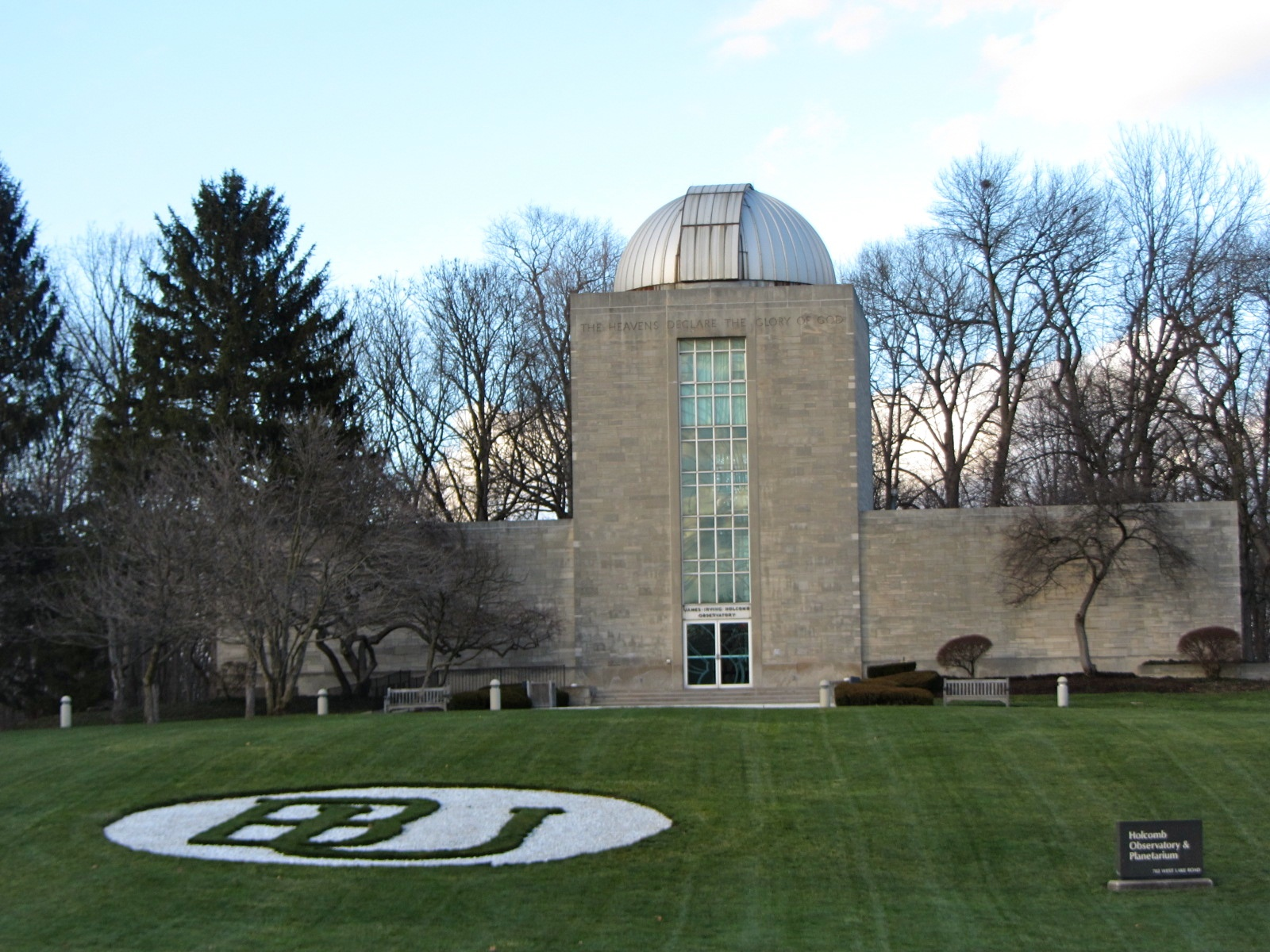
- Holcomb Observatory and Planetarium in 2012
- Interactive map of the Holcomb Observatory and Planetarium area

General information
- Status: Open
- Type: Observatory
- Location: 4600 Sunset Avenue, Indianapolis, IN, United States
- Coordinates: 39°50′29″N 86°10′17″W
- Groundbreaking: 1953
- Completed: October, 1954
- Opened: November 5, 1954
- Cost: $325,000
- Owner: Butler University

Height
- Height: 50 ft (15 m)

Website
- www.butler.edu/holcomb-observatory/

Holcomb Observatory and Planetarium is a part of Butler University in Indianapolis, Indiana.

== First observatory ==
In 1888, the university built its first observatory when the campus was located on the east side of Indianapolis. The observatory housed a 6-inch (150 mm) telescope that was purchased from the estate of Robert McKim of Madison, Indiana that year. The lens for the telescope was manufactured by Alvan Clark & Sons in 1883 and was originally part of McKim's personal observatory located near his home in Madison.

When the campus moved to the north side of Indianapolis in 1928, the old observatory on the Irvington campus was torn down. The telescope was reconditioned in the 1930s and remounted on the new campus, but sat unused until 1945.

== Construction ==
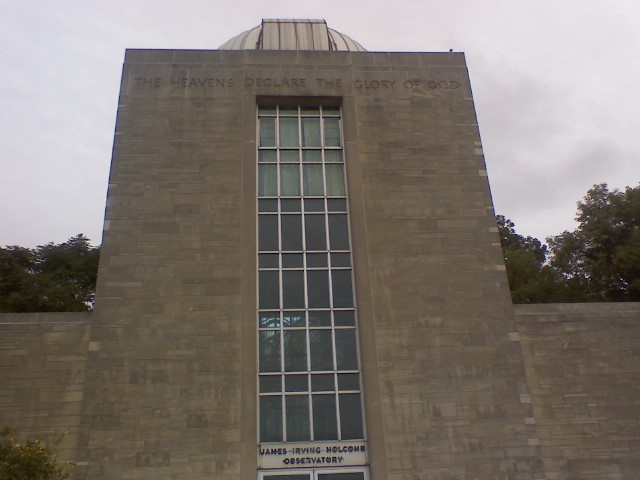
The inscription reads "The Heavens Declare The Glory Of God"

In 1953, benefactor James Irving Holcomb and his wife gave $325,000 for the construction of an observatory as the centennial gift to the university. In October 1954, a 38-inch (970 mm) reflecting telescope was installed by J. W. Fecker, Inc. The telescope was, and still is, the largest in the state of Indiana. The observatory was built on a hill on the north end of the Butler University campus.

The observatory's wooden dome was replaced with its current aluminum dome in the early 1980s. The telescope itself was first refurbished over several years beginning in 1995 by AB Engineering of Fort Wayne, Indiana at a cost of approximately $120,000.

== Recent upgrades ==
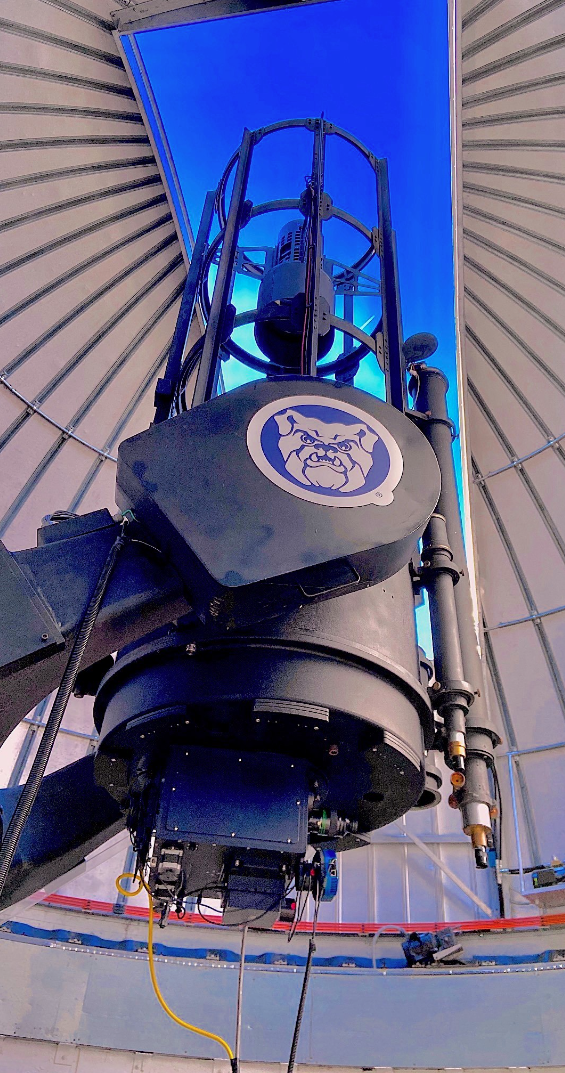
Upgraded Holcomb Observatory 0.95-meter Casssegrain telescope. The telescope can be operated remotely from any location.

Since then two major upgrades to the observatory have taken place. First, in 2015, the telescope underwent a $425,000 upgrade by Astronomical Consultants and Equipment to greatly improve its optics, operation, and research ability. This upgrade changed the optics of the telescope from an F16 to an F6.3. This change in focal ratio in combination with a new FLI CCD camera increased the effective imaging area of the telescope by a factor of 10, giving the imager a field of view of 18 arcminutes. The telescope can be used remotely by observers from anywhere in the world, alleviating the need to be on campus when conducting research. Research conducted using the Holcomb telescope includes asteroids, eclipsing variable stars, exoplanets, and long period variables in globular star clusters.

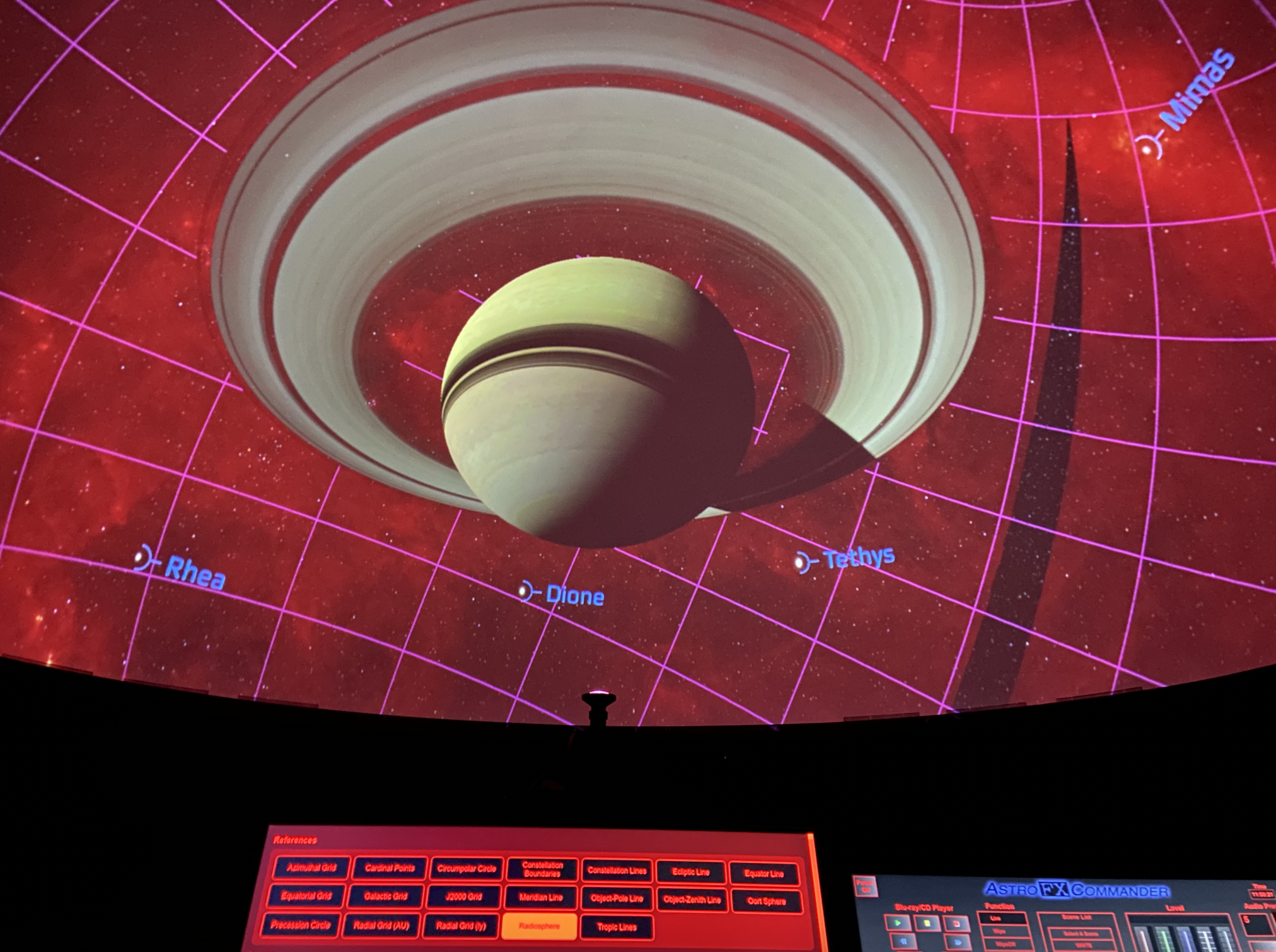
The planetarium with its recently installed Lambda projector.

Second, In early 2018 the planetarium had its old analog Spitz AP3 star projector replaced with a digital fulldome digital projector. A new Digitarium Kappa projector was installed with more than 4 million pixels onto the dome of the planetarium which gives visitors a fully immersive 3D experience in addition to nicely rendering the night sky. Even more recently, in late 2022, the Kappa projector was replaced with a Digitarium Lamda projector. This new laser-phosphor illumination system provides bright, rich colors and 225% more pixels on the dome than the Kappa. It can show the sky as it was millions of years into the past and future. The new Kappa projector also allows for flight to the Moon and planets, and through and out of the Milky Way galaxy.

Further upgrades include the installation of interactive touch screens in the lobby that allow visitors to explore the Solar System and other information concerning the observatory and space science. Opposite the planetarium and across the lobby, the 50-seat classroom was gutted and renovated during the summer of 2022. The classroom is full mediated and used for both Butler University course instruction, outreach, and special events. The classroom looks out into the Holcomb Gardens and is typically used 35 hours per week. The observatory is now better than ever and the combination of these upgrades provides students, faculty, and visitors with a unique astronomical learning experience that is hard to find elsewhere.

Although the equipment has been upgraded, the observatory building retains its 1950s charm. The lobby has a terrazzo floor with inset zodiac symbols, a star burst chandelier, and tall frosted windows. The telescope retains its classic 1950s look, and riding piggyback on the main telescope is Butler University's first telescope dating back to the 1880s.

== See also ==
- Amasa Holcomb
- List of observatories
- List of planetariums
