= Salmon Brook =

Salmon Brook may refer to:

- Salmon Brook, Connecticut, United States, a census-designated place in the town of Granby
- Salmon Brook (Merrimack River tributary), a stream in Massachusetts and New Hampshire in the United States

== See also ==
- Salmons Brook, a stream in the London Borough of Enfield, United Kingdom
