= Samuel Hayes II House =

Historic house in Connecticut, United States

- Samuel II Hayes House
- U.S. National Register of Historic Places
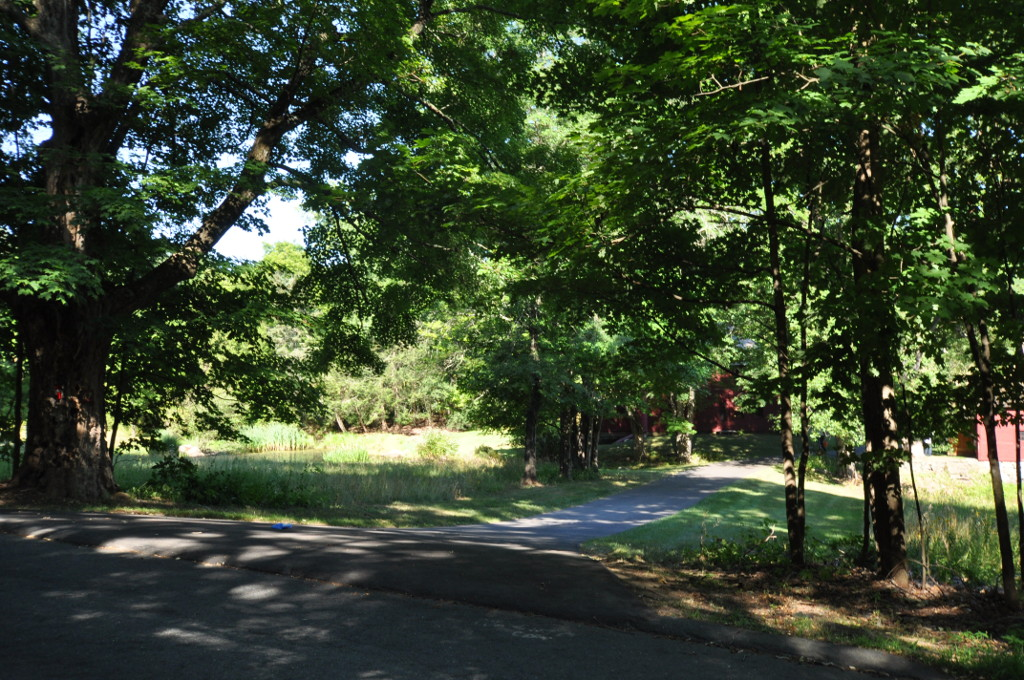

- Location within Connecticut Location within the United States
- Location: 67 Barndoor Hills Road, Granby, Connecticut
- Coordinates: 41°56′42″N 72°49′6″W
- Area: 9 acres (3.6 ha)
- Built: 1769
- Built by: Hayes, Samuel, II
- Architectural style: Colonial, Georgian, New England Colonial
- NRHP reference No.: 92000390
- Added to NRHP: April 27, 1992

The Samuel Hayes II House is a historic house at 67 Barndoor Hill Road in Granby, Connecticut. Probably built in 1769, it is an extremely rare example in the Connecticut River valley of a middle-class colonial house with a hip roof. It was listed on the National Register of Historic Places in 1992.

== Description and history ==
The Samuel Hayes II House stands in a rural-residential area southwest of Granby's village center, set well back on the west side of Barndoor Hill Road a short way north of Reed Hill Road. It is a two-story wood-frame structure, with a steeply pitched hip roof, central chimney, and clapboarded exterior. The main facade is five bays wide, with the main entrance in the central bay but off-center. The interior of the house has many original features, including wide floorboards, strap hinges on doors, and trim elements. The chimney stack is unusually for the region set at a 45° angle, with a large cooking fireplace in the basement (with arched oven), and fireplace openings facing each of the principal chambers in the main and second floors.

The house's exact construction date is not known, but is conjectured to be about 1769. It was built by Samuel Hayes II, a prominent local leader who led militia forces during the French and Indian War. The house bears some similarity of style to another house (extensively altered in the 19th century) built in what is now East Granby in 1769 for one of Hayes' officers. These two houses and one other in Windsor are the only known examples of period housing that have steeply pitched hip roofs on what are basically middle-class residences.

== See also ==
- National Register of Historic Places listings in Hartford County, Connecticut
