= East Granby Historic District =

Historic district in Connecticut, United States

- U.S. National Register of Historic Places
- U.S. Historic district
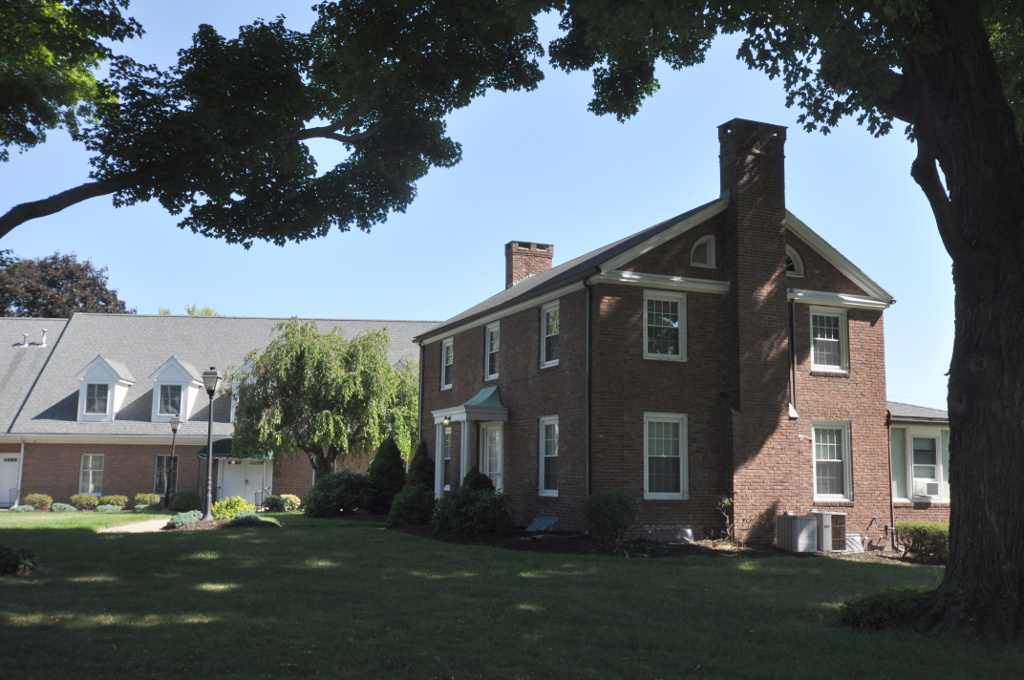

- Location within Connecticut Location within the United States
- Location: Church and East Streets, Nicholson and Rainbow Roads, North Main, School and South Main Streets, East Granby, Connecticut
- Coordinates: 41°56′32″N 72°43′28″W
- Area: 1,320 acres (530 ha)
- Built: 1987
- Architect: Multiple
- Architectural style: Colonial Revival, Colonial, Greek Revival
- NRHP reference No.: 88001318
- Added to NRHP: August 25, 1988

The East Granby Historic District encompasses a predominantly rural and agricultural area of the town of East Granby, Connecticut. Extending northward from the town center and covering some two square miles, it includes one of the state's highest concentrations of surviving 18th and early 19th-century farmsteads, and a relatively little-altered landscape. The district was listed on the National Register of Historic Places in 1988.

== Description and history ==
The town of East Granby, originally known as Turkey Hills, was settled in the early 18th century as part of Simsbury, was incorporated as part of Granby in 1786, and was separately incorporated in 1858. Throughout most of its history it has been an agricultural community, although there have been suburban development pressures beginning in the 20th century. Early settlers laid out strips of land along North and South Main Street, on which they lived and farmed, also engaging in other trades. It was a basically subsistence economy until the early 19th century, when more market-oriented agriculture began to take place. The town was bypassed by railroads, and had little industry, resulting in a slow pace of development. The town center has significant modern elements, but retains aspects of its early rural period, which are also part of the historic district.

The historic district is roughly centered on the town center, extending southward from the Suffield town line to about one mile south of the center. Most of this area is still in agriculture, and the area north of the center has a large concentration of late 18th and early-to-mid-19th century farmsteads. Most of the early farmsteads have either colonial Georgian, or later Federal and Greek Revival styles; later buildings tend to be vernacular, lacking Victorian ornamentation. There are two institutional buildings in the district: the stone Congregational Church, located in the town center, and a school building that was repurposed as a library. Most of the buildings are wood frame; only two houses are brick.

== See also ==
- National Register of Historic Places listings in Hartford County, Connecticut
