= Nathaniel Holcomb III House =

Historic house in Connecticut, United States

- Nathaniel Holcomb III
- U.S. National Register of Historic Places
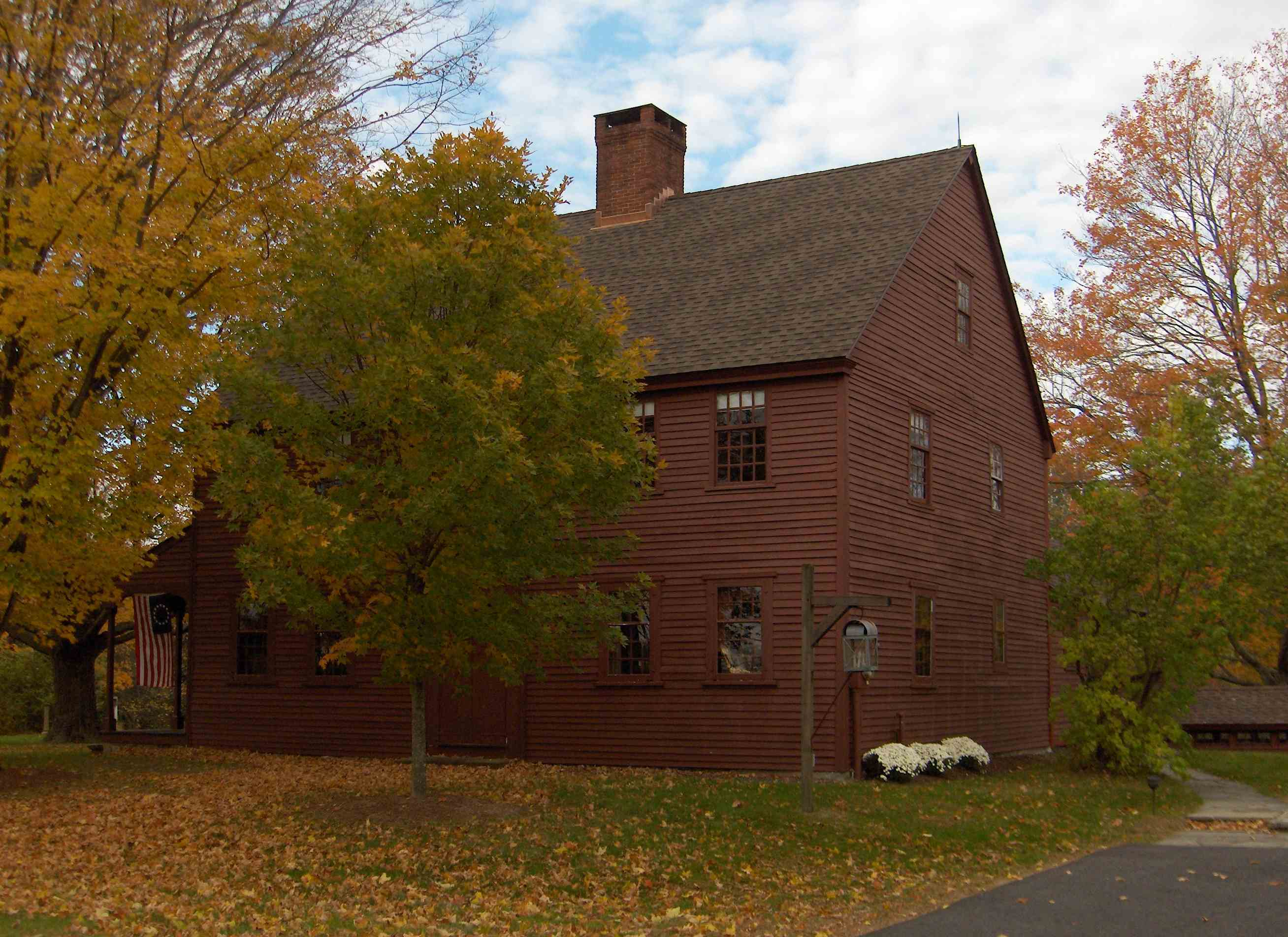

- Location within Connecticut Location within the United States
- Location: 45 Bushy Hill Road, Granby, Connecticut
- Coordinates: 41°57′0″N 72°48′40″W
- Area: 5 acres (2.0 ha)
- Built: 1720
- NRHP reference No.: 82004486
- Added to NRHP: April 29, 1982

The Nathaniel Holcomb III House, also known as the Isaac Porter House, is a historic house at 45 Bushy Hill Road in Granby, Connecticut. It is locally significant as the residence of Nathaniel Holcomb III, a prominent resident, and as a well-preserved example of early 18th century residential construction.

== Holcomb family ==
In 1679, John Talcott had a plan to "people" the Salmon Brook area. Only nine years earlier, the area, known as Massaco, had petitioned the colony and become the town of Simsbury. People were settling the central part of Simsbury and Talcott had plans to add settlers to the northern part of the town, known then as Salmon Brook (later to become Granby). He offered inducements to eleven families to relocate to Salmon Brook. Nathaniel Holcomb was not one of the eleven, as he was already living in the Salmon Brook area, thus becoming the first of the European settlers to the area.

Because of his experience in King Philip's War, Holcomb was asked to become one of the leaders of the "train band" in Simsbury. Holcomb had a son, Nathaniel Junior, who also lived in the area. At one time he owed forty-one pounds to William Thrall of Windsor, which landed him in "gaol" when he could not play. Holcomb Junior "from thense breaking the gaol made him escape", but was tracked down by the sheriff.

A third-generation Holcomb, Nathaniel Holcomb III, built a house on Bushy Hill Road in 1720. At the time, he was 23 years old, had been married for three years, had one daughter, and another child on the way. Earlier, in 1716, the colony of Connecticut had appointed him lieutenant of the train band of "Symsbury".

== Later Owners ==
In 1733 Nathaniel Holcomb III sold the house with its barn and orchard and 110 1/2 acres of land, to Nathaniel Higley, half-brother of Samuel Higley. Subsequent owners included Captain Samuel Hayes, Jr. (1781-1795), Reverend Isaac Porter (1795-1835), Dr. Consider Morgan (1835-1844), and James Catlin Bartholomew (1851-1875), all prominent figures in the Granby community.

== The House ==
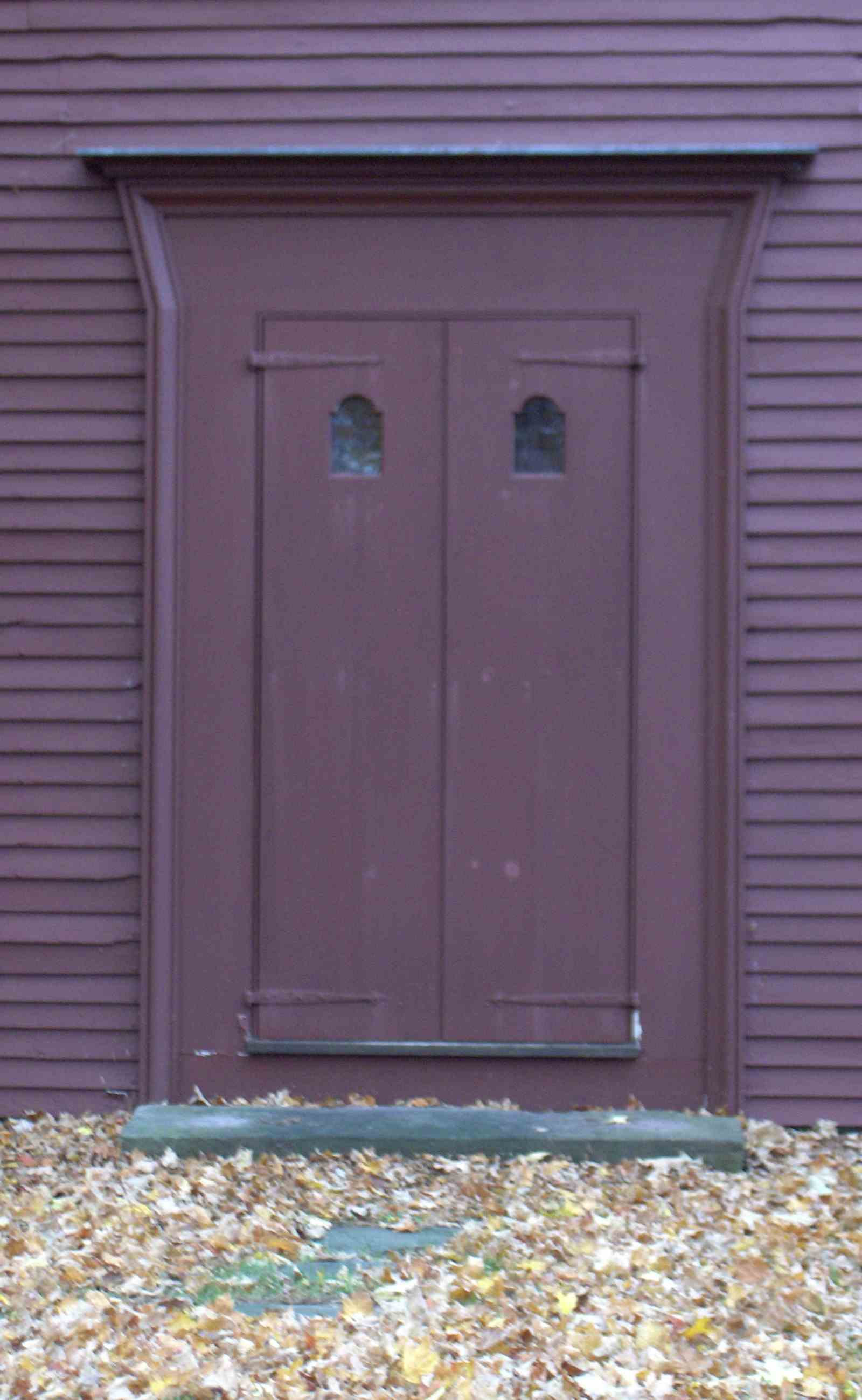
Front doors

The house was originally constructed as a lean-to or saltbox. Subsequent alteration were made, but the house has well-preserved interior and exterior details, including plasterwork, wood paneling, and original hardware. One distinctive feature of the house is a "funeral door". These doors open directly into a room, rather than a hallway, and are especially wide. This allows the "dignified" removal of a coffin, without the need to negotiate corners. Often, these doors were not used for any other purpose.

== See also ==
- National Register of Historic Places listings in Hartford County, Connecticut
