= Emily Clemens Pearson =

American novelist

Emily Clemens Pearson (1818–1900) was a 19th-century American writer of books primarily on the topic of slavery.

== Biography ==
Person was born in Granby, Connecticut, in July 1818. Her parents were Allen and Catherine Stillman Clements. Her mother's family included Abraham Pierson, who was the first president of Yale. Her father was a founder of the lending library and the Granby Social Literary Society. She entered Mount Holyoke College in 1837 in the college's first seminary class and attended one term without obtaining a degree. In January 1842, she was working as a governess at a plantation near Warsaw, Virginia called Mount Airy. She began writing for journals published by the Adventist Millerites in 1844, and later moved to Portland, Maine, where a publisher of the Millerite journal The Hope of Israel, John Pearson, was located. She is listed as co-editor with John and Charles Pearson, and she married Charles Pearson in 1846. They had eight children. It appears the marriage did not last because in the June 1880 census of Andover, Massachusetts, Emily was listed as a head of household three children living with her, and showed that Charles was married to someone else. She died on March 17, 1900, and was buried in Wildwood Cemetery in Winchester, Massachusetts.

== Writing ==
Her first book was the abolitionist tale Jamie Parker, the fugitive in 1851, followed by the anti-slavery themed book Cousin Franck's Household, or Scenes in the Old Dominion, published in the same year, 1852, as Harriet Beacher Stowe's Uncle Tom's Cabin. She published the book using the pseudonym Pocahontas. She continued to write, although with a gap of time during which she was mainly raising her children.

== Bibliography ==
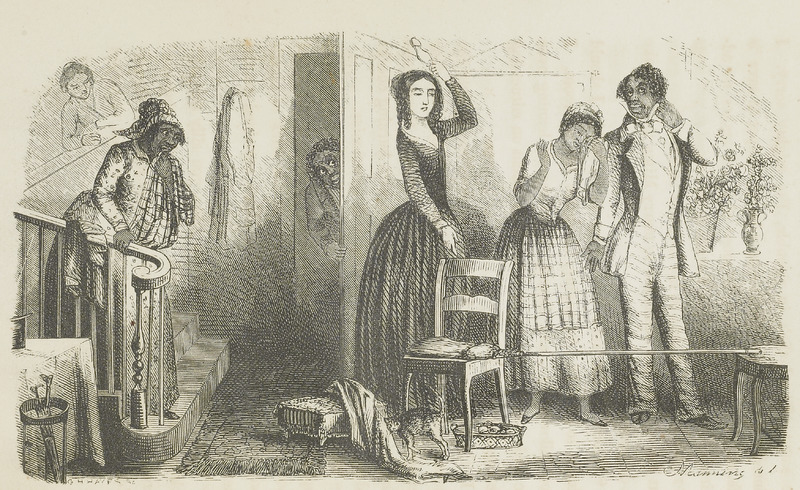
"Jumping the Broom" an informal wedding - from Cousin Francks Household

- Jamie Parker, the fugitive (Hartford : Brockett, Fuller, 1851)
- Uncle Franck's Household (1852) at Open Library
- Ruth's sacrifice, or, Life on the Rappahannock (1863)
- The rebel conscript (1864)
- The poor white, or, The rebel conscript (1864)
- Prince Paul : the freedman soldier (1867)
- The hope of Israel(journal, 1843- )
- Gutenberg, or, the world's benefactor : a book for boys on the art of printing (1870)
- Gutenberg, and the art of printing (1871)
- From cottage to castle : the boyhood, youth, manhood, private and public career of Gutenberg, and the story of his invention, the art of printing (1887)
- Madonna Hall : the story of our country's peril (1889) at Open Library
