= Allen's Cider Mill =

- U.S. National Register of Historic Places
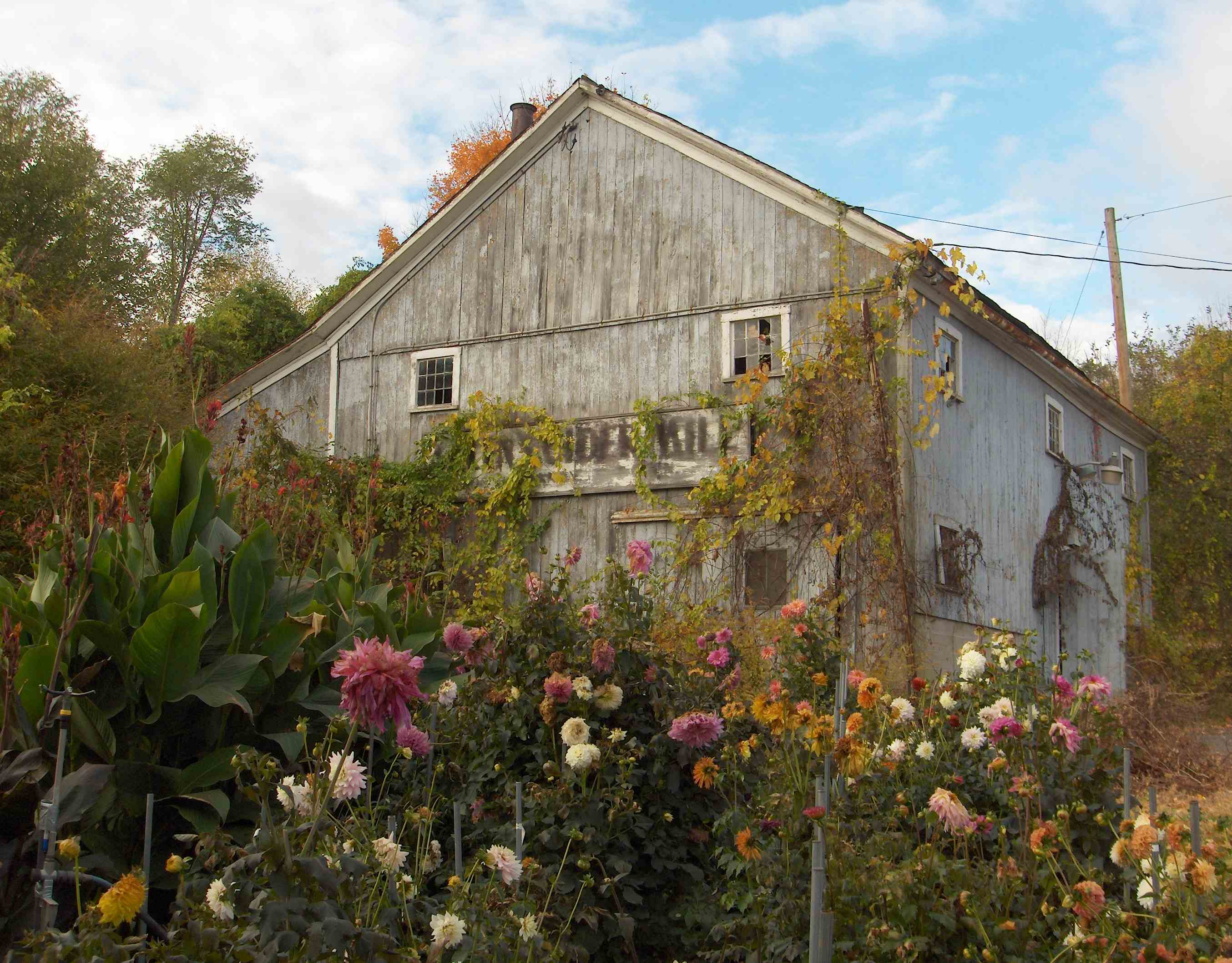

- Location within Connecticut Location within the United States
- Location: 7 Mountain Road, Granby, Connecticut
- Coordinates: 41°59′44″N 72°49′56″W
- Area: 1.5 acres (0.61 ha)
- Built: 1783
- NRHP reference No.: 92000389
- Added to NRHP: April 28, 1992

Allen's Cider Mill was a historic cider mill at 7 Mountain Road in Granby, Connecticut. With a history extending back to 1783, it was at the time of its listing on the National Register of Historic Places in 1992 one the few operational cider mills in the state of Connecticut. After a period of abandonment, the mill collapsed in 2019.

== Description and history ==
Allen's Cider Mill stood at the crossroads village of North Granby, on the south side of Mountain Road just west of its junction with Connecticut Route 189. It was a 2 1/2-story wood-frame structure, set close to the road, with a gable roof and a 1 1/2-story shed addition. Its exterior was finished in vertical board siding. The main facade was three bays wide, with doors in the center and right bays on the ground floor, and square multilight windows in the other bays. The placement of the central door was slightly off-center. The interior contained functional equipment for making cider that dated to the mid-20th century, and vestigial remains of older equipment, including a conveyor mechanism for transporting apples into the mill's hopper. The attic space had traces of plasterwork, indicating it was a finished space, which was probably used for aging cider.

The property on which the cider mill sat had been used for the making of cider since at least 1783, when Silas Cossitt opened a mill across the street. It operated until about 1857, a period when North Granby was one of Connecticut's major cider brandy producing centers. It is believed that the frame of Silas Cossitt's 18th-century house was used in the construction of this building. In the 1860s this building was constructed as an almshouse for the town's indigent population. It was originally located at the road junction, where the present post office stands, and was moved a short way west and converted into a dance hall in the 1870s. It was moved to its present location a few years later, and housed the local Grange chapter. It was adapted for use as a cider mill in 1899.

The mill's roof and upper floor collapsed and the south wall of the building fell down in August 2019.

== See also ==
- National Register of Historic Places listings in Hartford County, Connecticut
