= West Granby Historic District =

Historic district in Connecticut, United States

- U.S. National Register of Historic Places
- U.S. Historic district
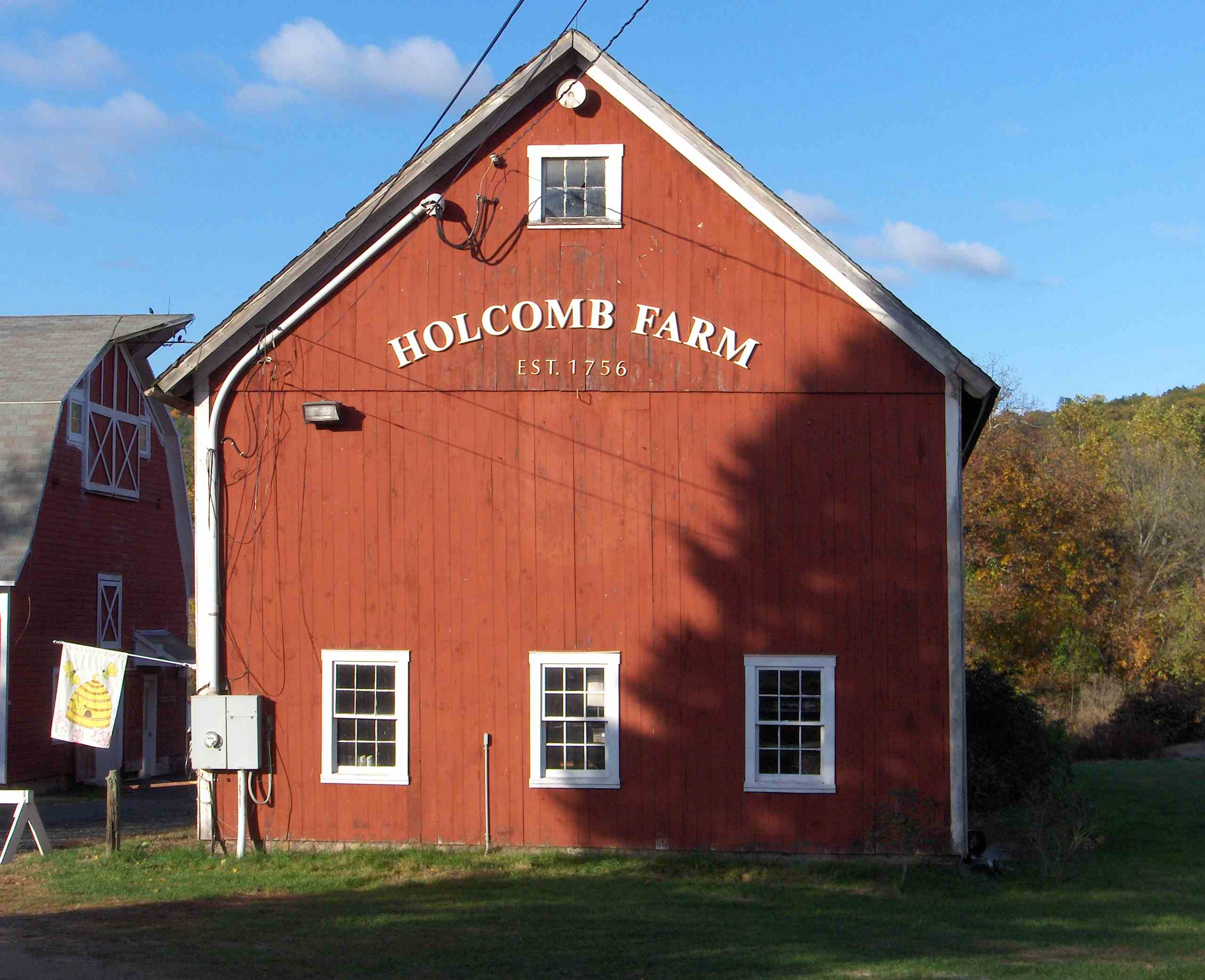

- Location within Connecticut Location within the United States
- Location: Broad Hill, Hartland, West Granby and Simsbury Roads and Day Street South, Granby, Connecticut
- Coordinates: 41°56′48″N 72°50′19″W
- Area: 750 acres (300 ha)
- Architectural style: Greek Revival, Colonial, Federal
- NRHP reference No.: 92000385
- Added to NRHP: May 1, 1992

The West Granby Historic District is a historic district in Granby, Connecticut, United States. It encompasses the historic village of West Granby, which extends along Simsbury Road between Firetown Road and Hartland Road. Although this area was settled in the 18th century, and has a few surviving buildings from that time, its most significant period of development was in the 19th century, when industry came to play a role in the area. The district was listed on the National Register of Historic Places in 1992.

== Description and history ==
The area that is now West Granby village was first settled in the early 18th century, and was largely agrarian, with a sawmill established on the West Branch Salmon Brook about 1742. In 1784, the water power of the brook was harnessed for a gristmill, carding mill, trip hammer facility, and gin distillery. By 1819 it was one of the town's most important economic centers. These small industries survived until approximately the time of the Civil War, after which they were unable to compete with similar businesses of larger scale in urban settings. The area experienced an agricultural revival in the early 20th century, when shade-grown tobacco was introduced.

The district is roughly linear in shape, extending along Simsbury Road from Hartland Road in the north to Firetown Road in the south, with several listed buildings on Hartland Road and West Granby Street. Most of the district's 113 buildings' primary buildings are residential, although there are many agricultural outbuildings and garages. The houses are typically in simple vernacular interpretations of architectural styles popular during their construction, and represent a cross-section of 19th-century and early 20th-century architecture. There are only a few minor instances of the village's industrial buildings that survive, and one church.

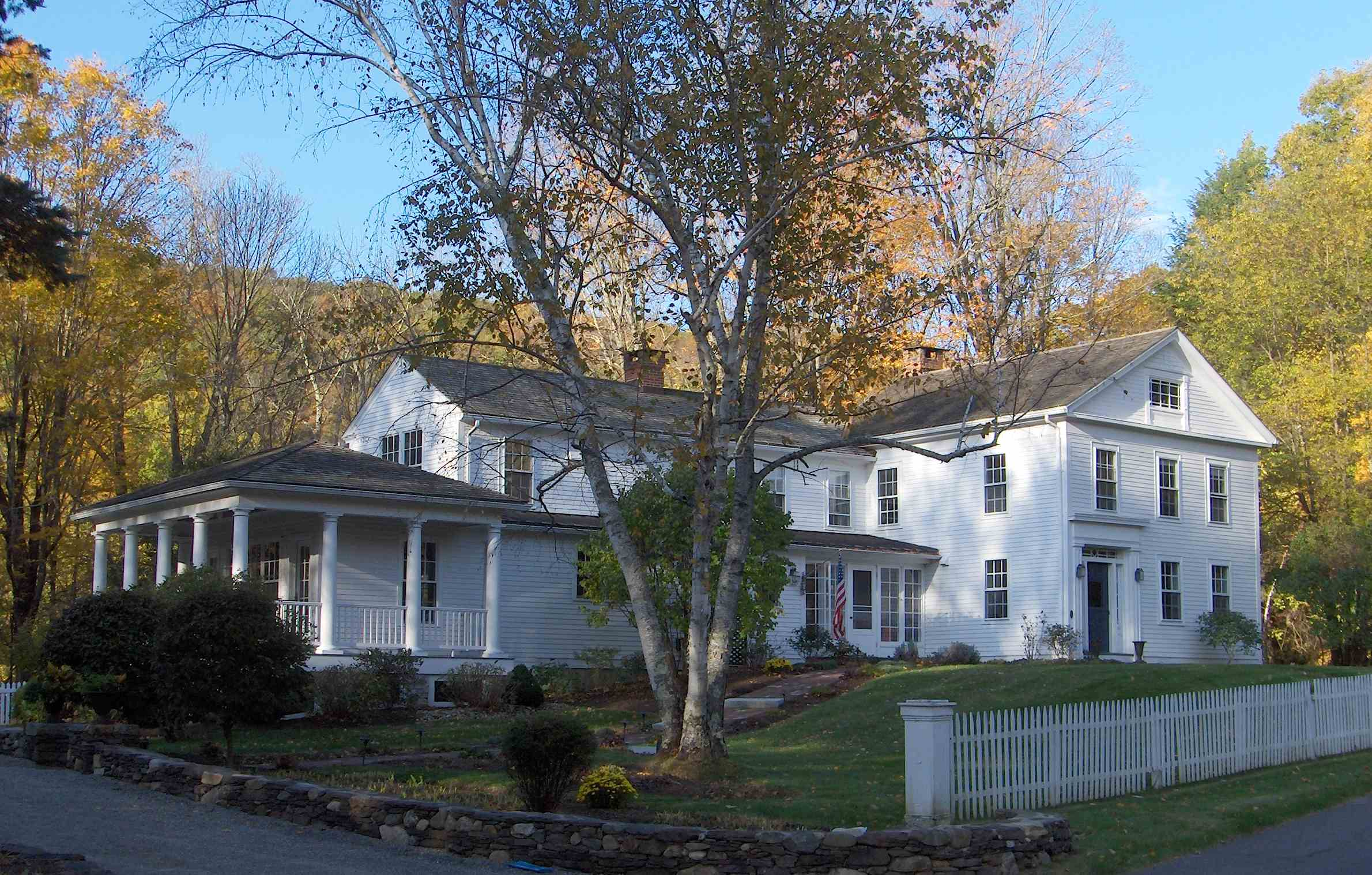
Pettibone/Cone House

== See also ==
- East Granby Historic District
- Granby Center Historic District
- National Register of Historic Places listings in Hartford County, Connecticut
