= William M. Maltbie =

American judge (1880–1961)

William Mills Maltbie (March 10, 1880 – December 15, 1961) was a lawyer, judge, and chief justice of the Connecticut Supreme Court.

Maltbie was born in Granby, Connecticut, on March 10, 1880. He was the son of Theodore Mills Maltbie (1842–1915), a prominent lawyer and politician who served three terms in the General Assembly and two in the state senate. William Maltbie was educated at Hartford Public High School, Yale (class of 1901), and Yale Law School (class of 1905). On graduation he was admitted to the bar and joined his father's practice in Hartford. He lived in Granby for all of his life, commuting to Hartford when necessary.

Maltbie served as one of Granby's representatives in the General Assembly in 1913. In 1914 he was appointed assistant state's attorney for Hartford County, where he met Hugh M. Alcorn, the state's attorney, who became a lifelong friend. While still assistant state's attorney, Maltbie served as Governor Marcus H. Holcomb's executive secretary from 1915 to 1917. In 1917 Governor Holcomb appointed him to the Superior Court. In 1925 he was raised to the Connecticut Supreme Court (then officially called the "Supreme Court of Errors") to succeed John P. Kellogg; in 1930 he became chief justice. He held that position until 1950 when he reached the judicial retirement age of 70. Following his retirement from the bench he served as a state referee and conducted two one-man grand jury investigations, in 1951 and 1954.

Maltbie published two editions of Connecticut Appellate Procedure during his lifetime; he completed a supplement to it in the last years of his life and it was published posthumously.

Maltbie did extensive work with the Boy Scouts of America (as a member of the national council), the YMCA, the Probation Association, the Connecticut Prison Association (long-time president), the Connecticut Opera Association (president), the Greater Hartford Federation of Churches (president), and other charitable and non-profit organizations.

He was awarded honorary degrees in law from many colleges and universities: Yale (1933), Trinity College (1934), Elon College (1941), Boston University (1942), and the University of Hartford (then "Hillyer College") (1955).

Maltbie married Mary L. Hamlin in 1917; their only son, Theodore Mills Maltbie, became a lawyer himself. Maltbie died on December 15, 1961, in Granby.
