= Theodore Mills Maltbie =

American politician

Theodore Mills Maltbie (born New York City, April 29, 1842; died Granby, Connecticut, November 13, 1915) was a lawyer and a member of both the Connecticut State Assembly and the Connecticut State Senate. He was a member of the Connecticut Constitutional Convention of 1902.

He was born Theodore Mills, the son of Pliny and Anna Fowler Mills; his father died in May 1842 and Theodore was adopted by Apphia Fowler Maltbie and Alonzo J. Maltbie, his maternal aunt and uncle.

His son William M. Maltbie was also a lawyer and became Chief Justice of the Connecticut Supreme Court.

== Sources ==
- Albert Nelson Marquis. Who's Who in New England. p. 715.
