= Higley copper =

Privately issued currency from colonial Connecticut

Obverse of a Highley copper depicting a deer and the inscription THE VALUE OF THREE PENCE

Higley coppers (or Granby coppers) were privately issued colonial American token coins produced by Samuel Higley and his brother John Higley of Granby, Connecticut between 1737 and 1739. The Higley coppers were some of the first coins produced in America.

== Background ==
There was a constant shortage of coinage in British America, with most trade and commerce being conducted through bartering and credit. Coins were still important in American commerce, however mostly foreign coins circulated, with the silver Spanish dollar and copper British halfpenny used commonly in transactions. Prior to the American Revolution, a small number of local private mints struck unofficial coins.

== History ==
Samuel Higley operated a copper mine on property he purchased in 1728 near what is now East Granby, Connecticut. Along with his brother John, he smelted the copper ore, designed and engraved the dies, and struck the tokens from pure copper. Four obverse types (eight dies) and four reverse types (five dies) in 15 combinations have been recorded by Freidus. They are found dated 1737, 1739, and without a date. Only a small number of coppers survive, making them extremely rare; Freidus records 63 examples. They are primarily heavily worn (grades Good to Fine). Since most Higley Coppers are double struck, researchers believe that the hammer method rather than a screw press was used to make them. These coins were approximately the size of a US Large cent.

== Obverse design ==
On three of the obverse types, there is a deer along with an inscription. Early versions were inscribed with "THE VALVE OF THREE PENCE", with a pointing hand. Later versions were inscribed "VALVE ME AS YOU PLEASE" or "VALUE ME AS YOU PLEASE" with a pointing hand, roman numeral three and a star. The change was likely due to the reluctance of local merchants to accept a threepence value for a coin no larger than an English halfpenny. The new inscription left it up to the local economy to set its own value. A fourth type includes a wheel surrounded by the legend "THE WHEELE GOES ROUND".

== Reverse design ==
Two reverse types include three hammers, topped with crowns. One has the inscription "CONNECTICVT 1737"; the other "I AM GOOD COPPER 1737". Two reverse types include a broadaxe. One is inscribed "J CUT MY WAY THROUGH"; the other "J CUT MY WAY THROUGH 1739".

== See also ==
- Coins of British America
- Copper Panic of 1789
- Simsbury Mine
- Thomas Machin
- Vermont copper

== Sources ==
- The Guidebook & Catalogue of British Commonwealth Coins 1649.1971 3rd Edition by Jerome Remick, Somer James, Anthony Dowle, and Patrick Finn.
