= Granby Center Historic District =

Historic district in Connecticut, United States

- U.S. National Register of Historic Places
- U.S. Historic district
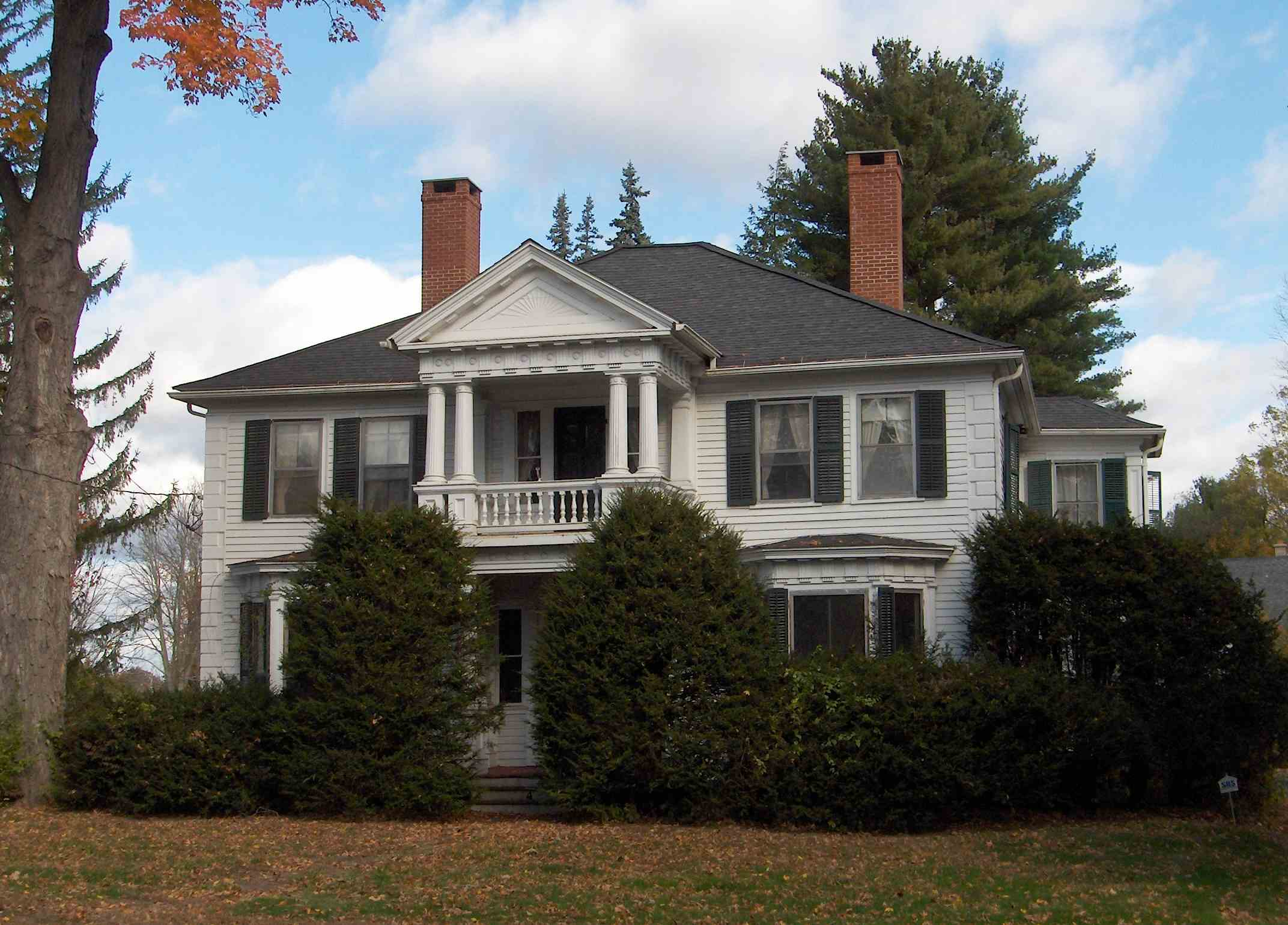

- Location within Connecticut Location within the United States
- Location: 3–8 East Granby Road, 2 Park Place, and 207–265 Salmon Brook Street South, Granby, Connecticut
- Coordinates: 41°57′0″N 72°47′33″W
- Area: 85 acres (34 ha)
- Architectural style: Colonial Revival, Queen Anne, Federal
- NRHP reference No.: 85003149
- Added to NRHP: October 17, 1985

The Granby Center Historic District is a predominantly residential historic district encompassing a portion of the village of Granby Center in Granby, Connecticut. The village developed in the 18th century as a farming center, and a now includes a variety of architectural styles from the late 18th to early 20th centuries. The district was listed on the National Register of Historic Places (NRHP) in 1985.

== Description and history ==
The town of Granby was settled in the 17th century, and was part of Simsbury before incorporating in 1786. Granby Center, located in the eastern part of the town due to the later separation of East Granby, is one of three villages that arose in the town, and has historically been its principal civic center. Land use practice of the period was to place houses in the village, with agricultural lands in the outlying areas, and it was along what is now South Salmon Brook Street. This stretch of road, now designated Connecticut Route 10 and United States Route 202, retains a tree-lined streetscape of wide lawns and well-spaced houses. Most of the village's early civic and commercial buildings have not survived, in part due to a major fire in 1876, and were not rebuilt.

The historic district extends from the town center at the junction of Salmon Brook Street, Granby Road, and Hartford Avenue, south roughly to a modern fire station. It has 35 properties historic properties, includes two buildings dating to the 18th century, 24 dating to the 19th century and 8 dating to the 20th century. The buildings are in a mixture of styles, including Colonial Revival, Queen Anne, Italianate, Georgian and Federal. Most of the buildings were used as dwellings, including the building at 4 East Granby Road. The building at 2 Park Place was originally a dwelling, then a hotel, and then reverted to a dwelling. One building, a former schoolhouse, served as the town hall between 1951 and 1964.

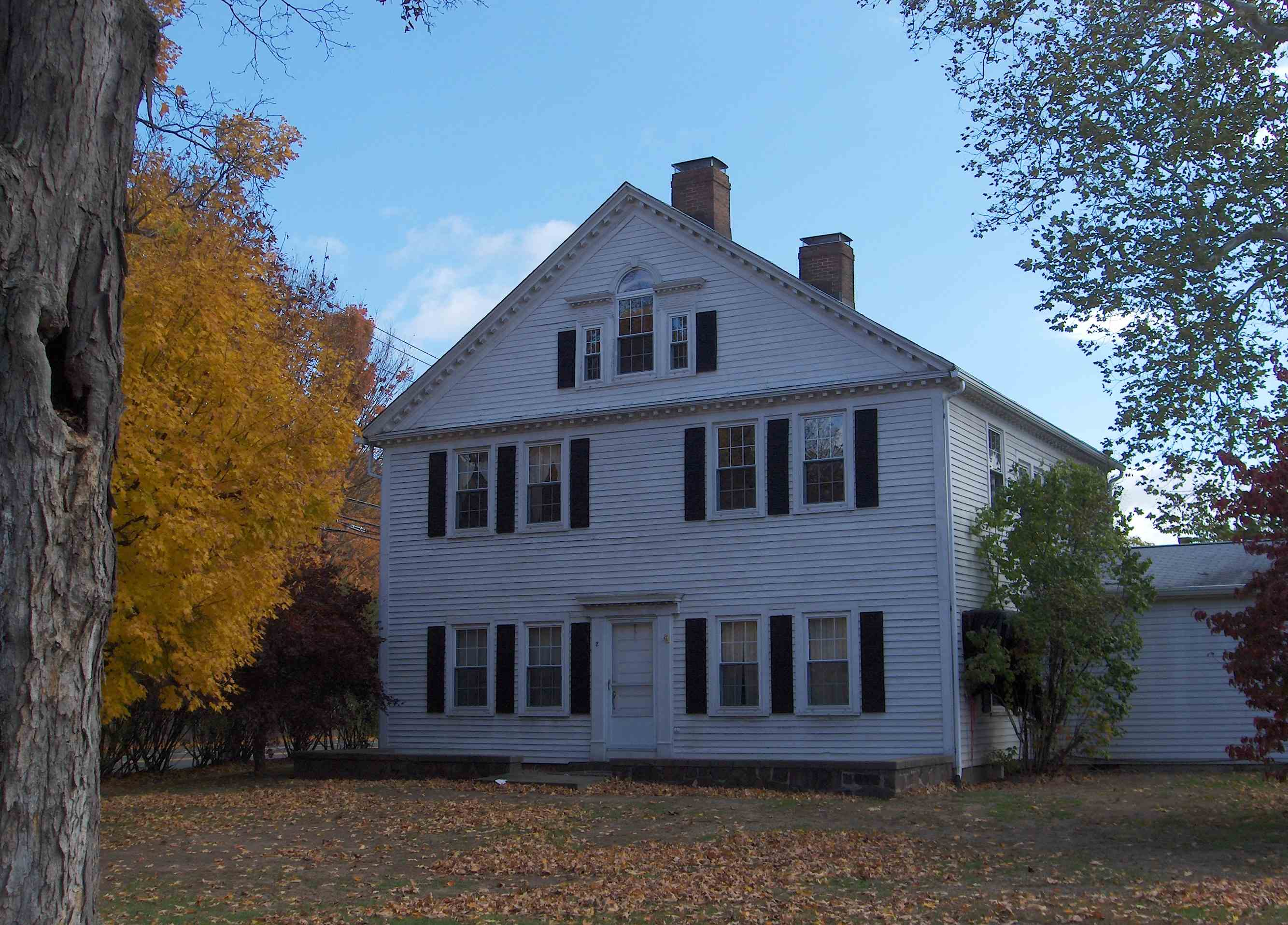
2 Park Place

== See also ==
- National Register of Historic Places listings in Hartford County, Connecticut
