= Salmon Brook, Connecticut =

Census-designated place in Connecticut, United States

- Census-designated place
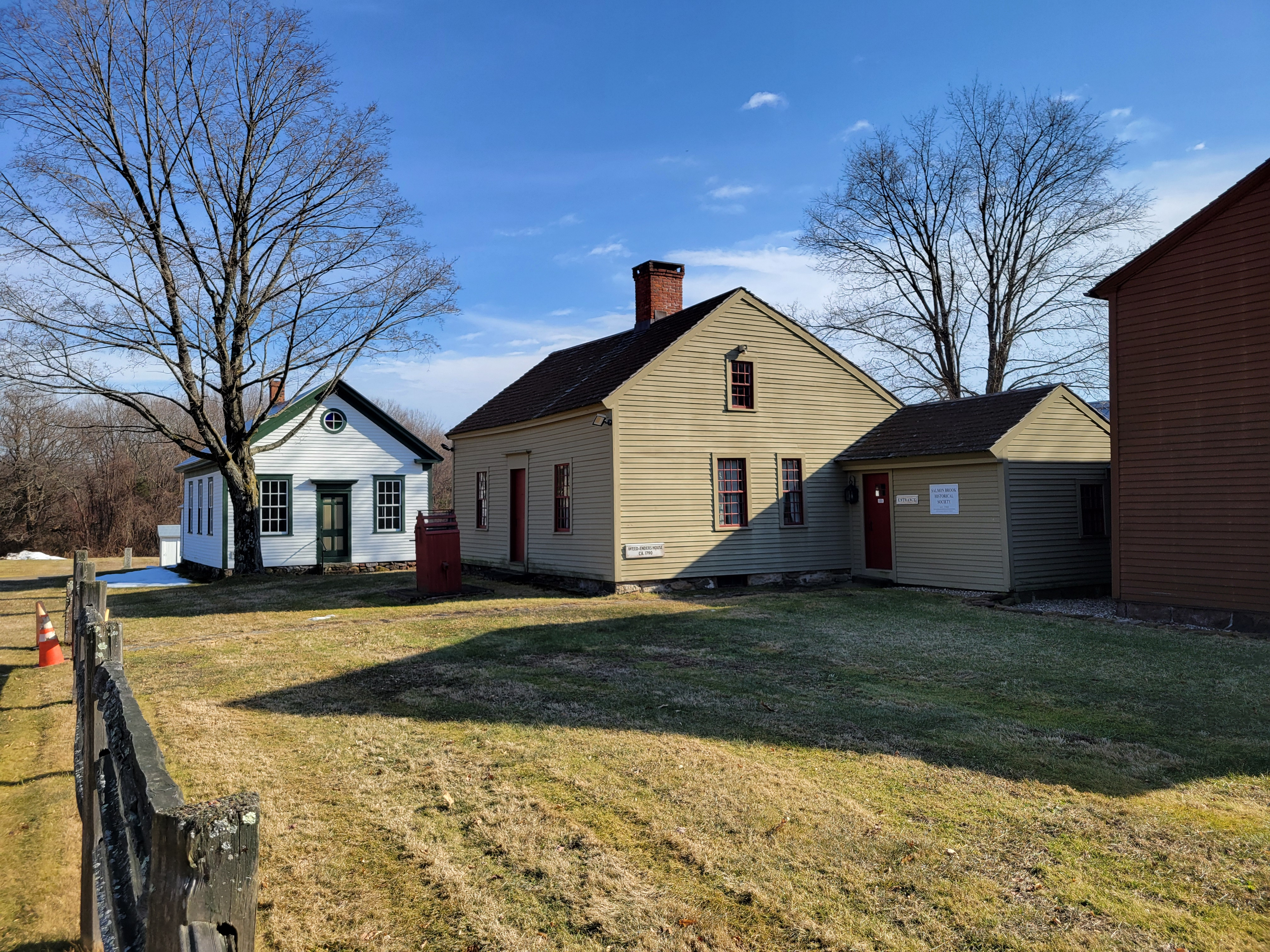
- Salmon Brook Historical Society

- Location within Connecticut Location within the United States
- Coordinates: 41°57′13″N 72°47′21″W
- Country: United States
- State: Connecticut
- County: Hartford
- Town: Granby

Area
  - Total: 3.0 sq mi (7.8 km^{2})
  - Land: 3.0 sq mi (7.8 km^{2})
  - Water: 0 sq mi (0 km^{2})
- Elevation: 215 ft (66 m)

Population (2020)
  - Total: 2,428
  - Density: 810/sq mi (310/km^{2})
- Time zone: UTC-5 (Eastern)
  - Summer (DST): UTC-4 (Eastern)
- ZIP code: 06035
- Area code: 860
- FIPS code: 09-66455
- GNIS feature ID: 2377858

Salmon Brook is the name of a census-designated place (CDP) corresponding to the village of Granby, the primary settlement of the town of Granby, Connecticut, United States, in Hartford County. As of the 2020 census, Salmon Brook had a population of 2,428.

== Geography ==
Salmon Brook is a stream that flows to the east of Granby village, leading south to the Farmington River. The West Branch of Salmon Brook flows to the south of the village, which is located primarily on a flat terrace 50 feet (15 m) above the level of the brook valleys. According to the United States Census Bureau, the CDP has a total area of 3.0 square miles (7.8 km^{2}), all land.

The village is located at the intersection of several major roads. U.S. Route 202 and Connecticut Route 10 pass north–south through the village, leading north to Westfield, Massachusetts, and south to Simsbury. Connecticut Route 20 passes east–west through the village, leading east to Bradley International Airport and Windsor Locks and west towards Winsted. Connecticut Route 189 leads northwest from Granby/Salmon Brook to Granville, Massachusetts, and southeast via Tariffville and Bloomfield to Hartford. All of the highways converge at the Granby Green in the center of the village.

== Demographics ==
=== 2020 census ===
As of the 2020 census, Salmon Brook had a population of 2,428. The median age was 50.6 years. 19.5% of residents were under the age of 18 and 24.3% of residents were 65 years of age or older. For every 100 females there were 83.5 males, and for every 100 females age 18 and over there were 83.9 males age 18 and over.

96.9% of residents lived in urban areas, while 3.1% lived in rural areas.

There were 1,023 households in Salmon Brook, of which 28.5% had children under the age of 18 living in them. Of all households, 56.0% were married-couple households, 16.2% were households with a male householder and no spouse or partner present, and 24.2% were households with a female householder and no spouse or partner present. About 27.7% of all households were made up of individuals and 15.9% had someone living alone who was 65 years of age or older.

There were 1,088 housing units, of which 6.0% were vacant. The homeowner vacancy rate was 3.2% and the rental vacancy rate was 5.9%.

Racial composition as of the 2020 census
Race	Number	Percent
White	2,137	88.0%
Black or African American	30	1.2%
American Indian and Alaska Native	9	0.4%
Asian	52	2.1%
Native Hawaiian and Other Pacific Islander	0	0.0%
Some other race	10	0.4%
Two or more races	190	7.8%
Hispanic or Latino (of any race)	97	4.0%

=== 2000 census ===
As of the census of 2000, there were 2,453 people, 988 households, and 672 families residing in the CDP. The population density was 826.8 inhabitants per square mile (319.2/km^{2}). There were 1,018 housing units at an average density of 343.1 per square mile (132.5/km^{2}). The racial makeup of the CDP was 98.08% White, 0.24% African American, 0.16% Native American, 0.49% Asian, 0.04% Pacific Islander, 0.33% from other races, and 0.65% from two or more races. Hispanic or Latino of any race were 1.14% of the population.

There were 988 households, out of which 32.2% had children under the age of 18 living with them, 58.2% were married couples living together, 7.7% had a female householder with no husband present, and 31.9% were non-families. 26.9% of all households were made up of individuals, and 13.3% had someone living alone who was 65 years of age or older. The average household size was 2.39 and the average family size was 2.92.

In the CDP, the population was spread out, with 23.7% under the age of 18, 3.3% from 18 to 24, 29.9% from 25 to 44, 24.3% from 45 to 64, and 18.8% who were 65 years of age or older. The median age was 41 years. For every 100 females, there were 87.8 males. For every 100 females age 18 and over, there were 83.5 males.

The median income for a household in the CDP was $67,500, and the median income for a family was $80,945. Males had a median income of $57,424 versus $40,307 for females. The per capita income for the CDP was $32,311. About 3.1% of families and 6.0% of the population were below the poverty line, including 10.0% of those under age 18 and 7.3% of those age 65 or over.
