= North Granby, Connecticut =

- Census-designated place
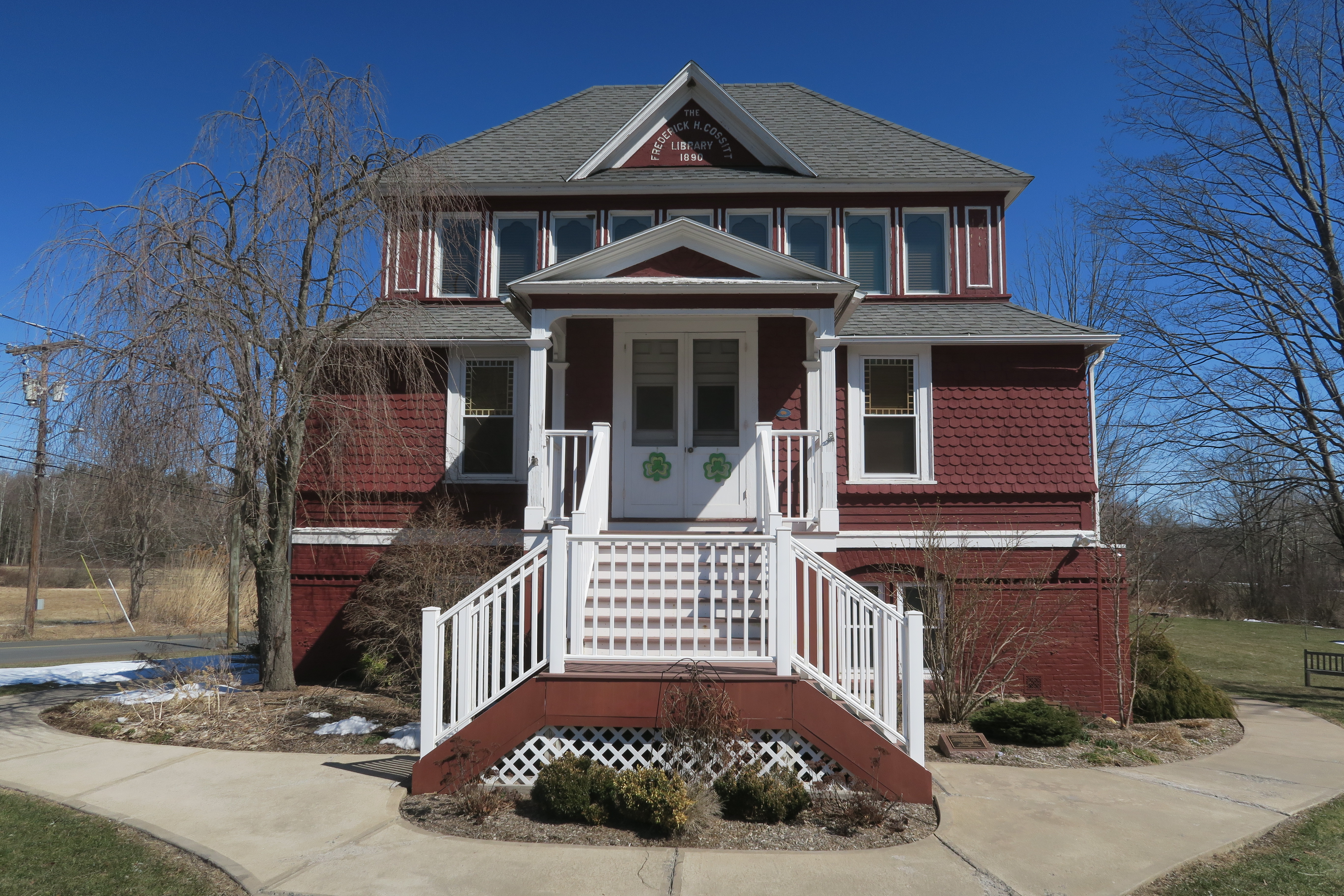
- Frederick H Cossitt Library

- Location within Connecticut Location within the United States
- Coordinates: 41°59′45″N 72°49′50″W
- Country: United States
- State: Connecticut
- County: Hartford
- Town: Granby

Area
  - Total: 8.3 sq mi (21.6 km^{2})
  - Land: 8.3 sq mi (21.6 km^{2})
  - Water: 0 sq mi (0.0 km^{2})
- Elevation: 293 ft (89 m)

Population (2010)
  - Total: 1,944
  - Density: 230/sq mi (90/km^{2})
- Time zone: UTC-5 (Eastern)
  - Summer (DST): UTC-4 (Eastern)
- ZIP code: 06060
- Area code: 860
- FIPS code: 09-54660
- GNIS feature ID: 2377841

North Granby is a village and census-designated place (CDP) in Hartford County, Connecticut, United States. It is part of the town of Granby. As of the 2020 census, North Granby had a population of 1,835.

The center of North Granby is today marked principally by the Cossitt Branch Library and the Allen Cider Mill.

== Geography ==
According to the United States Census Bureau, the CDP has a total area of 8.3 square miles (21.6 km^{2}), all land.

== Demographics ==
=== 2020 census ===
As of the 2020 census, North Granby had a population of 1,835. The median age was 48.3 years. 23.4% of residents were under the age of 18 and 18.0% of residents were 65 years of age or older. For every 100 females there were 101.9 males, and for every 100 females age 18 and over there were 98.0 males age 18 and over.

0.0% of residents lived in urban areas, while 100.0% lived in rural areas.

There were 659 households in North Granby, of which 32.5% had children under the age of 18 living in them. Of all households, 77.1% were married-couple households, 7.9% were households with a male householder and no spouse or partner present, and 10.0% were households with a female householder and no spouse or partner present. About 10.9% of all households were made up of individuals and 5.9% had someone living alone who was 65 years of age or older.

There were 684 housing units, of which 3.7% were vacant. The homeowner vacancy rate was 2.2% and the rental vacancy rate was 0.0%.

Racial composition as of the 2020 census
Race	Number	Percent
White	1,661	90.5%
Black or African American	27	1.5%
American Indian and Alaska Native	6	0.3%
Asian	15	0.8%
Native Hawaiian and Other Pacific Islander	0	0.0%
Some other race	10	0.5%
Two or more races	116	6.3%
Hispanic or Latino (of any race)	71	3.9%

=== 2000 census ===
As of the 2000 census, there were 1,720 people, 568 households, and 500 families residing in the CDP. The population density was 205.8 inhabitants per square mile (79.5/km^{2}). There were 579 housing units at an average density of 69.3 per square mile (26.8/km^{2}). The racial makeup of the CDP was 96.86% White, 0.58% African American, 0.23% Native American, 0.93% Asian, 0.47% from other races, and 0.93% from two or more races. Hispanic or Latino of any race were 1.69% of the population.

There were 568 households, out of which 47.2% had children under the age of 18 living with them, 81.3% were married couples living together, 4.8% had a female householder with no husband present, and 11.8% were non-families. 7.9% of all households were made up of individuals, and 2.8% had someone living alone who was 65 years of age or older. The average household size was 3.03 and the average family size was 3.22.

In the CDP the population was spread out, with 30.8% under the age of 18, 4.1% from 18 to 24, 28.1% from 25 to 44, 32.2% from 45 to 64, and 4.8% who were 65 years of age or older. The median age was 39 years. For every 100 females, there were 106.5 males. For every 100 females age 18 and over, there were 100.0 males.

In 2000 the median income for a household in the CDP was $101,103, and the median income for a family was $103,133. Males had a median income of $69,028 versus $39,922 for females. The per capita income for the CDP was $34,459. About 1.6% of families and 3.7% of the population were below the poverty line, including 1.9% of those under age 18 and none of those age 65 or over.

=== Demographic estimates ===
The 2008 estimated median household income was $127,851 with the per capita income at $44,078. The 2008 estimated median house value was appraised at $447,917. The mean sale price of all houses in 2008 was $455,555.
