= Judah Holcomb House =

Historic house in Connecticut, United States

- U.S. National Register of Historic Places
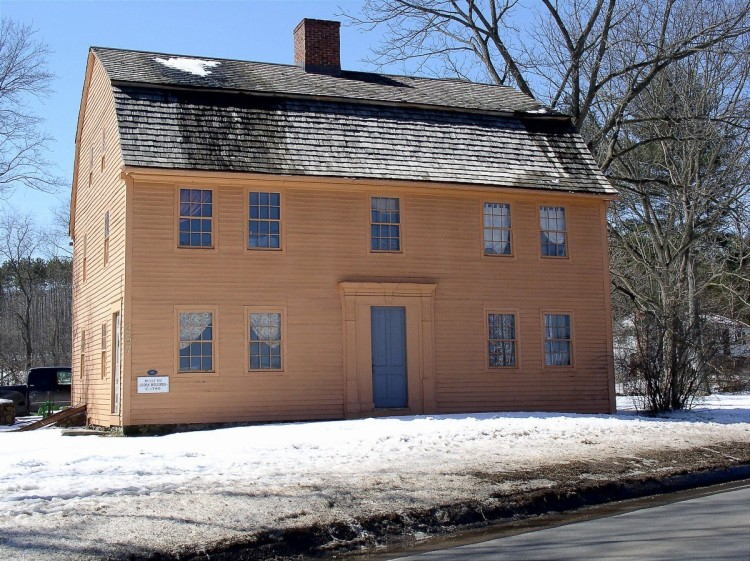

- Location within Connecticut Location within the United States
- Location: 257 North Granby Road, Granby, Connecticut
- Coordinates: 41°58′50″N 72°49′8″W
- Area: 2 acres (0.81 ha)
- Built: 1776
- Architectural style: Center chimney plan
- NRHP reference No.: 88000755
- Added to NRHP: June 16, 1988

The Judah Holcomb House was a historic house at 257 North Granby Road in Granby, Connecticut, Built in 1776, it was a well-preserved example of late Georgian architecture, notable for its elaborate entry surround and its wealth of interior woodwork. It was listed on the National Register of Historic Places in 1988.

== Description and history ==
The Judah Holcomb House stood northwest of the village center of Granby, on the west side of North Granby Road north of Kearns Drive. It was a 2 1/2-story wood-frame structure, with a gambrel roof, central chimney, and clapboarded exterior. Its main facade was five bays wide, with a central entrance. The entrance surround was particularly fine, with fluted pilasters rising to an architrave and dentillated cornice. Sash windows were surrounded by simple trim, with those on the second floor butting against the plain box cornice. The interior of the house followed a typical central chimney plan, including a winding staircase in the front vestibule, parlor spaces to either side of the chimney, and the kitchen behind it. The downstairs rooms were notable for being entire sheathed in vertical board paneling that is unusually wide, typically 18 to 20 inches (46 to 51 cm) in width, a quantity not seen in other period houses in the state. Other chambers in the house also exhibited some amount of similar wainscoting.

The house was built about 1776 by Judah Holcomb, when the area was still part of Simsbury. Holcomb's grandfather was an early settler of the area, and he was politically active, serving as a justice of the peace and in the state legislature. The house remained in the Holcomb family until 1894. It was notable for its entry surround, which is rare within the state as a vernacular flat-top surround, contrasting with more widely found broken-scroll pediments.

The house experienced a significant fire and was subsequently demolished. The doorway survived the fire and is now at Historic Deerfield.

== See also ==
- National Register of Historic Places listings in Hartford County, Connecticut
