= Granby, Connecticut =

- Town
- Town of Granby
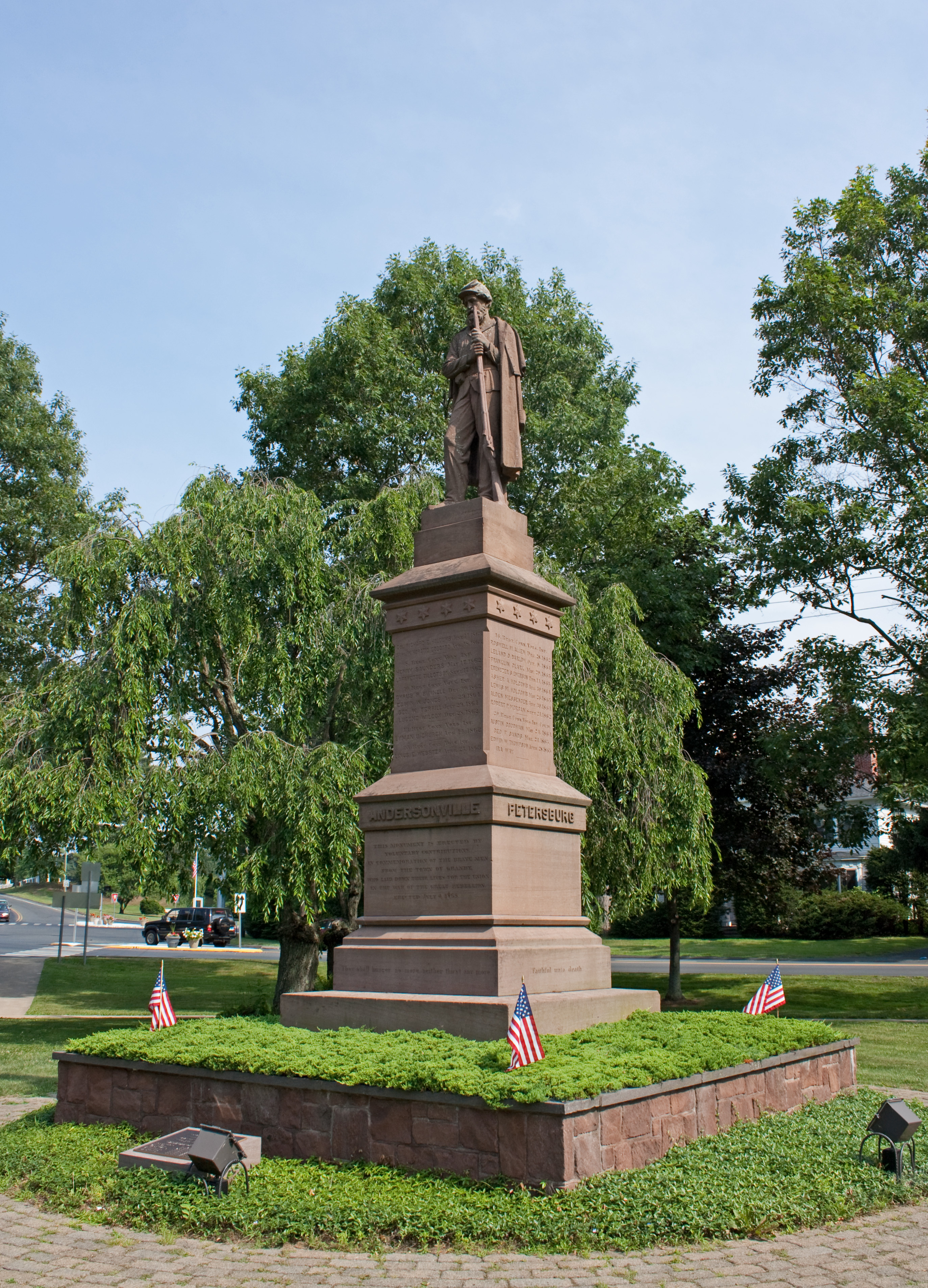
- Civil War Soldiers' Monument in the town center

- Seal
- Interactive map of Granby, Connecticut
- Coordinates: 41°57′44″N 72°50′22″W
- Country: United States
- U.S. state: Connecticut
- County: Hartford
- Region: Capitol Region
- Settled: 1723
- Incorporated: 1786
- Villages: Granby (Salmon Brook); Five Points; Goodrichville; Hungary; Mechanicsville; North Granby; Pegville; West Granby

Government
  - Type: Board of selectmen-town manager
  - First Selectman: Mark Fiorentino (R)
  - Selectmen: Mark C. Neumann (R); Frederick Moffa (D); Margaret Q. Chapple (D); Kim Becker (D)
  - Town manager: Michael Walsh

Area
  - Total: 40.8 sq mi (105.7 km^{2})
  - Land: 40.7 sq mi (105.4 km^{2})
  - Water: 0.15 sq mi (0.4 km^{2})
- Elevation: 548 ft (167 m)

Population (2020)
  - Total: 10,903
  - Density: 267.9/sq mi (103.4/km^{2})
- Time zone: UTC-5 (Eastern)
  - Summer (DST): UTC-4 (Eastern)
- ZIP Codes: 06035, 06060, 06090
- Area codes: 860/959
- FIPS code: 09-32640
- GNIS feature ID: 0213434
- Website: www.granby-ct.gov

Granby is a town in northern Hartford County, Connecticut, United States. The town is part of the Capitol Planning Region. The population was 10,903 at the 2020 census. The town center is defined as a census-designated place known as Salmon Brook. Other areas in town include North Granby and West Granby. Granby is a rural town, located in the foothills of the Litchfield Hills of the Berkshires; besides the suburban natured center, the outskirts of town are filled with dense woods and rolling hills and mountains. From the 1890s to the 1920s, many immigrants from Sweden came to reside in the town.

== History ==
Granby was founded by people who lived in Simsbury and settled as early as 1723. Granby was part of Simsbury until 1786, when it became independent. The name is from Granby, Massachusetts in return, where it was named in honor of John Manners, Marquess of Granby.

Part of Southwick, Massachusetts, known as "the Notch" seceded from Massachusetts in 1774, just before the outbreak of the American Revolutionary War. This territory became part of Granby when it seceded from Simsbury, but was returned to Southwick as part of an 1803–1804 border dispute compromise. (See History of Massachusetts.)

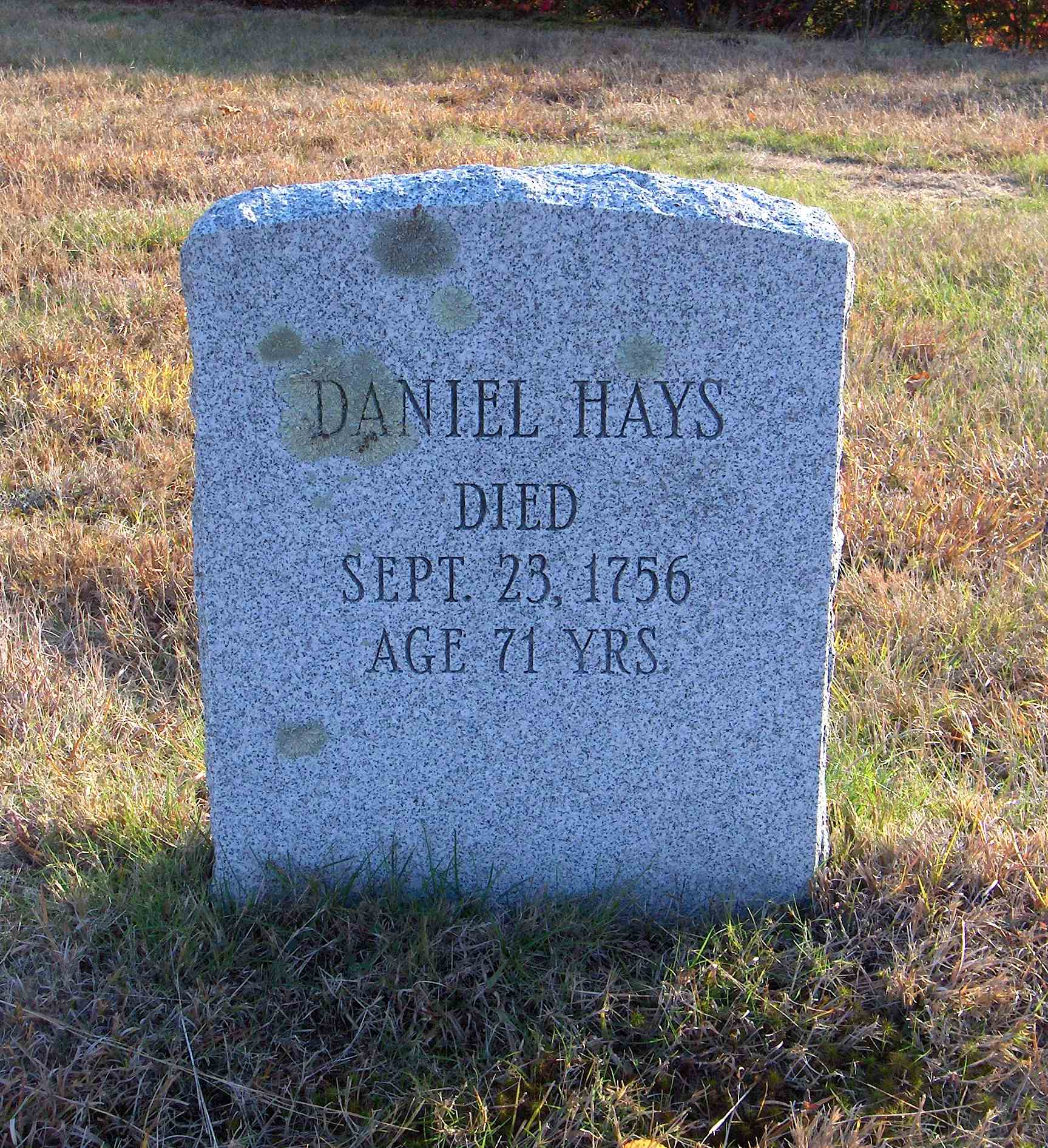
Daniel Hayes gravestone

In 1707, Daniel Hayes (born c. 1685 – died 1756), then aged 22, was captured and kidnapped by a hostile indigenous tribe and carried off to Canada. The capture was witnessed, and a rescue party raised, but the group did not catch up with the captors. He was tied up each night, and bound to saplings. It took 30 days to reach Canada, at which point Hayes was forced to run the gauntlet. Near the end of the gauntlet, he hid in a wigwam to avoid an attempted blow by a club. The woman in the wigwam declared that the house was sacred, and having lost a husband and son to a war, adopted Hayes as her son. He remained for several years, attending to the woman. Eventually, he was sold to a Frenchman, who learned that Hayes had skill as a weaver, so put him to work in that business. Hayes managed to earn enough to buy his freedom after two years. He then returned to Simsbury, settled down on a farm and married. He became prominent, both in civil affairs as well as the church at Salmon Brook (now Granby).

The first unauthorized coins minted in the American colonies, and the first in Connecticut, were struck by Dr. Samuel Higley in 1737 from copper mined from his own mine. The Higley coppers were minted in North Simsbury, now called Granby. These coins were made of pure copper, which is very soft. Consequently, there are very few in existence today. The first coins were inscribed with a value of three pence. Later versions carried the phrase "Value me as you please."

In 1858, the eastern part of the town broke off and formed to become East Granby, the town is one of the newly established town in the state.

In 2009 Connecticut Magazine ranked Granby the #3 overall Connecticut small town (population 10,000–15,000) to live in, and #1 small town in Hartford County.

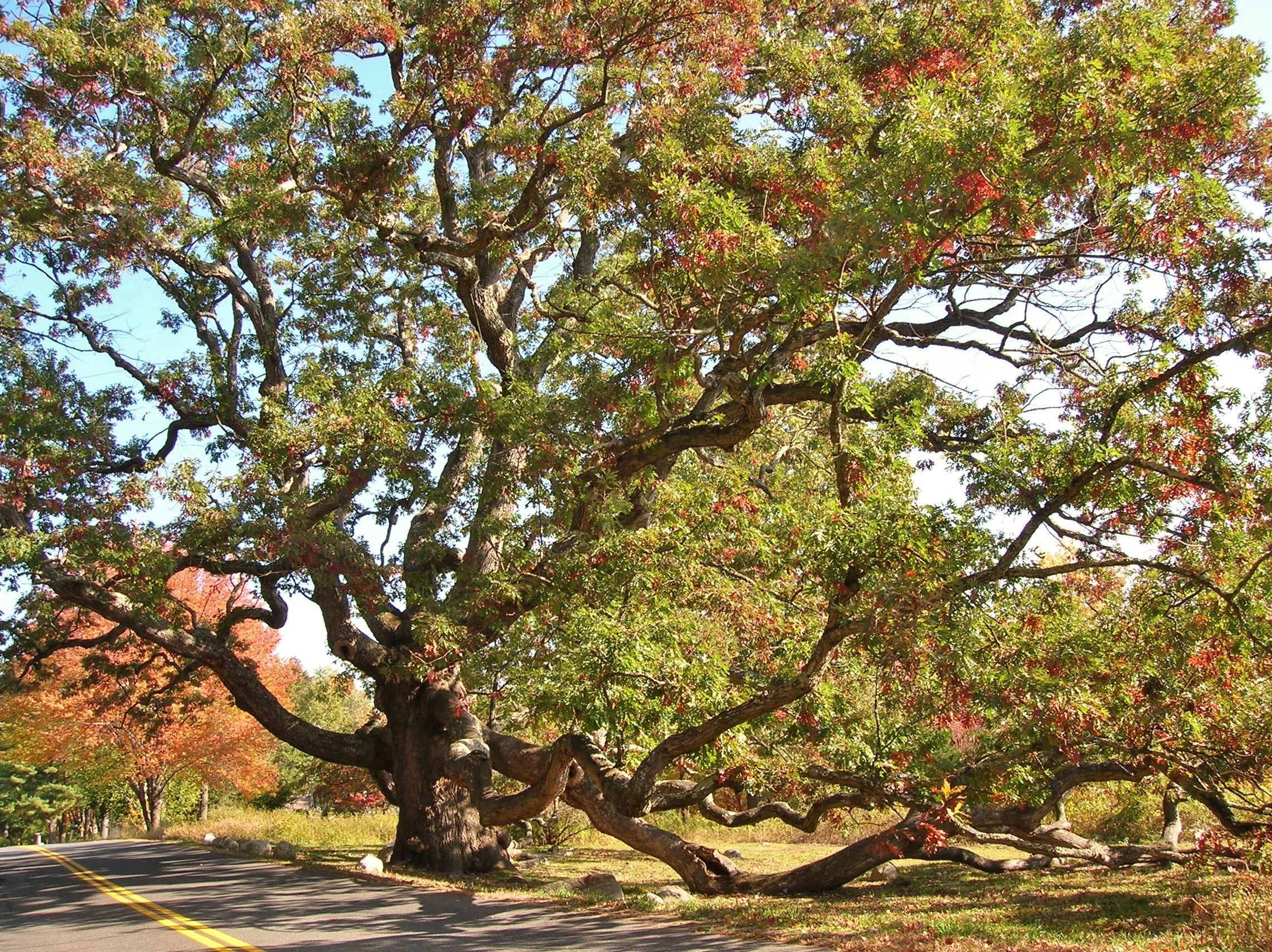
"Dewey Oak" in Granby

The town seal depicts the Dewey-Granby Oak, a large white oak estimated to be 450–500 years old, thought to be one of the oldest trees in New England.

== Geography ==
According to the United States Census Bureau, the town has a total area of 40.8 square miles (105.7 km^{2}), of which 40.7 square miles (105.4 km^{2}) is land and 0.15 square miles (0.4 km^{2}), or 0.33%, is water. The town center (Salmon Brook CDP) has a total area of 3.0 square miles (7.8 km^{2}), all land. According to Google Earth, the highest point in Granby is 1,153 feet (351 m) in West Granby at 41°55'57.81" N 72°53'17.18" W. The town is covered in dense woodlands containing animals such as the black bear, eastern moose, and white-tailed deer. Granby is warm and often humid in summer, with occasional thunderstorms, while winter can have heavy snow and cold temperatures. Snow and cold temperatures are not uncommon in early spring and late fall due to the town's location in the Berkshires.

== Demographics ==
Historical population
Census	Pop.	Note	%±
1820	3,012		—
1850	2,498		—
1860	1,720		−31.1%
1870	1,517		−11.8%
1880	1,340		−11.7%
1890	1,251		−6.6%
1900	1,299		3.8%
1910	1,383		6.5%
1920	1,342		−3.0%
1930	1,388		3.4%
1940	1,544		11.2%
1950	2,693		74.4%
1960	4,968		84.5%
1970	6,150		23.8%
1980	7,956		29.4%
1990	9,369		17.8%
2000	10,347		10.4%
2010	11,282		9.0%
2020	10,903		−3.4%
U.S. Decennial Census

As of the census of 2000, there were 10,347 people, 3,781 households, and 2,994 families residing in the town. The population density was 254.3 inhabitants per square mile (98.2/km^{2}). There were 3,887 housing units at an average density of 95.5 per square mile (36.9/km^{2}). The racial makeup of the town was 97.54% White, 0.61% African American, 0.23% Native American, 0.74% Asian, 0.02% Pacific Islander, 0.23% from other races, and 0.63% from two or more races. Hispanic or Latino of any race were 1.30% of the population.

There were 3,781 households, out of which 39.5% had children under the age of 18 living with them, 71.1% were married couples living together, 5.9% had a female householder with no husband present, and 20.8% were non-families. 16.5% of all households were made up of individuals, and 6.8% had someone living alone who was 65 years of age or older. The average household size was 2.71 and the average family size was 3.06.

In the town, the population was spread out, with 27.3% under the age of 18, 3.7% from 18 to 24, 30.1% from 25 to 44, 27.8% from 45 to 64, and 11.0% who were 65 years of age or older. The median age was 40 years. For every 100 females, there were 98.7 males. For every 100 females age 18 and over, there were 95.1 males.

The median income for a household in the town was $81,151, and the median income for a family was $90,057. Males had a median income of $63,093 versus $42,203 for females. The per capita income for the town was $33,863. About 1.5% of families and 3.1% of the population were below the poverty line, including 3.6% of those under age 18 and 3.2% of those age 65 or over.

== Government and politics ==
Once a Republican stronghold, Granby has become friendlier to Democrats in recent presidential elections. Granby voters flipped from supporting Republican Mitt Romney in 2012 to Democrat Hillary Clinton in 2016. This mirrored a national trend of suburban voters shifting from Donald Trump. In 2020, Democrat Joe Biden won Granby by more than 10 percentage points.

Granby town vote by party in presidential elections
Year	Democratic	Republican	Third Parties
2024	55.85% 4,108	42.38% 3,118	1.77% 130
2020	54.68% 4,029	42.97% 3,166	2.35% 173
2016	47.84% 3,114	45.58% 2,967	6.58% 428
2012	48.28% 3,079	50.50% 3,221	1.22% 78
2008	53.23% 3,456	45.39% 2,947	1.37% 89
2004	48.25% 3,015	49.74% 3,108	2.02% 126
2000	45.73% 2,576	48.80% 2,749	5.47% 308
1996	42.56% 2,196	44.22% 2,282	13.22% 682
1992	35.74% 1,998	39.03% 2,182	25.22% 1,410
1988	38.31% 1,882	60.68% 2,981	1.02% 50
1984	28.19% 1,247	71.47% 3,161	0.34% 15
1980	28.42% 1,196	52.58% 2,213	19.01% 800
1976	35.60% 1,253	63.86% 2,248	0.54% 19
1972	32.36% 1,044	66.68% 2,151	0.96% 31
1968	35.82% 954	59.90% 1,595	4.28% 114
1964	55.16% 1,368	44.84% 1,112	0.00% 0
1960	34.88% 850	65.12% 1,587	0.00% 0
1956	23.05% 446	76.95% 1,489	0.00% 0

Voter Registration and Party Enrollment as of November 1, 2022
Party	Active Voters	Inactive Voters	Total Voters	Percentage
Republican	2,440	189	2,629	29.20%
Democratic	2,473	183	2,656	29.50%
Unaffiliated	3,203	343	3,546	39.39%
Minor parties	151	19	170	1.88%
Total	8,267	734	9,001	100%

== Education ==
Granby's public school system consists of one primary school, one intermediate school, one middle school, and one high school.

- Kelly Lane Primary School (Grades: K–2)
- Wells Road Intermediate School (Grades: 3–5)
- Granby Memorial Middle School (Grades: 6–8)
- Granby Memorial High School (Grades: 9–12)

== Economy ==
=== Top employers ===
Top employers in Granby according to the town's 2023 Comprehensive Annual Financial Report

#	Employer	# of Employees
1	Town of Granby	300-375
2	Meadowbrook of Granby	100-249
3	Imperial Nursery/Monrovia	100-249
4	Stop & Shop	100-249
5	Geissler's Supermarket	100-249
6	Keller Williams Classic Reality	100-249
7	Salmon Brook Vet Hospital	50-99
8	State Line Energy	50-99
9	High Meadow Day Camp	50-99
10	Farmington Valley YMCA	50-99

== National Register of Historic Places ==
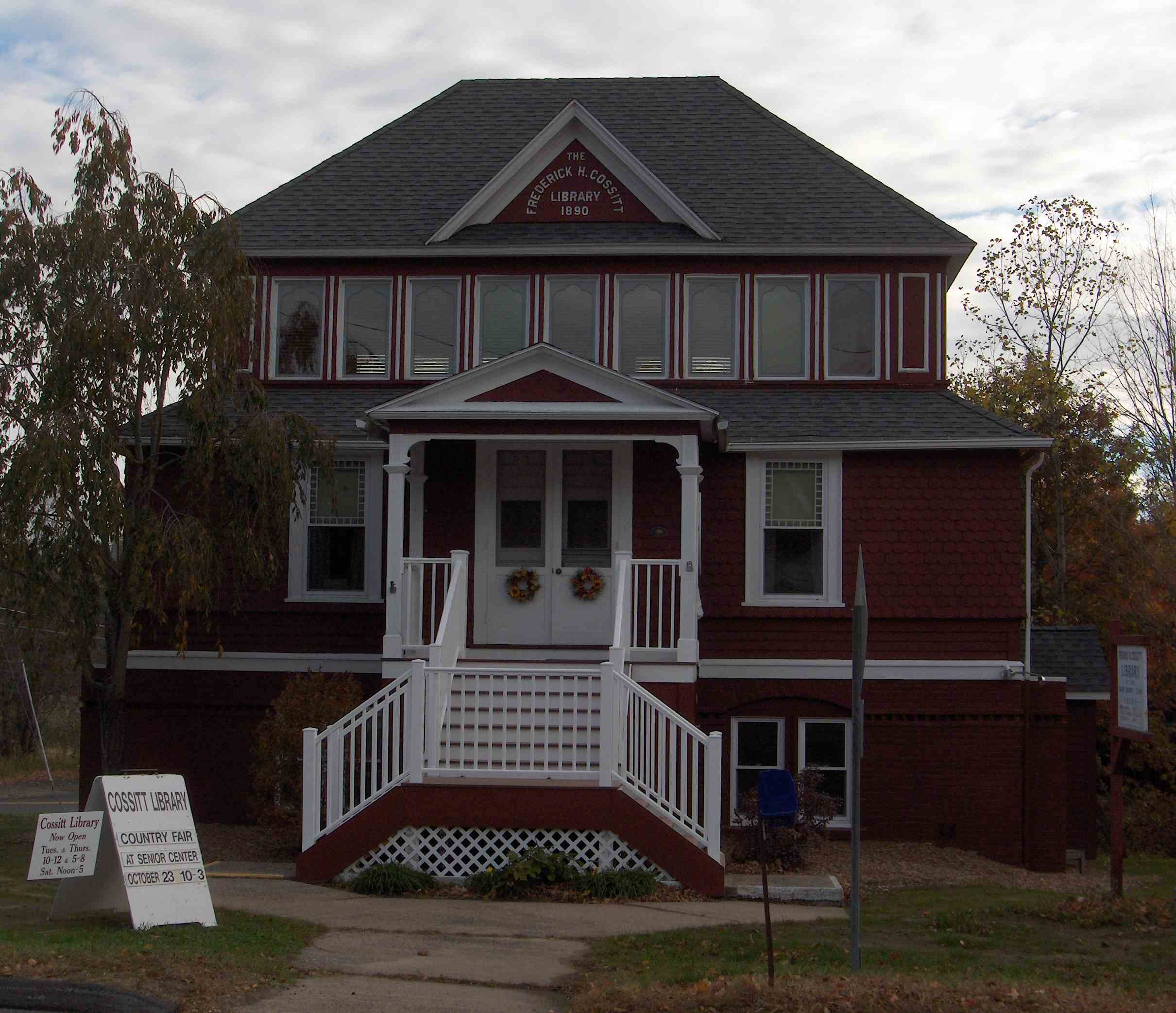
Frederick H. Cossitt Library

- Allen's Cider Mill
- Frederick H. Cossitt Library
- Granby Center Historic District
- Samuel Hayes II House
- Judah Holcomb House
- Nathaniel Holcomb III House
- Rowe and Weed Houses
- West Granby Historic District

== Notable people ==
- Adam Burt (born 1969), former NHL player, played with the Hartford Whalers
- Joe Bouchard (born 1948), musician, member of Blue Öyster Cult
- Jesse Camp (born 1979), MTV VJ
- Chauncey Forward (1793–1839), congressman from Pennsylvania
- Bryan Nash Gill (1961–2013), artist
- George S. Godard (1865–1936), librarian
- Philip C. Hayes (1833–1916), congressman from Illinois
- Byron Kilbourn (1801–1870), surveyor and politician
- Rebecca Lobo (born 1973), former Women's National Basketball Association player
- Garrett Lucash (born 1978), figure skater
- Theodore Mills Maltbie (1842–1915), lawyer and politician
- William M. Maltbie (1880–1961), Chief Justice of the Connecticut Supreme Court
- Emily Clemens Pearson (1818-1900), writer
- Aaron Draper Shattuck (1832–1928), painter of the White Mountain School
