= Samuel Higley =

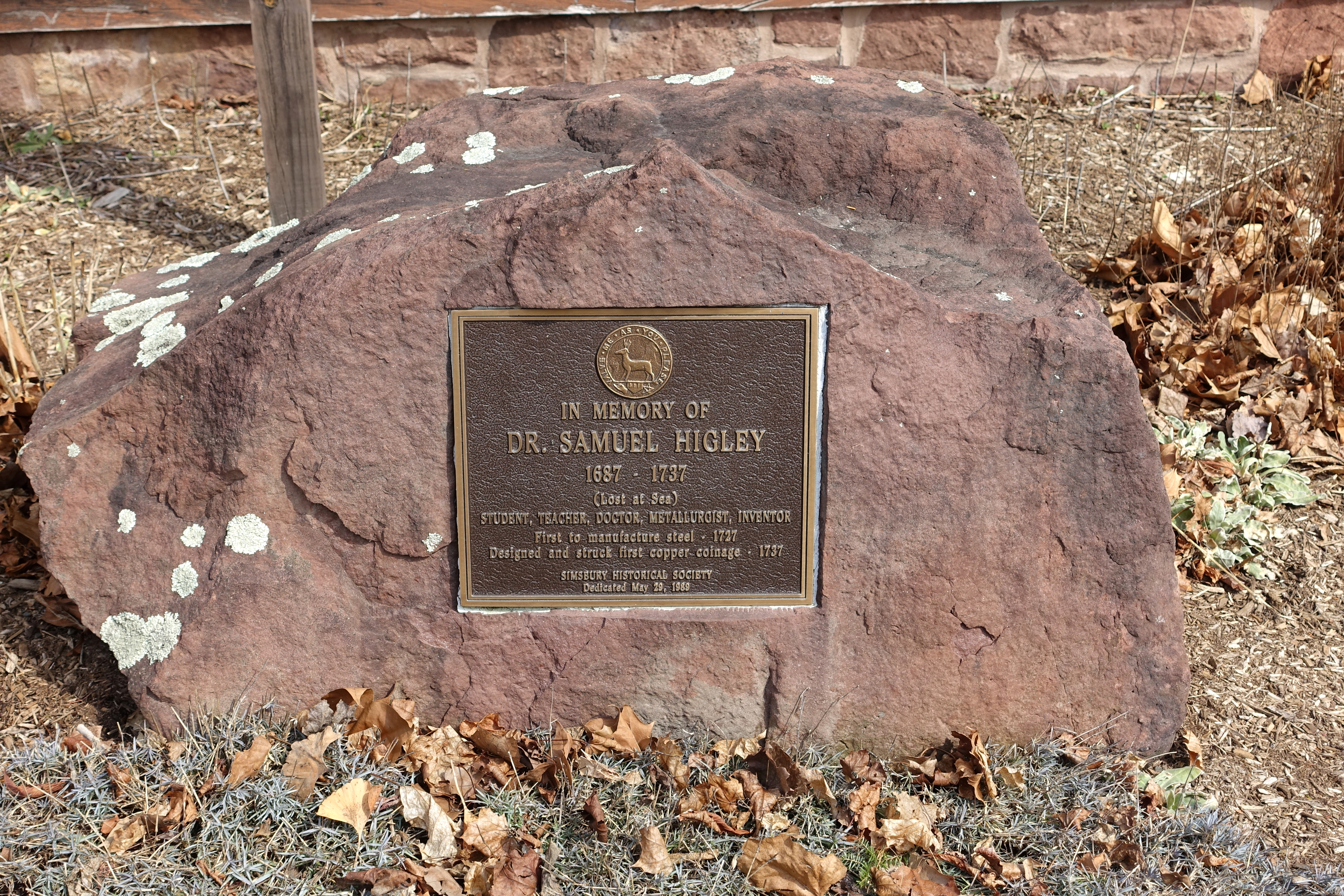
Samuel Higley memorial

Samuel Higley (1687–1737) was a blacksmith, physician, and creator of the "Higley coppers" from the Connecticut Colony. He was born in Simsbury, Connecticut and for two years attended the Collegiate School, later Yale University. He then became a teacher and pupil of physician Thomas Hooker (grandson of the colonial leader Thomas Hooker). Higley became a licensed physician in 1717.

Higley was also a practicing blacksmith and a pioneer in America in the production of steel. In 1728, the Connecticut General Court granted him exclusive rights for making steel for a period of 10 years. Higley inherited land from his father near Simsbury, known as Copper Hill, which he enlarged by purchase of 143 acres. He settled there in about 1730 and by early 1733, he had begun mining copper from this property.

Three pence, 1737

== Higley coppers ==
The Higley coppers were some of the first coins produced in America. The first Higley copper token coins Higley produced bear the date 1737. Of the 1737 coppers, four varieties have an obverse with legend "THE VALUE OF THREE PENCE" and roman numeral III. A listing of Higley coppers by Daniel Freidus lists 15 varieties in total, from 8 obverse and 5 reverse dies. Since most Higley Coppers are double struck, researchers believe that the hammer method rather than a screw press was used to make them. The sizes of these coins varied, but they were approximately the size of a modern half-dollar.

== Death ==
Higley traveled to England in May 1737 in a ship loaded with his copper. The ship vanished at sea, with no survivors. His brother, John Higley, continued in the production of the Higley Coppers.

== Sources ==
- "The History and Die Varieties of the Higley Coppers", Breen, pp. 39-40; Crosby, pp. 324-7; Daniel Freidus, in The Token: America's Other Money, ed. by Richard G. Doty, Coinage of the Americas Conference, October 29, 1994, New York: American Numismatic Society, 1-17.
- "Known Varieties of the Higley Coppers," Michael Hodder, The American Numismatic Association Centennial Anthology, ed. Carl W.A. Carlson and Michael Hodder (Wolfeboro, NH: Bowers and Merena, 1991), p. 6.
