= William Moore Jr. House =

Historic house in Connecticut, United States

- U.S. National Register of Historic Places
- U.S. Historic district – Contributing property
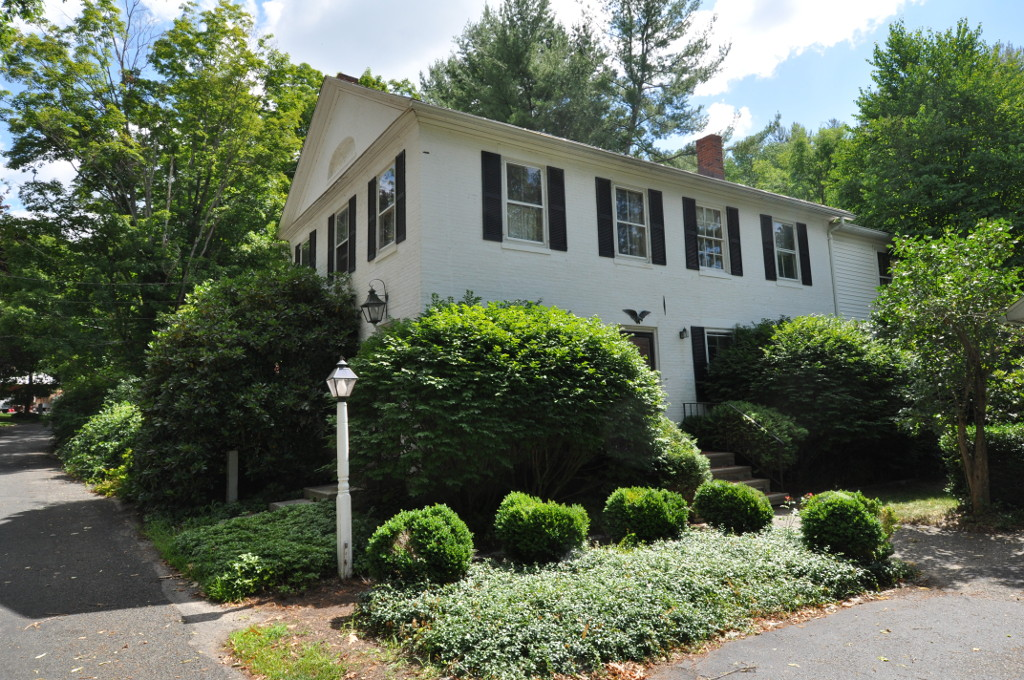

- Location within Connecticut Location within the United States
- Location: 5 Mountain Road, Barkhamsted, Connecticut
- Coordinates: 41°57′47″N 73°00′57″W
- Area: 0.4 acres (0.16 ha)
- Built by: Moore, William, Jr.
- Architectural style: Federal
- Part of: Riverton Historic District (ID07000419)
- NRHP reference No.: 99000406

Significant dates
- Added to NRHP: April 14, 1999
- Designated CP: May 15, 2007

The William Moore Jr. House is a historic house at 5 Mountain Road in the Riverton village of Barkhamsted, Connecticut. Built about 1820, it is a good local example of Federal period architecture in brick, and is notable for its association with the Moore family, where both the father and son were involved in the early chair-making trade for which Riverton is well known. The house was listed on the National Register of Historic Places in 1999.

== Description and history ==
The William Moore Jr. House is located behind the Old Riverton Inn in the village of Riverton, on the south side of Mountain Road, a dead-end residential street running east from River Road. It is a 2 1/2-story brick building, with a gable roof. The bricks are laid in common bond, and are painted white. The main entrance is in the short northwest-facing facade, which is three bays wide. The entrance is in the rightmost bay, in a recess with frame surround. The gable above has a semi-elliptical window. The interior retains a significant amount of original Federal period woodwork, including fireplace mantels and main staircase.

William Moore Sr. arrived in Riverton in the 1780s, and was one of several individuals engaged in the chair manufacturing trade. He notably worked with Lambert Hitchcock, whose stenciled and painted chairs gained renown. Moore and his son, William Moore Jr., both may have been involved in supplying Hitchcock with either parts or finished chairs that were sold under the Hitchcock name. Examples of work unambiguously identified as the work of either Moore are rare, with only a few pieces in museums. William Moore Jr. built this house about 1820, on property acquired from his father. It is known that his shop was also on the property, but no traces of it survive.

== See also ==
- National Register of Historic Places listings in Litchfield County, Connecticut
