= Old Riverton Inn =

- U.S. National Register of Historic Places
- U.S. Historic district – Contributing property
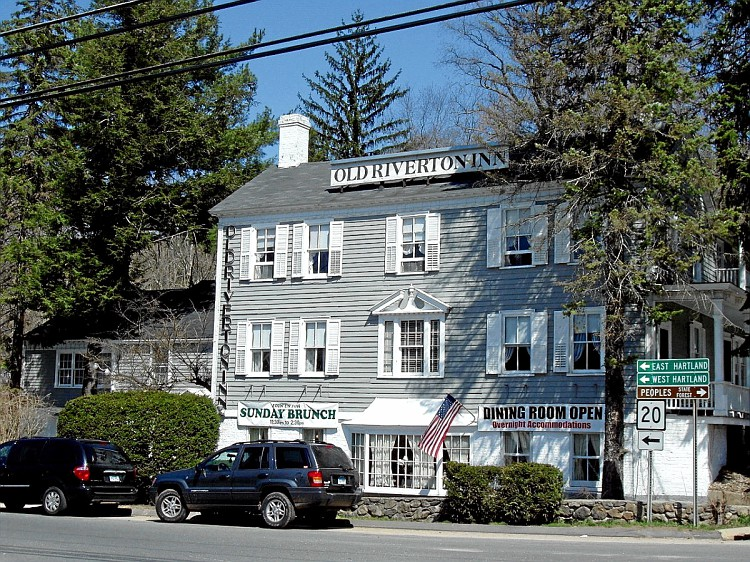

- Location within Connecticut Location within the United States
- Location: 436 East River Road, Barkhamsted, Connecticut
- Coordinates: 41°57′46″N 73°1′1″W
- Area: less than one acre
- Built: 1811
- Built by: Ives, Jesse
- Architectural style: Federal
- Part of: Riverton Historic District (ID07000419)
- NRHP reference No.: 92000906

Significant dates
- Added to NRHP: July 24, 1992
- Designated CP: May 15, 2007

The Old Riverton Inn is a historic hotel and tavern at 436 East River Road in the Riverton village of Barkhamsted, Connecticut. Built in 1811, it has been in continuous operation as a traveler's accommodation since then. It was listed on the National Register of Historic Places in 1992.

== Description and history ==
The Old Riverton Inn occupies a prominent position on the east side of the village of Riverton, standing on the east side of East River Road opposite the bridge across the East Branch Farmington River, the only bridge spanning that river in the immediate vicinity. It is a 2-1/2 story gable-roof wood frame structure, set on a brick foundation exposed on the western (street) side due to the sloping lot, giving it a three-story appearance. The street facade is five bays wide, with the main entrance originally located in the center bay. Due to road widening, the building's 19th-century porch was lost, and the entrance (its original architectural surround preserved) was relocated to the south side. The main facade now has a three-part window topped by a broken pediment in the door's location, and a wide bay window in the basement level.

The inn was built about 1811, probably by Jesse Ives, to capitalize on traffic in the area. The bridge across the river was built in 1790, and was the only crossing for miles in either direction. The north-south road was a major route between New Hartford and Massachusetts, and the western road led to Winsted. The village of Riverton also began to assume its own economic importance soon afterward, with the establishment in 1818 of the chair-making factory of Lambert Hitchcock, some of whose buildings survive across the river. The inn survived the village's economic decline after it failed to secure a railroad connection, and has been operated for as a traveler accommodation for all but a twelve-year period in the early 20th century, when it housed migrant workers.

== See also ==
- National Register of Historic Places listings in Litchfield County, Connecticut
