= American Legion State Forest Trails =

Hiking trails in Connecticut, United States

Coordinates: 41.933°N 73.011°W

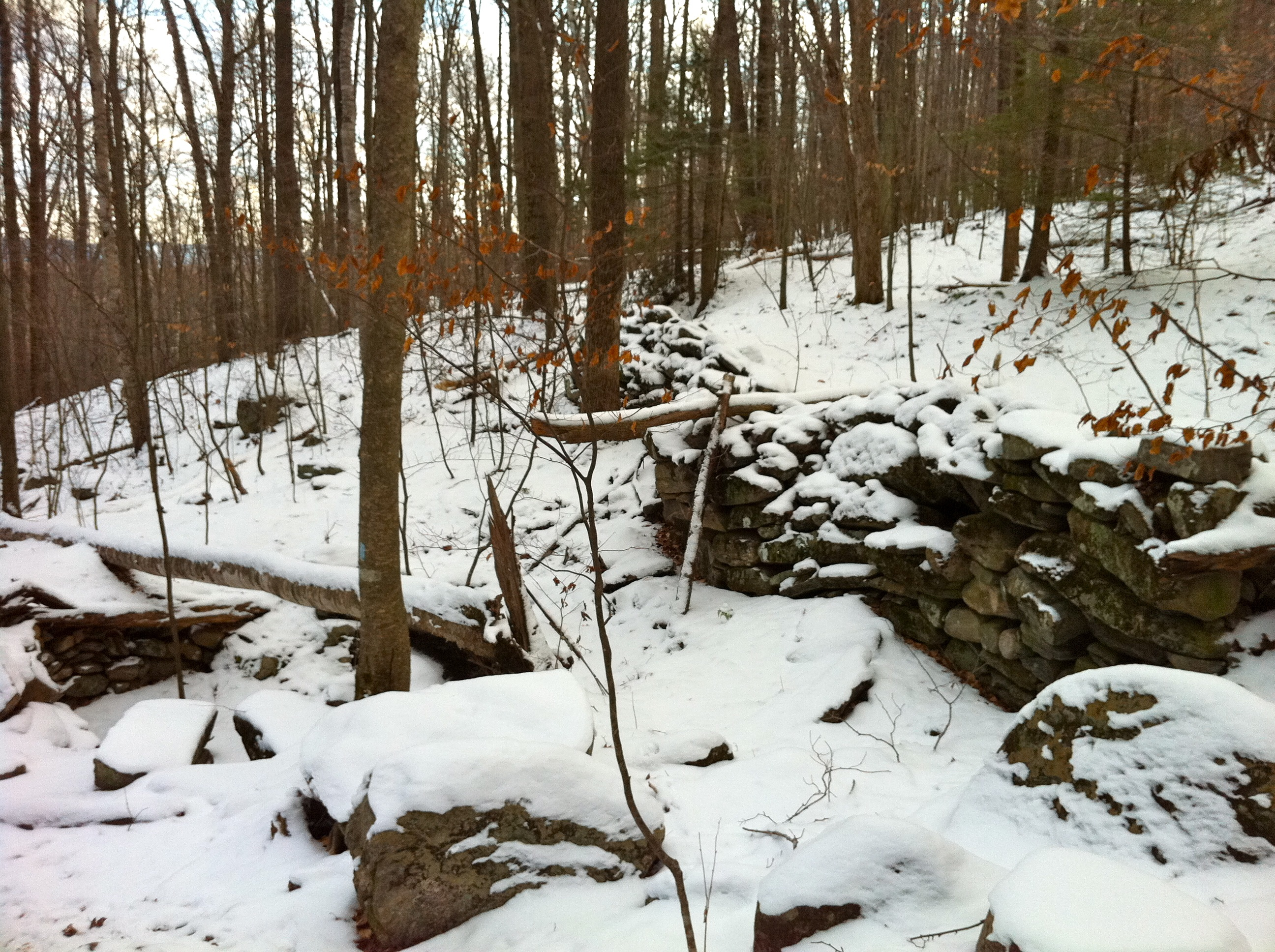
- American Legion State Park - Cheese-Box Mill Ruins along Henry Buck Trail, Barkhamsted, CT.
- Length: 3.18 miles (5.12 km)
- Location: Barkhamsted, Connecticut, USA
- Designation: CFPA Blue-Blazed Trail
- Use: hiking, cross-country skiing, snowshoeing, fishing, geocaching, other
- Hazards: hunters, deer ticks, poison ivy

The American Legion State Forest Trails is a system of Blue-Blazed hiking trails in the Pleasant Valley section of Barkhamsted, Connecticut. The trails, which collectively total 3.18 miles (5.12 km) in length, are entirely within American Legion State Forest.

The American Legion State Forest Trails consist of two official "Blue-Blazed" hiking trails:

- Henry Buck Trail (2.3 miles)
- Turkey Vulture Trail (0.88 mile)

== Trail description ==
The American Legion State Forest Trails are primarily used for hiking, backpacking, picnicking, and in the winter, snowshoeing.

Portions of the trails are suitable for, and are used for, cross-country skiing and geocaching. Site-specific activities enjoyed along the route include bird watching, hunting (very limited), fishing, horseback riding, bouldering and rock climbing (limited).

=== Trail communities ===
The official Blue-Blazed American Legion State Forest Trails pass through land completely located within Barkhamsted in the Paradise Valley area near the Riverton area.

== Historical Significance ==
The Blue-Blazed American Legion State Forest Trails, established by the Connecticut Forest and Park Association, offer hikers a journey through both natural beauty and rich historical landscapes. These trails wind past numerous sites of cultural and industrial significance, including old mills, a soapstone quarry, and various remnants of early industrial activity.

A notable feature along the trails is the Henry Buck Memorial Plaque, honoring Henry Buck, who served as vice president of the Connecticut Forest & Park Association from 1928 to 1930. This bronze plaque is uniquely situated, embedded in a cliff face along the Henry Buck Trail, which Buck himself designed.

The forest is dotted with structures dating back to the 1930s, built by the Civilian Conservation Corps (CCC). These include stone stairways, waterbars, and campsites. Hikers can also observe the ruins of a stone bridge that once linked American Legion and People's State Forests, a structure that fell victim to the powerful 1938 hurricane.

The trails provide fascinating glimpses into the area's industrial past. Along the Henry Buck Trail, visitors can explore the ruins of an early 19th-century cheese box factory, which once produced wooden containers for storing and transporting locally made cheese. Additionally, the trail network features several flat areas carved into hillsides, evidence of the region's historical charcoal production. These charcoal mounds stand as reminders of the area's significant role in supplying fuel for the iron and brass industries. These historical sites offer tangible connections to the forest's economic history, providing insights into the industrial practices that shaped the landscape over time.

=== Barkhamsted Lighthouse ===
Near the American Legion State Forest Trails lies the site of the Barkhamsted Lighthouse, a former multicultural settlement dating back to the mid-18th century. Now known as the Lighthouse Archaeological Site, this village consisted of people of African, Native, and Anglo-European heritages living on the fringes of mainstream society. The settlement was founded around 1740 by James Chaugham, a Narragansett Indian, and Mary Barber, a white woman from Wethersfield, Connecticut. The community grew over time, attracting diverse residents including freemen of African descent.

The name "Lighthouse" is said to have originated from stagecoach drivers who used to point out the light from the Chaugham's residence in the distance, likening it to a landlocked lighthouse.The Lighthouse community survived until the mid-19th century, leaving behind over a century of archaeological evidence. In 2008, the Connecticut Historic Preservation Council designated the area a State Archaeological Preserve, and it is also listed on the National Register of Historic Places.

While the Barkhamsted Lighthouse site is not directly on the American Legion State Forest Trails, its proximity and historical significance contribute to the rich cultural landscape of the area.

The route of the original (longer) trail blazed in the 1930s can be seen in the Connecticut Forest and Park Association's 1940 Connecticut Walk Book map of major trails.

== Hiking the trail ==
The two trails are blazed with blue rectangles. Trail descriptions are available from a number of commercial and non-commercial sources, and a complete guidebook is published by the Connecticut Forest and Park Association

The trails are regularly maintained, and are considered easy hiking, with very few sections of rugged and moderately difficult hiking.

Much of the trail is close to public roads. There are camping facilities in American Legion State Forest but camping is controlled and must be arranged.

Weather along the route is typical of Connecticut. Conditions on exposed ridge tops and summits may be harsher during cold or stormy weather. Lightning is a hazard on exposed summits and ledges during thunderstorms. Snow is common in the winter and may necessitate the use of snowshoes. Ice can form on exposed ledges and summits, making hiking dangerous without special equipment.

Biting insects can be bothersome during warm weather. Parasitic deer ticks (which are known to carry Lyme disease) are a potential hazard.

The trail is adjacent to, or is on lands where hunting and the use of firearms are permitted. Wearing bright orange clothing during the hunting season (Fall through December) is recommended.

== See also ==
- Blue-Blazed Trails
- Barkhamsted
