= Peoples State Forest Trails =

Hiking trail network in Connecticut, United States

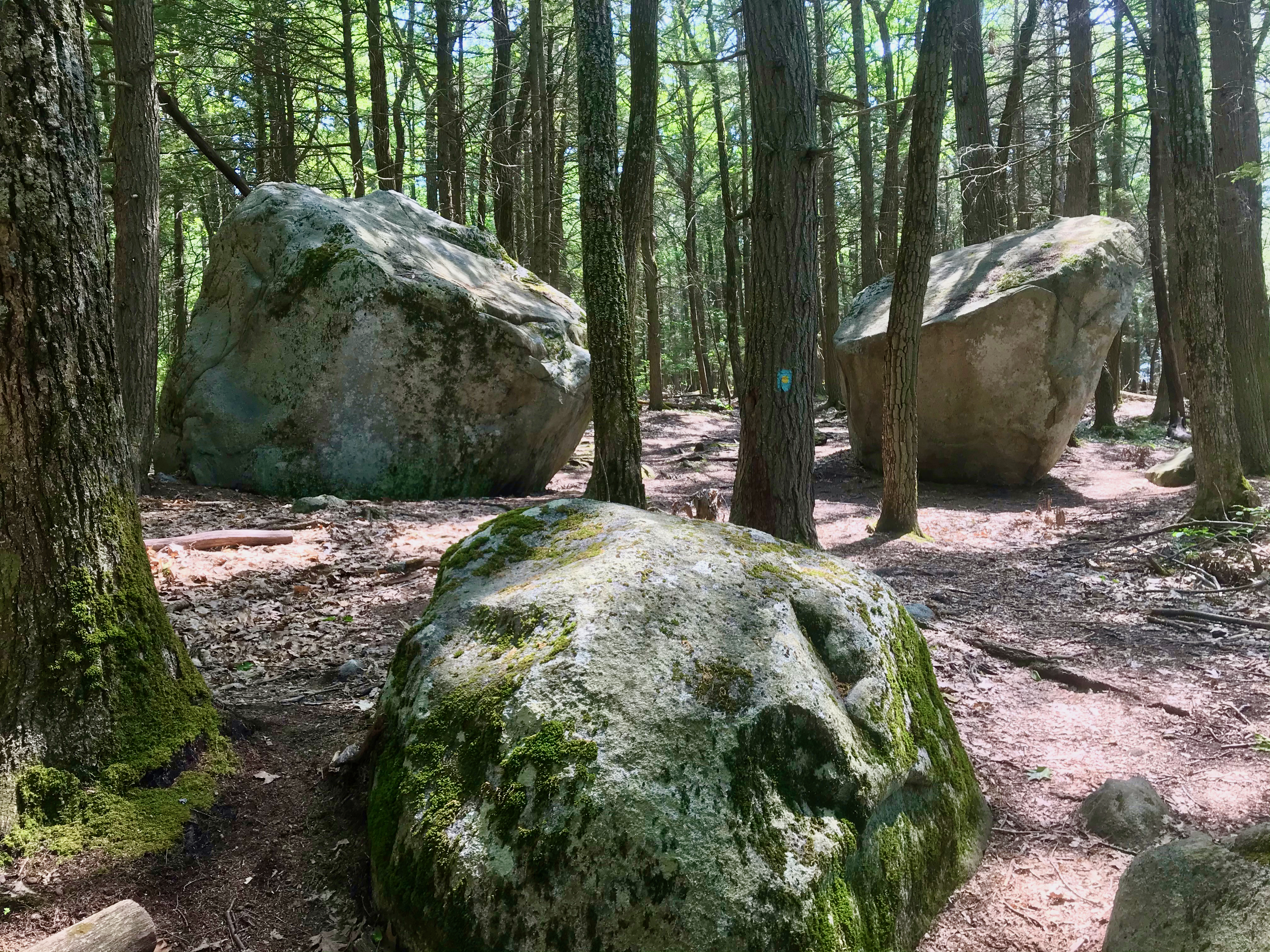
- Three erratic boulders on the Jesse Gerard Trail in Peoples State Forest.
- Length: 11.22 miles (18.06 km)
- Location: Barkhamsted, Connecticut, USA
- Designation: CFPA Blue-Blazed Trail
- Use: hiking, cross-country skiing, snowshoeing, fishing, geocaching, other
- Hazards: hunters, deer ticks, poison ivy

The Peoples State Forest Trails is a system of blue-blazed hiking trails in the Pleasant Valley section of Barkhamsted, Connecticut, United States. The trails, which collectively total 11.22 miles (18.06 km) in length, are entirely within Peoples State Forest.

The Peoples State Forest Trails consist of seven official "Blue-Blazed" hiking trails:

- Elliot Bronson Trail (2.02 miles, Blue & Red Blazed)
- Walt Landgraf Trail (0.5 miles, Red Blazed)
- Jessie Gerard Trail (1.8 miles, Blue & Yellow Blazed)
- Falls Cut-off Trail (0.2 miles, Blue & Red Blazed)
- Charles Pack Trail (1.9 miles, Blue & Yellow Blazed)
- Robert Ross Trail (2.2 miles, True Blue Blazed)
- Agnes Bowen Trail (2.6 miles, Blue & Orange Blazed)

== Trail description ==
The Peoples State Forest Trails are primarily used for hiking, backpacking, picnicking, and in the winter, snowshoeing.

Portions of the trails are suitable for, and are used for, cross-country skiing and geocaching. Site-specific activities enjoyed along the route include bird watching, hunting (very limited), fishing, horseback riding, bouldering and rock climbing (limited).

=== Trail communities ===
The official, Blue-Blazed Peoples State Forest Trails pass through land completely located within Barkhamsted in the Paradise Valley area near the Riverton area.

== History and folklore ==
The Blue-Blazed Peoples State Forest Trails were created by the Connecticut Forest and Park Association.

== Hiking the trail ==
The two trails are blazed with blue rectangles. Trail descriptions are available from a number of commercial and non-commercial sources, and a complete guidebook is published by the Connecticut Forest and Park Association

The trails are regularly maintained, and are considered easy hiking, with very few sections of rugged and moderately difficult hiking.

Much of the trail is close to public roads. There are no camping facilities in Peoples State Forest. There are camping facilities in the neighboring American Legion State Forest but camping is controlled and must be arranged.

Weather along the route is typical of Connecticut. Conditions on exposed ridge tops and summits may be harsher during cold or stormy weather. Lightning is a hazard on exposed summits and ledges during thunderstorms. Snow is common in the winter and may necessitate the use of snowshoes. Ice can form on exposed ledges and summits, making hiking dangerous without special equipment.

Biting insects can be bothersome during warm weather. Parasitic deer ticks (which are known to carry Lyme disease) are a potential hazard.

The trail is adjacent to, or is on lands where hunting and the use of firearms are permitted. Wearing bright orange clothing during the hunting season (Fall through December) is recommended.

When there is sufficient snow in the winter, the Whittmore Grove Cross Country Ski Area in Peoples State Forest provides a 0.75 mile "loop" cross country ski trail as well as a quarter mile "spur" cross country ski trail (which is a dirt forest road when there is no snow).

== See also ==
- Blue-Blazed Trails
- Barkhamsted
