= Peoples State Forest Nature Museum =

- Peoples Forest Museum
- U.S. National Register of Historic Places
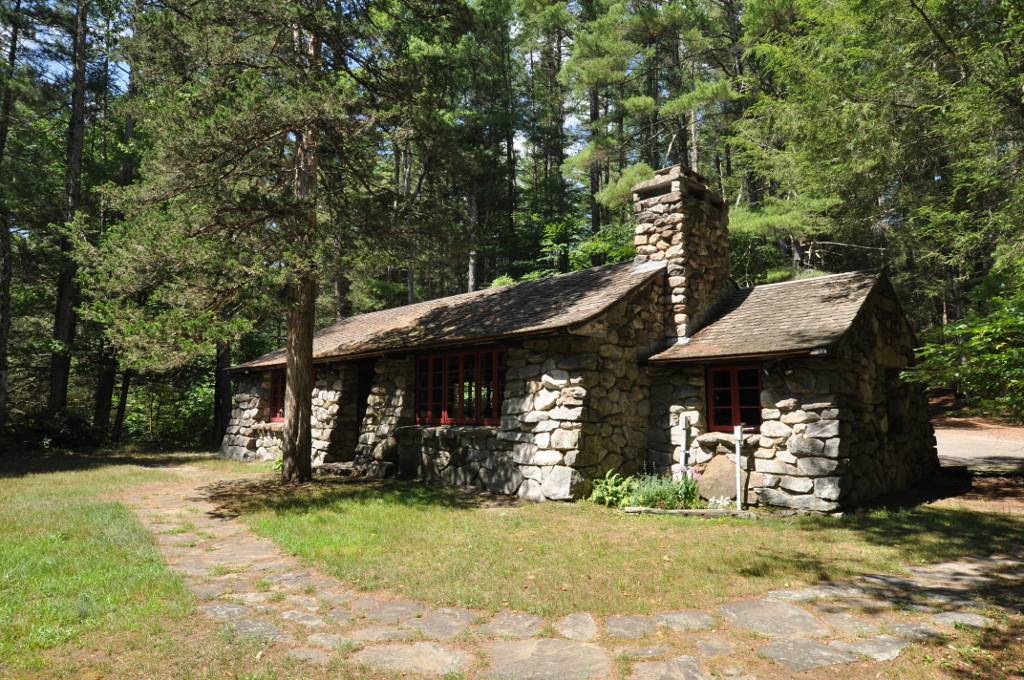

- Location within Connecticut Location within the United States
- Location: Greenwood Road, Peoples State Forest, Barkhamsted, Connecticut
- Coordinates: 41°55′31″N 72°59′50″W
- Area: 6.5 acres (2.6 ha)
- Built: 1935
- Built by: Civilian Conservation Corps
- Architectural style: Rustic
- MPS: Connecticut State Park and Forest Depression-Era Federal Work Relief Programs Structures TR
- NRHP reference No.: 86001737
- Added to NRHP: September 4, 1986

The Peoples State Forest Nature Museum is a state-run museum on Greenwood Road in the Peoples State Forest in Barkhamsted, Connecticut. It features displays on forestry, plants and animals native to Connecticut, local history, rocks and minerals, and insects. The museum is open seasonally from Friday through Monday. The rustic style building was constructed in 1935 by the Civilian Conservation Corps and was added to the National Register of Historic Places in 1986.

== Building history ==
The Peoples State Forest Nature Museum is located in the southern part of Peoples State Forest, which is located on the east side of the West Branch Farmington River. The museum is set in a clearing on the west side of Greenwood Road, a forest road providing vehicular access to the forest's interior. It is a single-story structure, built mainly out of rubblestone, with a bellcast gabled roof covered in wooden shingles. The main facade is oriented to the southwest, with large window openings flanking the main entrance. A small stone ell extends to the right, partly sandwiching a rubblestone chimney. The interior of the museum is finished with a bluestone floor, chestnut paneling on the walls, and exposed queenpost truss timber framing with wrought iron strapping for the roof.

The museum was built in 1934-35 by a crew of the Civilian Conservation Corps based across the river in American Legion State Forest, and was formally dedicated by Governor Wilbur Cross in 1935. It closed in the early 1950s, and was reopened in 1992 after standing unused for many years.

== See also ==
- National Register of Historic Places listings in Litchfield County, Connecticut
