= Beaver Meadow Complex Prehistoric Archeological District =

Archaeological site in Connecticut, United States

- U.S. National Register of Historic Places
- U.S. Historic district
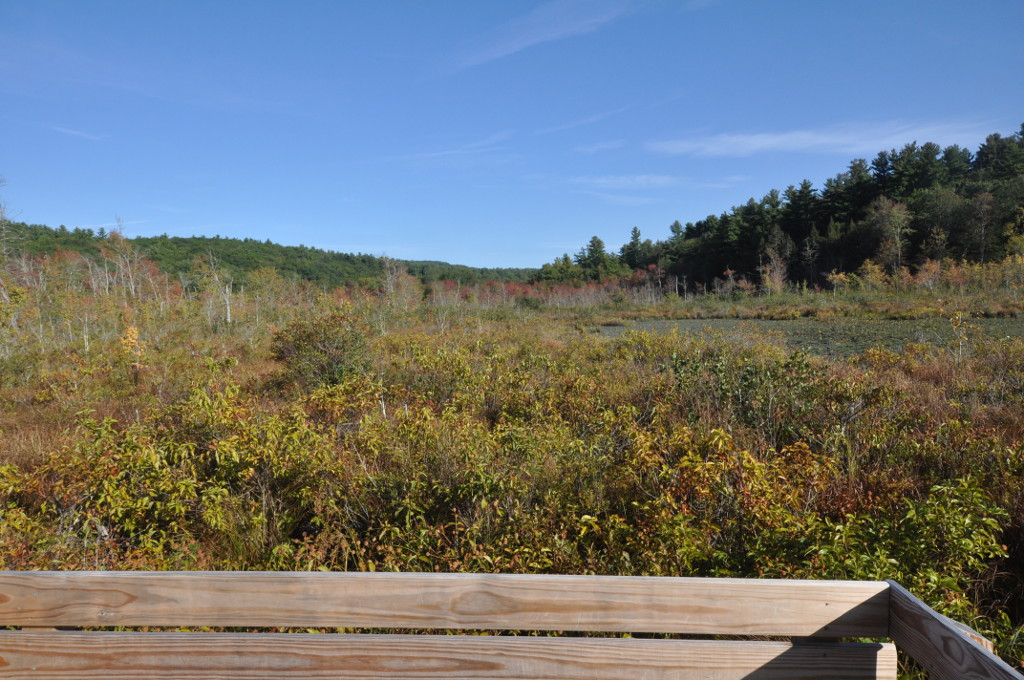
- Location: Peoples State Forest, Barkhamsted, Connecticut
- Area: 400 acres (160 ha)
- NRHP reference No.: 88000858
- Added to NRHP: September 21, 1988

The Beaver Meadow Complex Prehistoric Archeological District is a grouping of archaeological sites in Peoples State Forest, Barkhamsted, Connecticut. It consists of eight separate sites in the Beaver Meadow area of the forest, from which radiocarbon dates from the Archaic to the Middle and Late Woodland Period have been obtained. The sites were identified during surveys conducted 1983-85 by teams from Central Connecticut State University. This work was done as part of a larger scale survey of the Connecticut sections of the upper Farmington River valley.

The complex consists of a number of sites around the edges of Beaver Meadow, a large swampy area in the center of the state forest. Large numbers of stone tools, projectile points, and debitage (remains from stone tool manufacture) were recovered during the surveys of the 1980s. These objects were formed out of a variety of materials, including flint, slate, quartz, and hornfels. The quantity and type of tools found at these sites suggest that at least some of them were the result of long-term seasonal occupation, rather than temporary use as an upland hunting camp, which is a departure from other settlement areas of the period, which are normally found closer to rivers in this region. Hearth features were also found, which had burned seeds and nuts.

The complex was listed on the National Register of Historic Places in 1988.

== See also ==
- National Register of Historic Places listings in Litchfield County, Connecticut
