= American Legion State Forest =

Forest in Connecticut

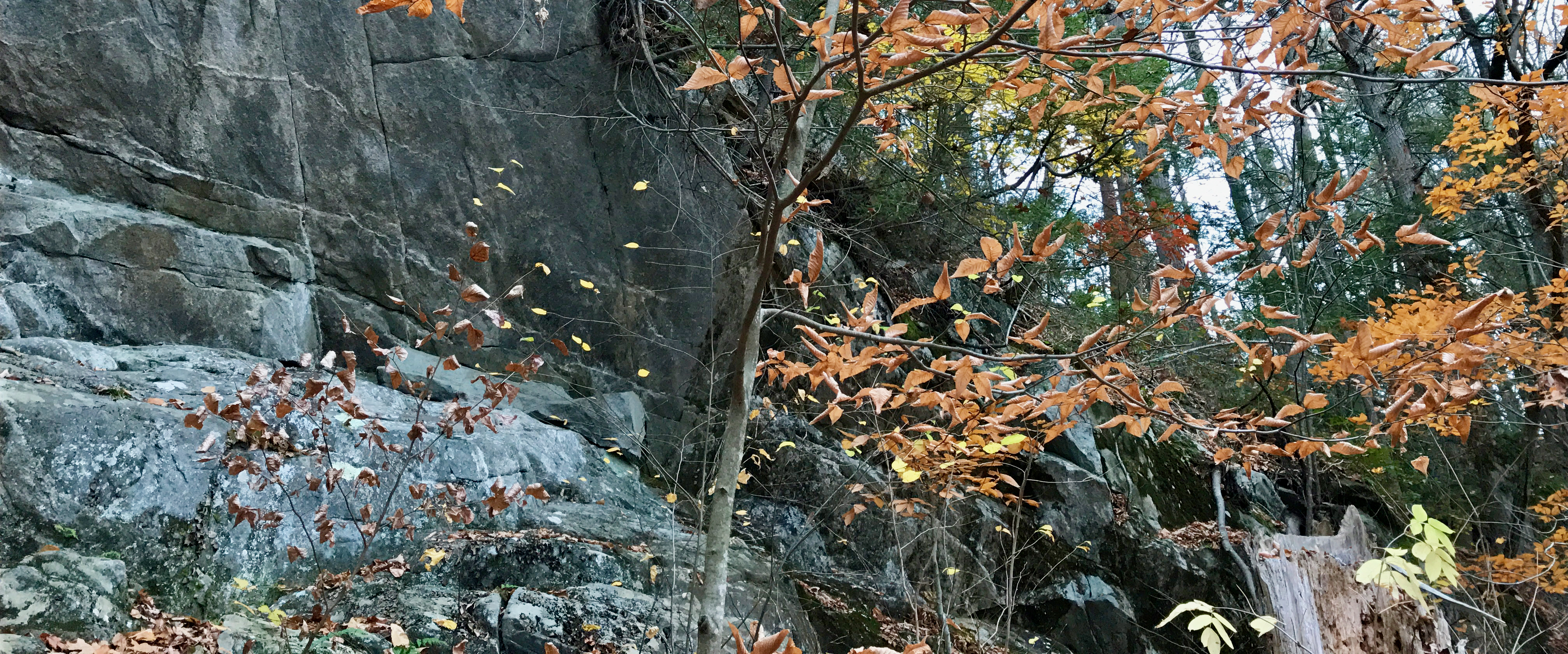
- Cliff face along Henry Buck Trail in American Legion State Forest.

- Location within Connecticut Location within the United States
- Location: Barkhamsted, Connecticut, United States
- Coordinates: 41°56′10″N 73°00′37″W
- Area: 1,304 acres (528 ha)
- Elevation: 594 ft (181 m)
- Established: 1927
- Administrator: Connecticut Department of Energy and Environmental Protection
- Website: Official website

American Legion State Forest is a Connecticut state forest that sits on the West Branch Farmington River opposite Peoples State Forest in the town of Barkhamsted.

== History ==
The forest's first 213 acres were given to the state by the American Legion in 1927. The forest was developed in the 1930s by the Civilian Conservation Corps.

== Activities and amenities ==
The forest's recreational offerings include canoeing on the Farmington River and hiking on the American Legion State Forest Trails system which includes the Henry Buck and Turkey Vultures Ledges trails. Camping is offered at the Austin F. Hawes Memorial Campground by the banks of the river.
