= Barkhamsted Center Historic District =

Historic district in Connecticut, United States

- U.S. National Register of Historic Places
- U.S. Historic district
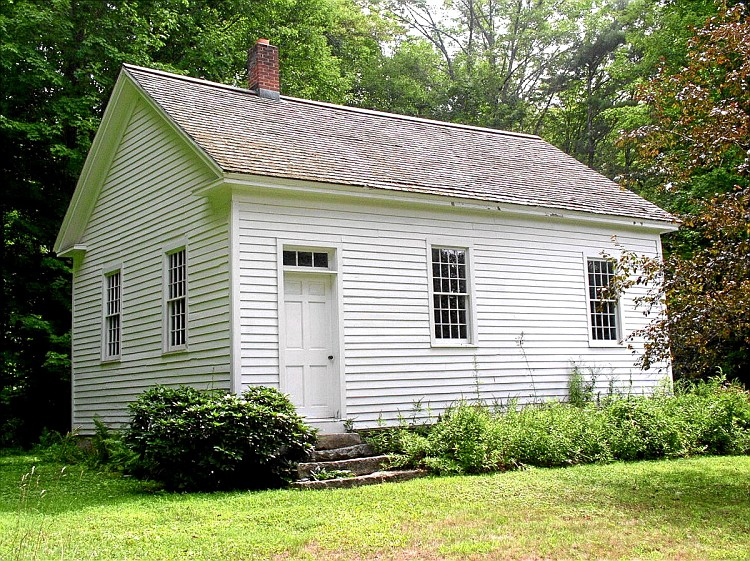
- Barkhamsted School House from 1821

- Location within Connecticut Location within the United States
- Location: 119, 131 Center Hill Road; 2,5,6,8 Old Town Hall Road, Barkhamsted, Connecticut
- Coordinates: 41.929722°N 72.966389°W
- Area: 12.7 acres (5.1 ha)
- Built: 1776
- Architectural style: Colonial, Greek Revival
- NRHP reference No.: 99001594
- Added to NRHP: December 22, 1999

Barkhamsted Center Historic District is a historic district at the intersection of Center Hill Road and Old Town Hall Road in Barkhamsted, Connecticut. It encompasses the surviving elements of Barkhamsted's original town center, most of which was flooded by the creation of Barkhamsted Reservoir in the early 20th century. The district was listed on the National Register of Historic Places in 1999.

== Description ==
Barkhamsted Center is located near the geographic center of the roughly rectangular town. It is set on the western shore of Barkhamsted Reservoir, centered at the junction of Center Hill Road, Day Road, and Old Town Hall Road. The latter road now comes to an end near the reservoir shoreline. Five of the district's six buildings are public in nature: they are a church and parsonage, school, the old town hall, and a former tavern. The Center Schoolhouse, built in 1821, was originally a two-story building; it was converted to one story about 1880. The first story was removed, keeping the second. The school was moved from its original location, very near the reservoir, to its current location on Center Hill Road in 1980. The school is now a museum run by the Barkhamsted Historical Society. The oldest building is the Nathaniel Collins House, a 1 1/2-story frame Colonial at 131 Center Hill Road.

== History ==
The town of Barkhamsted was incorporated in 1779, and has always had a rural character. It developed several small village centers, of which this one became the primary seat of civic activity. The town was divided in the 20th century by the creation of Barkhamsted Reservoir, serving the city of Hartford, on the East Branch Farmington River. The reservoir inundated much of the original village of Barkhamsted Center, and all of Barkhamsted Hollow. The town's civic center moved to the village of Pleasant Valley, and its main commercial center is now Riverton. As a result, the district shows the character of a rural mid 18th century community, now displaced by a 20th-century water supply reservoir.

== See also ==
- National Register of Historic Places listings in Litchfield County, Connecticut
