= Riverton Historic District =

Riverton Historic District may refer to:

- Riverton Historic District (Riverton, Connecticut), listed on the NRHP in Connecticut
- Riverton Historic District (Riverton, New Jersey), listed on the NRHP in New Jersey
- Riverton Historic District (Riverton, Utah), listed on the NRHP in Utah
- Riverton Historic District (Front Royal, Virginia), listed on the NRHP in Virginia
