= Union Church/St. Paul's Church =

Historic church in Connecticut, United States

- U.S. National Register of Historic Places
- U.S. Historic district – Contributing property
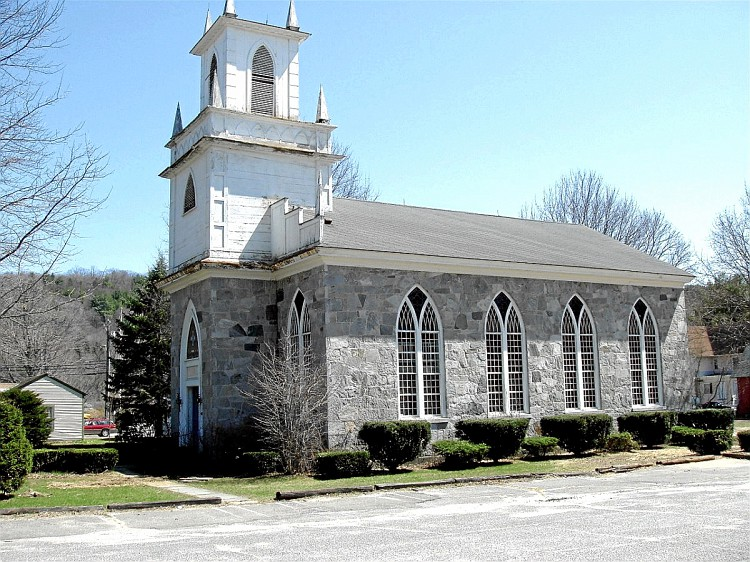

- Location within Connecticut Location within the United States
- Location: 3 Robertsville Road, Riverton, Connecticut
- Coordinates: 41°57′44″N 73°1′13″W
- Area: less than one acre
- Built: 1829
- Architectural style: Greek Revival, Gothic Revival
- Part of: Riverton Historic District (ID07000419)
- NRHP reference No.: 85000307

Significant dates
- Added to NRHP: February 21, 1985
- Designated CP: May 15, 2007

The Union Church/St. Paul's Church is a historic church building at 3 Robertsville Road in the Riverton section of Barkhamsted, Connecticut. Built in 1829 to be shared by multiple congregations, it is an architecturally distinguished example of Greek Revival design with Gothic features. It became an Episcopal church in 1880 which closed in 1971, and served for a time as a local history museum. It now houses a glass-blowing studio. The building was listed on the National Register of Historic Places in 1985.

== Description and history ==
The former Union Church/St. Paul's Church building is located on the west side of Riverton village, on the south side of Robertsville Road west of its junction with Riverton Road (Connecticut Route 20). It is a granite structure with Greek Revival proportions, but with tall Gothic Revival windows. A two-stage square tower projects from the main facade, with a stone lower stage topped by stages of wood with pinnacles at the corners. The walls are randomly coursed ashlar. The interior retains many original features despite its adaptive reuse in the later 20th century.

The church was built in 1829, originally to serve as a common meeting house for several Christian denominations. As they grew and built their own churches, this one declined, and was eventually converted to St. Paul's Episcopal Church in 1880. It served in this role until 1971, when it was sold to the revived Hitchcock Chair Company, who opened a museum. The museum closed in the early 2000s (along with the chair factory), and the church was then repurposed as a glass-blower's studio by Peter Greenwood.

== See also ==
- National Register of Historic Places listings in Litchfield County, Connecticut
