= Peoples State Forest =

State forest in Connecticut, United States

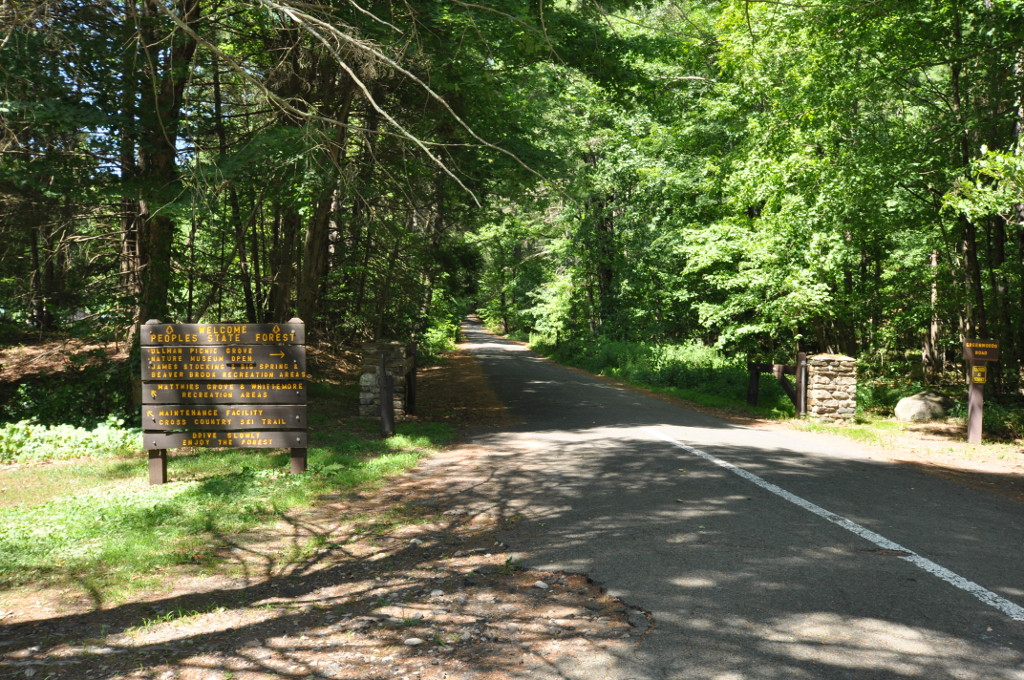
- The forest's entranceway

- Location within Connecticut Location within the United States
- Location: Barkhamsted, Connecticut, United States
- Coordinates: 41°56′46″N 72°59′27″W
- Area: 3,059 acres (1,238 ha)
- Elevation: 856 ft (261 m)
- Established: 1924
- Administrator: Connecticut Department of Energy and Environmental Protection
- Website: Official website

Peoples State Forest is a Connecticut state forest occupying 3,059 acres (1,238 ha) along the West Branch Farmington River opposite American Legion State Forest in the town of Barkhamsted. It is managed for forest products, wildlife habitat, and recreational uses that include hiking, hunting, fishing, and snowmobiling.

== History ==
The forest was dedicated in October 1924 with a riverside pageant attended by Governor Templeton and another 3,000 persons. The Civilian Conservation Corps made recreational improvements in the 1930s through the laying out of roads and trails and construction of a nature museum with an interior made of chestnut from trees killed by blight.

== Activities and amenities ==
Nature museum

The park features the Peoples State Forest Nature Museum, a stone-faced building built by the Civilian Conservation Corps in 1935 and listed on the National Register of Historic Places. The museum's focus on native flora and fauna includes animal mounts and skulls, minerals and insect specimens along with displays concerning area pioneers, Native Americans, logging, quarrying, and the Civilian Conservation Corps. The museum was open from 1935 to 1942. It reopened in 1992 under the name the Stone Museum. The name was changed back to the Peoples State Forest Nature Museum in 2007.

Trails

The forest has about ten miles (16 km) of trails in the blue-blazed Peoples State Forest Trails system.
