= Saville Dam =

Dam in Barkhamsted, Connecticut, United States

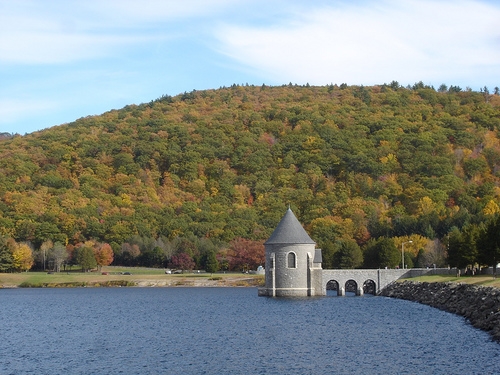
- Barkhamsted Reservoir, Saville Dam

- Location within Connecticut
- Location: Barkhamsted, Connecticut Hartland, Connecticut
- Coordinates: 41°54′36″N 72°57′17″W
- Opening date: 1940
- Operator: Metropolitan District Commission

Dam and spillways
- Impounds: Farmington River (Eastern branch)
- Height: 135 feet (41 m)
- Length: 1,950 feet (590 m)

Reservoir
- Creates: Barkhamsted Reservoir
- Total capacity: 36.8 billion US gallons (139,000,000 m^{3})
- Catchment area: 53.8 square miles (139 km^{2})
- Surface area: 4.2 square miles (11 km^{2})

Saville Dam is an earthen embankment dam with masonry work on the eastern branch of the Farmington River in southwestern Barkhamsted, Connecticut and central Hartland, Connecticut, dividing the latter into two villages along its hilltops, East and West Hartland. The dam is 135 ft. (41 m) tall and 1,950 ft. (590 m) long and has an uncontrolled spillway on its western portion. It creates the Barkhamsted Reservoir which has a volume of 36.8 billion US gallons (139,000,000 m^{3}) and is the primary water source for Hartford, Connecticut. Connecticut Route 318, also known as Saville Dam Road, crosses over the top of the dam.

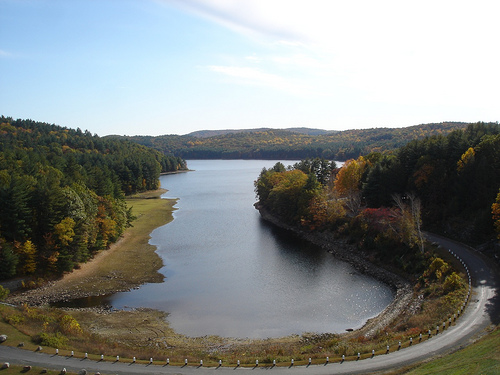
View of Lake McDonough from Saville Dam

In 1927, the Metropolitan District Commission began to purchase land in the present-day footprint of the dam and reservoir. Construction of the dam commenced in 1936 while land to the north was being stripped of lumber and buildings.

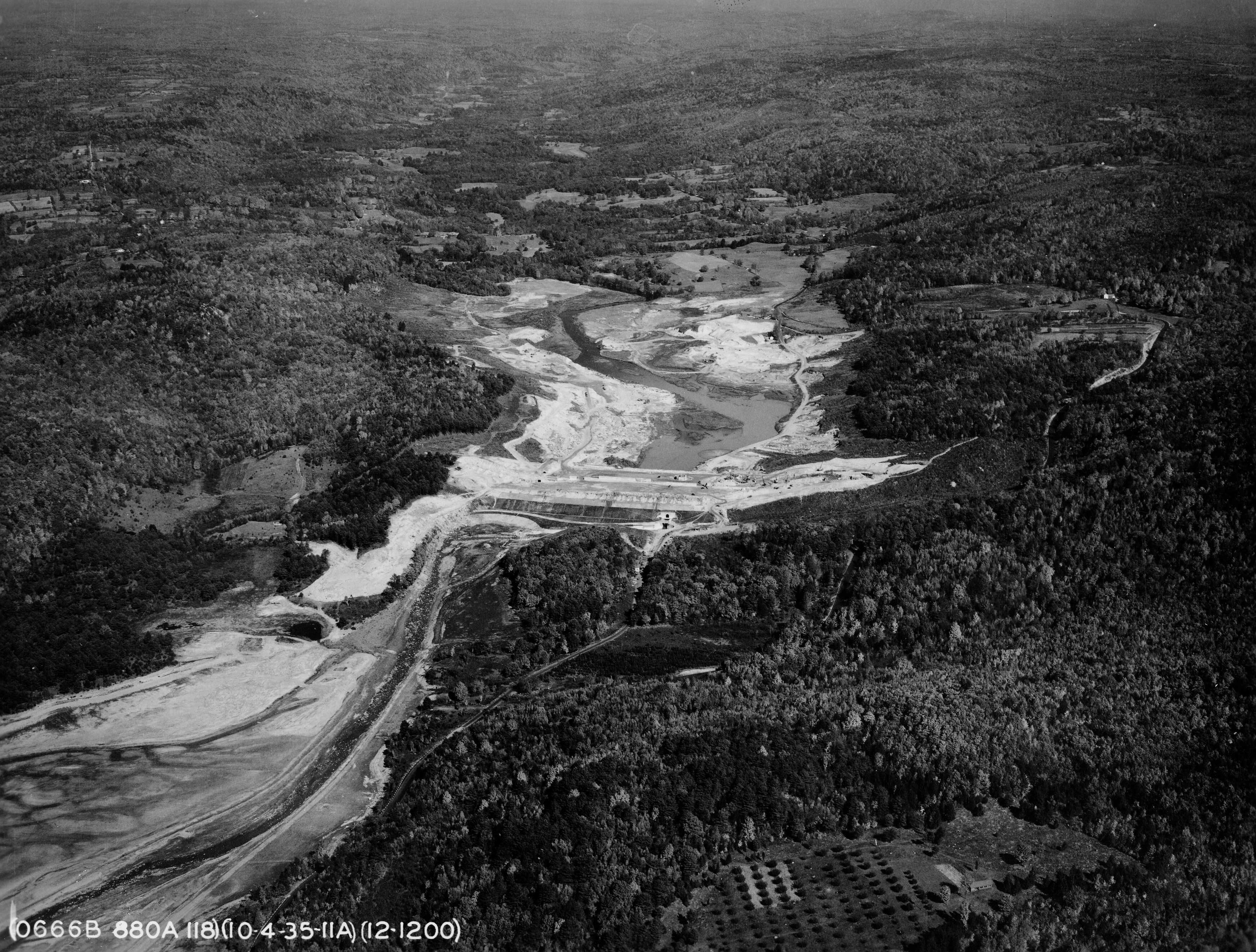
Construction of the Dam, 1935

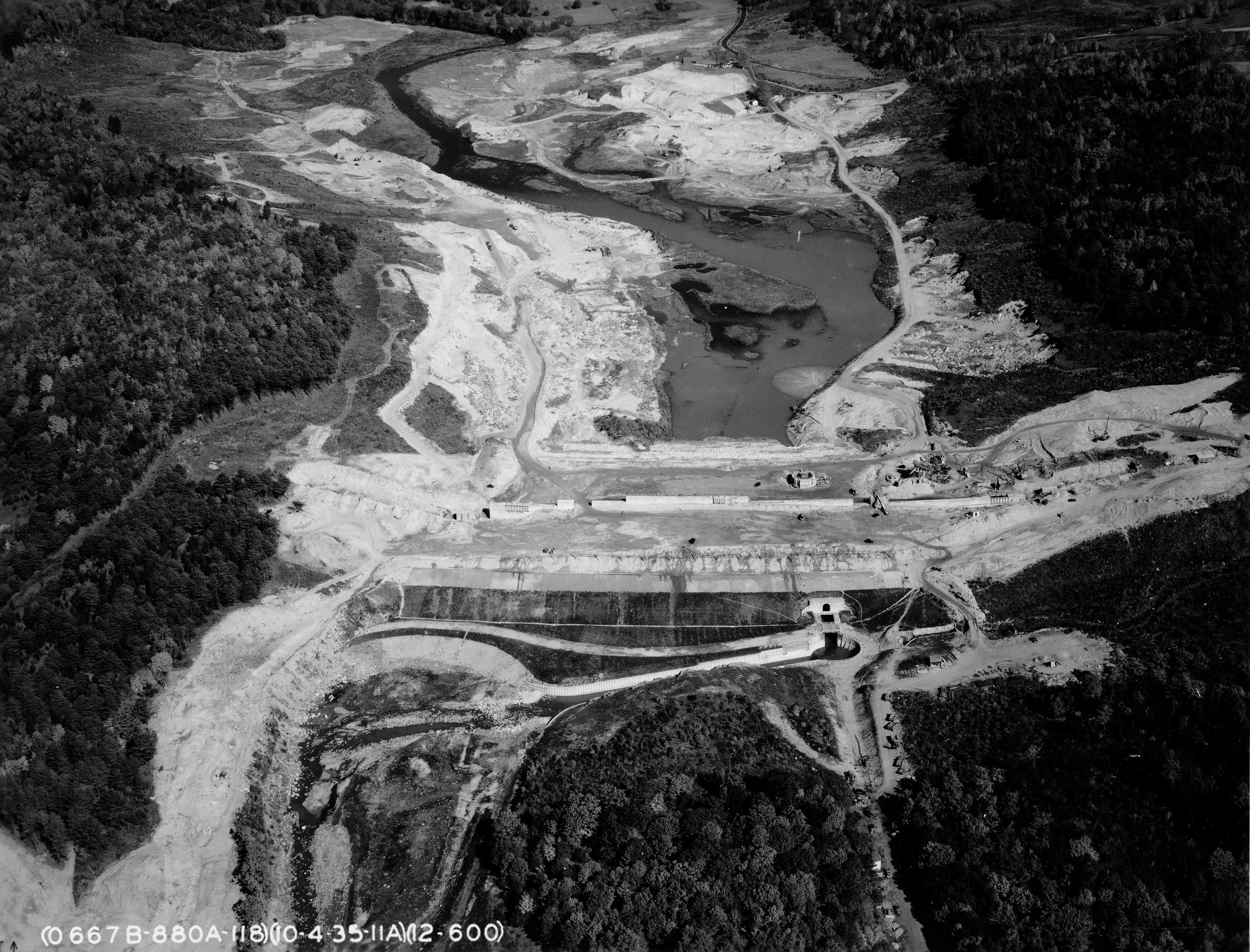
Dam construction, 1935

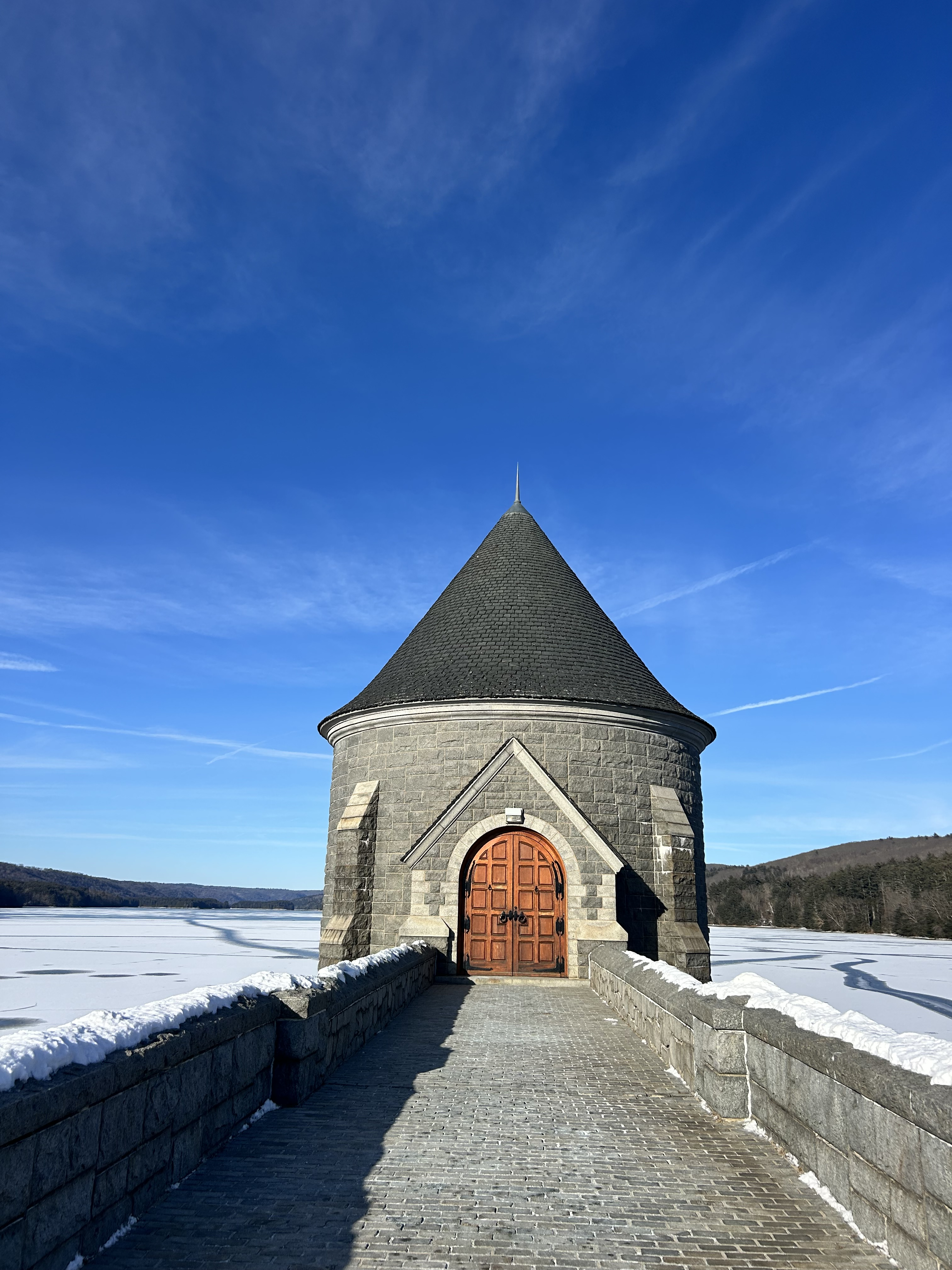
Saville Dam Gatehouse, 2026

Before the Metropolitan District Commission named the Saville Dam in 1940 in honor of its chief engineer, Caleb Mills Saville, it was referred to as the Bill's Brook Dam after the brook that ran near the site at the time.

The foundations for "Bill's Brook Dam" and the diversion tunnel for the East Branch of the Farmington River were completed in August 1934. Subsequently, the East Branch was diverted into the concrete conduit at the bottom of the Bill's Brook Dam site. The dam was completed in May 1940, at a total cost for dam and reservoir of $10M.

Although the Saville Dam was completed in 1940, it was not until 1948 that the Barkhamsted Reservoir finally filled to capacity. The Farmington River East Branch is impounded for nearly 8 miles (13 km) behind the dam, with the northernmost open waters of Barkhamsted Reservoir terminating in Hartland, Connecticut just south of the Massachusetts border.

The reservoir flooded many buildings and farms of Barkhamsted, including the village of Barkhamsted Hollow. The village of Barkhamsted Center, partially flooded, lies just to the west of the reservoir. Its remaining buildings are part of the Barkhamsted Center Historic District, listed on the National Register of Historic Places.

== See also ==
- Barkhamsted, Connecticut
- Barkhamsted Hollow, Connecticut
