= Riverton Historic District (Barkhamsted, Connecticut) =

Historic district in Connecticut, United States

- U.S. National Register of Historic Places
- U.S. Historic district
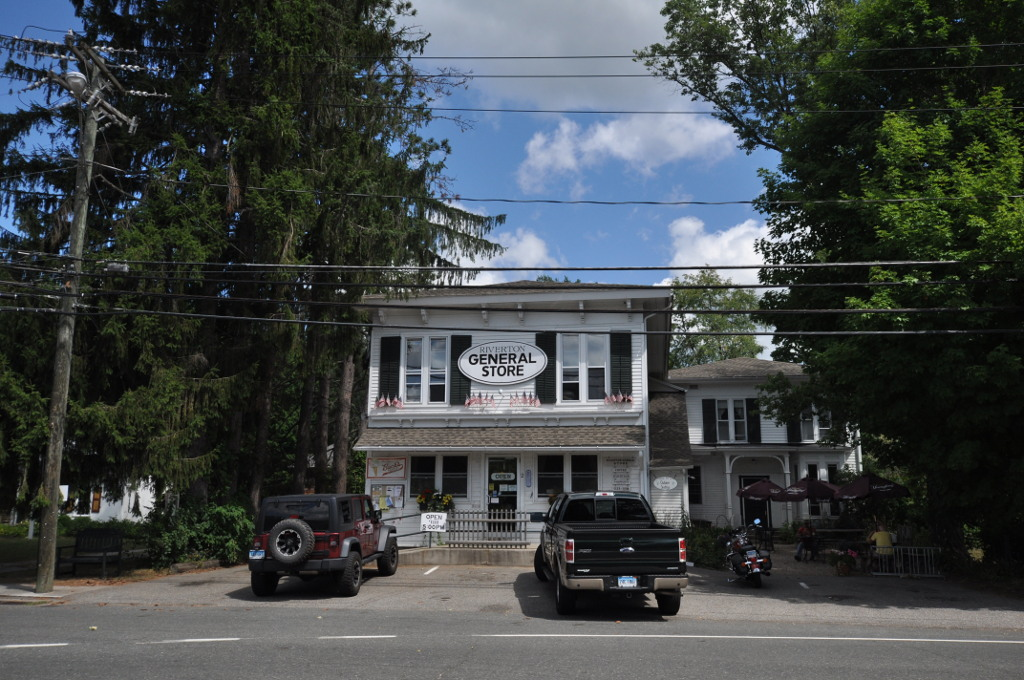
- Riverton General Store

- Location within Connecticut Location within the United States
- Location: Roughly bounded by Still and Farmington River and East River Road, Barkhamsted, Connecticut
- Coordinates: 41.961°N 73.018°W
- Area: 94 acres (38 ha)
- Architect: Deming, George G.; Wetmore, Willard S.
- Architectural style: Colonial, Early Republic
- NRHP reference No.: 07000419
- Added to NRHP: May 15, 2007

The Riverton Historic District is a historic district in the town of Barkhamsted, Connecticut that was listed on the National Register of Historic Places in 2007. It encompasses most of the historic 19th century industrial village of Riverton, whose mills were powered by the waters of the Still River and the East Branch Farmington River, which is located in the far Northwestern corner of the town.

== Description ==
Notable sites in Riverton include the post office, the Riverton General store, Sweetpea's Restaurant, Still River Antiques, Greenwood Glass Blowing Studio and Gallery (located in the former Union Church), and the Old Riverton Inn (separately listed on the National Register). Two major points of interest in Riverton are the Hitchcock Factory and the Sweet Shop, both of which closed down in the spring of 2006. The Hitchcock Chair Co. was reopened in September of 2011 and has a retail store in the village once again.

Riverton is also the site of the annual Riverton Fair, which takes place in early October of each year. The Riverton Fair is the last fair of the year in Connecticut.

== History ==
The town of Barkhamsted was first settled in the mid-18th century, mainly with small dispersed settlements along the rivers and ridges. The first house documented in what is now Riverton was built in 1789 by William Moore, Sr., and a bridge spanning the East Branch Farmington River was built in 1790. The bridge, the only crossing for miles in either direction, spurred growth of the village. The Old Riverton Inn was built in 1811, and still stands directly facing the bridge's eastern end. The village developed in the 19th century as a small industrial center, powered mainly by the chair manufactory of Lambert Hitchcock.

== See also ==
- National Register of Historic Places listings in Litchfield County, Connecticut
