= Pleasant Valley, Connecticut =

Census-designated place in Connecticut, United States

- Census-designated place
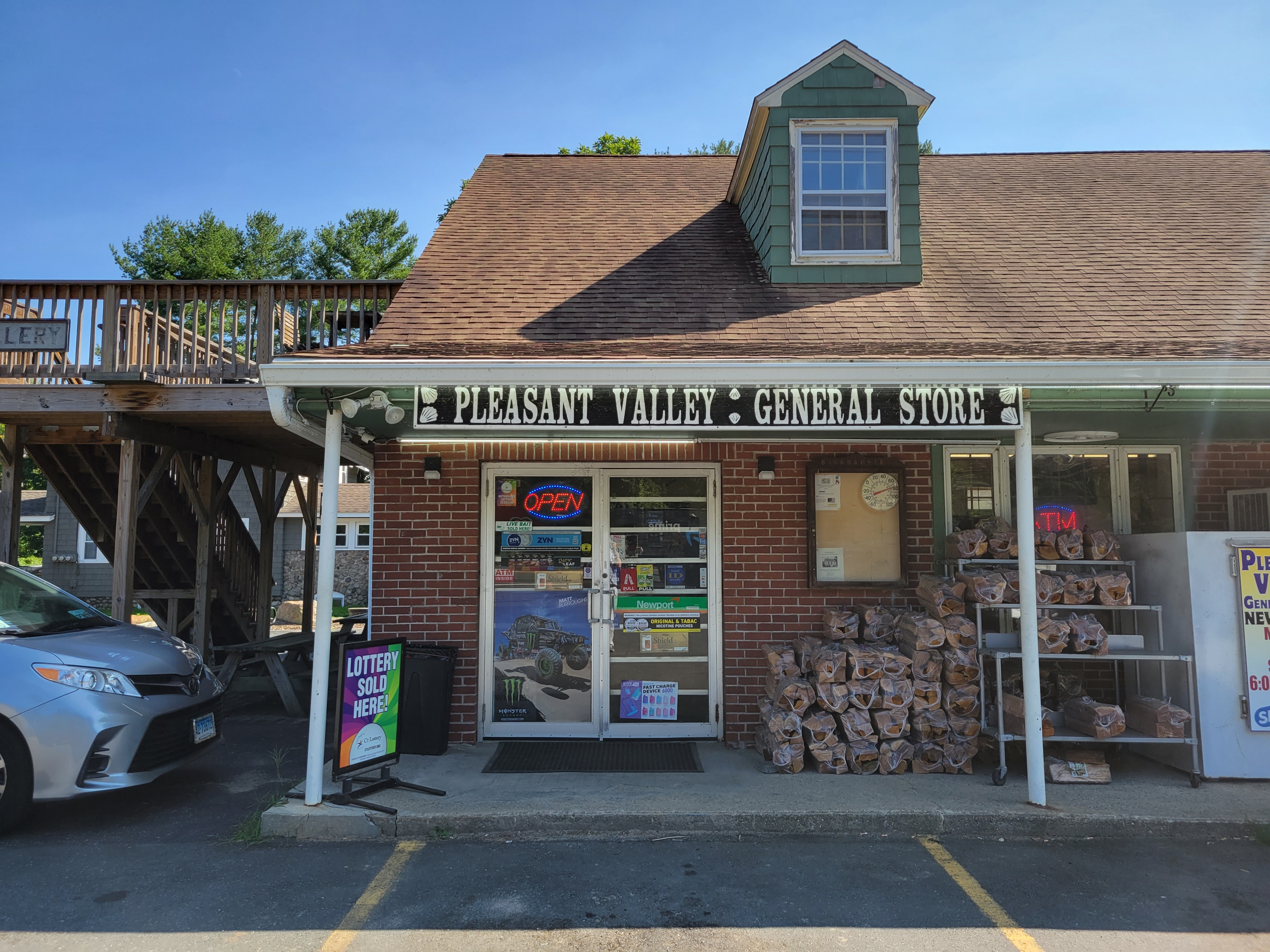
- Pleasant Valley General Store

- Location within Connecticut Location within the United States
- Coordinates: 41°54′43″N 72°59′23″W
- Country: United States
- State: Connecticut
- County: Litchfield
- Town: Barkhamsted

Area
  - Total: 0.51 sq mi (1.32 km^{2})
  - Land: 0.51 sq mi (1.32 km^{2})
  - Water: 0 sq mi (0.0 km^{2})
- Elevation: 428 ft (130 m)
- Time zone: UTC-5 (Eastern (EST))
  - Summer (DST): UTC-4 (EDT)
- ZIP Code: 06063 (Barkhamsted)
- Area codes: 860/959
- FIPS code: 09-60540
- GNIS feature ID: 2805983

Pleasant Valley is a census-designated place (CDP) in the town of Barkhamsted, Litchfield County, Connecticut, United States. As of the 2020 census, Pleasant Valley had a population of 161. It is in the southern part of the town, on the west side of the West Branch of the Farmington River.

Pleasant Valley was first listed as a CDP prior to the 2020 census.

== Education ==
It is in the Barkhamsted School District.
