= Lambert Hitchcock =

American furniture manufacturer (1795–1852)

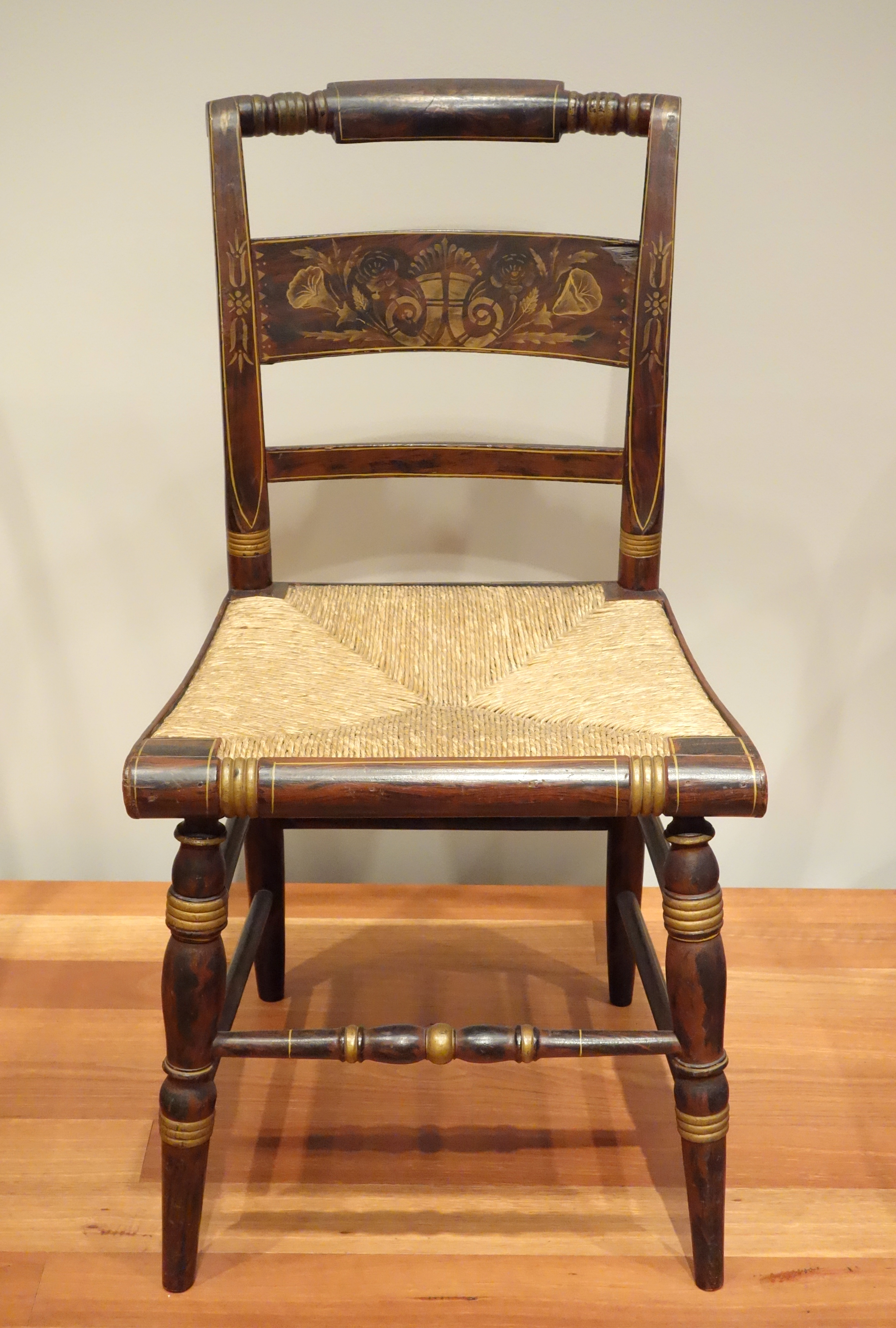
Side chair by Lambert Hitchcock, 1826-1829

Lambert Hitchcock (May 28, 1795, Cheshire, Connecticut – 1852) was an American furniture manufacturer, famous for designing and mass-producing the Hitchcock chair.

Hitchcock was the son of John Lee Hitchcock, an American Revolutionary War veteran who was lost at sea in 1811. He attended the Episcopal Academy of Cheshire, now known as Cheshire Academy, and was an apprentice to woodworker Silas Cheney. In 1818, he opened a furniture factory in Riverton, Connecticut, then called Hitchcocksville. The factory at first made chair parts. Soon Hitchcock, influenced by Connecticut clockmaker Eli Terry, began mass-producing simple, affordable chairs. Instead of painting designs on the backs, he used the relatively new and easier technique of stenciling. By the late 1820s, the Hitchcock Chair Company was producing over 15,000 chairs a year.

Although an innovative manufacturer, Hitchcock was an unsuccessful businessman. His company went through receivership in 1832, with his brothers-in-law joining the business under the name Hitchcock, Alford & Co. In 1843, he sold his interest in the company and started a new company in Unionville, Connecticut, which also failed. He died in 1852 with little money to his name.

In 1946, John Tarrant Kenney came upon the abandoned Hitchcock Chair factory while fishing on the Farmington River. He wrote a biography, The Hitchcock Chair, and started a new Hitchcock Chair Company in the same location. That business lasted until 2006, when it was forced to close due to competition from low-cost overseas furniture manufacturers. In the spring of 2010, Rick Swenson and his business partner, Gary Hath, purchased the Hitchcock name, plans, and artwork, and began producing chairs.
