= Barkhamsted, Connecticut =

- Town
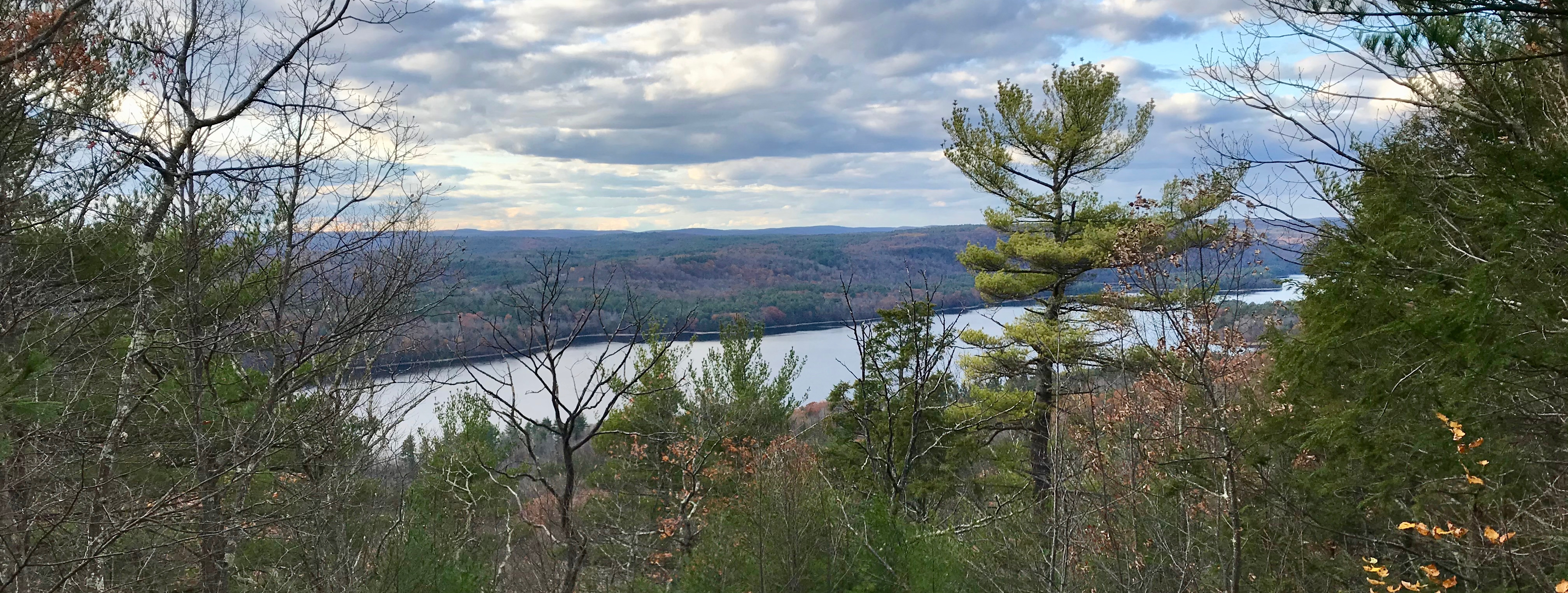
- View of the Barkhamsted Reservoir

- Seal

- Interactive map of Barkhamsted, Connecticut
- Coordinates: 41°55′45″N 72°58′20″W
- Country: United States
- U.S. state: Connecticut
- County: Litchfield
- Region: Northwest Hills
- Incorporated: 1779

Government
  - Type: Selectman-town meeting
  - First Selectman: Donald S. Stein (D)
  - Selectman: Raymond P. Pech (D)
  - Selectman: Nicholas A. Lukiwsky (R)

Area
  - Total: 38.8 sq mi (100.6 km^{2})
  - Land: 36.3 sq mi (93.9 km^{2})
  - Water: 2.6 sq mi (6.7 km^{2})
- Elevation: 607 ft (185 m)

Population (2020)
  - Total: 3,647
  - Density: 100/sq mi (38.8/km^{2})
- Time zone: UTC−5 (Eastern)
  - Summer (DST): UTC−4 (Eastern)
- ZIP code: 06063, 06065
- Area codes: 860/959
- FIPS code: 09-02760
- GNIS feature ID: 0213386
- Website: barkhamsted.us

Barkhamsted (/bɑːrkˈhæmstɛd/ bark-HAM-sted) is a town in Litchfield County, Connecticut, United States. It contains seven villages: West Hill, Mallory, Barkhamsted Center, Center Hill, Washington Hill, Pleasant Valley, and Riverton. The population was 3,647 at the 2020 census, down from 3,799 at the 2010 census. The town is part of the Northwest Hills Planning Region. Barkhamsted was first incorporated in 1779, and named after Berkhamsted, Hertfordshire, England.

== Geography ==
The town is in northeastern Litchfield County and is bordered to the north and east by Hartford County. According to the United States Census Bureau, the town has a total area of 42.7 square miles (110.6 km^{2}), of which 36.3 square miles (93.9 km^{2}) are land and 2.6 square miles (6.7 km^{2}), or 6.63%, are water. Major bodies of water include Barkhamsted Reservoir, the primary water source for Hartford; Lake McDonough, and the Farmington River. The north end of West Hill Lake is located at the southern border of Barkhamsted. A high percentage of the land in the town is owned by the state of Connecticut as state forest (Peoples State Forest, American Legion State Forest, Tunxis State Forest, and Enders State Forest) and by the Metropolitan District Commission (MDC) as water supply area.

U.S. Route 44 crosses the southwestern part of the town, leading southeast 22 miles (35 km) to Hartford and northwest 20 miles (32 km) to North Canaan.

=== Principal communities ===
- Barkhamsted Center
- Barkhamsted Hollow (historical; became the Barkhamsted Reservoir in the early 20th century)
- Center Hill
- Pleasant Valley
- Riverton
- West Hill

=== Climate ===
Climate data for Barkhamsted, Connecticut (2000–2020 temperature normals, extremes 2000-present, 1991-2020 precipitation normals)
Month	Jan	Feb	Mar	Apr	May	Jun	Jul	Aug	Sep	Oct	Nov	Dec	Year
Record high °F (°C)	68 (20)	78 (26)	80 (27)	93 (34)	95 (35)	97 (36)	99 (37)	99 (37)	96 (36)	87 (31)	79 (26)	70 (21)	99 (37)
Mean maximum °F (°C)	55 (13)	57 (14)	66 (19)	81 (27)	89 (32)	92 (33)	94 (34)	92 (33)	88 (31)	79 (26)	70 (21)	59 (15)	96 (36)
Mean daily maximum °F (°C)	34.2 (1.2)	37.0 (2.8)	45.5 (7.5)	59.3 (15.2)	70.0 (21.1)	78.4 (25.8)	84.2 (29.0)	82.3 (27.9)	75.7 (24.3)	62.6 (17.0)	50.9 (10.5)	39.3 (4.1)	59.4 (15.2)
Daily mean °F (°C)	24.9 (−3.9)	26.6 (−3.0)	34.7 (1.5)	47.1 (8.4)	58.1 (14.5)	67.1 (19.5)	72.8 (22.7)	70.9 (21.6)	64.0 (17.8)	51.7 (10.9)	40.9 (4.9)	30.6 (−0.8)	48.6 (9.2)
Mean daily minimum °F (°C)	15.7 (−9.1)	16.3 (−8.7)	23.9 (−4.5)	34.9 (1.6)	46.2 (7.9)	55.8 (13.2)	61.5 (16.4)	59.5 (15.3)	52.3 (11.3)	40.8 (4.9)	31.0 (−0.6)	21.9 (−5.6)	37.8 (3.2)
Mean minimum °F (°C)	−4 (−20)	−1 (−18)	6 (−14)	23 (−5)	31 (−1)	43 (6)	51 (11)	49 (9)	38 (3)	27 (−3)	16 (−9)	7 (−14)	−6 (−21)
Record low °F (°C)	−12 (−24)	−20 (−29)	−8 (−22)	16 (−9)	8 (−13)	37 (3)	38 (3)	44 (7)	29 (−2)	19 (−7)	2 (−17)	−4 (−20)	−20 (−29)
Average precipitation inches (mm)	3.57 (91)	3.21 (82)	4.09 (104)	3.89 (99)	3.94 (100)	4.85 (123)	4.52 (115)	4.31 (109)	4.75 (121)	5.18 (132)	3.83 (97)	4.58 (116)	50.84 (1,291)
Average snowfall inches (cm)	14.3 (36)	14.2 (36)	9.3 (24)	0.8 (2.0)	0 (0)	0 (0)	0 (0)	0 (0)	0 (0)	0.4 (1.0)	2.0 (5.1)	9.2 (23)	47.9 (122)
Average extreme snow depth inches (cm)	9 (23)	10 (25)	10 (25)	1 (2.5)	0 (0)	0 (0)	0 (0)	0 (0)	0 (0)	0 (0)	1 (2.5)	7 (18)	15 (38)
Average precipitation days (≥ 0.01 in)	11	9	10	11	13	12	12	10	10	11	10	11	132
Average snowy days (≥ 0.1 in)	5	5	3	1	0	0	0	0	0	0	1	3	18
Source: NOAA

== Demographics ==
Historical population
Census	Pop.	Note	%±
1820	1,592		—
1850	1,524		—
1860	1,272		−16.5%
1870	1,439		13.1%
1880	1,297		−9.9%
1890	1,130		−12.9%
1900	864		−23.5%
1910	865		0.1%
1920	719		−16.9%
1930	697		−3.1%
1940	724		3.9%
1950	946		30.7%
1960	1,370		44.8%
1970	2,066		50.8%
1980	2,935		42.1%
1990	3,369		14.8%
2000	3,494		3.7%
2010	3,799		8.7%
2020	3,647		−4.0%
U.S. Decennial Census

As of 2010, Barkhamsted had a population of 3,799. The racial composition of the population was 97.5% white, 0.3% black or African American, 0.6% Asian, 0.6% from some other race and 1.1% reporting two or more races. 1.5% of the population was Hispanic or Latino of any race.

As of the census of 2000, there were 3,494 people, 1,334 households, and 1,036 families residing in the town. The population density was 96.5 inhabitants per square mile (37.3/km^{2}). There were 1,436 housing units at an average density of 39.6 per square mile (15.3/km^{2}). The racial makeup of the town was 98.54% White, 0.06% African American, 0.17% Native American, 0.40% Asian, 0.29% from other races, and 0.54% from two or more races. Hispanic or Latino of any race were 0.89% of the population.

There were 1,334 households, out of which 36.2% had children under the age of 18 living with them, 68.2% were married couples living together, 6.2% had a female householder with no husband present, and 22.3% were non-families. 16.9% of all households were made up of individuals, and 4.9% had someone living alone who was 65 years of age or older. The average household size was 2.62 and the average family size was 2.95.

In the town, the population was spread out, with 25.0% under the age of 18, 4.8% from 18 to 24, 31.3% from 25 to 44, 28.8% from 45 to 64, and 10.1% who were 65 years of age or older. The median age was 40 years. For every 100 females, there were 101.3 males. For every 100 females age 18 and over, there were 100.8 males.

The median income for a household in the town was $65,972, and the median income for a family was $73,218. Males had a median income of $51,925 versus $38,102 for females. The per capita income for the town was $28,961. About 1.8% of families and 3.0% of the population were below the poverty line, including 3.8% of those under age 18 and 1.4% of those age 65 or over.

== Politics ==
Since voting predominantly Republican from 1956 through 1988, Barkhamsted has oscillated between the two major parties at the presidential level.

Voter registration and party enrollment as of October 29, 2019
Party	Active voters	Inactive voters	Total voters	Percentage
Republican	884	18	902	30.88%
Democratic	705	15	720	24.65%
Unaffiliated	1,216	37	1,253	42.90%
Minor Parties	44	2	46	1.57%
Total	2,849	72	2,921	100%

Presidential Election Results
Year	Democratic	Republican	Third Parties
2020	47.3% 1,154	50.3% 1,228	2.4% 60
2016	41.3% 905	52.8% 1,157	5.9% 131
2012	49.1% 1,033	49.1% 1,033	1.8% 39
2008	54.6% 1,223	43.2% 969	2.2% 50
2004	52.0% 1,124	46.1% 995	1.9% 42
2000	48.0% 832	44.7% 832	7.3% 136
1996	43.3% 735	39.9% 677	16.8% 285
1992	41.7% 779	31.7% 779	26.6% 496
1988	47.9% 772	50.8% 820	1.3% 21
1984	31.2% 467	68.6% 1,026	0.2% 3
1980	27.4% 389	53.2% 755	19.4% 275
1976	38.7% 473	60.8% 742	0.5% 6
1972	31.1% 345	67.8% 750	1.1% 12
1968	37.3% 295	55.6% 439	7.1% 56
1964	53.2% 348	46.8% 306	0.00% 0
1960	32.3% 219	67.7% 458	0.00% 0
1956	16.8% 89	83.2% 440	0.00% 0

== Services ==
The town of Barkhamsted has one elementary school, in the village of Pleasant Valley.

Its high school and middle school students attend Northwestern Regional Middle School and Northwestern Regional High School, of the Northwestern Regional School District No. 7, in neighboring Winsted. Barkhamsted schoolchildren attend the Regional High/Middle School with students from three neighboring towns, New Hartford, Norfolk, and Colebrook.

Barkhamsted has three fire departments: the Pleasant Valley Volunteer Fire Department, Riverton Volunteer Fire Company, and Barkhamsted East Volunteer Fire Company. The town employs one paid daytime driver/firefighter to assist the volunteers during normal work hours.

Emergency medical care is provided by the Winsted Area Ambulance Association, the New Hartford Volunteer Ambulance Association, and a Campion paramedic. Both Winsted and New Hartford are volunteer-based services.

== Transportation ==
There is no public transportation in Barkhamsted; thus, the principal means of transportation is the automobile. The primary state highways in town are Route 44, Route 20, Route 219, Route 318, and Route 181. The village of Riverton is located along Route 20 and the village of Pleasant Valley is off Route 44 (via Route 318). Bradley International Airport is approximately 15 miles east.

== Notable locations ==
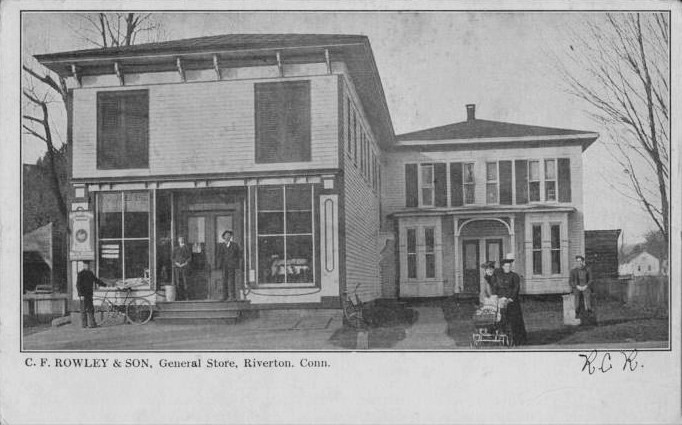
A general store in 1906 in Riverton

Barkhamsted is home of the historic Saville Dam, forming Barkhamsted Reservoir, and Peoples State Forest, where the Stone Museum is located.

Within the Barkhamsted Reservoir lie the foundations of Barkhamsted Hollow, the historic center of town that was purchased by the Metropolitan District Commission of Connecticut in the early 20th century to create a reservoir to serve the Hartford area. This area was flooded following the construction of the Saville Dam on the East Branch of the Farmington River, and took eight years to fill.

Just south of the Barkhamsted Reservoir is Lake McDonough, also known as the compensating reservoir and owned by the MDC. Originally created to ensure the riparian rights of downstream mill owners, this lake now serves the recreational interests of the surrounding area with beaches, boating, and fishing.

The hamlet of Pleasant Valley contains the Pleasant Valley General Store, the Barkhamsted Elementary School, the Pleasant Valley Drive-In, the post office (ZIP Code 06063), and the town hall.

The hamlet of Riverton holds a post office (ZIP Code 06065), the Riverton General Store, the Riverton Inn, the Royal Coachman Tavern, the Riverton Congregational Church, the grange, and the fair grounds. This is also the location of the annual Riverton Fair, which takes place the second weekend of October each year, and is Connecticut's last fair of the year.

The West Branch of the Farmington River is designated as a Wild and Scenic River. It runs through the villages of Riverton and Pleasant Valley and hosts fishermen year-round in the catch-and-release section. On the opening day of fishing season each year, a fishing tournament is held in Riverton, drawing anglers from Connecticut, New York, and Massachusetts.

=== On the National Register of Historic Places ===
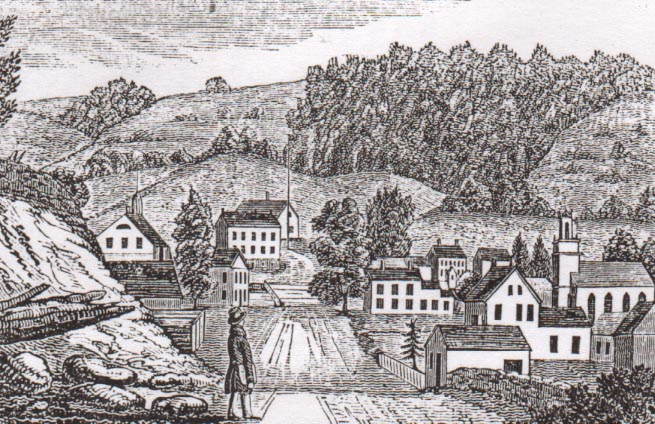
"West view of Hitchcocksville, Barkhamsted" by John Warner Barber, 1830s

- American Legion Forest CCC Shelter – west side of West River Road, American Legion State Forest (added in 1986)
- Barkhamsted Center Historic District – 119, 131 Center Hill Road; 2,5,6,8 Old Town Hall Road (added in 1999)
- Beaver Meadow Complex Prehistoric Archeological District (added in 1988)
- Lighthouse Archeological Site (5-37) (added in 1991)
- William Moore Jr. House – 5 Mountain Road (added May 14, 1999)
- Old Riverton Inn – 436 E. River Rd. (added in 1992)
- Peoples Forest Museum – Greenwood Road, Peoples State Forest (added in 1986)
- Riverton Historic District – (added in 2007)
- Union Church/St. Paul's Church – Riverton Road (added in 1985)
