= Riverton, Connecticut =

Census-designated place in Connecticut, United States

- Census-designated place
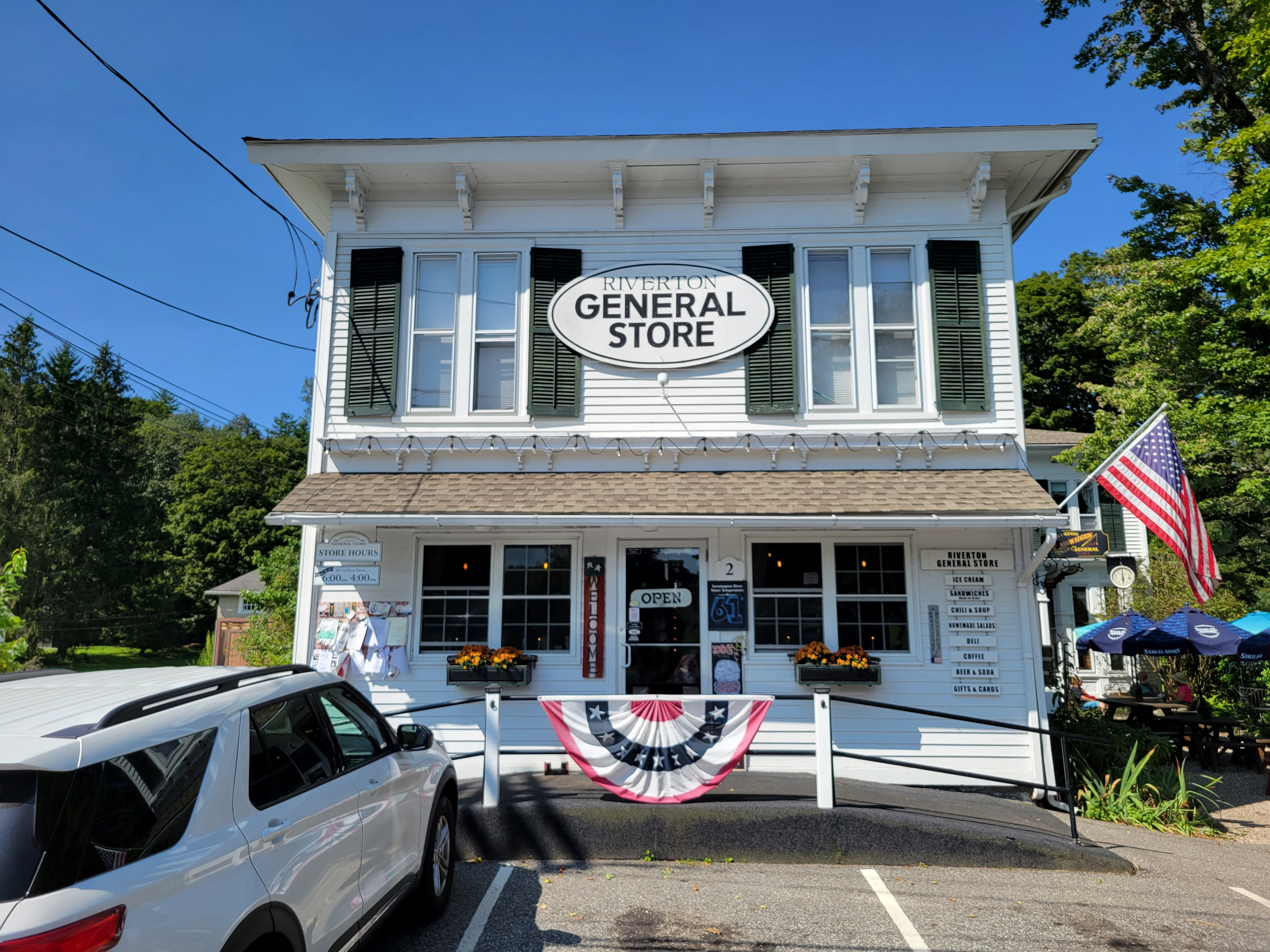
- Riverton General Store

- Location within Connecticut Location within the United States
- Coordinates: 41°57′46″N 73°1′0″W
- Country: United States
- State: Connecticut
- County: Litchfield
- Town: Barkhamsted

Area
  - Total: 0.48 sq mi (1.25 km^{2})
  - Land: 0.48 sq mi (1.25 km^{2})
  - Water: 0 sq mi (0.0 km^{2})
- Elevation: 512 ft (156 m)
- Time zone: UTC-5 (Eastern (EST))
  - Summer (DST): UTC-4 (EDT)
- ZIP Code: 06065
- Area codes: 860/959
- FIPS code: 09-64880
- GNIS feature ID: 2805984

Riverton is an unincorporated village and census-designated place (CDP) in the town of Barkhamsted, Connecticut, United States. It is in the northwestern corner of the town, bordered to the north by the town of Hartland in Hartford County. The village sits at the confluence of the Still River with the West Branch of the Farmington River.

As of the 2020 census, Riverton had a population of 160.

Riverton was first listed as a CDP prior to the 2020 census. A total of 94 acres (0.38 km^{2}) of the village center comprise the Riverton Historic District.

== Education ==
It is in the Barkhamsted School District.
