= Farmington River =

River in the United States of America

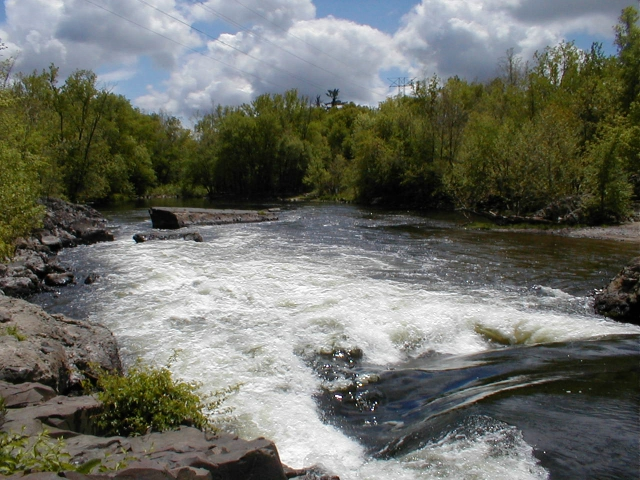
- Looking downstream on the Farmington River in Simsbury, Connecticut

Location
- Country: United States
- State: Massachusetts and Connecticut

Physical characteristics
- Source: Outlet of Hayden Pond (West Branch of the Farmington River)
  - location: Otis, Berkshire County, Massachusetts
- 2nd source: Barkhamsted Reservoir (East Branch of the Farmington River)
  - location: Hartland, Hartford County, Connecticut
- Source confluence: confluence of the East Branch and West Branch
  - location: New Hartford, Litchfield County, Connecticut
- Mouth: confluence with Connecticut River
  - location: Windsor, Hartford County, Connecticut
  - coordinates: 41°50′37.3596″N 72°37′52.6368″W
- Length: 80.4 mi (129.4 km), from source of West Branch
- Basin size: 602 mi^{2} (1,560 km^{2})

National Wild and Scenic River
- Official name: Farmington River
- Type: Recreational
- Designated: August 26, 1994

The Farmington River is a 46.7 mi (75.2 km) river located in northwest Connecticut, with major tributaries extending into southwest Massachusetts. The Farmington River's watershed covers 609 square miles (1,580 km^{2}). Historically, the river played an important role in small-scale manufacturing in towns along its course, but it is now mainly used for recreation and drinking water.

== Geography ==
The headwaters of the Farmington River consist of the East and West Branches.

The West Branch begins at the outlet of Hayden Pond in Otis, Massachusetts, while the East Branch begins in Hartland, Connecticut, at the confluence of Pond, Hubbard and Valley Brooks. The longest route of the river, from the origin of its West Branch, is 80.4 miles (129.4 km) long, making the Farmington River the Connecticut River's longest tributary by 2.3 miles (3.7 km) over the Westfield River directly to its north.

The East Branch has been impounded along the first 11 miles of its course by the Saville Dam to create the Barkhamsted Reservoir and Lake McDonough, exiting the latter in New Hartford, Connecticut, and joining the West Branch one mile south of the lake. Upper reaches of the river generally flow southward, but the river turns northward in Farmington, Connecticut, and runs mostly north and east until it flows into the Connecticut River in Windsor, Connecticut.

== History ==
Sites built adjacent to the river by nomadic peoples at the end of the last Ice Age, c.12,400 years BP of the Younger Dryas indicate the presence of the earliest peoples to populate the region that would become known as southern New England. In the winter of 2019, the remains of the site were excavated in Avon, along with stone tools and artifacts constructed from materials in neighboring regions.

The upper Connecticut and Farmington River valleys were the lands of the Native American indigenous people called the Massaco, a sub-tribe of the Tunxis, who were affiliated with the Wappinger. The name Tunxis, a word in the Quiripi family of Eastern Algonquian languages, derives from the indigenous term Wuttunkshau for "the point where the river bends". Halfway through the course of the river, in a floodplain in the town of Farmington at the base of the Metacomet Ridge, the flow of the Farmington River changes its direction to the northeast, where it eventually joins up with the Connecticut River in Windsor.

When Europeans first arrived, the "Tunxis Sepus" territory consisted of a 165-mile square area bounded by Simsbury to the North, Wallingford to the South, to the northwest by Mohawk country, and on the east by the current towns of Windsor, Hartford and Wethersfield. In 1645, the Town of Farmington, Connecticut was named by the Connecticut General Assembly, and this was re-affirmed in 1650 by the execution of a deed by the General Assembly and the reservation of land for the "Tunxis Indians" near "Indian Neck" on the east bank of the Farmington River. A group of twenty wigwams existed in Farmington at the beginning of the eighteenth century, but only four or five families resided in the settlement by 1761

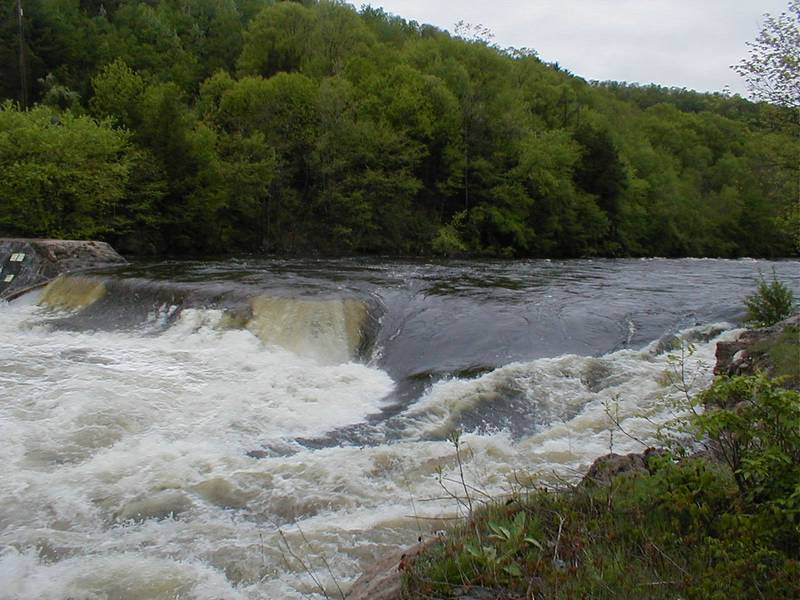
The Farmington River was one of the Massaco people's chief fishing grounds

The land of the Massaco was subsequently purchased by the Dutch. This and its settlement during the era of the Connecticut Colony are described in the early history of Simsbury.

The Spoonville Dam, built on the Farmington River in 1899 below the Tariffville Gorge in East Granby, was breached in the Flood of 1955 and remained as a partial dam for several decades before being removed in July 2012. The dam, as well as the bridge crossing the Farmington River downstream at Route 187, derived its name from the silver plating factory erected in 1840 on the north bank of the river. It was the first factory of its kind in the United States.

=== Historical crossings ===
Several bridges constructed in the 19th century and early 20th century still span the Farmington River to this day. Among these are:

- Farmington River Railroad Bridge, a stone arch bridge in Windsor, Connecticut built in 1867
- Drake Hill Road Bridge, a Parker through-truss bridge in Simsbury, Connecticut constructed in 1892
- Town Bridge, a Parker through-truss bridge in Canton, Connecticut constructed by the Berlin Iron Bridge Company in 1895
- Richards Corner Bridge, a Pratt through-truss bridge in New Hartford, Connecticut built in 1930 which spans the East Branch Farmington River
- Pleasant Valley Bridge, a Parker through-truss bridge in Barkhamsted, Connecticut built in 1939
- Unionville Bridge, a Warren through-truss bridge in Unionville, Connecticut built in 1939

== Recreation ==
=== Fishing ===
The Farmington River is among Connecticut's most heavily stocked trout streams, with over 50,000 brook, brown, rainbow and tiger trout planted in 2022 throughout the West Branch and main stem. It also hosts a robust population of wild, stream-born trout, which have been found to account for roughly 40% of the river's trout population. The West Branch, in particular, has developed a reputation as one of the best trout streams in the Northeastern United States, owing largely to being a bottom-release tailwater which remains cold, well-oxygenated and especially conducive to sustaining coldwater fish species year-round. The unique "Survivor Strain" brown trout, selectively bred at state hatcheries to be supremely adapted to Connecticut's waters, relies on annual collections of high-quality wild and holdover trout from the West Branch.

=== Boating ===
The river has several whitewater sections that are popular for tubing and kayaking. One of these, the colloquial "Upper Farmington" section of the West Branch in New Boston, Massachusetts, is about 7 miles (11 km) long. It is Class 2 through farm and woods scenery to an iron bridge, where kayak and canoe slalom races are held. A second whitewater section is found in Tariffville, Connecticut, consisting of 1.5 miles (2.4 km) of technical Class 2 and Class 3 water with heavy currents. Other whitewater areas include Satan's Kingdom in New Hartford, Connecticut, which is also popular with tubers, and the Crystal Rapids section in Collinsville and Unionville, Connecticut, which offers 4 miles (6.4 km) of Class 2 waters.

== Dams and power generation ==
The west branch of the river includes hydroelectric dams in West Hartland and Colebrook, run by the Metropolitan District Commission of Connecticut.

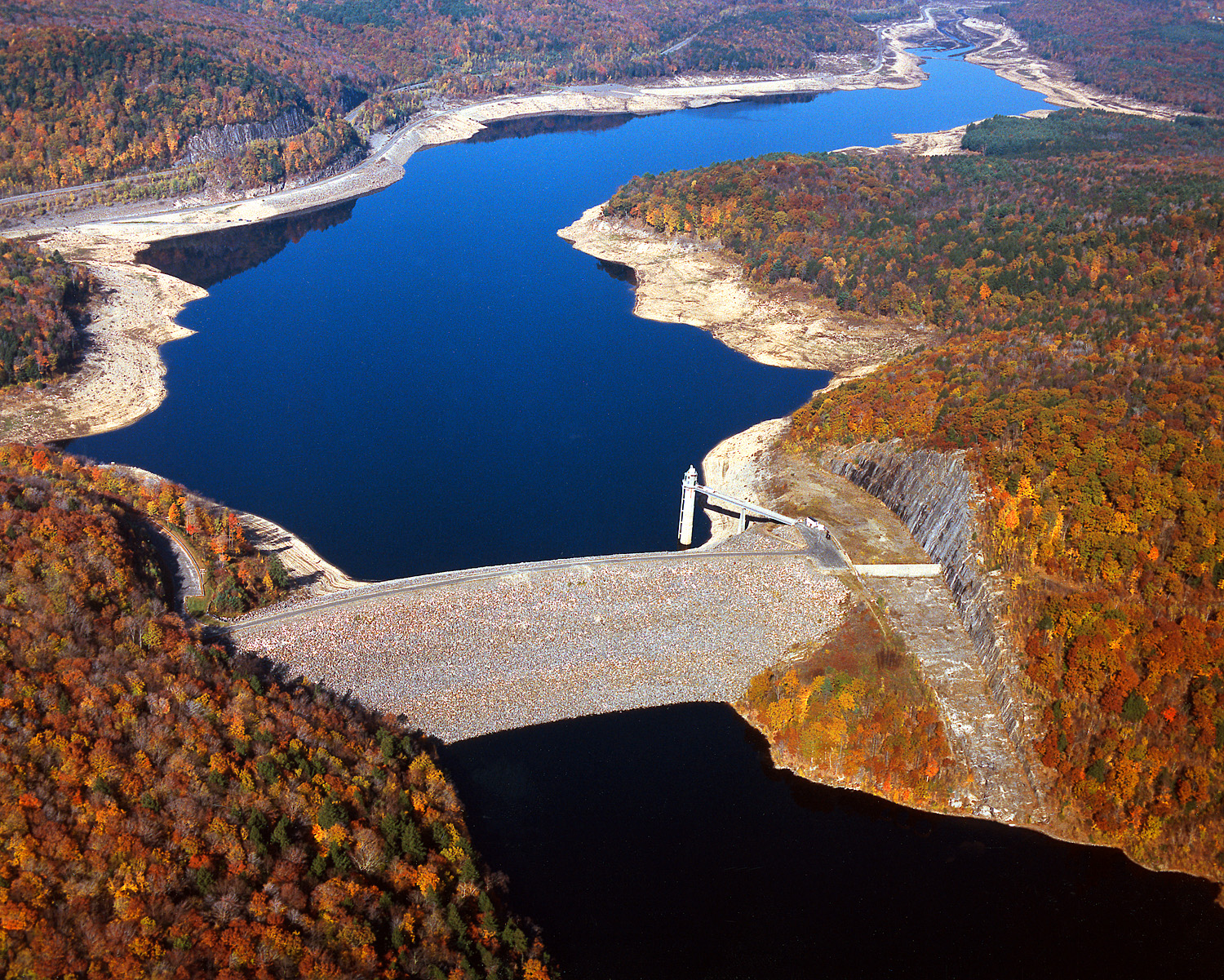
Colebrook River Lake on the West Branch Farmington River

The largest dam on the east branch is the Saville Dam, which impounds the Barkhamsted Reservoir.

The Rainbow Dam, a 68-foot (21 m) dam with a hydroelectric generator and a fish ladder, dams the river at Windsor, a few miles before the river flows into the Connecticut River.

A number of other dams have been built on the river since European settlement, usually to power mills and other industry. A few, such as in Collinsville, are still mostly intact. The Collinsville Renewable Energy Promotion Act (H.R. 316;113th Congress) would instruct the Federal Energy Regulatory Commission to issue licenses to the town of Canton, Connecticut, to restart two small power dams along the river. The bill passed the United States House of Representatives on February 12, 2013, but has not yet become law.

Water released from or flowing over the Otis Reservoir dam enters the Farmington River just north of Reservoir Road in Otis, Massachusetts. Significant quantities of water are released during the fall in order to drop the reservoir water level for the winter.

== Natural resources and conservation ==
Much of the Farmington River has been designated as part of the United States National Wild & Scenic Rivers System. The first such designation on the river was bestowed in 1994 and included 14 miles of water, mostly along the Farmington River West Branch but also a section of the river's main stem, from Hartland to the New Hartford-Canton town line. In 2019, this designation was extended 1.1 miles further downstream to the confluence with the Nepaug River. Most of the Farmington River main stem and the Salmon Brook tributary system, totalling 61.7 miles of additional water, were also designated Wild & Scenic in 2019. The Farmington River Coordinating Committee oversees the implementation of management plans for the designated runs of the Farmington River and includes representatives from towns along the river, the Connecticut Department of Energy and Environmental Protection, Metropolitan District Commission, National Park Service, Farmington River Watershed Association and Farmington River Anglers Association.

The Farmington River and its tributaries are known to contain 11 species of freshwater mussels. The Farmington has the highest mussel species diversity of any tributary to the Connecticut, lacking only the Yellow lampmussel, which is found only in the mainstem of the Connecticut from Turners Falls, MA downriver to Windsor, CT.

== Photographs of notable places ==
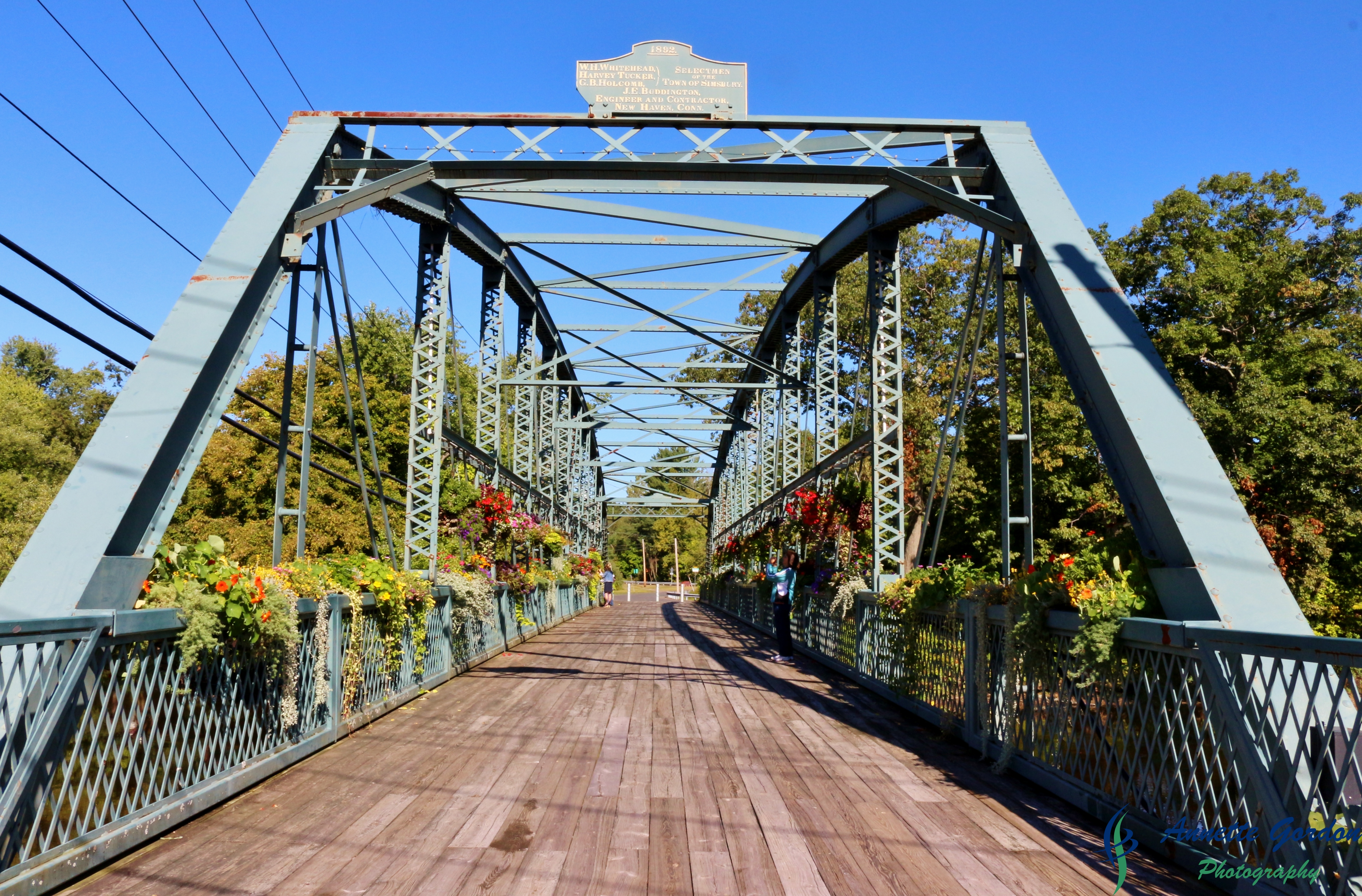
Drake Hill Road Bridge, built in 1892 to span the Farmington River in Simsbury, Connecticut

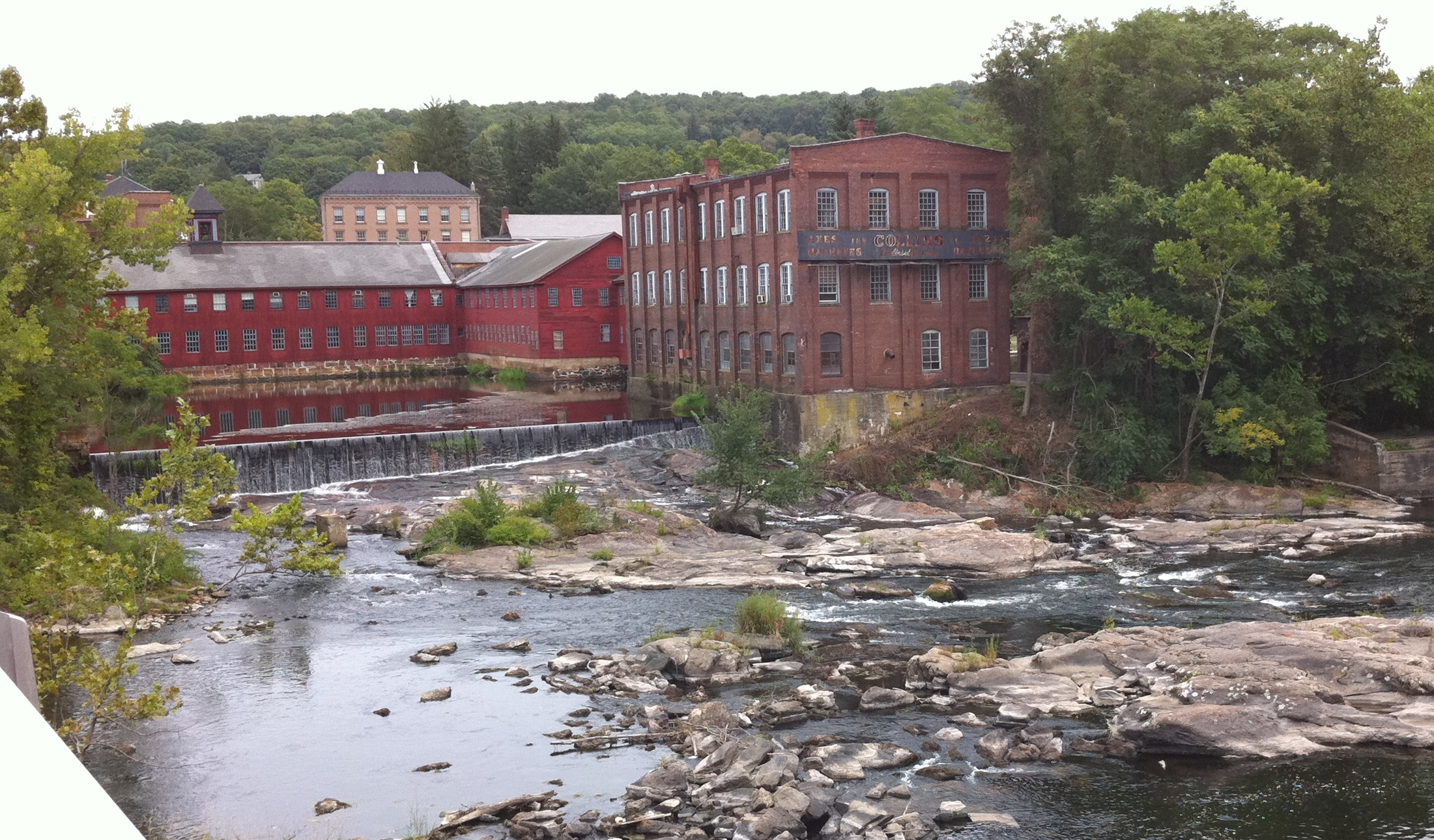
Historic mills along the Farmington River in the Collinsville section of Canton, Connecticut.

A stone arch bridge built in 1867 which still spans the Farmington River in Windsor, Connecticut.

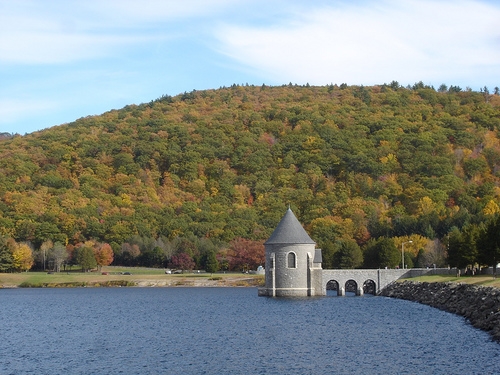
The Saville Dam impounds the East Branch Farmington River to form Barkhamsted Reservoir.

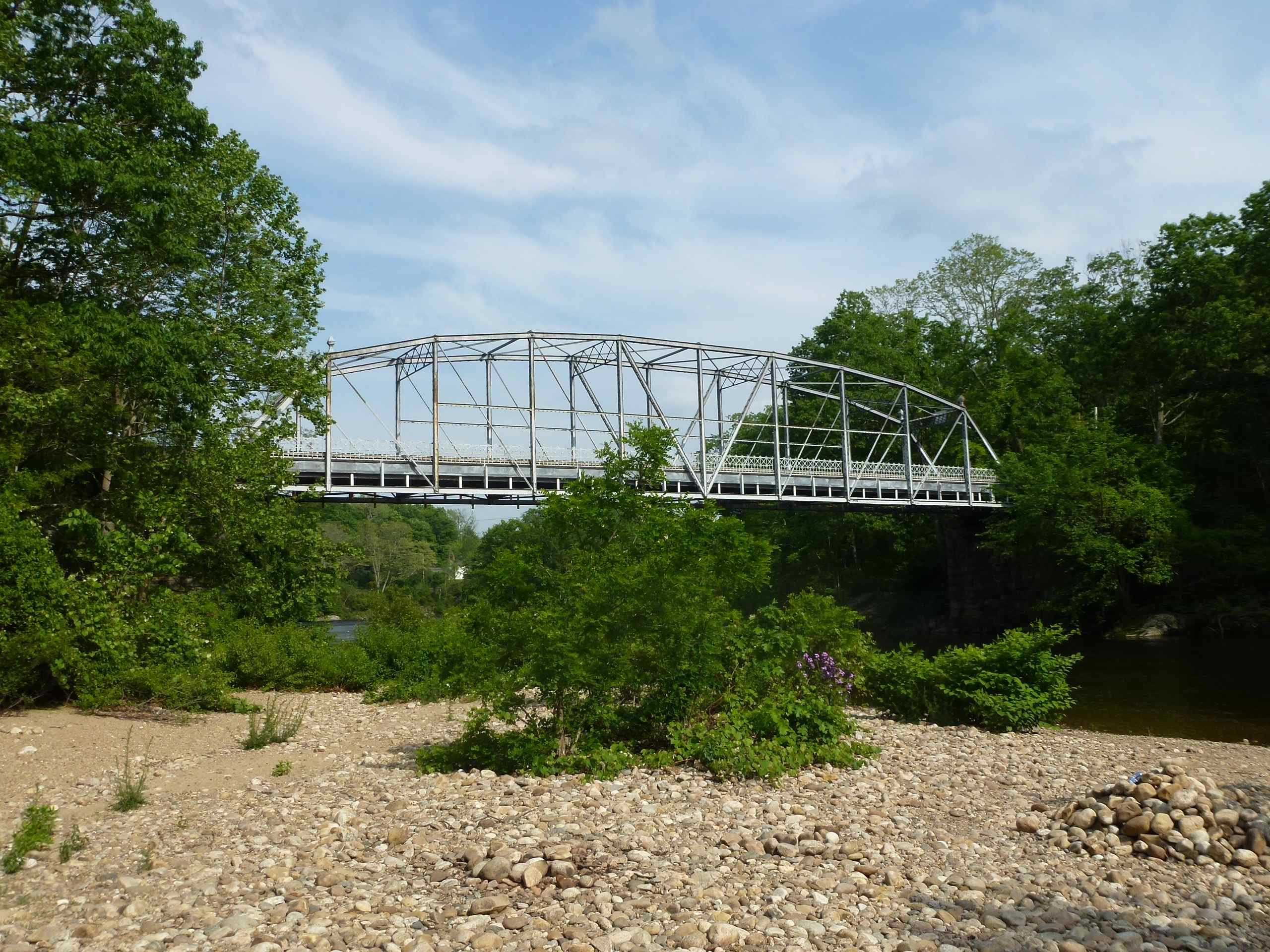
Town Bridge, built in 1895 over the Farmington River in Canton, Connecticut.

== See also ==
- List of rivers of Connecticut
