= Blue Hills, Connecticut =

Census-designated place in Connecticut, United States

- Census-designated place and city neighborhood
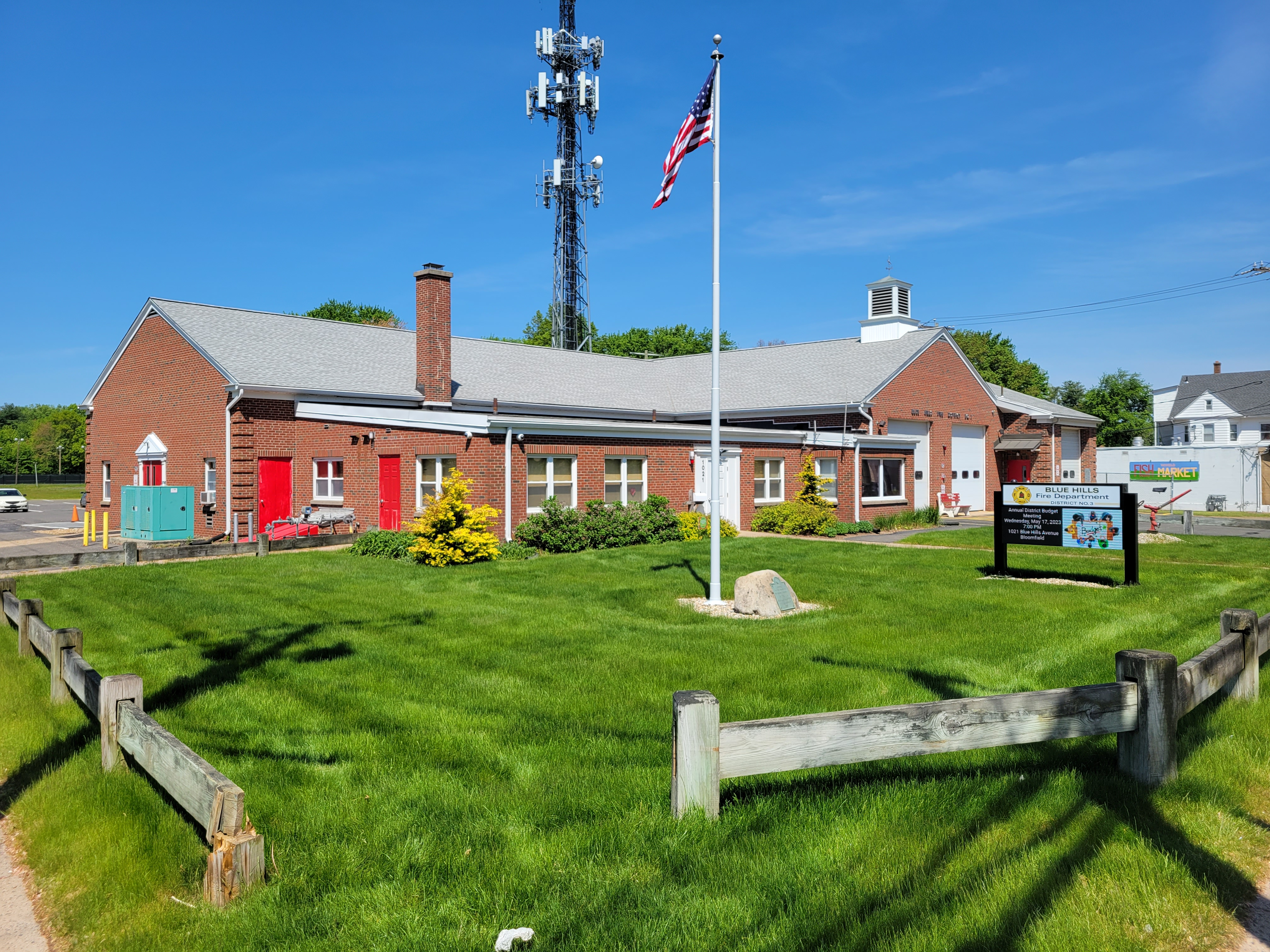
- Blue Hills Fire Department

- Location within Connecticut Location within the United States
- Coordinates: 41°48′46″N 72°41′51″W
- Country: United States
- State: Connecticut
- County: Hartford
- Municipalities: Hartford (neighborhood); Bloomfield (CDP)

Area
  - Total: 1.17 sq mi (3.02 km^{2})
  - Land: 1.17 sq mi (3.02 km^{2})
  - Water: 0 sq mi (0.0 km^{2})
- Elevation: 140 ft (43 m)

Population (2020)
  - Total: 2,762
  - Density: 2,490/sq mi (961.4/km^{2})
- Time zone: UTC-5 (Eastern)
  - Summer (DST): UTC-4 (Eastern)
- ZIP code: 06112
- Area Code: 860
- FIPS code: 09-06050
- GNIS feature ID: 2378337
- All figures are for the CDP portion of Blue Hills.

Blue Hills is a community in Hartford County, Connecticut, United States, encompassing the northwestern corner of the city of Hartford and the southeastern corner of the town of Bloomfield. The Bloomfield portion is listed by the U.S. Census Bureau as a census-designated place (CDP), with a population of 2,762 at the 2020 census.

Blue Hills is home to many schools and homes. Including the portion in Hartford, it has roughly 10,000 residents, and has several schools and one university located there. Its main thoroughfares are Granby Street, Blue Hills Avenue (Route 187), Plainfield Street, Bloomfield Avenue (Route 189) and Albany Avenue (US 44). Connecticut Transit operates several bus routes through the neighborhood, such as the 50, 52 and 54, which run on Blue Hills Avenue, the 56 and 58, which run up on Albany Avenue and Bloomfield Avenue, the 74, which runs through Westbrook Village on its way to Copaco Shopping Center via Granby Street, and the 76, which runs on Cornwall Street towards Bowles Park.

Blue Hills has a majority of West Indian and African American residents. Educational institutions include Annie Fisher ES, Mountain Laurel School (Annie Fisher School Annex), Sarah J. Rawson ES, Mark Twain ES, Martin Luther King Jr. ES, Weaver HS, Watkinson School, and the University of Hartford.

== Geography ==
According to the United States Census Bureau, the CDP portion of Blue Hills has a total area of 1.2 square miles (3.0 km^{2}), all land.

== Demographics ==
Historical population
Census	Pop.	Note	%±
2000	3,020		—
2010	2,901		−3.9%
2020	2,762		−4.8%
U.S. Decennial Census; 2010 2020

=== Racial and ethnic composition ===
Blue Hills CDP, Connecticut – Racial and ethnic composition Note: the US Census treats Hispanic/Latino as an ethnic category. This table excludes Latinos from the racial categories and assigns them to a separate category. Hispanics/Latinos may be of any race.
Race / Ethnicity (NH = Non-Hispanic)	Pop 2010	Pop 2020	% 2010	% 2020
White alone (NH)	130	96	4.48%	3.48%
Black or African American alone (NH)	2,510	2,300	86.52%	83.27%
Native American or Alaska Native alone (NH)	2	7	0.07%	0.25%
Asian alone (NH)	6	17	0.21%	0.62%
Pacific Islander alone (NH)	1	0	0.03%	0.00%
Some Other Race alone (NH)	3	17	0.10%	0.62%
Mixed Race or Multi-Racial (NH)	89	92	3.07%	3.33%
Hispanic or Latino (any race)	160	233	5.52%	8.44%
Total	2,901	2,762	100.00%	100.00%

=== 2020 census ===
As of the 2020 census, Blue Hills had a population of 2,762. The median age was 45.6 years. 19.5% of residents were under the age of 18 and 20.9% of residents were 65 years of age or older. For every 100 females, there were 84.9 males, and for every 100 females age 18 and over, there were 77.4 males age 18 and over.

100.0% of residents lived in urban areas, while 0.0% lived in rural areas.

There were 1,014 households in Blue Hills, of which 29.8% had children under the age of 18 living in them. Of all households, 31.5% were married-couple households, 12.3% were households with a male householder and no spouse or partner present, and 51.4% were households with a female householder and no spouse or partner present. About 25.5% of all households were made up of individuals and 12.6% had someone living alone who was 65 years of age or older.

There were 1,077 housing units, of which 5.8% were vacant. The homeowner vacancy rate was 3.7% and the rental vacancy rate was 6.5%.

=== 2000 census ===
As of the census of 2000, there were 3,020 people, 1,008 households, and 782 families residing in the CDP. The population density was 2,643.7 inhabitants per square mile (1,020.7/km^{2}). There were 1,044 housing units at an average density of 913.9 per square mile (352.9/km^{2}). The racial makeup of the CDP was 9.80% White, 83.11% black, 0.40% Native American, 1.23% Asian, 0.03% Pacific Islander, 1.49% from other races, and 3.94% from two or more races. Hispanic or Latino of any race were 4.07% of the population.

In 2000, 23.9% of Blue Hills residents identified as being of Jamaican heritage. This was the highest percentage of Jamaican Americans of any place in the country.

There were 1,008 households, out of which 30.2% had children under the age of 18 living with them, 43.9% were married couples living together, 28.4% had a female householder with no husband present, and 22.4% were non-families. 19.5% of all households were made up of individuals, and 8.7% had someone living alone who was 65 years of age or older. The average household size was 2.89 and the average family size was 3.29.

In the CDP, the population was spread out, with 25.7% under the age of 18, 7.8% from 18 to 24, 25.8% from 25 to 44, 25.6% from 45 to 64, and 15.1% who were 65 years of age or older. The median age was 38 years. For every 100 females, there were 82.9 males. For every 100 females age 18 and over, there were 79.1 males.

The median income for a household in the CDP was $48,859, and the median income for a family was $52,361. Males had a median income of $36,842 versus $30,972 for females. The per capita income for the CDP was $21,618. About 3.9% of families and 8.7% of the population were below the poverty line, including 14.6% of those under age 18 and 13.1% of those age 65 or over.

== Transportation ==
The main north–south roads are Granby Street and Blue Hills Avenue (Route 187). The main east–west road is Cottage Grove Road (Route 218). The 46, 50, 52, 54, 56, 74, 76, and 92 bus routes from Connecticut Transit serve the area. There have been plans for the local railroad, the Griffin Line (which is used by freight), to be made into commuter rail. Interstate highways 91 and 291 link Blue Hills to New Haven, Hartford, Springfield, Massachusetts, and points east of the Connecticut River.

== Education ==
Blue Hills is home to Annie Fisher School, Mark Twain School, Weaver High School, Watkinson School, and the University of Hartford

== Religion ==
Blue Hills is home to The First Cathedral, New England's largest Protestant church.
