= Filley =

Filley may refer to one of the following:

== People ==
- Chauncey Filley, American politician
- Glen Filley, American football and basketball coach
- Mark Filley, American baseball player
- Oliver Filley, American politician
- Pat Filley, American football player and coach
- William Filley, English founder of Windsor, Connecticut

== Places ==
- Filley, Missouri
- Filley, Nebraska
- Filley Township, Gage County, Nebraska
