= Connecticut Route 185 =

State highway in Hartford County, Connecticut, US

Route 185
- Map of Hartford County in northern Connecticut with Route 185 highlighted in red

Route information
- Maintained by CTDOT
- Length: 6.36 mi (10.24 km)
- Existed: 1932–present

Major junctions
- West end: US 202 / Route 10 in Simsbury
- East end: Route 189 in West Hartford

Location
- Country: United States
- State: Connecticut
- Counties: Hartford

Highway system
- Connecticut State Highway System; Interstate; US; State; SSR; SR; Scenic
← Route 184	→ Route 186

Route 185 is a Connecticut state highway in the western Hartford suburbs, running from Simsbury to West Hartford.

== Route description ==
Route 185 begins as Hartford Road at an intersection with US 202 and Route 10 in the Weatogue section of Simsbury. The road heads east across the Farmington River and turns southeast, passing by Talcott Mountain State Park then heading into the town of Bloomfield, where it becomes Simsbury Road. In Bloomfield, it passes the western end of Route 178 and continues generally southeast across the southwestern part of town into West Hartford. At the Bloomfield-West Hartford Townline, the road becomes four lanes wide as it intersects with Route 218. The road runs for another 1.7 miles (2.7 km) in West Hartford as it continues southeast to end at an intersection with Route 189 near the University of Hartford.

== History ==
In the 1920s, the Weatogue-Hartford route was a primary state highway known as Highway 115. It ran along modern Route 185 to Route 218 then used modern Route 218 to connect to modern US 44. Route 185 was established in 1932, running north–south from US 44 in West Hartford to the current western terminus. In 1935, Route 218 was established and took over the portion of modern Route 185 (former SR 920) east of modern Route 218. In 1963, the ends of Routes 185 and 218 were swapped resulting in the present configuration: the section south of the 185/218 junction was transferred to Route 218, and the section east of the junction was transferred to Route 185.

== Junction list ==
The entire route is in Hartford County.

Location	mi	km	Destinations	Notes
Simsbury	0.00	0.00	US 202 / Route 10 – Avon, Granby	Western terminus
Bloomfield	2.75	4.43	Route 178 east – Windsor	Western terminus of Route 178
Bloomfield	4.70	7.56	Route 218 – Bloomfield, Windsor, West Hartford	
West Hartford	6.36	10.24	Route 189 – Hartford, Bloomfield	Eastern terminus
1.000 mi = 1.609 km; 1.000 km = 0.621 mi
