= Route 187 (Connecticut–Massachusetts) =

Highway in Connecticut and Massachusetts

Route 187
- Map of northern Connecticut and southern Massachusetts with CT 187 in solid red and MA 187 in dotted red

Route information
- Maintained by ConnDOT and MassDOT
- Length: 27.23 mi (43.82 km) 19.74 miles (31.77 km) in CT; 7.49 miles (12.05 km) in MA
- Existed: 1932 (CT 189); 1939 (MA 189)–present

Major junctions
- South end: US 44 in Hartford, CT
- Route 189 in Bloomfield, CT; Route 57 in Agawam, MA
- North end: US 20 in Westfield, MA

Location
- Country: United States
- States: Connecticut, Massachusetts
- Counties: CT: Hartford, MA: Hampden

Highway system
- Connecticut State Highway System; Interstate; US; State; SSR; SR; Scenic
← Route 186	→ Route 188
← Route 186	MA	→ Route 189

Route 187 is a 27.23-mile-long (43.82 km) secondary state route in the U.S. states of Connecticut and Massachusetts. It begins in the city of Hartford at Albany Avenue (US 44), travels north through the towns of Bloomfield, Windsor, East Granby and Suffield until the Connecticut-Massachusetts state line. Route 187 continues north across the state line through Agawam into Westfield, where the route ends at US 20 east of Westfield center. Route 187 crosses the Farmington River between the towns of Bloomfield and East Granby.

== Route description ==
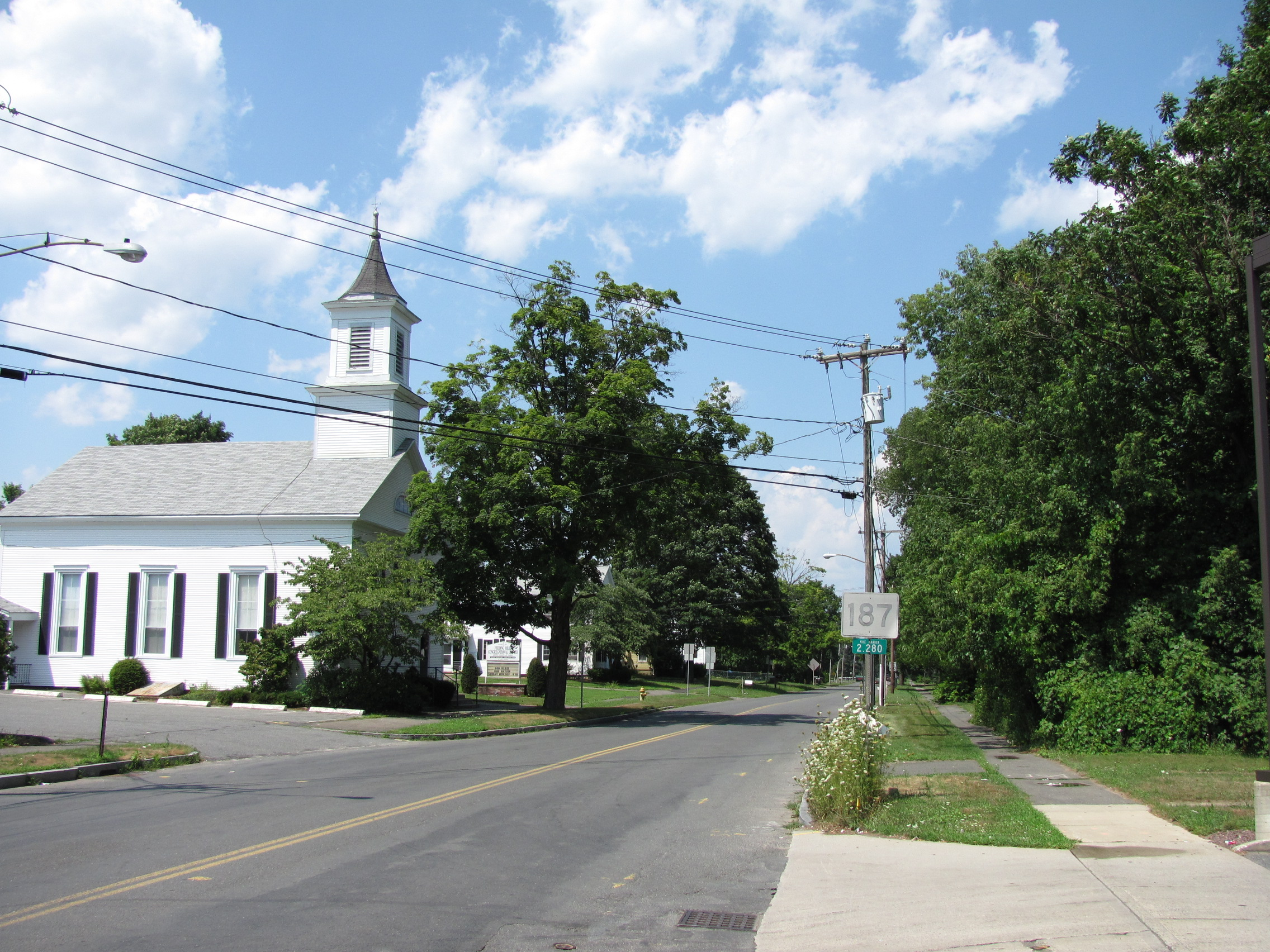
Northbound in Feeding Hills, Massachusetts

Route 187 begins at an intersection with US 44 in Hartford and heads north, crossing into Bloomfield. In Bloomfield, it continues north and northwest through the eastern part of town, crossing Routes 218, 178, and the western end of Route 305 before briefly clipping the northwest corner of Windsor. It the reenters Bloomfield, where it briefly overlaps with Route 189 to form a four-lane freeway. Route 187 veers off to the north, and crosses the Farmington River into East Granby. In East Granby, it continues north-northeast across the town as a two-lane expressway before becoming a two-lane surface road. It crosses Route 20 in the town center before crossing into Suffield. In Suffield, it continues north-northeast through the village of West Suffield, where it intersects Route 168 before crossing the Massachusetts state line.

Route 187 enters Massachusetts in Agawam as Pine Street. In Agawam, Route 187 has a junction with the west end of the Route 57 expressway. Route 57 joins Route 187 for about 0.8 miles (1.3 km) before continuing west towards Southwick. This junction also marks the western end of Route 147, which carries local traffic toward West Springfield. Route 187 continues north through the village of Feeding Hills along North Westfield Street. The route veers west as it approaches the Westfield River and begins to follow along the path of the river. The Westfield River and Route 187 bend south then north until it intersects US 20 soon after crossing into the city of Westfield. In Massachusetts, Route 187 is maintained by the municipal governments of Agawam and Westfield.

== History ==
In the 1920s, modern Route 187 between North Bloomfield (at Route 189) and West Suffield (at Route 168) was part of old State Highway 328. The old route continued east to Suffield Center along modern Route 168. The southern end of modern Route 187 was also part of an alternate route of then New England Route 10 (now Route 189) to Bloomfield center known as State Highway 311. The old route served the Blue Hills community and used Park Avenue (modern Route 178) from Blue Hills Avenue to Bloomfield center.

Connecticut's Route 187 was established in the 1932 state highway renumbering from old Highway 328. The original route began at current Route 189 (then Route 9) in North Bloomfield and continued north to the Massachusetts state line, where the designation was continued by Massachusetts along roughly its modern alignment to US 20 in 1939. In 1955, part of Route 9 was washed away in a flood, and when the roadway was reopened in 1961, Route 187 was shifted slightly to its current route (the original route went along Spoonville Road) and Route 9 was relocated to the current Route 189 south of the Farmington River (the original Route 9 went along the north bank of the river on Tunxis Avenue). The North Bloomfield freeway section of Routes 187 and 189 were opened at this time. In 1963, Route 187 was extended south to its current southern terminus along a section of old Route 184 (established in 1932 from old Highway 311) and SR 921 (northward continuation of Blue Hills Avenue). In the late 1980s, the southern intersection of Routes 187 and 189 was modified slightly with the construction of a new interchange, resulting in a slight re-routing.

== Major intersections ==
State	County	Location	mi	km	Destinations	Notes
Connecticut	Hartford	Hartford	0.00	0.00	US 44 – Downtown Hartford, West Hartford	Southern terminus
Connecticut	Hartford	Bloomfield	2.35	3.78	Route 218 – West Hartford, Windsor	
Connecticut	Hartford	Bloomfield	3.67	5.91	Route 178 – Windsor, Bloomfield	
Connecticut	Hartford	Bloomfield	5.15	8.29	Route 305 east – Windsor	Western terminus of Route 305
Connecticut	Hartford	Bloomfield	7.87	12.67	Route 189 south – Bloomfield	Southern end of Route 189 concurrency
Connecticut	Hartford	Bloomfield	7.87	12.67	Southern end of limited-access section	
Connecticut	Hartford	Bloomfield	8.36	13.45	Tariffville Road	
Connecticut	Hartford	Bloomfield	8.47	13.63	Route 189 north – Tariffville, Granby	Northern end of Route 189 concurrency
Connecticut	Hartford	East Granby	10.54	16.96	Northern end of limited-access section	
Connecticut	Hartford	East Granby	10.54	16.96	Hatchet Hill Road (SR 540 west)	
Connecticut	Hartford	East Granby	12.49	20.10	Route 20 – Granby, Windsor Locks	
Connecticut	Hartford	West Suffield	16.52	26.59	Route 168 – Suffield, Southwick, MA	
Connecticut–Massachusetts state line			19.74 0.00	31.77 0.00	Route transition	
Massachusetts	Hampden	Agawam	2.29	3.69	Route 57 east – Springfield	Southern end of Route 57 concurrency
Massachusetts	Hampden	Agawam	3.09	4.97	Route 57 west to Route 147 east – Southwick, West Springfield	Northern end of Route 57 concurrency
Massachusetts	Hampden	Westfield	7.49	12.05	US 20 – Westfield, West Springfield	Northern terminus
1.000 mi = 1.609 km; 1.000 km = 0.621 mi: Concurrency terminus
