= Bissell Bridge (Connecticut) =

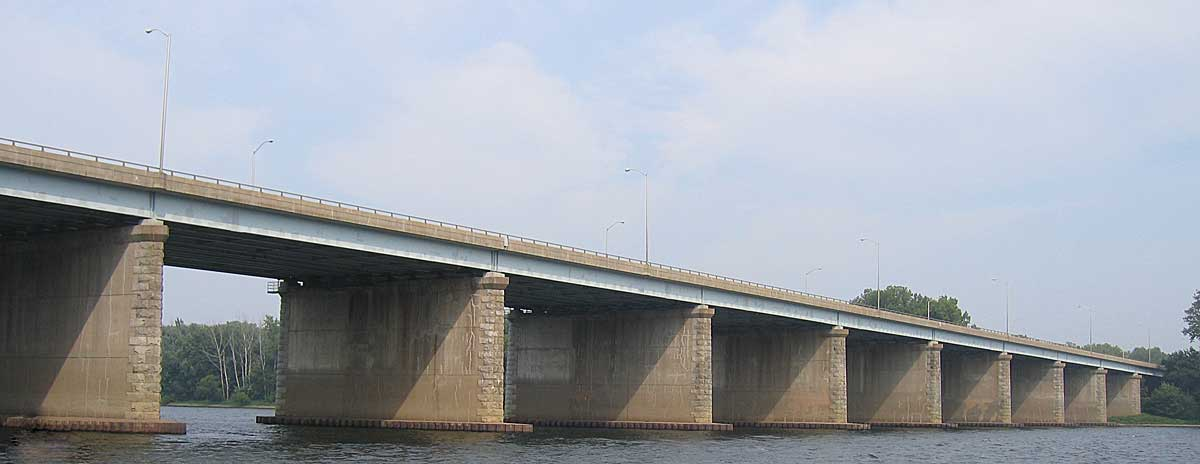
- The bridge crossing the river
- Coordinates: 41°48′47″N 72°38′40″W
- Carries: I-291, Bike Path
- Crosses: Connecticut River
- Locale: Windsor, Connecticut and South Windsor, Connecticut
- Official name: Captain John Bissell Memorial Bridge
- Maintained by: Greater Hartford Bridge Authority (until 1989); Connecticut Department of Transportation (after 1989)

Characteristics
- Total length: 1,690 feet (520 m)
- No. of spans: 14

History
- Opened: December 16, 1957

Location
- Interactive map of Bissell Bridge

The Captain John Bissell Memorial Bridge carries I-291 over the Connecticut River, connecting the towns of Windsor, Connecticut and South Windsor, Connecticut. There is a pedestrian crossing on the bridge on the westbound, upstream side.

== History and construction of the Bridge ==
The Bulkeley Bridge was the only bridge crossing on the Connecticut River for miles in the early 20th century. Then it was proposed in the 1930s to build two more road bridges on the river for the Wilbur Cross Highway. In 1955 the new Charter Oak Bridge, built 10 years earlier, was not helping to ease traffic on the Bulkeley Bridge. The Greater Hartford Bridge Authority was created to build this bridge and the Putnam Bridge in Glastonbury. An Interstate bypass was also planned to be built in the Hartford Area, eventually becoming I-291. The bridge and bypass opened on December 16, 1957, from I-91 to US 5. The bridge was originally called Wolcott Bridge, because of the name of the road formerly carried on it. It was renamed in 1960 to its current name. A toll was charged on the bridge until a tollbooth accident in 1983, which was one of the toll accidents that resulted in statewide removal of tollbooths in the 1980s.

== See also ==
- List of crossings of the Connecticut River
