= Connecticut Route 178 =

State highway in Hartford County, Connecticut, US

Route 178
- Map of Hartford County in northern Connecticut with Route 178 highlighted in red

Route information
- Maintained by CTDOT
- Length: 6.89 mi (11.09 km)
- Existed: 1932–present

Major junctions
- West end: Route 185 in Bloomfield
- I-91 in Windsor
- East end: Route 159 in Windsor

Location
- Country: United States
- State: Connecticut
- Counties: Hartford

Highway system
- Connecticut State Highway System; Interstate; US; State; SSR; SR; Scenic
← Route 177	→ Route 179

Route 178 is a Connecticut state highway in the northern suburbs of Hartford, running from Bloomfield to Windsor.

== Route description ==
Route 178 begins as Loeffler Road at an intersection with Route 185 in the western part of the town of Bloomfield. The road heads generally east towards Bloomfield center, shifting to Mountain Avenue after 0.7 miles (1.1 km), then intersecting with Route 189 in the town center a mile later. East of Route 189, Route 178 uses Park Avenue as it continues through the southeast part of the town. The route shifts to Wintonbury Avenue about 1.7 miles (2.7 km) later using a short segment of School Street. After intersecting with Route 187, it soon enters the town of Windsor, becoming Park Avenue. The route continues east, intersecting I-91 at Exit 36 before ending at an intersection with Route 159 south of Windsor center.

== History ==
Route 178 was commissioned in 1932, running from the intersection of School Street and Park Avenue in Bloomfield to its current eastern terminus. In 1963, the east–west portion of former Route 184, which is mostly modern Route 178 west of School Street, was absorbed by Route 178. The west end of former Route 184 used West Street and Mountain Avenue instead of Loeffler Road. This was reconfigured to the current Loeffler Road alignment in 1965, with the former alignment becoming town roads.

== Junction list ==
The entire route is in Hartford County.

Location	mi	km	Destinations	Notes
Bloomfield	0.00	0.00	Route 185 – Hartford, Simsbury	Western terminus
Bloomfield	1.69	2.72	Route 189 – Hartford, Granby	
Bloomfield	4.39	7.07	Route 187 – Hartford, East Granby	
Windsor	6.2	10.0	I-91 – Hartford, Springfield	Exit 36 on I-91
Windsor	6.89	11.09	Route 159 – Hartford, Windsor Center	Eastern terminus
1.000 mi = 1.609 km; 1.000 km = 0.621 mi
