= Route 186 (Connecticut–Massachusetts) =

Highway in Connecticut and Massachusetts

Route 186
- Map of northern Connecticut and southern Massachusetts with CT 186 in solid red and MA 186 in dotted red

Route information
- Maintained by ConnDOT and Town of East Longmeadow
- Length: 6.00 mi (9.66 km) 3.57 miles (5.75 km) in CT; 2.43 miles (3.91 km) in MA
- Existed: 1932 (CT 186); 1939 (MA 186)–present

Major junctions
- South end: Route 190 in Somers, CT
- North end: Route 83 / Route 220 in East Longmeadow, MA

Location
- Country: United States
- States: Connecticut, Massachusetts
- Counties: CT: Tolland, MA: Hampden

Highway system
- Connecticut State Highway System; Interstate; US; State; SSR; SR; Scenic
| ← Route 185 | → Route 187 |
| ← Route 183 | MA | → Route 187 |

Route 186 is a 6-mile-long (9.7 km) numbered route in the U.S. states of Connecticut and Massachusetts, serving the southeastern suburbs of Springfield, Massachusetts. The route runs from Route 190 in the Somersville section of the Connecticut town of Somers to the town center of East Longmeadow, Massachusetts. Within Massachusetts, the road is town-maintained.

== Route description ==
Route 186 begins at an intersection with Route 190 in the Somersville section of Somers and heads north for about 3.6 miles (5.8 km) to the Massachusetts state line. The road continues across the Connecticut-Massachusetts state line as Prospect Street for another 2.4 miles (3.9 km) towards East Longmeadow center. Route 186 ends at a complex seven-way intersection (the East Longmeadow Rotary) involving Route 83 (North Main Street and Somers Road), Route 220 (Shaker Road), Maple Street, Elm Street, and Pleasant Street. In Connecticut, Route 186 is known as Hall Hill Road, named after the 320-foot Hall Hil, which the road climbs over. Route 186 is classified as an urban collector road and carries average daily volumes of 2,000 vehicles.

== History ==
Route 186 was established as a new route in the 1932 state highway renumbering in Connecticut. The continuation in Massachusetts, which was previously unnumbered, was designated in 1939. In 1951, the southern end of Route 186 was relocated to use Four Bridges Road to end at Route 83. As part of the 1962 Route Reclassification Act, the southern alignment was returned to its original location.

== Major intersections ==
| State | County | Location | mi | km | Destinations | Notes |
|---|---|---|---|---|---|---|
| Connecticut | Tolland | Somers | 0.00 | 0.00 | Route 190 – Stafford Springs, Enfield | Southern terminus |
| Connecticut–Massachusetts state line | | | 3.57 0.00 | 5.75 0.00 | Route transition | |
| Massachusetts | Hampden | East Longmeadow | 2.43 | 3.91 | Route 83 / Route 220 south – Springfield, Agawam, Hampden, Somers, CT, Enfield, CT | Northern terminus; 5 Corners rotary; northern terminus of Route 220 |
1.000 mi = 1.609 km; 1.000 km = 0.621 mi: Route transition
