= Route 189 (Connecticut–Massachusetts) =

Highway in Connecticut and Massachusetts

Route 189
- Map of northern Connecticut and southern Massachusetts with CT 189 in solid red and MA 189 in dotted red

Route information
- Maintained by ConnDOT and MassDOT
- Length: 22.43 mi (36.10 km) 20.32 miles (32.70 km) in CT; 2.11 miles (3.40 km) in MA
- Existed: 1932–present

Major junctions
- South end: US 44 in Hartford, CT
- Route 187 in Bloomfield, CT
- North end: Route 57 in Granville, MA

Location
- Country: United States
- States: Connecticut, Massachusetts
- Counties: CT: Hartford, MA: Hampden

Highway system
- Connecticut State Highway System; Interstate; US; State; SSR; SR; Scenic
| ← Route 188 | → Route 190 |
| ← Route 187 | MA | → I-190 |

Route 189 is a 22.43-mile-long (36.10 km) state route in the U.S. states of Connecticut and Massachusetts. The route begins in the northwestern portion of the Connecticut state capital of Hartford and ends in the rural town of Granville. In Massachusetts, the route is not a state highway and is maintained by the town of Granville.

== Route description ==
Route 189 begins at an intersection with US 44 in western Hartford and heads northwest, crossing into West Hartford. It passes the University of Hartford and the eastern end of Route 185, continuing northwest across the northeastern corner of West Hartford and crossing into Bloomfield. In Bloomfield, it continues north, crossing Route 218, and passes through the center of town where it intersects Route 178. North of town, it turns slightly northeast, and meets Route 187 to form a four-lane freeway. After Route 187 veers off to the north, it becomes a two-lane freeway before crossing into Simsbury. In Simsbury, it enters the Tariffville section of town, where it becomes a two-lane surface road and meets the eastern end of Route 315 before crossing the Farmington River into East Granby. In East Granby, it continues northwest to Granby. In Granby, it continues northwest, briefly overlapping US 202/Route 10, immediately followed by a brief overlap with Route 20. It then continues northwest across the northwest portion of town, and crosses the Massachusetts state line into the town of Granville, ending at an intersection with Route 57 in the town center.

== History ==
The route from Granby center northwest through North Granby to the Massachusetts state line was designated in 1922 as State Highway 206. In the 1932 state highway renumbering, Route 189 was established as a new designation for old Highway 206. It originally ran from Route 20 in Granby to the state line. At the same time, Massachusetts designated the continuation as Route 189 in Granville to Route 57. The portion south of Route 20 was, at the time, designated as part of Route 9. Before 1932, this portion was still part of New England Route 10. The original Route 9 in Bloomfield followed Tunxis Avenue into Tariffville before continuing north along Hartford Avenue, crossing the Farmington River three times in the process. In 1960, five years after two of the bridges were washed out in a flood, Route 9 was relocated to stay on the south side of the river along a newly built expressway. In 1963, with the opening of the Route 9 freeway south of Hartford, the section of Route 9 from US 44 in Hartford to Route 20 in Granby was reassigned as a southern extension of Route 189.

== Major intersections ==
| State | County | Location | mi | km | Destinations | Notes |
|---|---|---|---|---|---|---|
| Connecticut | Hartford | Hartford | 0.00 | 0.00 | US 44 – Hartford, West Hartford | Southern terminus |
| Connecticut | Hartford | West Hartford | 0.82 | 1.32 | Route 185 west – Weatogue, Simsbury | Eastern terminus of Route 185 |
| Connecticut | Hartford | Bloomfield | 2.46 | 3.96 | Route 218 – West Hartford, Windsor | |
| Connecticut | Hartford | Bloomfield | 3.46 | 5.57 | Route 178 – Simsbury, Windsor | |
| Connecticut | Hartford | Bloomfield | 7.16 | 11.52 | Route 187 south – Windsor | Southern end of Route 187 concurrency |
| Connecticut | Hartford | Bloomfield | 7.16 | 11.52 | Southern end of freeway section | |
| Connecticut | Hartford | Bloomfield | 7.65 | 12.31 | Tariffville Road | |
| Connecticut | Hartford | Bloomfield | 8.18 | 13.16 | Route 187 north – East Granby, Bradley International Airport, Suffield | Northern end of Route 187 concurrency |
| Connecticut | Hartford | Simsbury | 9.33 | 15.02 | Northern end of freeway section | |
| Connecticut | Hartford | Simsbury | 9.33 | 15.02 | Route 315 west – Simsbury | Eastern terminus of Route 315 |
| Connecticut | Hartford | East Granby | 10.24 | 16.48 | Hatchet Hill Road (SR 540 east) | |
| Connecticut | Hartford | Granby | 12.87– 12.96 | 20.71– 20.86 | US 202 / Route 10 – East Granby, Bradley International Airport | |
| Connecticut | Hartford | Granby | 12.96– 13.21 | 20.86– 21.26 | Route 20 – West Granby, East Hartland, Winsted | |
| Connecticut | Hartford | Granby | | | Mountain Road (SR 539 west) | |
| Connecticut–Massachusetts state line | | | 20.32 0.00 | 32.70 0.00 | Route transition | |
| Massachusetts | Hampden | Granville | 2.11 | 3.40 | Route 57 (Main Road) | Northern terminus |
1.000 mi = 1.609 km; 1.000 km = 0.621 mi: Concurrency terminus; Route transition
