= Route 192 (Connecticut–Massachusetts) =

Highway in Connecticut and Massachusetts

Route 192
- Map of northern Connecticut and southern Massachusetts with CT 192 in solid red and MA 192 highlighted in dotted red

Route information
- Maintained by ConnDOT and Town of Longmeadow
- Length: 5.71 mi (9.19 km) 3.49 miles (5.62 km) in CT; 2.22 miles (3.57 km) in MA
- Existed: 1932 (CT 192); 1939 (MA 192)–present

Major junctions
- South end: Route 190 in Enfield, CT
- North end: US 5 in Longmeadow, MA

Location
- Country: United States
- States: Connecticut, Massachusetts
- Counties: CT: Hartford, MA: Hampden

Highway system
- Connecticut State Highway System; Interstate; US; State; SSR; SR; Scenic
← Route 191	→ Route 193
← I-190	MA	→ Route 193

Route 192 is a 5.71-mile-long (9.19 km) state route in the U.S. states of Connecticut and Massachusetts, serving the southeastern suburbs of Springfield. It connects the Hazardville section of the town of Enfield, Connecticut, to the town center of Longmeadow, Massachusetts. The Massachusetts portion of the route is maintained by the town, as opposed to MassDOT.

== Route description ==
Route 192 begins as North Maple Street at an intersection with Route 190 in the Hazardville section of Enfield. It heads north to the village of North Thompsonville, where it intersects with Route 220. It continues north until Shaker Pines Lake, where the road then curves to the west. After about 0.3 miles (0.48 km), the road splits, with Route 192 following the right branch northwest towards the Massachusetts state line. The road continues north across the state line as Shaker Road towards the town center of Longmeadow. After 1.7 miles (2.7 km), Route 192 turns west onto Williams Street until it ends at an intersection with U.S. Route 5. Route 192 is a two-lane secondary road for its entire length. It is classified as a minor arterial road and carries traffic volumes of about 4,400 vehicles per day.

== History ==
Route 192 was established as a new route in Connecticut during the 1932 state highway renumbering. Massachusetts extended the route number into Longmeadow in 1939. Route 192 has not had any significant changes since it was designated.

== Major intersections ==
County	Location	mi	km	Destinations	Notes
Hartford	Enfield	0.00	0.00	Route 190 – Suffield, Somers	Southern terminus
Hartford	Enfield	1.62	2.61	Route 220 – Thompsonville, East Longmeadow, MA	
Connecticut–Massachusetts state line		3.49 0.00	5.62 0.00	Route transition	
Hampden	Longmeadow	2.22	3.57	US 5 (Longmeadow Street) – Enfield, CT	Northern terminus; to I-91
1.000 mi = 1.609 km; 1.000 km = 0.621 mi: Route transition
