= William Hayden (soldier) =

Major General William Hayden
- Born: Windsor, CT
- Died: Windsor, CT
- Military career
- Allegiance: United States
- Branch: United States Army
- Rank: Major General
- Commands: Connecticut State Militia
- Website: www.ct.gov/mil

William Hayden, was the Adjutant General of the State of Connecticut from 1835 to 1836. The Hayden family was a prominent family of Windsor, Connecticut and among the first settlers to the region. The family traces its roots back to England and the services of King Henry VIII.

Military offices
Preceded by George Cowles	Connecticut Adjutant General; 1835 - 1836	Succeeded by Samuel L. Pitkin
