= Samuel L. Pitkin =

American soldier

General Samuel L. Pitkin
- Born: April 1, 1803; Hartford, CT
- Died: February 18, 1845 (aged 41); East Hartford, CT
- Alma mater: Norwich University
- Spouse: Mary Ann Lewis
- Military career
- Allegiance: United States
- Branch: United States Army
- Rank: Major General
- Commands: Connecticut State Militia
- Website: www.ct.gov/mil

Samuel L. Pitkin, born in Hartford, Connecticut on April 1, 1803, was the Adjutant General for the State of Connecticut from 1837 to 1839. He was a member of the Pitkin family of Hartford, who were very active in politics, the military, industry and banking in early Connecticut. His great-great-great grandfather, William Pitkin, emigrated to the new world from England in 1635 after receiving an inheritance. His grandson, also named William Pitkin would serve as governor of Connecticut Colony from 1766 to 1769.

== Pitkin Family Lineage ==
Samuel’s family traces its roots to William, who immigrated to the United States with a sizeable inheritance and a legal education. The family settled on the east side of the Connecticut River in what is now East Hartford, Connecticut but was then Hartford. With their proximity to the political center of the colony and the industrial and economic power of the Connecticut River, the family was in a prime position to prosper. His son, also named William, would continue to be involved in law and rise to the position of Chief Justice of the Superior Court. He would also establish Pitkin Mills in what became the Burnside village of East Hartford that was dominated by various mills.

The family established clothing mills and continued to educate the males in the field of law. Their legal training enabled them to become active in politics by assisting in settling civil disputes. Samuel’s great-great uncle, William III, was known for his fairness and skill as a mediator and was appointed to the Council of War in 1740. This began the family’s involvement in military affairs in the state. He ultimately became governor of the colony in 1766 until his death in 1769.

Exit sign off of Route 2 to Pitkin Street in East Hartford, Connecticut, in honor of the Pitkin family

Samuel’s great grandfather, Joseph, continued the tradition of political and military service, rising to the rank of colonel of the 1st Regiment in 1751 as well as serving for twenty years on the Connecticut General Assembly. The family also became involved in the religious leadership of the community where Joseph became a Deacon of the Third Church of Hartford. In addition to inheriting Pitkin Mills and running it with his brothers, he started Forge Falls, a producer of gunpowder that would be outlawed by the British Parliament in 1750 and manufacture powder for the Continental Army during the American Revolution.

Pitkin Glassworks was created by the next generation of which Samuel’s grandfather, Squire Elisha Pitkin was a contributor in current Manchester, CT. The glassworks would contribute greatly to the financial fortunes of the family as the company was granted a 25-year monopoly for the manufacturing of glass in Connecticut by the General Assembly (of which many family members were representatives).

Samuel Pitkin, the father of Samuel L. Pitkin, served in the General Assembly for thirteen years to continue the family tradition of political service. He also served as a Deacon in the Third Church of Hartford and established the Sabbath School, serving as its first superintendent.

== Early life ==
Samuel L. Pitkin was the youngest of three children and only son born to Samuel Pitkin and Sarah Parsons. His older sisters were Sarah (born February 21, 1794) and Frances (born May 1, 1799). He attended school in Hartford and attended the American Literary, Scientific, and Military Academy in 1821, shortly after the founding of the school in 1819 in Norwich, Vermont. He wrote a series of letters that are currently being preserved by the school that relate his experiences at the school. He graduated in 1823.

== Career ==
Upon graduation he continued the family tradition of being involved in military service, politics and business. He worked at Pitkin Mills, where the mill continued the production of gunpowder for military units in Connecticut and throughout the new nation. He also served as state senator for Connecticut’s second district, representing the City of East Hartford.

Having received military training while at college, Samuel entered military service in the State of Connecticut and was appointed to Adjutant General in 1837 at the age of 34. Under his command, the Connecticut State Militia expanded by five companies and grew to a strength of 29,967 men. Under state law at the time, all able-bodied men between the ages of 18 and 45 in the state were required to enrolling in the state militia but there were no laws administering a punishment if they did not. General Pitkin advocated the passing of state statutes to fine personnel who failed to enroll and also to fine those who left service without returning equipment. He also advocated modernizing the militia with modern equipment as tension with Mexico continued to increase.

== Personal life ==
Samuel married Mary Ann Lewis of New Haven, Connecticut in 1831. They would have five children: Charles Lewis Pitkin, William Henry Pitkin, Sarah Augusta Pitkin, Marianna Lewis Pitkin, and James Sherwood Pitkin. He would die suddenly on February 18, 1845, in East Hartford, CT.

Military offices
Preceded by William Hayden	Connecticut Adjutant General; 1837 - 1839	Succeeded by Charles T. Hillyer
