= Route 220 (Connecticut–Massachusetts) =

Highway in Connecticut and Massachusetts

Route 220
- Map of northern Connecticut with CT 220 highlighted in solid red and of southern Massachusetts with MA 220 highlighted in dotted red

Route information
- Maintained by CTDOT
- Length: 7.95 mi (12.79 km) Connecticut: 5.78 mi Massachusetts: 2.17 mi
- Existed: 1936–present

Major junctions
- West end: US 5 in Enfield, CT
- I-91 in Enfield, CT
- North end: Route 83 / Route 186 in East Longmeadow, MA

Location
- Country: United States
- States: Connecticut, Massachusetts
- Counties: CT: Tolland, MA: Hampden

Highway system
- Connecticut State Highway System; Interstate; US; State; SSR; SR; Scenic
← Route 219	→ Route 222
← Route 213	MA	→ Route 225

Route 220 is a 7.95-mile-long (12.79 km) state route in northern Connecticut and western Massachusetts, serving the southeastern suburbs of Springfield. The route runs in an "L" pattern and connects the town of Enfield, Connecticut, to the town of East Longmeadow. The route serves the Thompsonville and North Thompsonville sections of Enfield, connecting them to East Longmeadow center. In Connecticut, Route 220 is signed east-west. In Massachusetts, Route 220 is a town-maintained road and it is signed north-south.

== Route description ==
Route 220 begins as Elm Street at an intersection with US 5 in the Thompsonville section of the town of Enfield. It heads east, intersecting I-91 (at exit 48) after 0.4 miles (0.64 km) near Enfield Square Mall. Route 220 then shifts to use Shaker Road heading northeast for about three miles (5 km) and intersecting with Route 192 along the way. In the vicinity of the state correctional facility, Route 220 turns north along Taylor Road. Shaker Road continues as unsigned Special Service Road 404, which leads to the main building of the correctional facility. Route 220 runs for another 1.4 miles (2.3 km) to the Massachusetts state line at East Longmeadow. In East Longmeadow, Route 220 continues for another 2.2 miles (3.5 km) as Shaker Road, ending at a complex seven-way intersection (the East Longmeadow Rotary) that involves Route 83 and Route 186, among other roads.

== History ==
In 1936, modern Route 220 was designated as a route from Route 192 via the State Correctional Facility to the Massachusetts state line, with Massachusetts continuing the route as a town-maintained numbered road to East Longmeadow center. As part of the 1962 Route Reclassification Act, the Taylor Road portion of Route 220 was to be redesignated as part of an extended Route 191. However, in 1963, the decision was reversed and Route 220 remained intact with an additional westward extension along Elm Street to US 5.

== Major intersections ==
State	County	Location	mi	km	Destinations	Notes
Connecticut	Hartford	Enfield	0.00	0.00	US 5 to Route 190 – Longmeadow, Enfield, Suffield	Western terminus
Connecticut	Hartford	Enfield	0.44	0.71	I-91 – Hartford, Springfield	Exit 48 on I-91
Connecticut	Hartford	Enfield	2.86	4.60	Route 192 – Hazardville, Longmeadow	
Connecticut	Hartford	Enfield	4.38	7.05	Shaker Road (SSR 404)	
Connecticut–Massachusetts state line			5.78 0.00	9.30 0.00	Route transition	
Massachusetts	Hampden	East Longmeadow	2.17	3.49	Route 83 / Route 186 south – Springfield, Agawam, Hampden, Somersville, CT, Hazardville, CT, Somers, CT	Northern terminus; 5 Corners rotary; northern terminus of Route 186
1.000 mi = 1.609 km; 1.000 km = 0.621 mi
