= Tariffville, Connecticut =

Census-designated place in Connecticut, United States

- Census-designated place
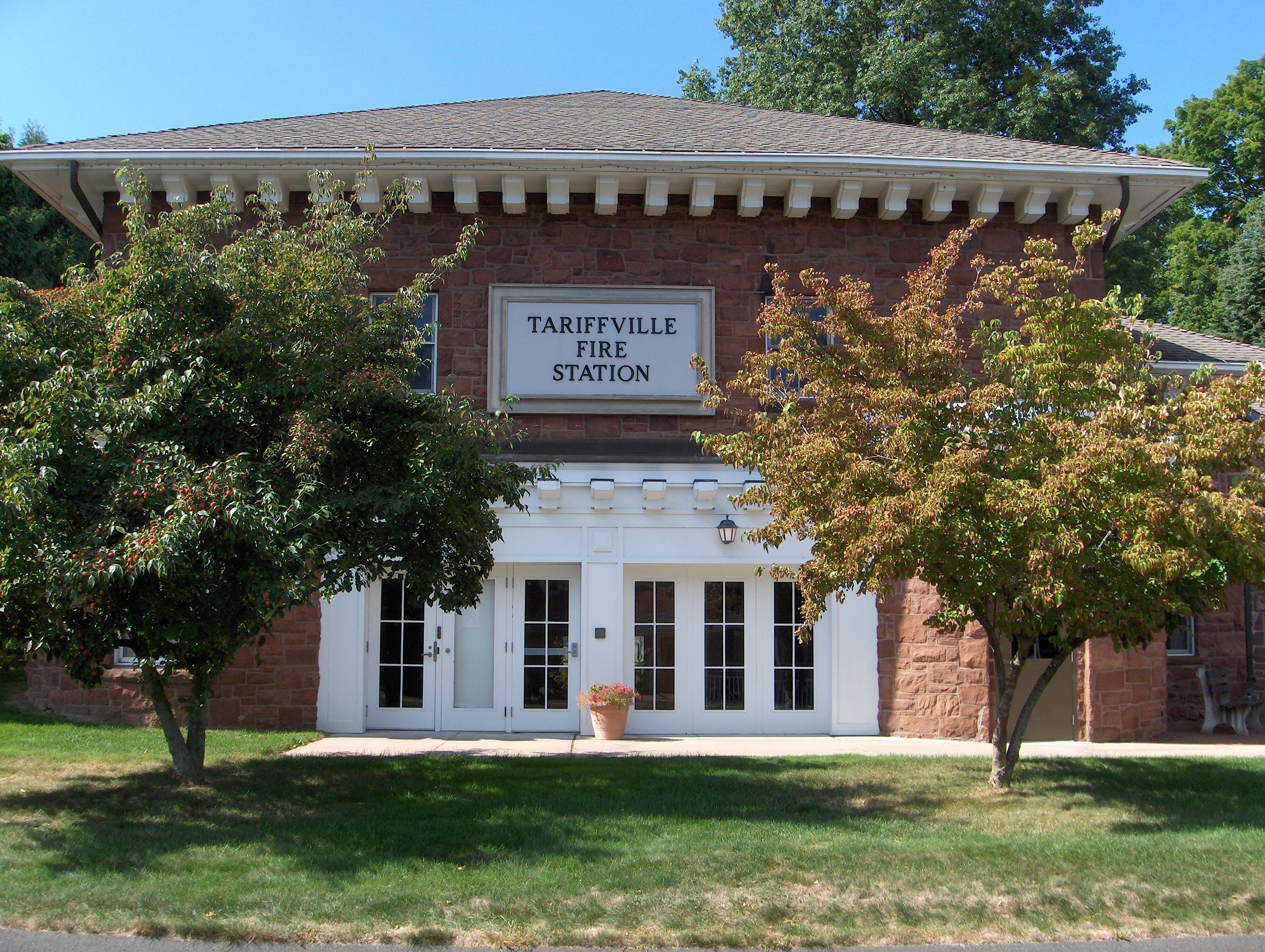
- Tariffville Fire Station

- Location within Connecticut Location within the United States
- Coordinates: 41°54′30″N 72°45′50″W
- Country: United States
- State: Connecticut
- County: Hartford
- Town: Simsbury

Area
  - Total: 0.65 sq mi (1.69 km^{2})
  - Land: 0.60 sq mi (1.55 km^{2})
  - Water: 0.050 sq mi (0.13 km^{2})
- Elevation: 200 ft (61 m)

Population (2010)
  - Total: 1,324
  - Density: 2,207/sq mi (852.2/km^{2})
- Time zone: UTC-5 (Eastern)
  - Summer (DST): UTC-4 (Eastern)
- ZIP code: 06081
- Area code: 860
- FIPS code: 09-75100
- GNIS feature ID: 2377870

Tariffville is a neighborhood and census-designated place (CDP) in the town of Simsbury, Connecticut, United States. As of the 2020 census, Tariffville had a population of 1,324. It is a popular location for whitewater paddlers who use the Farmington River.

Part of the original mill village area is included in the Tariffville Historic District, listed on the National Register of Historic Places. The historic district excludes newer development around West Point Terrace and Hayes Road, as well as properties along White Water Turn, Wooster Road, and Main Street Extension. The historic district is architecturally significant for preserving some evidence of early nineteenth-century mill village characteristics (in retaining some old mill housing and street layout) and for also preserving later 19th-century Greek Revival and Gothic Revival structures.

== Geography ==
Tariffville is in the northeastern corner of the town of Simsbury, on the inside of a sharp bend in the Farmington River. The northeastern and northwestern borders of the CDP follow the river, with the northeastern part also forming the town line with East Granby. The southeastern border of the CDP follows the crest of Talcott Mountain and is the town line with Bloomfield. The southern border of the CDP follows a line just south of West Point Terrace, from Talcott Mountain back down to the river.

Connecticut Route 189 (Hartford Avenue) runs through the eastern end of Tariffville, leading north 3.5 miles (5.6 km) to Granby and south 12 miles (19 km) to Hartford. Connecticut Route 315 passes through the center of Tariffville as Elm Street and Tariffville Road.

According to the United States Census Bureau, the CDP has a total area of 0.7 square miles (1.7 km^{2}), of which 0.6 square miles (1.6 km^{2}) is land and 0.04 square miles (0.1 km^{2}), or 7.98%, is water.

== History ==
In 1825 (or 1827), the Tariff Manufacturing Company built a carpet mill along the Farmington River, giving its name to the area. The company name came from the Tariff Act of 1824 which included protective tariffs for a number of products, including wool and cotton textiles. The area did not have sufficient housing for the workers, so the company built housing, some of which survives today. The carpet business survived for a few decades, but by 1867, the primary industry in the area was sorting and packing of tobacco. The tobacco business would continue as the chief industry through the 1930s. The town was the site of a major rail accident, the Tariffville train crash, in 1878.

The first steel manufacturing plant in the country was established in Tariffville at a site on the Farmington River in 1727.

== Demographics ==
=== 2020 census ===
As of the 2020 census, Tariffville had a population of 1,324. The median age was 41.3 years. 22.2% of residents were under the age of 18 and 14.0% of residents were 65 years of age or older. For every 100 females there were 88.6 males, and for every 100 females age 18 and over there were 87.6 males age 18 and over.

100.0% of residents lived in urban areas, while 0.0% lived in rural areas.

There were 626 households in Tariffville, of which 28.4% had children under the age of 18 living in them. Of all households, 36.7% were married-couple households, 21.4% were households with a male householder and no spouse or partner present, and 33.7% were households with a female householder and no spouse or partner present. About 37.8% of all households were made up of individuals and 11.5% had someone living alone who was 65 years of age or older.

There were 671 housing units, of which 6.7% were vacant. The homeowner vacancy rate was 2.7% and the rental vacancy rate was 7.1%.

Racial composition as of the 2020 census
| Race | Number | Percent |
|---|---|---|
| White | 1,056 | 79.8% |
| Black or African American | 84 | 6.3% |
| American Indian and Alaska Native | 5 | 0.4% |
| Asian | 48 | 3.6% |
| Native Hawaiian and Other Pacific Islander | 1 | 0.1% |
| Some other race | 32 | 2.4% |
| Two or more races | 98 | 7.4% |
| Hispanic or Latino (of any race) | 108 | 8.2% |

=== 2000 census ===
As of the census of 2000, there were 1,371 people, 618 households, and 376 families residing in the CDP. The population density was 2,260.3 inhabitants per square mile (872.7/km^{2}). There were 638 housing units at an average density of 1,051.8 per square mile (406.1/km^{2}). The racial makeup of the CDP was 92.41% White, 2.70% African American, 0.29% Native American, 2.04% Asian, 0.29% from other races, and 2.26% from two or more races. Hispanic or Latino of any race were 1.02% of the population.

There were 618 households, out of which 29.6% had children under the age of 18 living with them, 46.1% were married couples living together, 11.5% had a female householder with no husband present, and 39.0% were non-families. 33.2% of all households were made up of individuals, and 9.5% had someone living alone who was 65 years of age or older. The average household size was 2.22 and the average family size was 2.87.

In the CDP, the population was spread out, with 23.3% under the age of 18, 5.7% from 18 to 24, 35.1% from 25 to 44, 23.9% from 45 to 64, and 12.0% who were 65 years of age or older. The median age was 38 years. For every 100 females, there were 95.3 males. For every 100 females age 18 and over, there were 86.9 males.

The median income for a household in the CDP was $60,000, and the median income for a family was $65,096. Males had a median income of $42,750 versus $32,132 for females. The per capita income for the CDP was $27,585. About 5.3% of families and 9.5% of the population were below the poverty line, including 13.6% of those under age 18 and 16.0% of those age 65 or over.
