= 1878 Tariffville train crash =

1878 railroad accident in Connecticut

Coordinates: 41.907°N 72.775°W

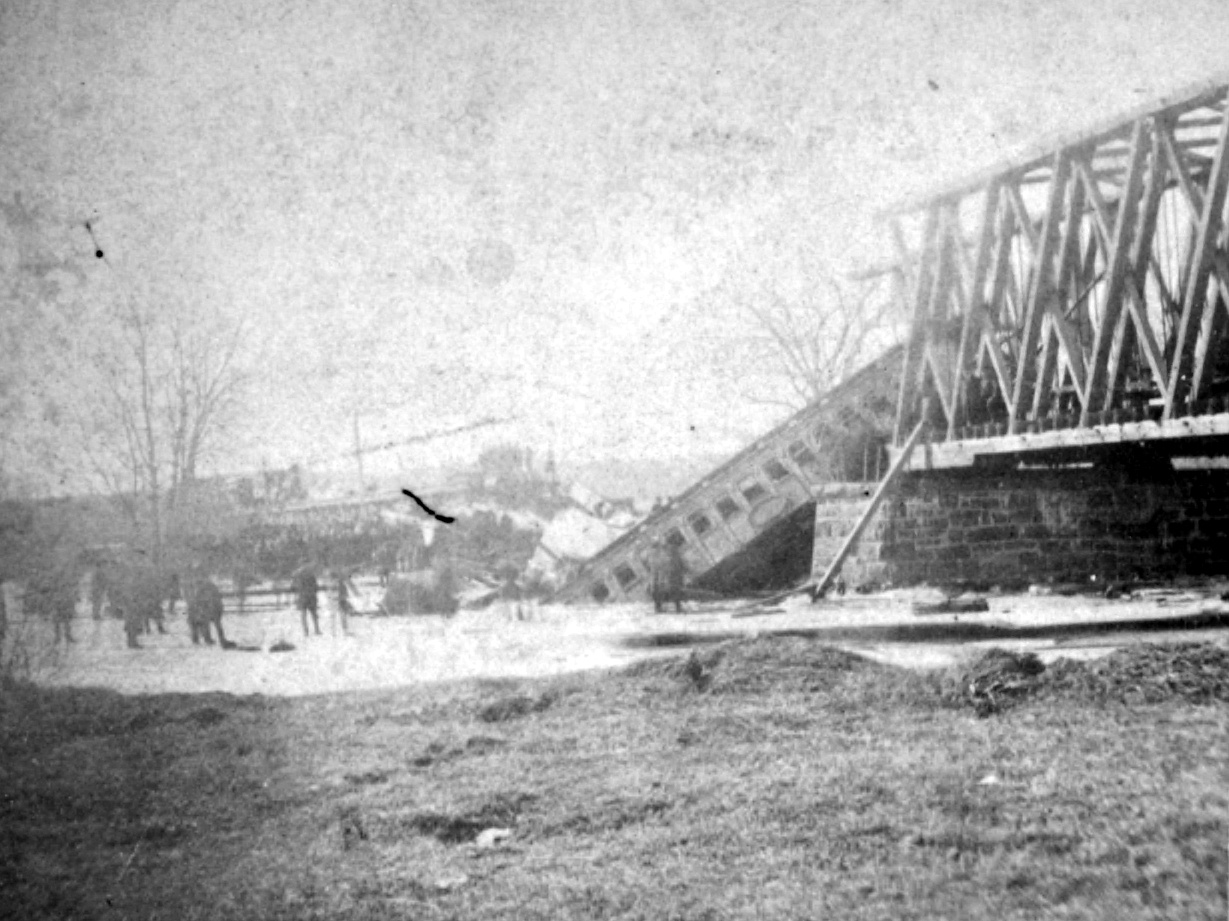
The wrecked train photographed the next day

The Tariffville train crash was a railroad accident that occurred on January 15, 1878 on the Connecticut Western line, then a 69 mi (111 km) route linking Hartford and the Hudson Valley.

On January 15, 1878, around 10:00 PM, a passenger train returning from Hartford crossed the wooden bridge spanning the Farmington River at Tariffville, as one of the two main bridge spans collapsed, dropping two locomotives, one baggage car and three passenger coaches into the icy river. Some people from New Hartford hitching a ride between the cars were killed when they were thrown beneath the wreck. The wreck claimed 13 lives and injured more than 70, some severely. Many of the passengers were returning from a Protestant revival meeting in Hartford featuring well-known evangelist Dwight L. Moody.

Residents of Tariffville provided emergency assistance for passengers and provided them with dry clothing and shelter. Dr. D.P. Pelletier was the first Hartford surgeon notified of the accident. He went to a drug store on Capitol Avenue and used the store's telephone to summon other doctors for a relief train in what is possibly the first emergency telephone call. A special relief train carrying physicians and other rescue personnel was sent that became known as the "Samaritan Special."
