= Tariffville Historic District =

Historic district in Connecticut, United States

- U.S. National Register of Historic Places
- U.S. Historic district
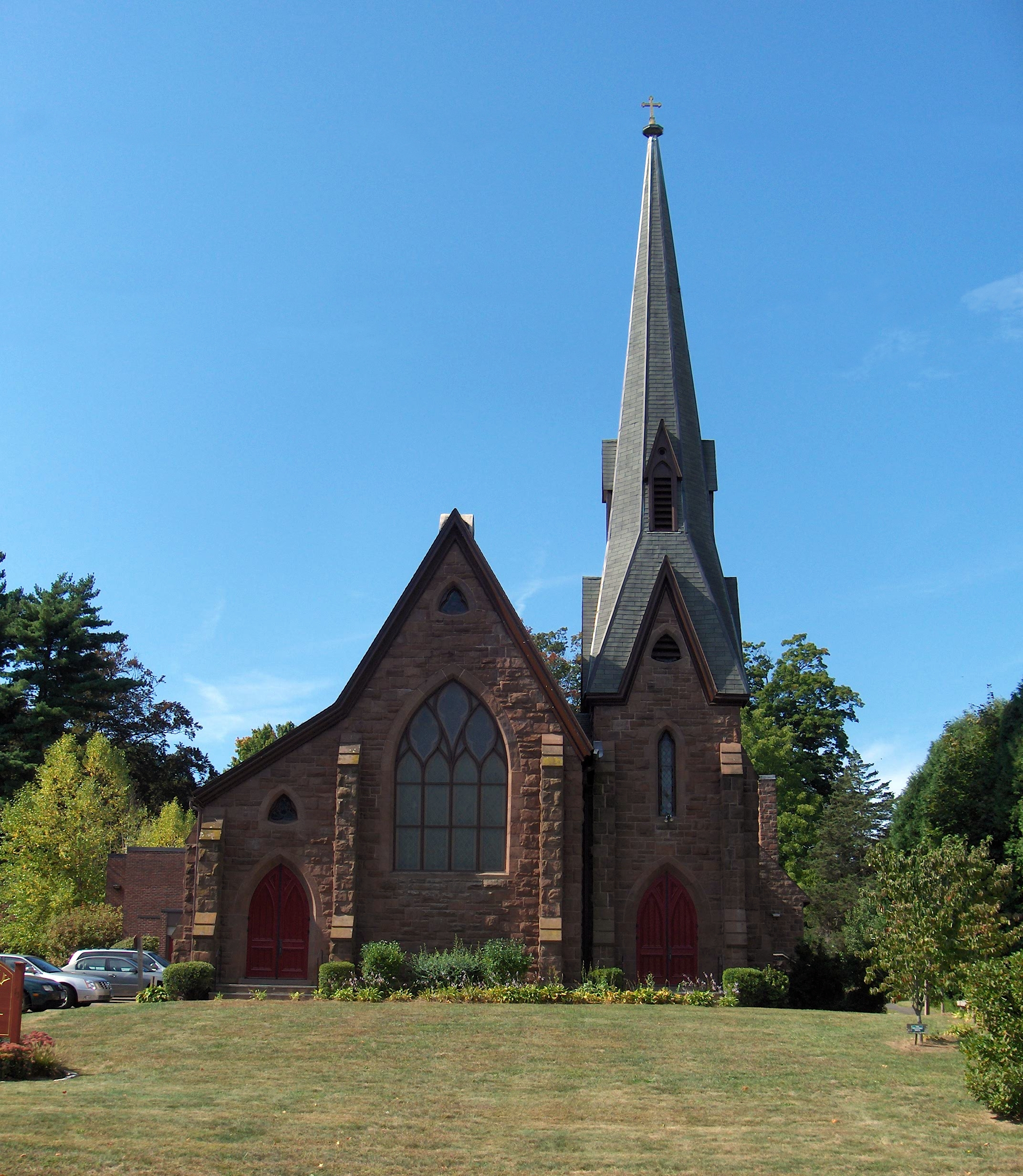
- Trinity Episcopal Church

- Location within Connecticut Location within the United States
- Location: Roughly bounded by Winthrop Street, Main Street, Tunxis Road, Mountain Road, and Elm Street, Simsbury, Connecticut
- Coordinates: 41°54′36″N 72°45′53″W
- Area: 93 acres (38 ha)
- Built: 1824
- Architect: Dudley, Henry C.
- Architectural style: Greek Revival, Colonial, Queen Anne
- NRHP reference No.: 93000173
- Added to NRHP: April 2, 1993

The Tariffville Historic District is a 93 acres (38 ha) historic district in the town of Simsbury, Connecticut. It was listed on the National Register of Historic Places in 1993. It is part of the Tariffville section of Simsbury. The district includes 165 contributing buildings and two contributing sites. It also includes 26 non-contributing buildings and 4 non-contributing sites. There are several houses in the district of Gothic Revival style, probably following designs from pattern books of architect Andrew Jackson Downing. The Trinity Episcopal Church is the only building in the district designed by an architect of national standing, namely Henry C. Dudley. Many of the homes in the area were built by the Tariff Manufacturing Company, which opened a carpet mill along the Farmington River, and needed housing for workers.

The historic district is "significant architecturally because it retains the mill housing and street layout of an early 19th-century village as well as the Greek Revival and Gothic Revival structures of later 19th-century development. The commercial blocks, religious structures, and publicly owned buildings, together with the many 19th-century houses and their outbuildings, tell the story of the community's development into the 20th century with integrity and few intrusions." Its boundaries are "drawn to encompass the concentration of historic and architectural resources" of the historic village area. The historic district excludes newer development around West Point Terrace and Hayes Road, as well as properties along White Water Turn, Wooster Road, and Main Street Extension.

Significant contributing properties include:

- Trinity Church (see #10 of NRHP application's accompanying photographs).
- William Ketchin Tobacco Company warehouse, 7 Church Street, brownstone "with low towers and castellated roof lines, it has now been dramatically altered by adding a hipped roof of great volume supported by new heavy roof brackets in a modern salute to the Italianate style" (see photo #14)
- 8-4 Elm Street, worker housing (photo #1)
- 23-29 Red Hill Road, worker housing (photo #2)
- 39 Tunxis Road, small Greek Revival (photo #3)
- 19 Main Street (see photo #4)
- 40 Winthrop Street (see photo #5)
- 2 Tunxis Road (see photos #6 and #7)
- 28 Main Street (see photo #8)
- 32 Main Street (see photo #9)
- Saint Bernard's Church (see photo #12)
- 37 Elm Street (see photo #13)
- 10 Center Street (see photo #15)

== See also ==
- National Register of Historic Places listings in Hartford County, Connecticut
