= Connecticut Route 218 =

State highway in Hartford County, Connecticut, US

Route 218
- Map of Hartford County in northern Connecticut with Route 218 highlighted in red

Route information
- Maintained by CTDOT
- Length: 7.00 mi (11.27 km)
- Existed: 1935–present

Major junctions
- West end: US 44 in West Hartford
- I-291 in Windsor; I-91 in Windsor
- East end: I-291 / Route 159 in Windsor

Location
- Country: United States
- State: Connecticut
- Counties: Hartford

Highway system
- Connecticut State Highway System; Interstate; US; State; SSR; SR; Scenic
← Route 217	→ Route 219

Route 218 is a 7.00-mile (11.27 km) state highway in the U.S. state of Connecticut. It is located in the northwestern suburbs of Hartford, traveling in an L-shaped pattern from West Hartford to Windsor.

== Route description ==
Route 218 begins as North Main Street at an intersection with US 44 in West Hartford and heads north for about 1.4 miles (2.3 km) into the town of Bloomfield, becoming Hall Boulevard. In the vicinity of the town line, Route 218 briefly becomes a four-lane road for about 0.4 miles (0.64 km) after its intersection with Route 185. Hall Boulevard continues north through southern Bloomfield following along Tumble Brook, then turns east at Cottage Grove Road, assuming the Cottage Grove name. Route 218 becomes a partially controlled-access divided four-lane highway for about four miles (6 km) as it runs east through southern Bloomfield. Along the way, it intersects Route 189 and Route 187. Just east of Route 187, Route 218 becomes undivided, but maintains 4 lanes, and soon reaches the Windsor. In Windsor, it continues east, intersecting the ramps to and from I-291 at its western end. The road then runs parallel to I-291 and soon crosses over I-91 at Exit 35B as part of the I-91/I-291 interchange. It continues east for another half mile to end at an intersection with Route 159.

The easternmost 0.60 miles (0.97 km) of Route 218 are designated the Putnam Memorial Highway.

== History ==
Route 218 was commissioned in 1935 from previously unnumbered state roads, running from the current route of Route 189 in West Hartford (via modern Route 185) to the current route of Route 187 in Bloomfield. In 1963, the southern sections of Routes 185 and 218 were exchanged, resulting in the current western terminus of Route 218 at US 44. In 1982, it was rerouted along the Mount St. Benedict connector to the current intersection with Route 187. In 1992, Route 218 was extended to its current eastern terminus in preparation for the construction of I-291 from 1992 to 1994.

Route 218 serves the corridor that was to be part of the northwest quadrant of the I-291 Hartford Beltway that was canceled in the 1970s due to environmental and community opposition.

== Major intersections ==
The entire route is in Hartford County.

Location	mi	km	Destinations	Notes
West Hartford	0.00	0.00	US 44 (Albany Avenue) – Hartford, Avon	Western terminus
Bloomfield	1.44	2.32	Route 185 – Weatogue, Simsbury, Hartford	
Bloomfield	2.68	4.31	Route 189 – Bloomfield, Simsbury, Hartford	
Bloomfield	4.97	8.00	Route 187 – Bloomfield, East Granby, Hartford	
Windsor	6.00	9.66	I-291 east – South Windsor, Manchester	Western terminus and exit 1B on I-291; former Route 291
Windsor	6.57	10.57	I-91 – Hartford, Springfield	Exit 42B on I-91
Windsor	7.00	11.27	I-291 east / Route 159 – Wilson, Windsor, South Windsor, Manchester	Eastern terminus; exit 1D on I-291
1.000 mi = 1.609 km; 1.000 km = 0.621 mi
