= Lists of North American area codes =

The largest telephone numbering plan in North American is the North American Numbering Plan (NANP), serving 25 regions or countries. Other countries maintain an autonomous numbering plan with distinct country codes within the international E.164 specifications by the International Telecommunication Union.

- Original North American area codes
- List of North American Numbering Plan area codes
- Telephone numbers in Mexico
- Telephone numbers in Greenland
- Telephone numbers in Saint Pierre and Miquelon

== See also ==
- Category:Telephone numbers by country
