= Interstate 291 (Connecticut) =

Highway in Hartford County, Connecticut, US

Interstate 291
- Vietnam Veterans Memorial Highway
- I-291 highlighted in red

Route information
- Auxiliary route of I-91
- Maintained by CTDOT
- Length: 6.02 mi (9.69 km)
- Existed: 1958 (as Route 291); 1994 (as I-291)–present
- NHS: Entire route

Major junctions
- West end: I-91 / Route 218 in Windsor
- US 5 / Route 30 in South Windsor
- East end: I-84 in Manchester

Location
- Country: United States
- State: Connecticut
- Counties: Hartford

Highway system
- Interstate Highway System; Main; Auxiliary; Suffixed; Business; Future; Connecticut State Highway System; Interstate; US; State; SSR; SR; Scenic
← Route 289	→ Route 302

Interstate 291 (I-291) is a short auxiliary Interstate Highway in the state of Connecticut that starts at I-91 at its junction with Route 218 in Windsor and ends at I-84 in Manchester. It serves as a northeastern bypass of Hartford. According to the Federal Highway Administration, the official length of I-291 is 6.02 miles (9.69 km); however, the Connecticut Department of Transportation (CTDOT) includes the 0.38 miles (0.61 km) of the exit ramp that I-291 uses to merge with eastbound I-84, making their recorded length 6.4 miles (10.3 km) long.

I-291 is also known as the Vietnam Veterans Memorial Highway for its entire length.

== Route description ==
I-291 begins at I-91 in Windsor at an interchange that also provides access to and from Route 218. Heading southeast, I-291 has a partial interchange with Route 159, then crosses the Connecticut River on the Bissell Bridge. Originally constructed in 1957, the Bissell Bridge charged a toll until 1988 when the bridge was reconstructed. It has an interchange with U.S. Route 5 (US 5) in South Windsor at its junction with Route 30, and ends at I-84 in Manchester in a complex interchange that also provides access to I-384. At the west end, stub ramps continue about one-half mile (0.80 km) past I-91 to provide access to Route 218.

== History ==
The current I-291 is only the northeastern arc of what was originally planned as a three-quarter beltway around Hartford. From Windsor, I-291 would have continued to cross I-84 again in Farmington, and end at I-91 in Rocky Hill. While the remainder of I-291 was canceled amid environmental concerns, those two interchanges were built as part of I-84 and I-91 construction and stood unused for over 20 years as ramp stubs. Half of the stack interchange at I-84 was eventually placed in service when Route 9 was extended to run along a portion of the I-291 right of way south of I-84 in 1992. The I-91 ramp was demolished in 1999 during an expansion project. The northernmost two miles (3.2 km) of the Route 9 expressway follows the original path of the southwest segment of I-291 from I-84. Route 9 currently serves as the southwest quadrant around Hartford leaving only the northwest section of I-291 unbuilt.

Route 218 is a four-lane divided arterial route serving what would have been the northwest quadrant of the I-291 beltway. When the interchange with I-91 was completed in the early 1990s, a pair of ramp stubs connecting I-291 to Route 218 were built to the west of I-91 in anticipation that the northwest leg of I-291 might eventually be built. Over the years, there have been discussions of constructing a multilane surface road from the I-84/Route 9 stack interchange to Route 218 to complete the northwest bypass of Hartford, but funding and potential impacts to the reservoirs that supply Hartford with much of its drinking water have prevented anything from being built north of I-84. The CTDOT headquarters was built on land originally acquired for I-291 where it would have intersected US 5/Route 15 in Newington. A small portion of what was to be the northwest leg of I-291 was built along Route 218 west of I-91, which is now used as a commuter parking lot.

== Exit list ==
Exits were converted from sequential to mileage-based exit numbering on March 30, 2025.

The entire route is in Hartford County.

Location	mi	km	Old exit	New exit	Destinations	Notes
Windsor	0.00	0.00	1	1B	Route 218 – Bloomfield	Western terminus; at-grade intersection
Windsor	0.29	0.47	2	1A-C	I-91 – Hartford, Springfield	Westbound exit and eastbound entrance; signed as exits 1A (I-91 south) & 1C (I-91 north); exit 35A on I-91
Windsor	0.88	1.42	3	1D	Route 159 / Route 218 west – Windsor	Westbound exit and eastbound entrance; Route 218 not signed
Connecticut River	1.24	2.00	Bissell Bridge			
South Windsor	2.57	4.14	4	2	US 5 / Route 30 east – South Windsor, East Hartford	Route 30 not signed
Manchester	5.06	8.14	5	5A	Tolland Turnpike	Eastbound exit and westbound entrance
Manchester	5.66	9.11	–	5B	I-84 east – Boston	Eastbound exit and westbound entrance; exit 69 on I-84; former I-86
Manchester	6.02	9.69	–	5C	I-84 west (US 6 west) to I-384 east – Hartford	Eastern terminus
1.000 mi = 1.609 km; 1.000 km = 0.621 mi: Incomplete access
