= Connecticut Route 315 =

State highway in Hartford County, Connecticut, US

Route 315
- Map of Hartford County in northern Connecticut with Route 315 highlighted in red

Route information
- Maintained by CTDOT
- Length: 1.95 mi (3.14 km)
- Existed: 1963–present

Major junctions
- West end: US 202 / Route 10 in Simsbury
- East end: Route 189 in Simsbury

Location
- Country: United States
- State: Connecticut
- Counties: Hartford

Highway system
- Connecticut State Highway System; Interstate; US; State; SSR; SR; Scenic
← Route 314	→ Route 316

Route 315 is a state highway in northern Connecticut running entirely within Simsbury.

== Route description ==
Route 315 begins at an intersection with US 202 and Route 10 in Simsbury. It heads southeast across the Farmington River, then turns north along the river and east to the Tariffville section of Simsbury, where it ends at an intersection with Route 189.

== History ==
Route 315 was commissioned from former SR 915 in 1963. The only major changes since are the replacement of two bridges in 1992 and 1998.

== Junction list ==
The entire route is in Simsbury, Hartford County.

mi	km	Destinations	Notes
0.00	0.00	US 202 / Route 10 – Avon, Granby	Western terminus
1.95	3.14	Route 189 – Bloomfield, Granby	Eastern terminus
1.000 mi = 1.609 km; 1.000 km = 0.621 mi
