= Glen Filley =

American football and basketball coach

Biographical details
- Born: December 20, 1899; Cameron, Missouri, U.S.

Playing career

Football
- 1918–1920: Missouri Wesleyan

Coaching career (HC unless noted)

Football
- 1923–1924: Grand Island HS (NE)
- 1925–1929: McKendree

Basketball
- 1925–1929: McKendree

Administrative career (AD unless noted)
- 1925–1930: McKendree

Head coaching record
- Overall: 21–22–4 (college football); 42–44 (college basketball)

Glen Francis Filley (born December 20, 1899) was an American football and basketball coach. He served as the head football coach at McKendree College—now known as McKendree University—in Lebanon, Illinois from 1925 to 1929. Filley was also the head basketball coach at McKendree from 1925 to 1930, tallying a mark of 42–44.

== Head coaching record ==
=== College football ===
Year	Team	Overall	Conference	Standing	Bowl/playoffs
McKendree Bearcats (Illinois Intercollegiate Athletic Conference) (1925–1929)
1925	McKendree	5–3–1	5–1	4th	
1926	McKendree	1–6–1	1–3–1	T–16th	
1927	McKendree	6–2–2	3–2–1	T–9th	
1928	McKendree	5–5	2–1	7th	
1929	McKendree	4–6	1–4	T–18th	
McKendree:		21–22–4	12–11–2		
Total:		21–22–4			
