= William Filley =

Co-founder of Windsor, Connecticut

Personal details
- Born: c. 1617 England
- Died: Windsor, Connecticut, United States

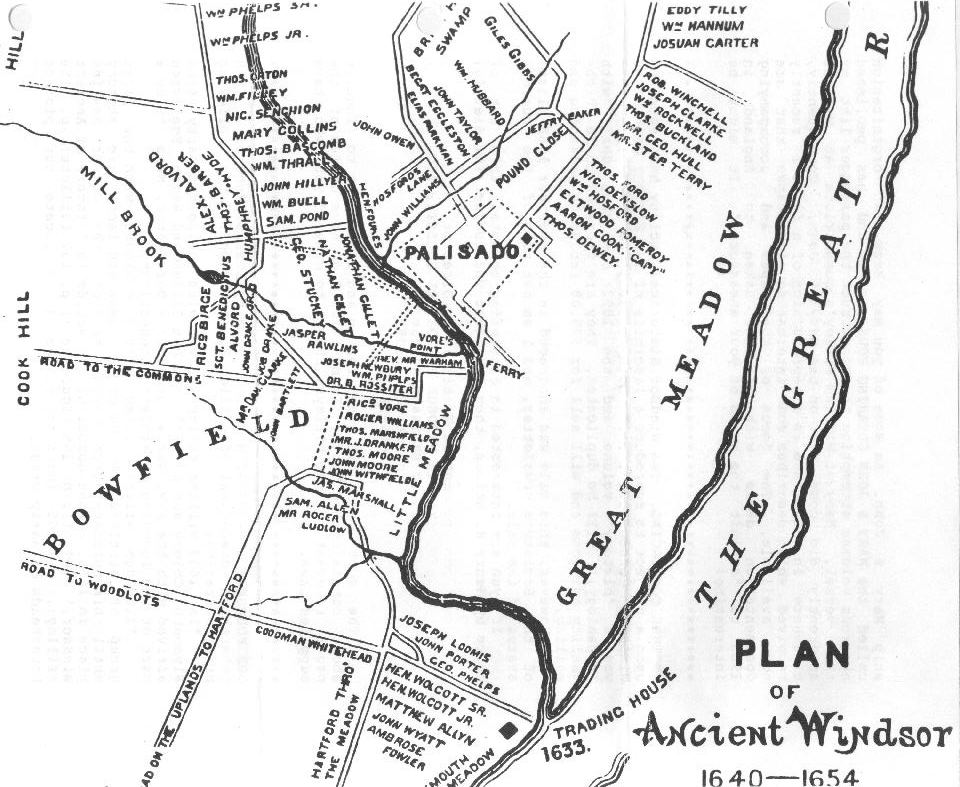
Early map of Windsor, Connecticut; William Filley's home is in the upper left corner.

William Filley was one of the founders of Windsor, Connecticut, USA. He helped establish a trading post on the Connecticut River near present-day Hartford despite Dutch threats. The local tribe of Algonquian-speaking Native Americans resented the location of the town site, as they considered the ground it stood on to be sacred. However, the tribe remained somewhat friendly for a time as the settlement served as a buffer against the more war-like Pequots and Mohawks.

Filley fought in the Pequot War. All of the children Filley had with his wife Margaret survived to adulthood, an unusual circumstance in the 17th century.
