= Windsor, Connecticut =

Town in Connecticut, United States

- Town
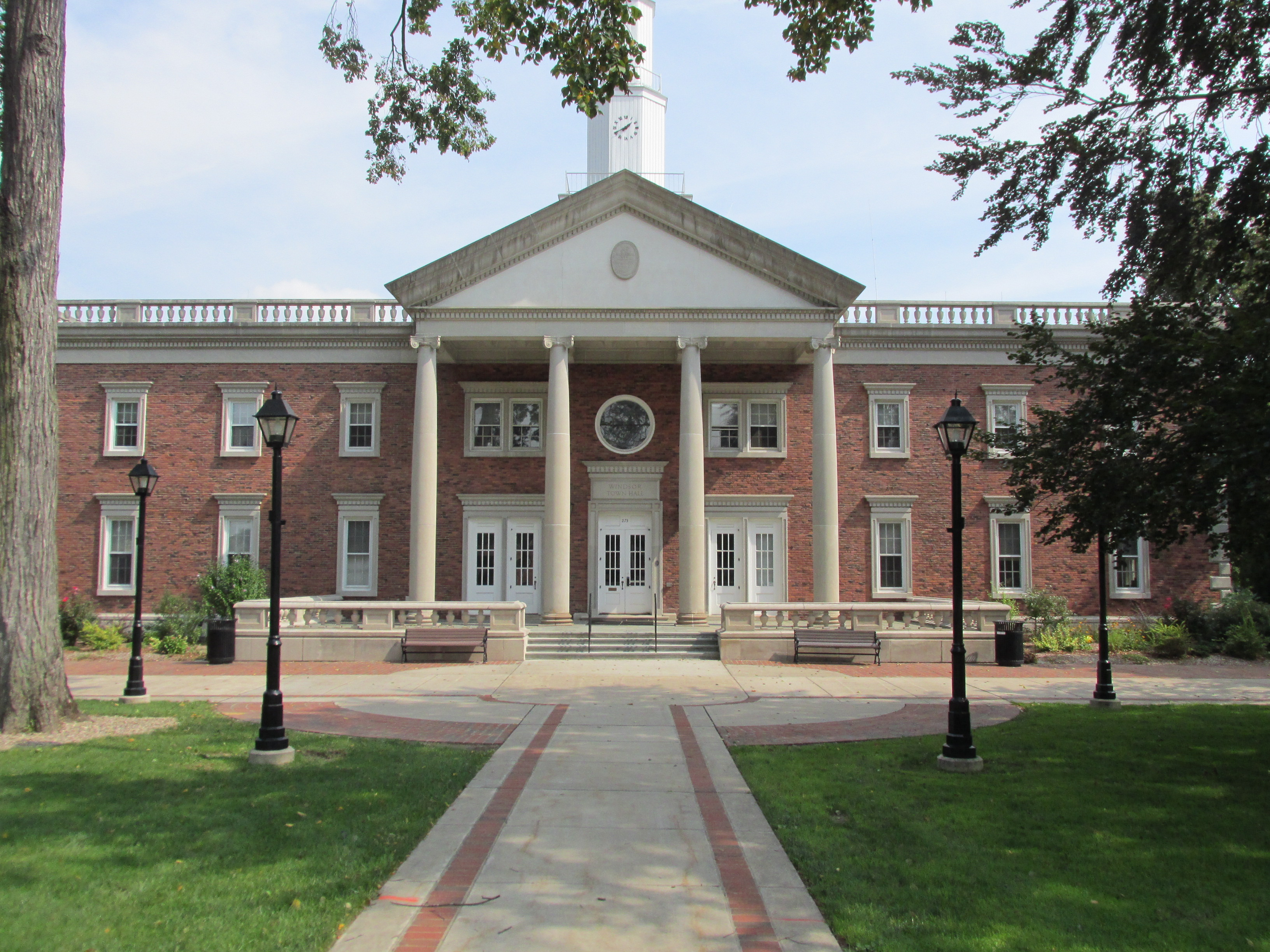
- Windsor Town Hall

- Flag Seal Emblem
- Motto: First in Connecticut, First for its Citizens
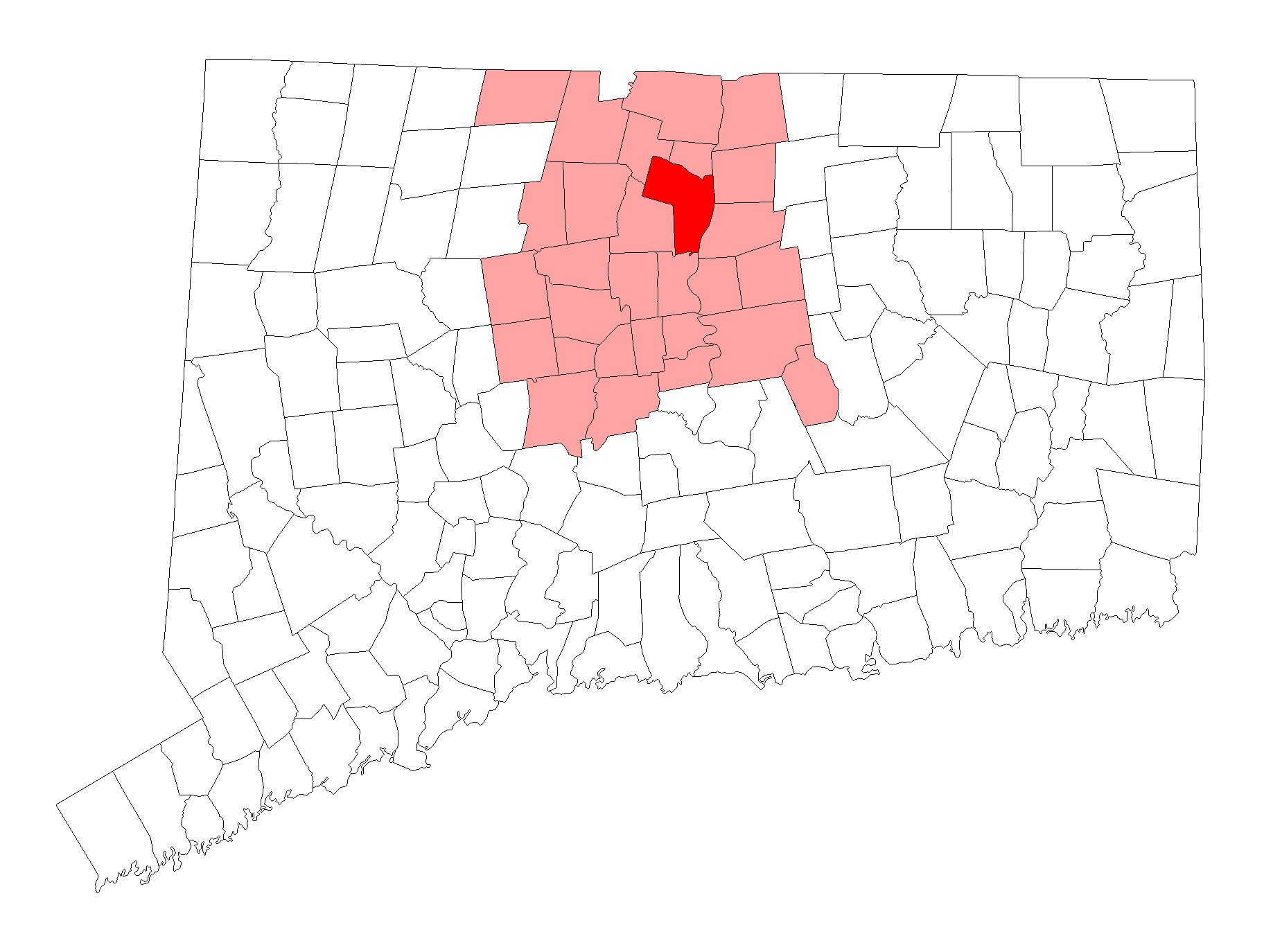
- Coordinates: 41°51′10″N 72°38′35″W
- Country: United States
- U.S. state: Connecticut
- County: Hartford
- Region: Capitol Region
- Settled: September 26, 1633
- Incorporated: February 21, 1637
- Named for: Windsor, Berkshire

Government
  - Type: Council-manager
  - Town manager: Peter Souza
  - Town council: Members: Mary L. Armstrong; Nuchette Black-Burke (mayor); Ronald Eleveld; Kristin Gluck-Hoffman; Anthony King; Darleen Klase (deputy mayor); Ojala Naeem; William Pelkey; Len Walker

Area
  - Total: 31.0 sq mi (80.2 km^{2})
  - Land: 29.5 sq mi (76.4 km^{2})
  - Water: 1.5 sq mi (3.8 km^{2})
- Elevation: 184 ft (56 m)

Population (2020)
  - Total: 29,492
  - Density: 1,000/sq mi (386/km^{2})
- Demonym: Windsor-head
- Time zone: UTC−5 (Eastern)
  - Summer (DST): UTC−4 (Eastern)
- ZIP Code: 06095
- Area codes: 860/959
- FIPS code: 09-87000
- GNIS feature ID: 212354
- Website: www.townofwindsorct.com

Windsor is a town in Hartford County, Connecticut. The town was the first English settlement in the state. It lies on the northern border of Connecticut's capital, Hartford. The town is part of the Capitol Planning Region. The population of Windsor was 29,492 at the 2020 census.

== History ==
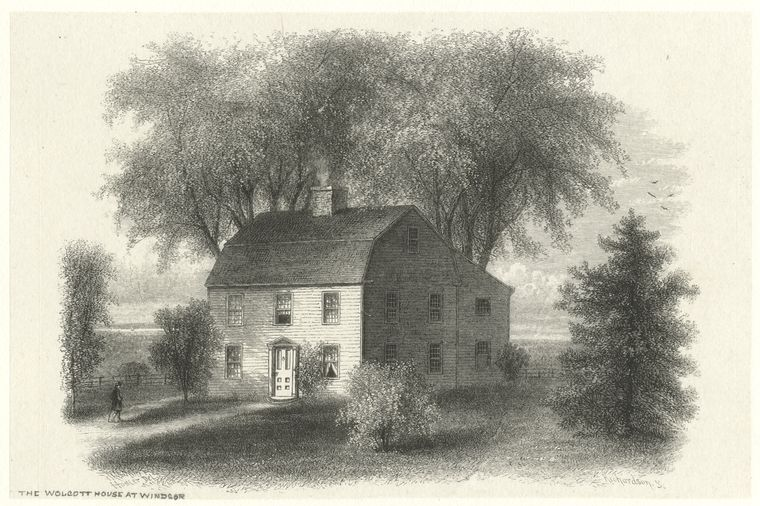
The Wolcott House, Windsor, early drawing

The coastal areas and riverways were traditional areas of settlement by various American Indian cultures, who had been in the region for thousands of years. They relied on the rivers for fishing, water and transportation. Before European contact, the historic Pequot and Mohegan tribes had been one Algonquian-speaking people. After they separated, they became competitors and traditional enemies in the Connecticut region.

During the first part of the 17th century, the Pequot and Mohegan nations had been at war. The Podunk were forced to pay tribute to the more powerful Pequot, who claimed their land. Eventually, the Podunk invited a small party of settlers from Plymouth, Massachusetts, to settle as a mediating force between the other tribes. In exchange they granted them a plot of land at the confluence of the Farmington River and the west side of the Connecticut River. After Edward Winslow came from Plymouth to inspect the land, William Holmes led a small party, arriving at the site on September 26, 1633, where they founded a trading post. The spot of the trading post is at the confluence of the Farmington and Connecticut Rivers. The Loomis Chaffee School currently owns the land as the spot is now the school's sports fields.

Native Americans referred to the area as Matianuck. It was about 50 miles (80 km) up river from Long Island Sound, at the end of waters navigable by ship and above the Dutch fort at Hartford, offering an advantageous location for the English to trade with the Indians before they reached the Dutch. (The Sicaog tribe had made a similar offer to mediate to the Dutch in New Amsterdam. New Netherland had far fewer European settlers than New England, and they were not in a position to take up the opportunity.)

In 1635, a party of around 30 people, sponsored by Sir Richard Saltonstall, and led by the Stiles brothers, Francis, John and Henry, settled in the Windsor area. Governor John Winthrop of the Massachusetts Bay Company acknowledged in a letter to Saltonstall that the Stiles party was the second group to settle Connecticut.

The first group of 60 or more people were led by Roger Ludlow, primary framer of the Fundamental Orders of Connecticut, having trekked overland from Dorchester, Massachusetts. They had arrived in the New World five years earlier on the ship Mary and John from Plymouth, England, and settled in Dorchester. Reverend Warham promptly renamed the Connecticut settlement "Dorchester". During the next few years, more settlers arrived from Dorchester, outnumbering and soon displacing the original Plymouth contingent, who returned to Plymouth in 1638 after selling their parcel to a Matthew Allyn of Hartford.

On February 21, 1637, the colony's General Court changed the name of the settlement from Dorchester to Windsor, named after the town of Windsor, Berkshire, on the River Thames in England. The same day, Windsor was incorporated as a town along with Hartford and Wethersfield.

Several "daughter towns" were formed from Windsor's original boundaries. These include portions or all of Barkhamsted, Bloomfield, Bolton, Colebrook, Coventry, East Granby, East Windsor, Ellington, Enfield, Granby, Harwinton, Litchfield, Manchester, Morris, Simsbury, South Windsor, Suffield, Tolland, Torrington, Vernon, and Windsor Locks.

The first "highway" in the Connecticut Colony opened in 1638 between Windsor and Hartford. Two years later, the highway was extended north to the colony's 1636 settlement at Springfield, with the road also connecting to Wethersfield and thus the four settlements that came to dominate the region for much of colonial history were connected.

In the summer of 1640, an event took place that would forever change the boundaries of the Connecticut River Valley. During a grain famine, the founder of Springfield, William Pynchon, was given authority by Windsor and Hartford to negotiate a price for grain for the three settlements with the natives. First, the natives refused to sell grain at the usual market price, and then refused to sell it at "a reasonable price". Pynchon refused to buy it, attempting to teach the natives a peaceful lesson about integrity and reliability. Windsor's cattle were starving, however, and the citizens of Hartford were furious. With Windsor's consent, Hartford commissioned the famous Indian fighter John Mason to travel to Springfield with "money in one hand and a sword in the other" to threaten the natives, and thereby force the grain trade. The natives capitulated and ultimately sold their grain. After "negotiating the trade", Mason refused to share the grain with Springfield, and, to add further insult, insisted that Springfield pay a tax when sailing ships passed Windsor. Outraged, Springfield forever sided with the Massachusetts Bay Colony, a Puritan settlement in Boston, rather than with the Connecticut Colony, which was much closer geographically and far more compatible ideologically. Windsor played a neutral role in the colonial rivalry between Hartford and Springfield; however, Windsor's direct border with both settlements caused many discussions about whether to align with Massachusetts or Connecticut. Ultimately, Windsor sided with Connecticut.

The Hartford & Springfield Street Railway, a trolley, connected with the Connecticut Company in Windsor Center until 1925. Buses replaced trolleys between Rainbow (a northern section of Windsor) and Windsor Center in 1930. Trolley cars continued to run from Windsor to Hartford until 1940.

When the Springfield Line of the NY, New Haven & Hartford RR was built, station stops included Windsor station in Windsor Center with stations also at Wilson in the south of town and Hayden in the north, named for owners who provided land for the railroad right of way. The line was double tracked until the late 1990s and redouble tracked in 2018. Sidings at Windsor station allowed cars to be spotted at the freight house and on the Loomis trestle just to its south. The trestle was removed in the late 1980s. An 1856 brownstone arch bridge carries the tracks over Pleasant St and the Farmington River. Incorporating a horizontal curve, its engineering was noteworthy when built. Following a fatal grade crossing accident, a three-track-wide plate girder bridge was installed to carry tracks over Palisado Avenue.

=== Tobacco farming ===
Tobacco farming in Connecticut has a long history. When the first settlers came to the valley in the 1630s, tobacco was already being grown by the native population. By 1700 it was being exported via the Connecticut River to European ports. The use of Connecticut tobacco as a cigar wrapper leaf began in the 1820s.

Area farmers grew tobacco for the two outside layers of cigars, the binder and the wrapper. Approximately 34,000 acres (14,000 ha) of land in Connecticut is covered by Windsor Soil, named after the town.

== Geography ==
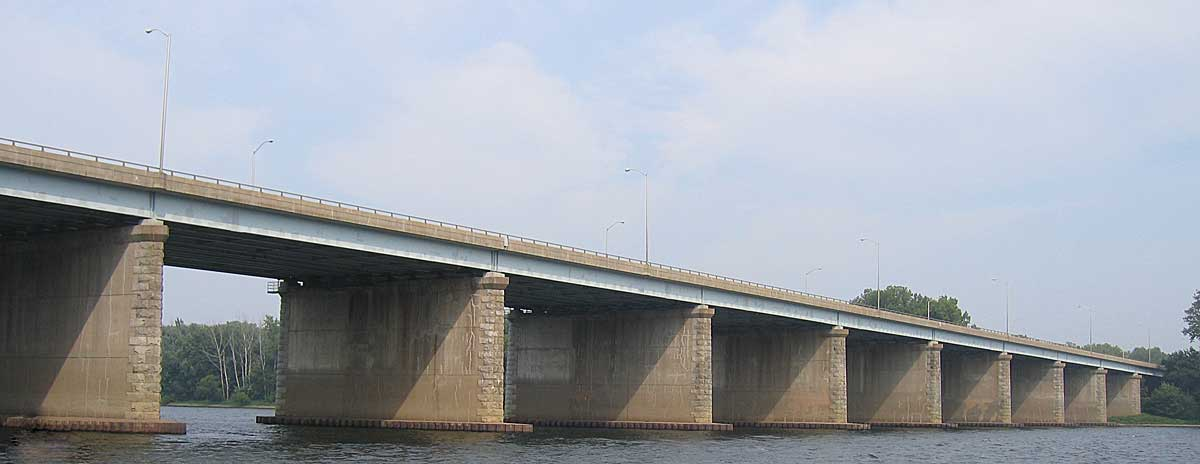
Captain John Bissell Memorial Bridge spanning the Connecticut River between the towns of Windsor and South Windsor

Windsor's highest point is on Day Hill at 230 feet (70 m) above sea level. Windsor's lowest point is on the Connecticut River, at 5 feet (1.5 m) above sea level. The Connecticut River defines Windsor's eastern border. The city of Hartford, the capital of Connecticut, is adjacent to Windsor to the south. The town of Windsor Locks, home of Bradley International Airport, is adjacent to Windsor to the north. Prior to its incorporation in 1854, it was known as the Pine Meadow section of Windsor. The towns of East Windsor and South Windsor are on the east side of the Connecticut River. The town of Bloomfield is to the west. The town of East Granby is to the northwest.

The Farmington River joins the Connecticut River in Windsor. The Farmington River is dammed in the northwestern corner of Windsor to form the 234-acre (0.95 km^{2}) Rainbow Reservoir.

=== Principal communities ===
- Deerfield
- Hayden Station
- Poquonock
- Rainbow
- Wilson
- Windsor Center

== Demographics ==
Historical population
Census	Pop.	Note	%±
1820	3,008		—
1850	3,294		—
1860	2,278		−30.8%
1870	2,783		22.2%
1880	3,058		9.9%
1890	2,954		−3.4%
1900	3,614		22.3%
1910	4,178		15.6%
1920	5,620		34.5%
1930	8,290		47.5%
1940	10,068		21.4%
1950	11,833		17.5%
1960	19,467		64.5%
1970	22,502		15.6%
1980	25,204		12.0%
1990	27,817		10.4%
2000	28,237		1.5%
2010	29,044		2.9%
2020	29,492		1.5%
U.S. Decennial Census

=== Population ===
As of the census of 2010, there were 29,044 people, 11,233 households, and 7,881 families residing in the town. The population density was 984.5 persons per square mile (380.2/km^{2}). There were 11,767 housing units at an average density of 398.9 per square mile (154.0/km^{2}). The racial makeup of the town was 54.7% White, 34.3% African American, 0.2% Native American, 4.5% Asian, 0.01% Pacific Islander, 3.1% some other race, and 3.2% from two or more races. Hispanic or Latino of any race were 8.4% of the population.

There were 11,233 households, out of which 28.1% had children under the age of 18 living with them, 50.9% were headed by married couples living together, 14.9% had a female householder with no husband present, and 29.8% were non-families. Of all households, 24.1% were made up of individuals, and 8.8% were someone living alone who was 65 years of age or older. The average household size was 2.54 and the average family size was 3.04.

In the town, the population was spread out, with 21.5% under the age of 18, 7.4% from 18 to 24, 23.9% from 25 to 44, 31.8% from 45 to 64, and 15.3% who were 65 years of age or older. The median age was 43.1 years. For every 100 females, there were 90.9 males. For every 100 females age 18 and over, there were 87.8 males.

=== Income ===
According to the U.S. Census Bureau's American Community Survey, for the period 2009–2011, median income for a household in the town was $78,211, and median income for a family was $89,726. Male full-time year-round workers had a median income of $58,668 versus $50,529 for females. The per capita income for the town was $34,899. About 3.1% of families and 4.5% of the population were below the poverty line, including 6.0% of those under age 18 and 4.8% of those age 65 or over.

Windsor was one of a handful of towns in the country where, in the 2000 United States census, median income for black households ($64,159) was larger than white households ($63,624). Asian households had a median income of $75,716. Hispanic or Latino (of any race) households have a median income of $69,808.

== Economy ==
=== Top employers ===
Top employers in Windsor according to the town's 2025 Comprehensive Annual Financial Report

#	Employer	# of Employees
1	Amazon.com	7,223
2	Town of Windsor	1,181
3	Voya Financial	723
4	Walgreens	650
5	SS & C Technologies Inc	500
6	Target Distribution Center	460
7	Dollar Tree	426
8	Eversource Energy	400
9	Waste Management	375
10	TLD GSE	350

== Arts and culture ==
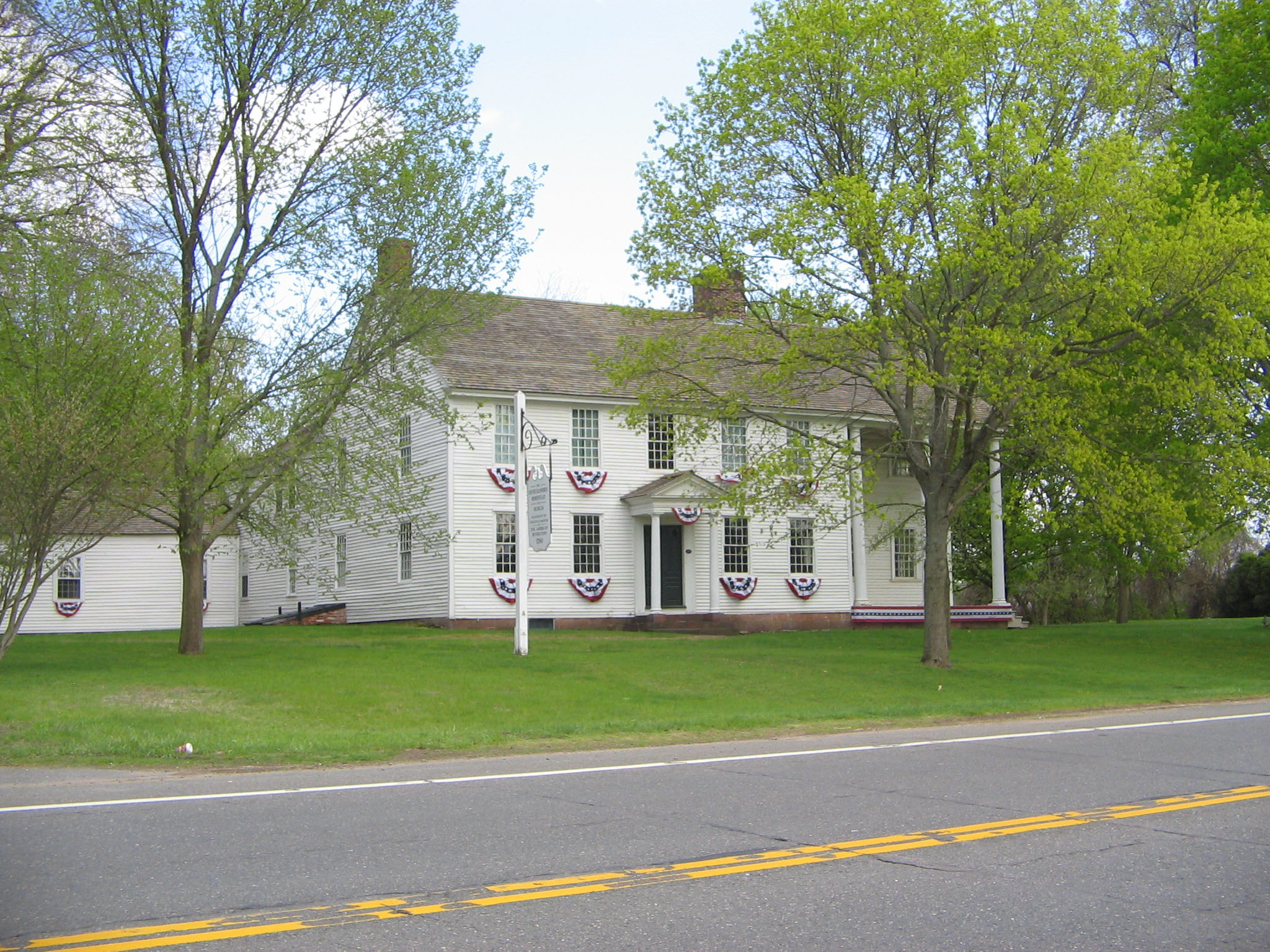
Oliver Ellsworth Homestead

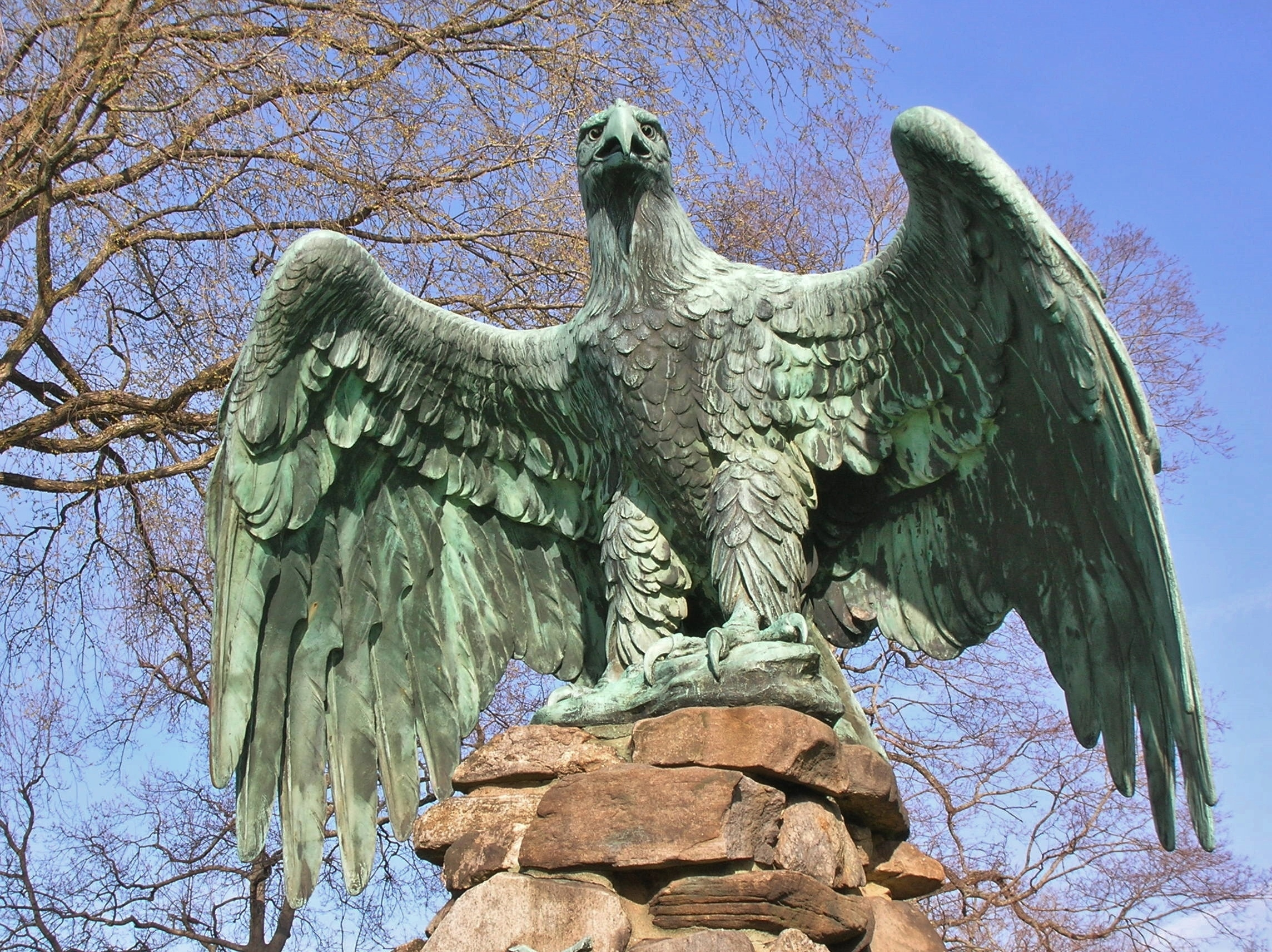
Windsor War Memorial, sculpted by Evelyn Beatrice Longman (1928)

Points of interest include:

- A three-story brick house where sixty men died between 1907 and 1917 while in the care of Amy Archer-Gilligan. Most were proven to be victims of arsenic poisoning. The stage play Arsenic and Old Lace and movie Arsenic and Old Lace was inspired events there.
- A statue of John Mason, a founder of Windsor and colonial leader in the Pequot War.
- The home of Oliver Ellsworth, third Chief Justice of the United States.
- A restored Amtrak train station dating to the 1850s.
- The Vintage Radio and Communications Museum of Connecticut.

From 1957 to 2006, the town was the location of the S1C Nuclear Powered Training Unit; a prototype nuclear power plant for the Naval Nuclear Propulsion Program. The former site has the distinction of being the first nuclear reactor site to receive unrestricted release after demolition and decontamination efforts.

There is one public library, Windsor Public Library, with two branches.

=== Events ===
The Northwest Park Country Fair is held every fall.

The Shad Derby Festival is held every spring in the town center.

The Carol sing and torchlight parade mark the holiday season in December.

== Parks and recreation ==
Parks include:

- Windsor Meadows State Park, located along the Connecticut River.
- Keney Park, which features cricket fields and a golf course.
- Northwest Park, Windsor's largest park, at 473 acres, includes a nature center, trails and a barn with animals.
- Mill Brook Open Space, a 95 acre property, used for recreation, a wildlife habitat, water quality improvement, and storm water protection.

== Government ==
Windsor has a council–manager government. The legislative function is performed by a bipartisan council of nine members, who are elected biennially for two-year terms. The town council elects a mayor from its membership for the two-year term, and also appoints the town manager. Peter Souza has served as Windsor's town manager since 2004.

=== State ===
General Assembly Representatives
Representative	Chamber	District	Party
Jane Garibay	House of Representatives	60th	Dem
Bobby Gibson	House of Representatives	15th	Dem
Maryam Khan	House of Representatives	5th	Dem
Tami Zawistowski	House of Representatives	61st	Rep

Connecticut Senate
Representative	Chamber	District	Party
Douglas McCrory	Senate	2nd	Dem
John Kissel	Senate	7th	Rep

United States House of Representatives
Representative	Chamber	District	Party
John B. Larson	Congress	1st	Dem

Voter registration and party enrolment as of October 31, 2024
Party	Active voters	Inactive voters	Total voters
Democratic	10,983	587	11,570
Republican	2,845	194	3,039
Unaffiliated	8,601	591	9,192
Minor parties	259	27	286
Total	22,688	1,399	24,087

The following minor parties have registered voters in Windsor: the Green Party, Libertarian Party, Working Families Party, and Independent Party.

== Education ==
Public schools in Windsor are a part of the Windsor Public Schools. Schools include:

- Clover Street School
- John F. Kennedy School
- Oliver Ellsworth School
- Poquonock School
- Sage Park Middle School
- Windsor High School

Magnet schools administered by the Capitol Region Education Council include the Academy of Aerospace and Engineering Middle School, and the Academy of Aerospace and Engineering High School.

Private schools include:

- Loomis Chaffee School.
- Madina Academy, Connecticut's first full-time Islamic School, offers preschool through 12th grade
- Saint Gabriel's School is a private school that teaches kindergarten through eighth grade.

== Media ==
The movie Parrish (1961) was set and filmed in the tobacco farms of Windsor.

== Infrastructure ==
=== Transportation ===
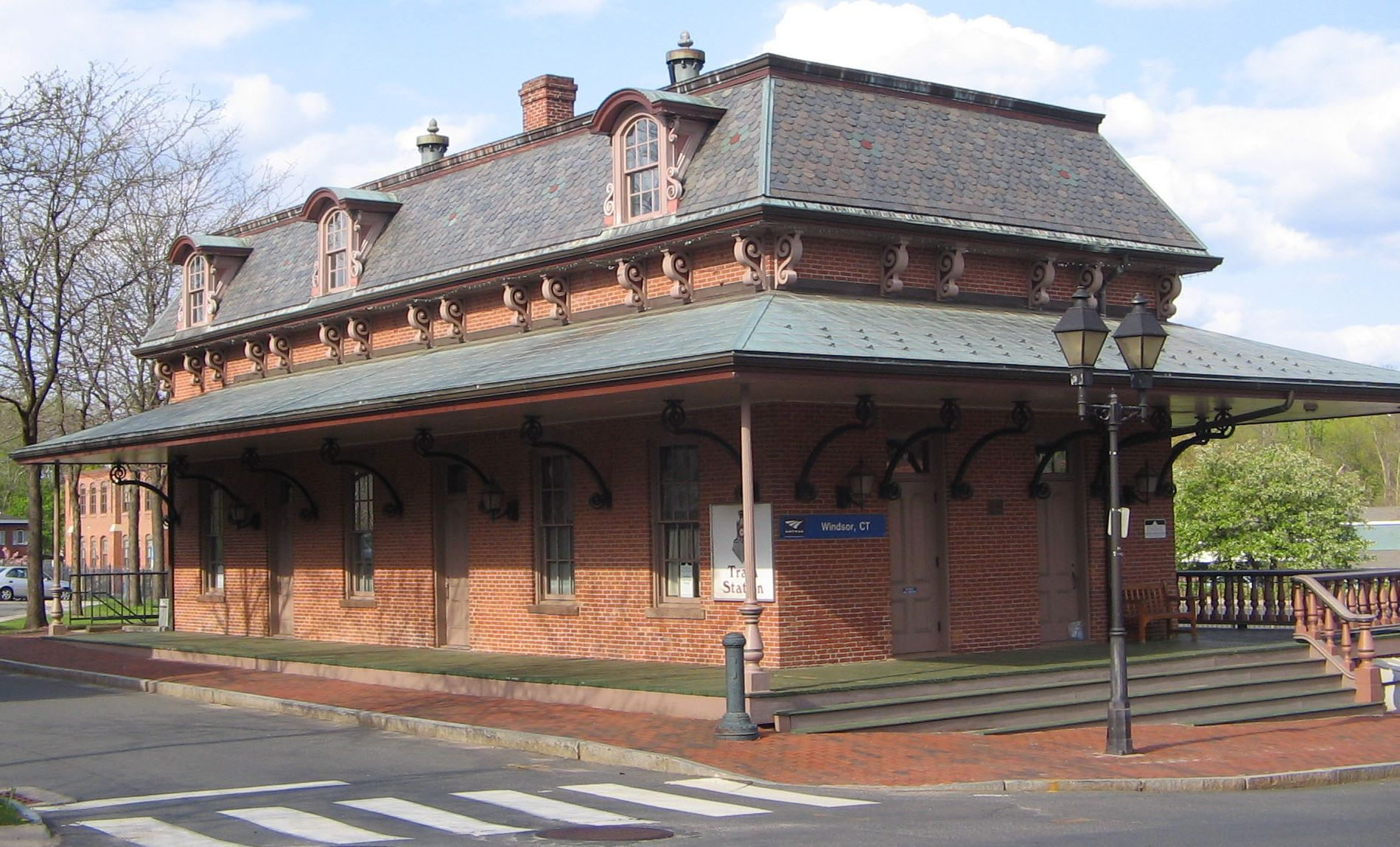
Windsor train station in the former Hartford & New Haven Railroad Depot. The station is served by the Hartford Line and Amtrak.

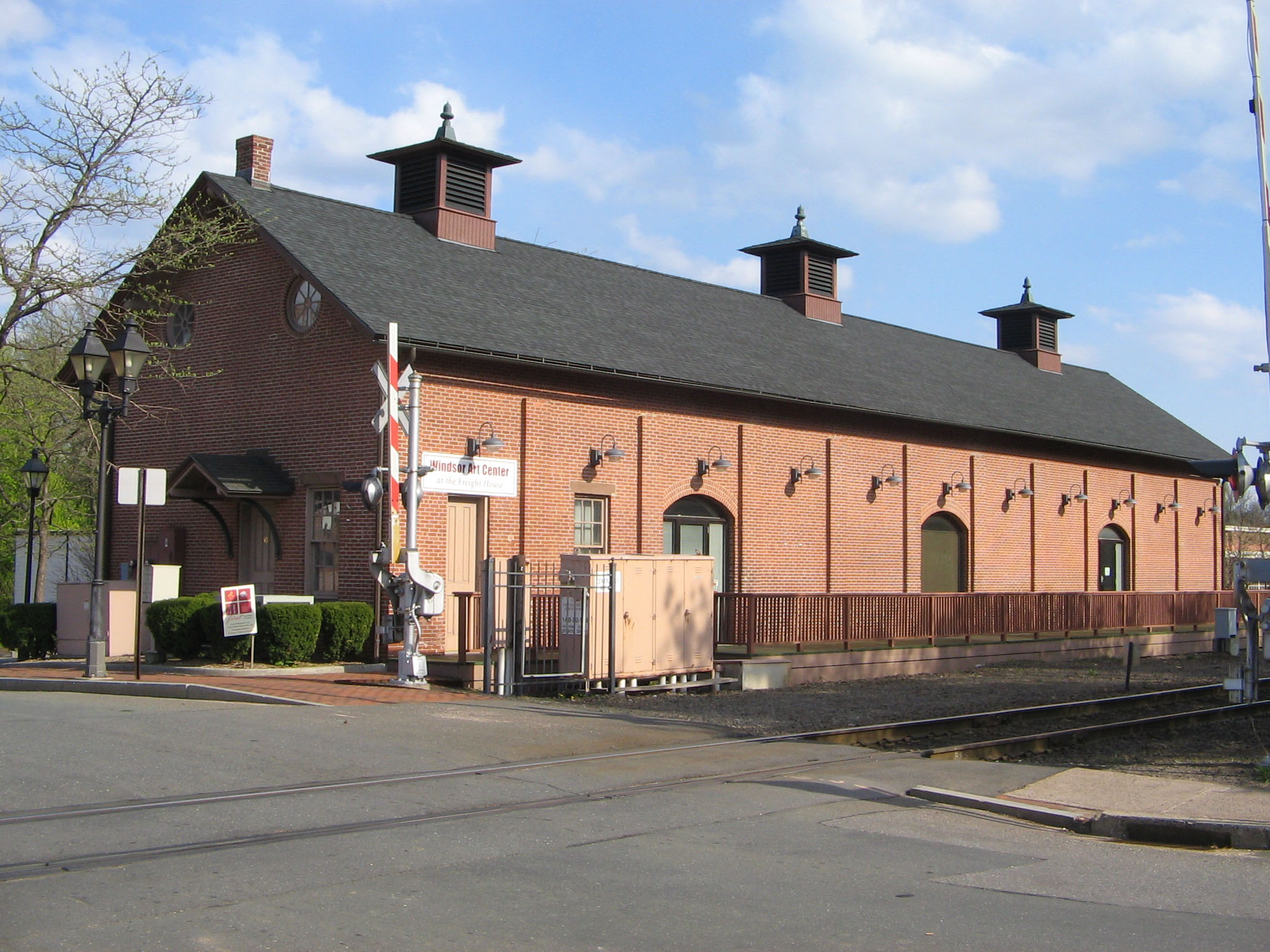
Windsor Art Center, in the former Hartford and New Haven Freight Depot

Bradley International Airport, which serves Greater Hartford and the greater Pioneer Valley, borders Windsor.

Connecticut Transit provides bus service.

Highways include:

- Interstate 91
- Interstate 291
- Connecticut Route 20
- Connecticut Route 75
- Route 159 (Connecticut–Massachusetts)
- Connecticut Route 178
- Route 187 (Connecticut–Massachusetts)
- Connecticut Route 218
- Connecticut Route 305

The railroad station in Windsor is served by Amtrak's Hartford Line, Northeast Regional and Valley Eagle trains, and trains on the CTrail Hartford Line.

=== Emergency services ===
Emergency services are administered by Windsor Police Department, Windsor Volunteer Fire Department, and Windsor Volunteer Ambulance.

== Notable people ==
- Al Anderson, guitarist, singer and songwriter, best known for his 20-year stint in NRBQ
- Christopher Isaiah Baker (born 1987), nicknamed "Swaggy", is an American football defensive tackle
- Moe Drabowsky (1935–2006), Polish-born Major League Baseball pitcher, raised in Wilson, schooled at Loomis
- Oliver Ellsworth, third Chief Justice of the United States, a drafter of the Constitution and American Founding Father, was born in Windsor
- Roger Enos, veteran of the French and Indian War and American Revolution who commanded the Vermont Militia in the later stages of the American Revolution
- John Fitch, inventor of the steamboat, held several patents, operator of the US's first steamboat line
- Edith Julia Griswold (1863–1926), lawyer and patent expert
- General William Hayden, Connecticut Adjutant General 1835–1836
- Mike Joy (born 1949), TV sports announcer, voice of FOX Sports' NASCAR TV coverage, served four elected terms on the Windsor Town Council
- Christine Ladd-Franklin (1847–1930), American psychologist and logician
- Evelyn Beatrice Longman, first woman sculptor to be elected a full member of the National Academy of Design
- Lancelot Phelps (1784–1866), congressman from Connecticut
- William Phelps (1593–1672), woodworker, judge, civil servant
- Joseph Hayne Rainey (1832–1887), first African American to be elected to Congress, US congressman from South Carolina, lived in a summer house here with his family
- Iceman John Scully, professional boxer, world title challenger, ESPN Classic boxing broadcaster
- John H. Swift (1840–1911), manufacturer member of the New York State Assembly, grew up in Poquonock
- Ethna Beulah Winston (1903–1993), educator, dean of women
- Erastus Wolcott (1722–1793), political and military leader during the American Revolutionary War
- Oliver Wolcott, American Founding Father, born in Windsor
- Roger Wolcott (1679–1767), weaver, colonial governor of Connecticut (1751–1754), father of Oliver Wolcott

== See also ==
- William Filley
- Hartford Electric Light Company
- National Register of Historic Places listings in Windsor, Connecticut
